= List of tallest buildings in Huế =

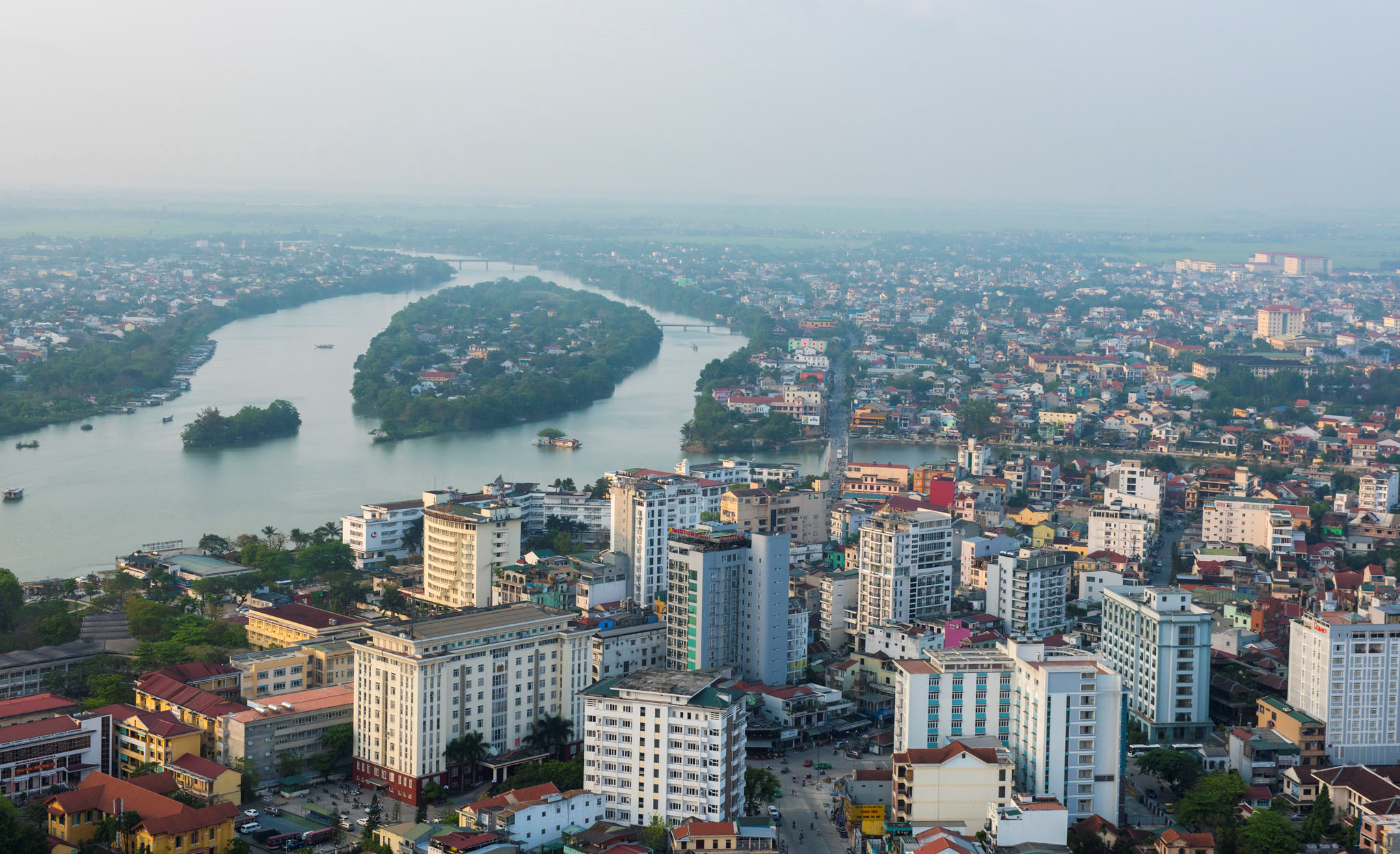
Huế City

This is a list of tallest buildings in Huế.

Total number of buildings in Huế
Area	≥50m	≥100m
Huế	11	1
Hương Thủy	2	0

== List of buildings ==
Below is a list of the tallest buildings in Huế that have been completed with height over 50m or over 15 floors.

The tallest building in Thừa Thiên Huế
The building was once the tallest in Thừa Thiên Huế
The building has been partially completed
The building has been roofed

Class	Building	Image	City, district	Wards	Height	Floor	Complete	Note
1	Meliá Vinpearl Huế		Thuận Hóa	Phú Nhuận	160	39	2018	The tallest building in Huế city and the whole Thua Thien Huế province. It is also the tallest building in the North Central region.
2	The Manor Crown A		Thuận Hóa	Xuân Phú	74,9	19	2020	The tallest twin towers in the Thừa Thiên Huế province
3	The Manor Crown B		Thuận Hóa	Xuân Phú	74,9	19	2020	The tallest twin towers in the Thừa Thiên Huế province
4	La Vela Hotel		Hương Thủy	Thủy Dương	74,1	18	2023	The tallest building in Hương Thủy town
5	Nera Garden		Thuận Hóa	An Đông	72,5	20	2021	
6	Indochine Palace Hotel		Thuận Hóa	Phú Nhuận	67,2	17	2009	Tòa nhà cao nhất tỉnh từ năm 2007 đến năm 2018
7	Imperial Hotel		Thuận Hóa	Phú Nhuận	60	16	2006	The tallest building in the province from 2006 to 2007
8	White Lotus Hotel		Thuận Hóa	Phú Nhuận	57	15	2020	
9	Huế International Specialized Hospital		Thuận Hóa	Phú Nhuận	55	16	2022	Forerunner was the Viwaseen building. In 2011, the building was abandoned after the rough construction had been completed. In 2017, the building was converted into a hospital but progress was still behind.
10	De 1st Quantum		Hương Thủy	Thủy Dương	54,8	14	2022	
11	Redemptorist Church		Thuận Hóa	Phú Nhuận	53	3	1962	The tallest building in the province from 1962 to 2006
12	Moonlight Hotel Huế		Thuận Hóa	Phú Hội	51	15	2013	
13	Khách sạn Đông Dương		Thuận Hóa	Phú Nhuận	51	15	2023	The roof has been topped off

== Building under construction ==
The list includes buildings that are under construction or have not yet been topped off.

Class	Building	Location	Height	Floor	Expected to be completed
1	Chung cư thương mại, dịch vụ B1-A	Huế	74,4	20	2024
2	West Sky Ecogarden XH01	Huế	55,1	15	2025
3	West Sky Ecogarden XH04	Huế	55,1	15	2025

Class	Building	Location	Height	Floor	Year	Status
1	Koreana Twin Tower A1	Huế	119	35	2024	Propose
2	Koreana Twin Tower A2	Huế	119	35	2024	Propose
3	Minh Linh Compound - Block 13	Hương Thủy	116	34	2024	Propose
4	Huế Tourist Market Hotel Tower	Hương Thủy	114	30	2026	Vision
5	Chung cư Đống Đa B	Huế	105	25	2026	Plan
6	Apec Mandala Wyndham A	Huế	95	25	-	Propose
7	Apec Mandala Wyndham B	Huế	95	25	-	Propose
8	An Cựu City - O-CC2	Huế	85	25	-	Approve
9	Chung cư Đống Đa A	Huế	80	19	2026	Propose
10	Chung cư Đống Đa C	Huế	80	19	2026	Propose
11	An Cựu City - O-CC1	Huế	68	20	-	Approve
12	An Cựu City - O-CC3	Huế	68	20	-	Approve
13	Novotel Huế	Huế	65	17	-	Propose
14	West Sky Ecogarden XH02	Huế	55,1	15	2025	Plan
15	West Sky Ecogarden XH03	Huế	55,1	15	2025	Plan
16	Eldora Hotel II	Huế	55	14	2025	Plan
17	Nguyễn Kim Plaza	Huế	50	11	-	Plan
18	Minh Linh Compound - Block 17	Hương Thủy	-	-	2024	Propose
19	Minh Linh Compound - Block 18	Hương Thủy	-	-	2024	Propose
20	Minh Linh Compound - Block 15	Hương Thủy	-	-	2026	Propose
21	Minh Linh Compound - Block 16	Hương Thủy	-	-	2026	Propose

== Delayed ==
Class	Building	Location	Height	Number of floors	Start	Delay	Progress
1	Khách sạn Petrolimex	Huế	76	20	-	-	Cancel
2	Goldland Plaza (phase 2)	Huế	74,2	18	2010	2023	Opening phase 1 (base block)
3	VNPT Huế Building	Huế	61	16	2018	2019	Construction to the 7th floor
4	Huế International Specialized Hospital	Huế	55	16	2009 / 2021	2011 / 2022	Glass installation

== Timeline of tallest building ==
No. 5 tallest	Building	Image	Height (m)	Ward
2018 - present	Meliá Vinpearl Huế		160	Phú Nhuận
2007 - 2018	Indochine Palace Hotel		67,2	Phú Nhuận
2006 - 2007	Imperial Hotel		60	Phú Hội
1962 - 2006	Redemptorist Church		53	Phú Nhuận
1948 - 1962	Flagstaff		37	Thuận Hòa
1844 - 1948	Thiên Mụ Temple		21	Hương Long
1807 - 1844	Flagstaff (1807)		17,5	Thuận Hòa
