= Huế (provincial city) =

Former provincial city in the former Thừa Thiên Huế province, Vietnam

Huế Thuận Hóa
- Provincial city
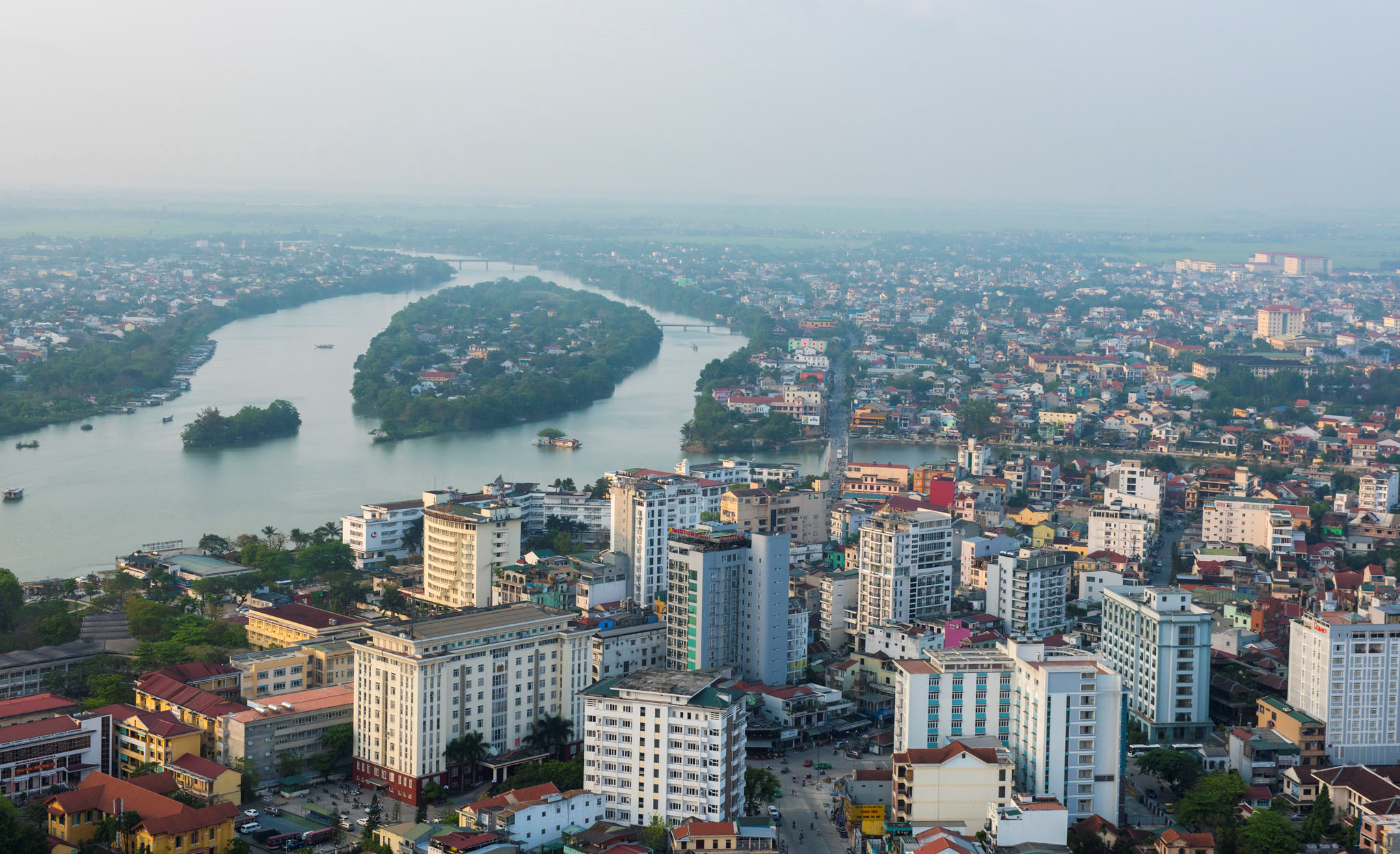
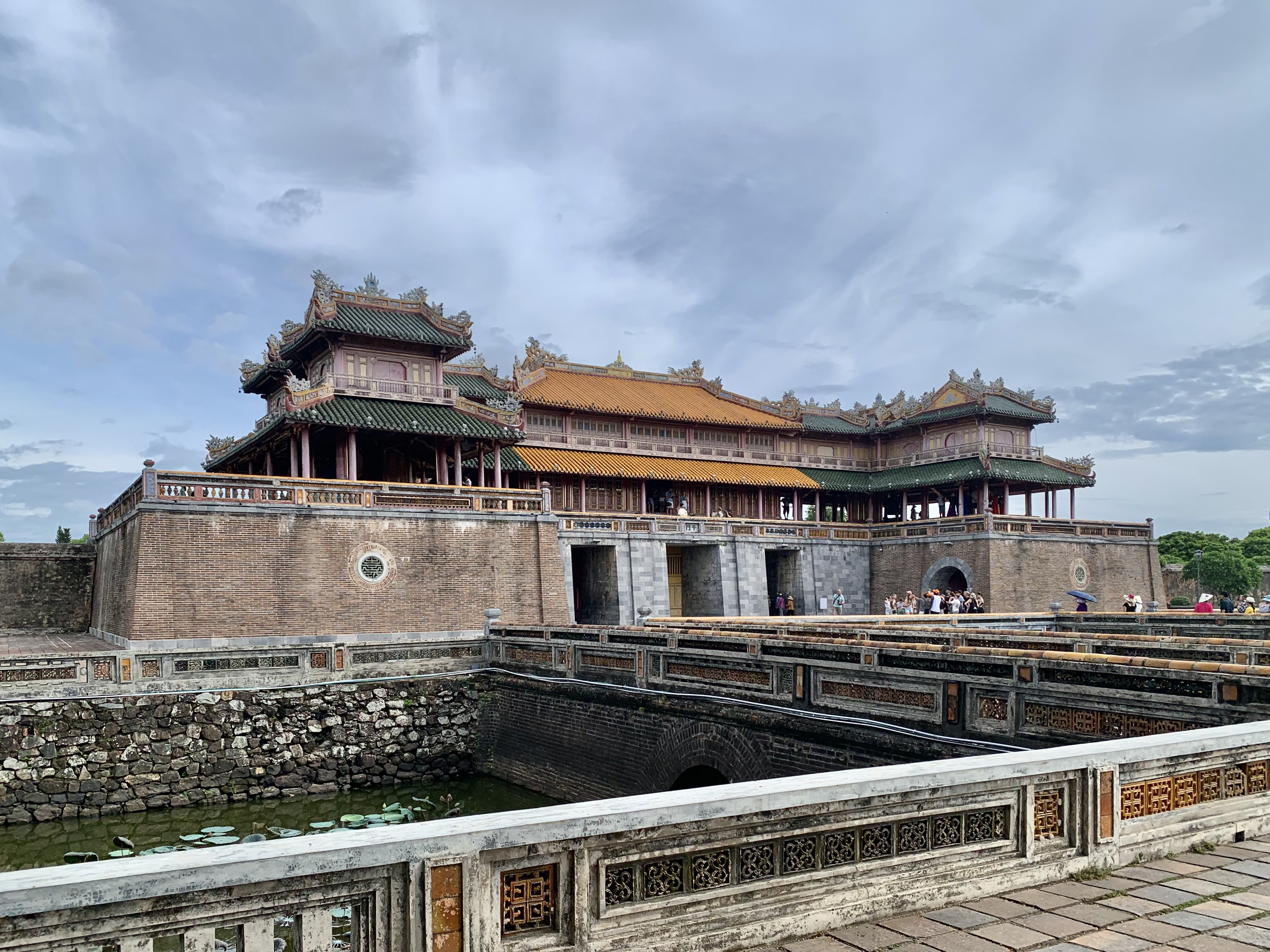
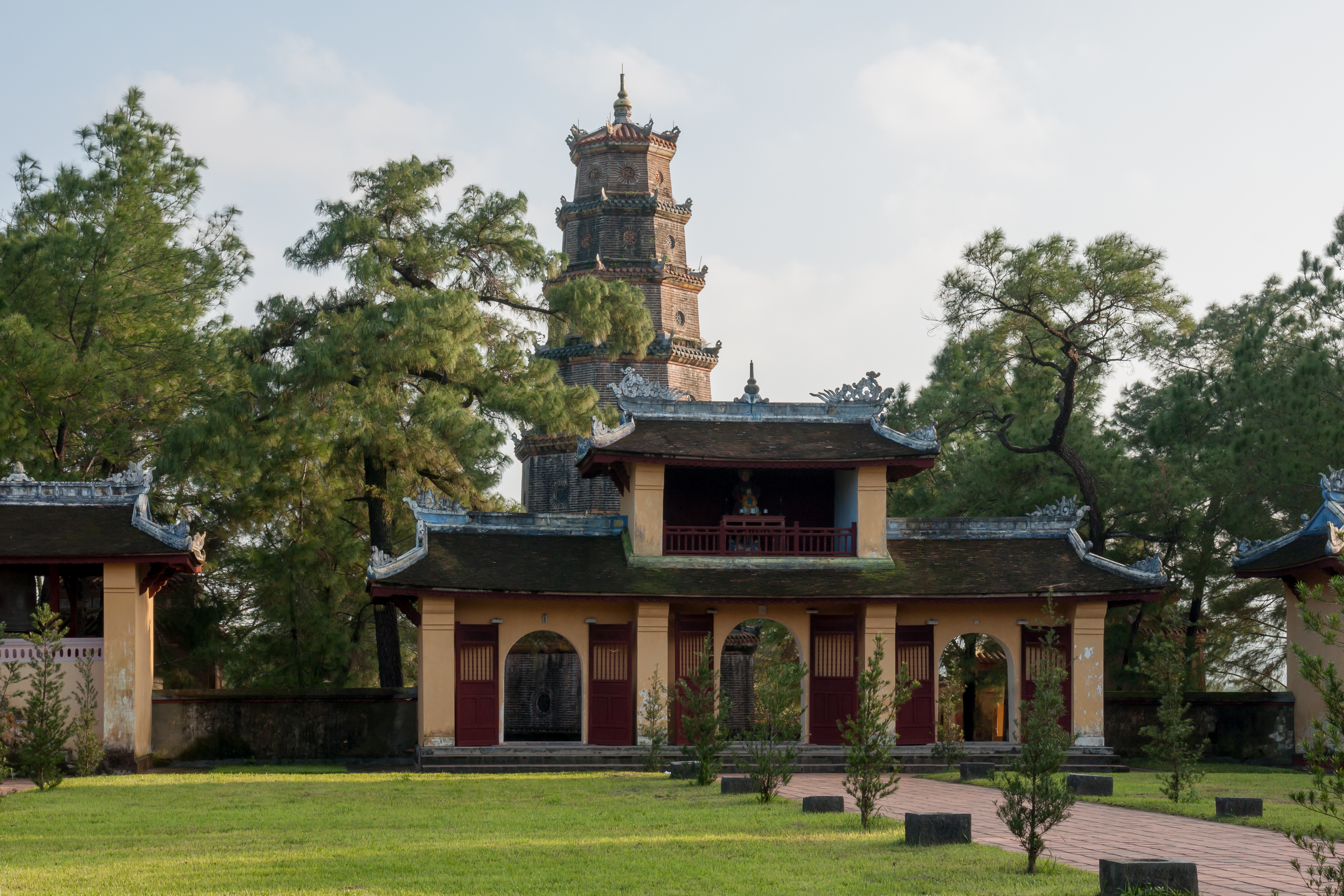
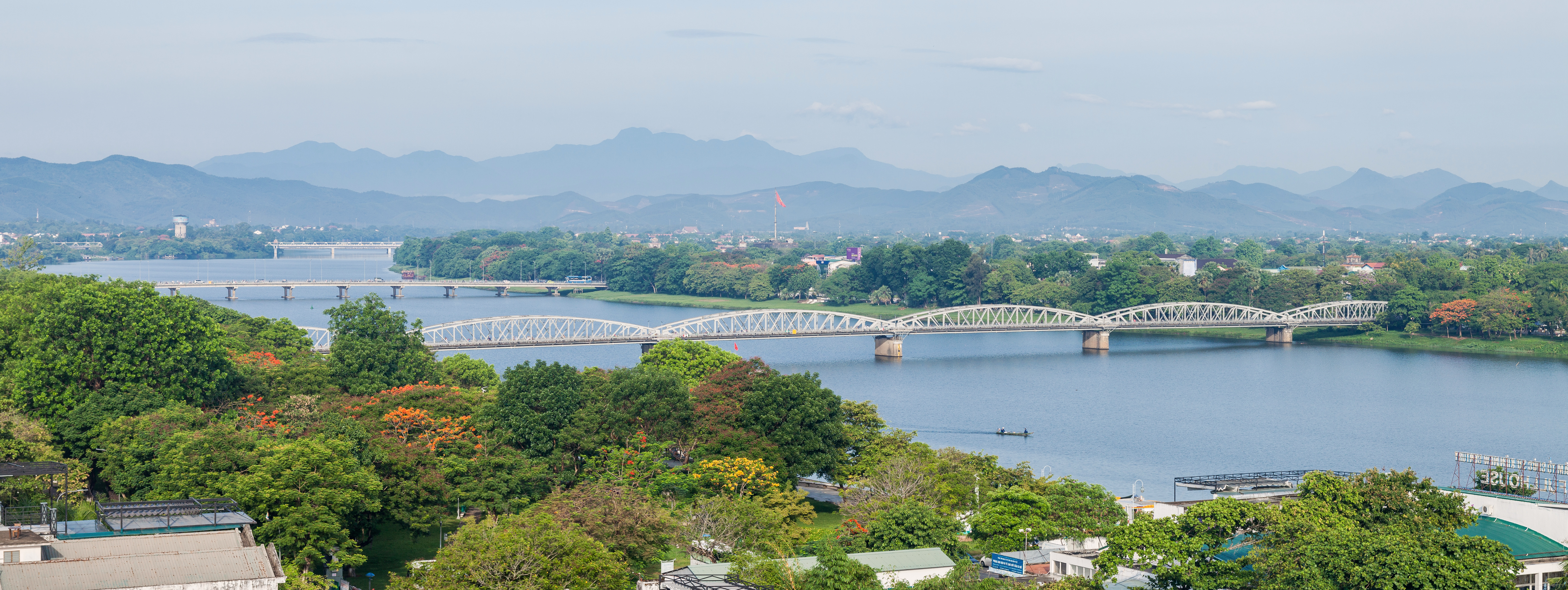
- Aerial view of Hue Meridian Gate Thiên Mụ Temple Trường Tiền Bridge
- Nicknames: City of Romance, Festival City
- Location of Huế Huế (Southeast Asia) Huế (Asia)
- Coordinates: 16°28′00″N 107°34′45″E 16°28′N 107°35′E
- Country: Vietnam
- Region: North Central Coast

Area
  - Total: 265.99 km^{2} (102.70 sq mi)
- Elevation: 15 m (49 ft)

Population (2020)
  - Total: 652,572
  - Density: 2,453/km^{2} (6,350/sq mi)

Metro GDP (PPP, constant 2015 values)
  - Year: 2023
  - Total: $3.8 billion
  - Per capita: $8,900
- Postal code: 53
- Climate: Am

Huế (Vietnamese: [hwě]) is a former provincial city of Vietnam. The city was the capital of Thừa Thiên Huế province in the North Central Coast region of Vietnam, located near the center of Vietnam. The original site was a Cham city known as Kandarpapura and later as Amarendrapura and was the capital of the Champa Kingdom from 192 to 605. On 1 January 2025, Thừa Thiên Huế province was upgraded to become Vietnam's sixth centrally-governed municipality, named Huế. The former provincial city was dissolved to establish two new urban districts: Phú Xuân district and Thuận Hóa district.

Following the conquest of the city in 1307 by Vietnam, it was renamed to Huế. Huế (Thuận Hóa) was the capital of Đàng Trong from 1738 to 1775 and of Vietnam during the Nguyễn dynasty from 1802 to 1945. The city served as the old Imperial City and administrative capital for the Nguyễn dynasty and later functioned as the administrative capital of the protectorate of Annam during the French Indochina period. It contains a UNESCO-designated site, the Complex of Huế Monuments, which is a popular tourist attraction. Alongside its moat and thick stone walls the complex encompasses the Imperial City of Huế, with palaces and shrines; the Forbidden Purple City, once the emperor's home; and a replica of the Royal Theater.

Nearly 4.2 million visitors had visited the city in 2019 and many of its historic landmarks are still undergoing restoration.

== History ==
The oldest ruins in Huế belong to the Kingdom of Lâm Ấp, dating back to the 4th century AD. The ruins of its capital, the ancient city of Kandarpapura (lit. 'the city where Śiva burnt Kama'), is now located in Long Tho Hill, three kilometers to the west of the city. Kandarpapura might have only been established during the reign of Kandarpadharma (r. 629–640) and it was named after the king, certainly it may be not the name of the capital of former Lâm Ấp kingdom. Another Champa ruin in the vicinity, the ancient city of Hoa Chau is dated back to the 9th century.

In 1306, the King of Champa, Chế Mân offered Vietnam two Cham prefectures, Ô and Lý, in exchange for marriage with a Vietnamese (Trần dynasty) princess named Huyền Trân. The Vietnamese King Trần Anh Tông accepted this offer. He took and renamed Ô and Lý prefectures to Thuan prefecture and Hóa prefecture, respectively, the two being often referred collectively to as Thuận Hóa region.

In 1592, the Mạc dynasty was forced to flee to Cao Bằng province and the Lê emperors were enthroned as de jure Vietnamese rulers under the leadership of Nguyễn Kim, the leader of Lê dynasty loyalists. Later, Kim was poisoned by a Mạc dynasty general which paved the way for his son-in-law, Trịnh Kiểm, to take over the leadership. Kim's eldest son, Nguyen Uông, was also assassinated in order to secure Trịnh Kiểm's authority. Nguyễn Hoàng, another son of Nguyễn Kim, feared a fate like Nguyễn Uông's so he pretended to have a mental illness. He asked his sister Ngoc Bao, who was a wife of Trịnh Kiểm, to entreat Trịnh Kiểm to let Nguyễn Hoàng govern Thuận Hóa, the furthest south region of Vietnam at that time.

Because Mạc dynasty loyalists were revolting in Thuận Hóa, and Trịnh Kiểm was busy fighting the Mạc dynasty's forces in northern Vietnam during this time, Ngoc Bao's request was approved, and Nguyễn Hoàng went south. After Hoàng pacified Thuận Hóa, he and his heir Nguyễn Phúc Nguyên secretly made this region loyal to the Nguyễn family; then they rose against the Trịnh lords. Vietnam erupted into a new civil war between two de facto ruling families: the clan of the Nguyễn lords and the clan of the Trịnh lords.

The Nguyễn lords chose Thừa Thiên, a northern territory of Thuận Hóa, as their family seat. In 1687 during the reign of Nguyễn lord Nguyễn Phúc Trăn, the construction of a citadel was started in Phú Xuân (later renamed as Huế) a village in Thừa Thiên province. The citadel was a powerful symbol of Nguyễn family rather than a defensive building because the Trịnh lords' army could not breach Nguyễn lords' defense in the northern regions of Phú Xuân. In 1744, Phú Xuân officially became the capital of central and southern Vietnam after Nguyễn lord Nguyễn Phúc Khoát proclaimed himself Vo Vương (Vo King or Martial King in Vietnamese). Among westerners living in the capital at this period was the Portuguese Jesuit João de Loureiro from 1752 onwards.

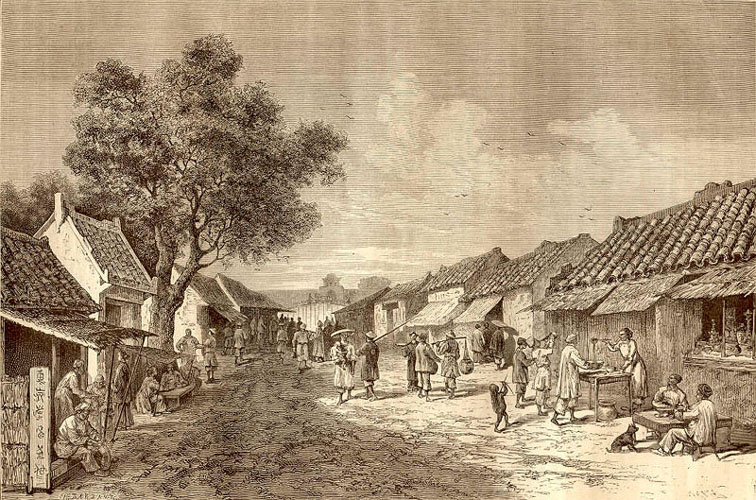
Hue City in 1875

However, Tây Sơn rebellions broke out in 1771 and quickly occupied a large area from Quy Nhon to Bình Thuận province, thereby weakening the authority and power of the Nguyễn lords. While the war between Tây Sơn rebellion and Nguyễn lord was being fought, the Trịnh lords sent south a massive army and easily captured Phú Xuân in 1775. After the capture of Phú Xuân, the Trịnh lords' general Hoàng Ngũ Phúc made a tactical alliance with Tây Sơn and withdrew almost all troops to Tonkin and left some troops in Phú Xuân. In 1786, Tây Sơn rebellion defeated the Trịnh garrison and occupied Phú Xuân. Under the reign of the emperor Quang Trung, Phú Xuân became the Tây Sơn dynasty capital. In 1802, Nguyen Ánh, a successor of the Nguyễn lords, recaptured Phú Xuân and unified the country. Nguyễn Ánh rebuilt the citadel entirely and made it the Imperial City capital of all of Vietnam.

In 1802, Nguyễn Phúc Ánh (later Emperor Gia Long) succeeded in establishing his control over the whole of Vietnam, thereby making Hue the national capital.

The second emperor of the Nguyễn dynasty to rule from Huế, reigning from his birthday on 14 February 1820 until his death, on 20 January 1841 was Minh Mạng. He was a younger son of Emperor Gia Long, whose eldest son, Crown Prince Cảnh, had died in 1801. Minh Mạng was well known for his opposition to French involvement in Vietnam, and for his rigid Confucian orthodoxy.

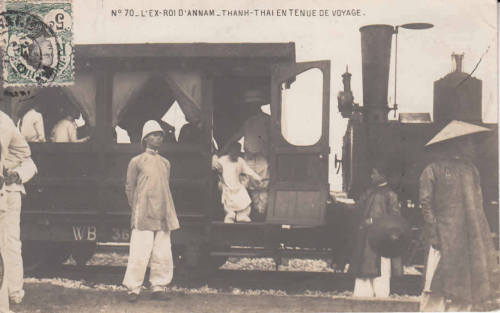
Emperor Thành Thái and family at Hue Station, 1905

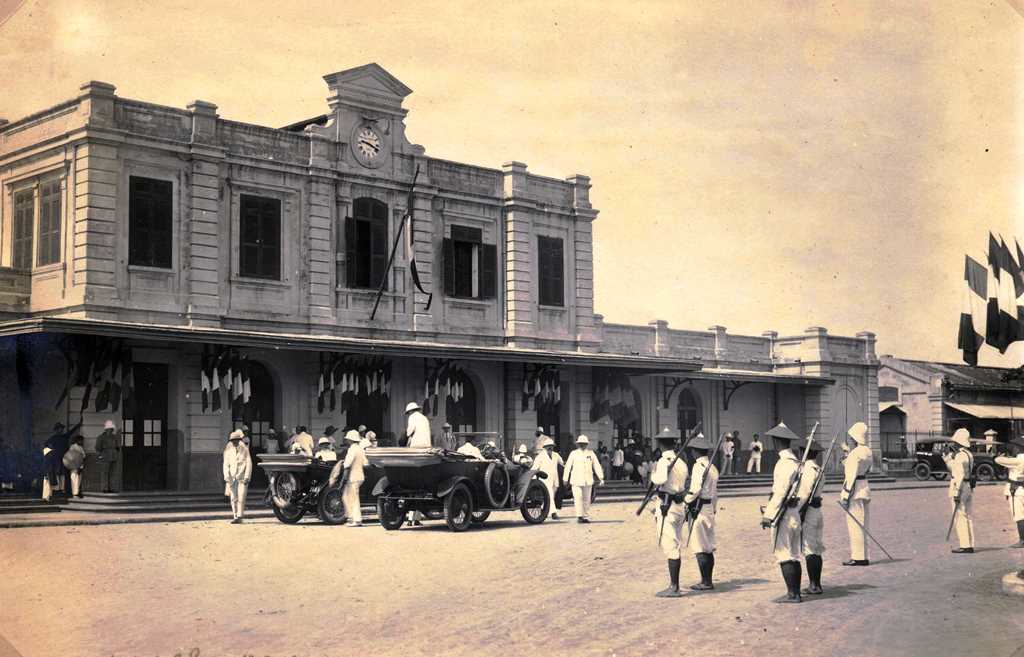
Hue Station, 1923

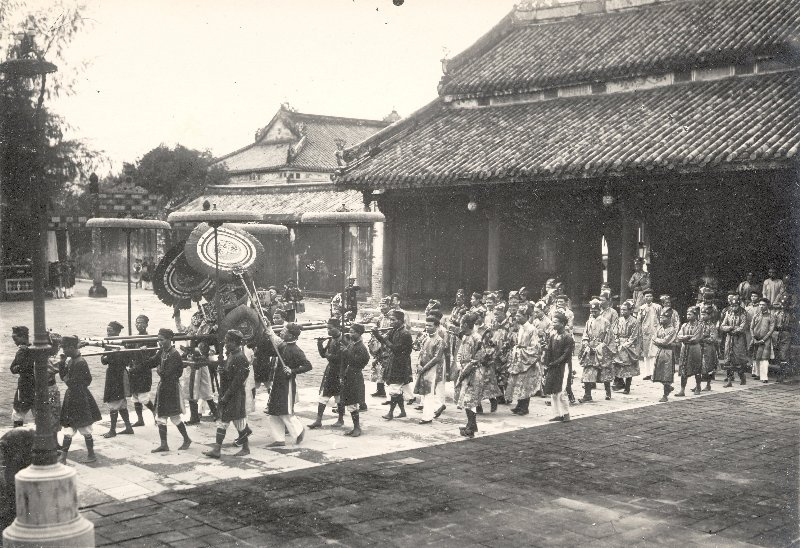
Enthronement of Emperor Bảo Đại in the Imperial City in 1926

During the French colonial period, Hue was in the protectorate of Annam. It remained the seat of the Imperial Palace until 1945, when Emperor Bảo Đại abdicated and the Democratic Republic of Vietnam (DRV) government was established with its capital at Ha Noi (Hanoi), in the north.

While Bảo Đại was proclaimed "Head of the State of Vietnam" with the help of the returning French colonialists in 1949 (although not with recognition from the communists or the full acceptance of the Vietnamese people), his new capital was Sai Gon (Saigon), in the south.

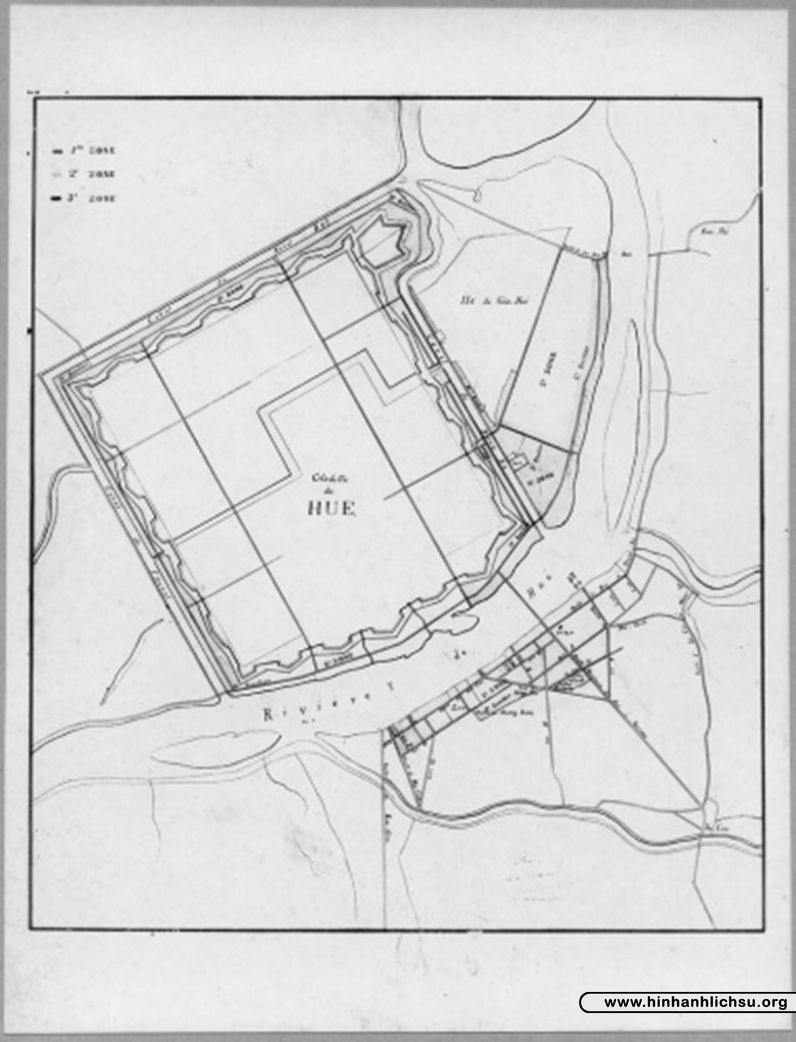
Drawing of Huế citadel in the Nguyễn dynasty in the early 20th century.

The city was also the battleground for the Battle of Huế, which was one of the longest and bloodiest battles of the Vietnam War. During the Republic of Vietnam, Hue, being very near the border between the North and South, was vulnerable in the Vietnam War. In the Tet Offensive of 1968, during the Battle of Huế, the city suffered considerable damage not only to its physical features but also to its reputation from combination of American military bombing of historic buildings held by the North Vietnamese and from the massacre at Huế.

After the war's conclusion in 1975, many of the historic features of Huế were neglected because they were seen by the victorious communist regime and some other Vietnamese as "relics from the feudal regime"; the Communist Party of Vietnam (then Workers' Party of Vietnam) doctrine described the Nguyễn dynasty as "feudal" and "reactionary". With the adoption of liberalizing reforms, however, these hostile policies have been abandoned. Many historic areas of the city are being restored, and the city is quickly developing into a tourism and transportation hub for central Vietnam.

In recognition of Huế's rapid development, the city became Vietnam's sixth centrally-governed municipality in 2025. As part of this process, Huế annexed the rest of Thừa Thiên Huế province to streamline administration.

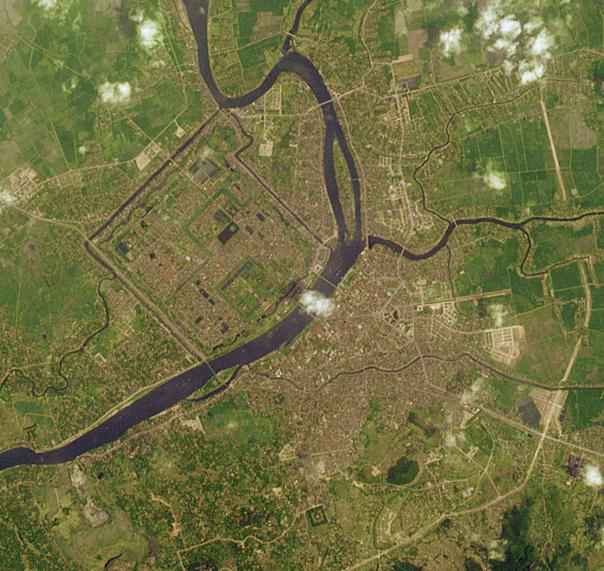
Satellite picture of the city and the Perfume River

== Geography ==
The city is located in central Vietnam on the banks of the Hương River, just a few miles inland from the South China Sea. It is about 700 km (430 mi) south of Hanoi and about 1,100 km (680 mi) north of Ho Chi Minh City. Huế is bordered by Quảng Điền district and South China Sea to the north, Hương Thủy town to the south and east, Phú Vang district to the east and Hương Trà town to the west. Located on the two banks of the Hương River, north of Hải Vân Pass, 105 km (65 mi) from Da Nang, 14 km (8.7 mi) from Thuận An Seaport and Phu Bai International Airport and 50 km (31 mi) from Chân Mây Port. The natural area is 71.68 km^{2} (27.68 sq mi) and the population in 2012 is estimated at 344,581 people. As of 2021, after the territorial expansion, the city has a total area of 265.99 km^{2} (102.70 sq mi) and the population is 652,572 people (including those who are not registered residents).

Located near Trường Sơn mountain range, Huế city is a plain area in the lower reaches of the Perfume River and Bo River, with an average altitude of 3–4 m above sea level and often flooded when the river's headwaters Hương has medium and large rainfall. This plain area is relatively flat, although there are alternating hills and low mountains such as Ngự Bình mountain and Vong Canh Hill.

== Climate ==
Huế features a tropical monsoon climate (Am) under the Köppen climate classification, falling short of a tropical rainforest climate because there is less than 60 millimetres (2.4 in) of rain in March and April. The dry season is from February to August, with high temperatures of 35 to 40 °C (95 to 104 °F). The rainy season is from August to January, with a flood season from October onwards. The average rainy season temperature is 20 °C (68 °F), although it has fallen as low as 9.5 °C (49.1 °F). The highest temperature recorded was 42.2 °C on 27 April 2024, while the lowest was 8.8 °C in January 1934.

Climate data for Huế
Month	Jan	Feb	Mar	Apr	May	Jun	Jul	Aug	Sep	Oct	Nov	Dec	Year
Record high °C (°F)	34.6 (94.3)	36.3 (97.3)	38.6 (101.5)	42.2 (108.0)	42.1 (107.8)	40.7 (105.3)	40.2 (104.4)	40.2 (104.4)	39.7 (103.5)	36.1 (97.0)	35.4 (95.7)	32.2 (90.0)	42.2 (108.0)
Mean daily maximum °C (°F)	23.5 (74.3)	24.5 (76.1)	27.5 (81.5)	31.1 (88.0)	33.5 (92.3)	34.7 (94.5)	34.7 (94.5)	34.2 (93.6)	31.7 (89.1)	29.0 (84.2)	26.5 (79.7)	23.8 (74.8)	29.6 (85.3)
Daily mean °C (°F)	19.9 (67.8)	20.8 (69.4)	23.1 (73.6)	26.1 (79.0)	28.2 (82.8)	29.3 (84.7)	29.2 (84.6)	28.8 (83.8)	27.1 (80.8)	25.3 (77.5)	23.2 (73.8)	20.7 (69.3)	25.1 (77.2)
Mean daily minimum °C (°F)	17.5 (63.5)	18.2 (64.8)	20.2 (68.4)	22.7 (72.9)	24.5 (76.1)	25.3 (77.5)	25.2 (77.4)	25.1 (77.2)	24.1 (75.4)	22.8 (73.0)	21.0 (69.8)	18.6 (65.5)	22.1 (71.8)
Record low °C (°F)	8.8 (47.8)	9.5 (49.1)	10.7 (51.3)	14.1 (57.4)	17.7 (63.9)	20.5 (68.9)	19.8 (67.6)	21.0 (69.8)	19.1 (66.4)	15.9 (60.6)	12.9 (55.2)	9.5 (49.1)	8.8 (47.8)
Average rainfall mm (inches)	129.3 (5.09)	63.3 (2.49)	51.3 (2.02)	58.9 (2.32)	111.3 (4.38)	103.4 (4.07)	94.6 (3.72)	138.8 (5.46)	410.7 (16.17)	772.7 (30.42)	641.7 (25.26)	349.9 (13.78)	2,936.4 (115.61)
Average rainy days	15.5	11.6	10.2	9.2	11.7	9.3	8.5	10.7	16.3	20.8	20.9	20.2	165.1
Average relative humidity (%)	89.6	89.9	87.8	84.1	79.1	75.4	74.1	76.4	83.6	87.7	89.1	90.2	83.9
Mean monthly sunshine hours	104.0	110.3	140.8	175.9	230.9	232.5	236.7	209.9	169.2	130.6	101.2	76.0	1,916.1
Source 1: Vietnam Institute for Building Science and Technology
Source 2: The Yearbook of Indochina

Average sea temperature
Month	Jan	Feb	Mar	Apr	May	Jun	Jul	Aug	Sep	Oct	Nov	Dec	Year
Average temperature °C (°F)	24 °C (75 °F)	23 °C (73 °F)	24 °C (75 °F)	26 °C (79 °F)	28 °C (82 °F)	30 °C (86 °F)	30 °C (86 °F)	30 °C (86 °F)	29 °C (84 °F)	28 °C (82 °F)	27 °C (81 °F)	25 °C (77 °F)	27 °C (81 °F)

== Government ==
Local People's Committee building in Huế (2012).

=== Administrative divisions ===
Hue comprises 36 administrative divisions, including 29 phường (urban wards):

- An Cựu
- An Đông
- An Hòa
- An Tây
- Đông Ba
- Gia Hội
- Hương An
- Hương Hồ
- Hương Long
- Hương Sơ
- Hương Vinh
- Kim Long
- Phú Hậu
- Phú Hội
- Phú Nhuận
- Phú Thượng
- Phước Vĩnh
- Phường Đúc
- Tây Lộc
- Thuận An
- Thuận Hòa
- Thuận Lộc
- Thủy Biều
- Thủy Vân
- Thủy Xuân
- Trường An
- Vĩnh Ninh
- Vỹ Dạ
- Xuân Phú

and 7 xã (rural communes):

- Hải Dương
- Hương Phong
- Hương Thọ
- Phú Dương
- Phú Mậu
- Phú Thanh
- Thủy Bằng

== Culture ==
=== Name-giving ===
Historically, the qualities valued by the royal family were reflected in its name-giving customs, which came to be adopted by society at large. As a rule, royal family members were named after a poem written by Minh Mạng, the second emperor of the Nguyễn dynasty. The poem, "Đế hệ thi", has been set as a standard frame to name every generation of the royal family, through which people can know the family order as well as the relationship between royal members. More importantly, the names reflect the essential personality traits that the royal regime would like their offspring to uphold. This name-giving tradition is proudly kept alive and nowadays people from Huế's royal family branches (normally considered 'pure' Huế) still have their names taken from the words in the poem.

=== Clothing ===
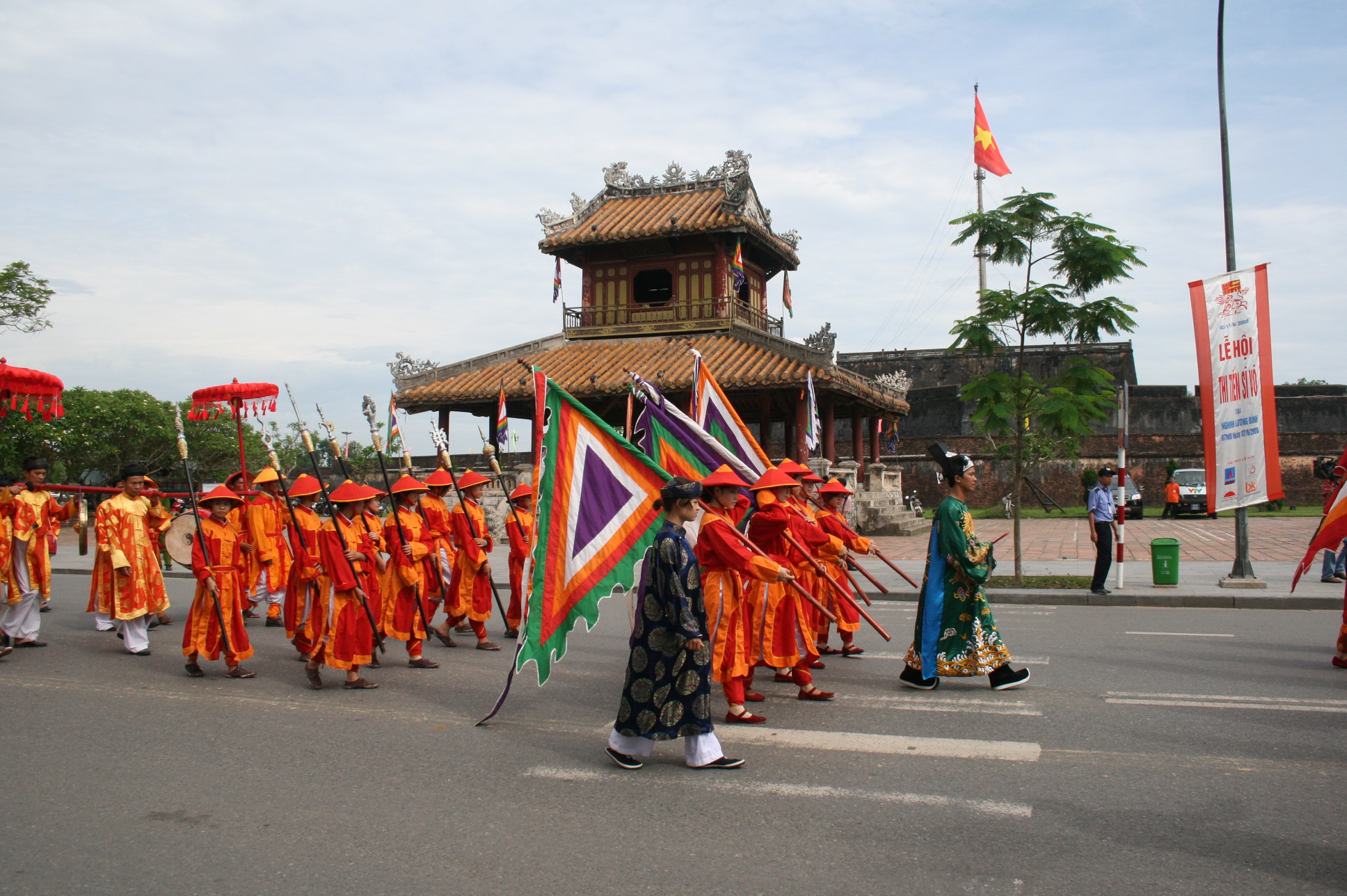
Festival in Huế

The design of the modern-day áo dài, a Vietnamese national costume, developed from the costumes worn by civilians in Đàng Trong in the 18th century after the costume reform of lord Nguyễn Phúc Khoát. A court historian of the time described the rules of dress as follows:

Thường phục thì đàn ông, đàn bà dùng áo cổ đứng ngắn tay, cửa ống tay rộng hoặc hẹp tùy tiện. Áo thì hai bên nách trở xuống phải khâu kín liền, không được xẻ mở. Duy đàn ông không muốn mặc áo cổ tròn ống tay hẹp cho tiện khi làm việc thì được phép.

Outside court, men and women wear gowns with straight collars and short sleeves. The sleeves are large or small depending on the weather. There are seams on both sides running down from the sleeve, so the gown is not open anywhere. Men may wear a round collar and a short sleeve for more convenience.

— Đại Nam thực lục (Note: Đại Nam thực lục)

This outfit evolved into the áo ngũ thân, a type of five-part costume popular in Vietnam in the 19th and early 20th centuries. Inspired by Paris fashions, Nguyễn Cát Tường and other artists associated with Hanoi University redesigned the ngũ thân to create the modern áo dài in the 1920s and 1930s. While the áo dài and nón lá are generally seen as a symbol of Vietnam as a whole, the combination is seen by Vietnamese as being particularly evocative of Hue. Violet-coloured áo dài are especially common in Huế, the color having a special connection to the city's heritage as a former capital.

=== Cuisine ===
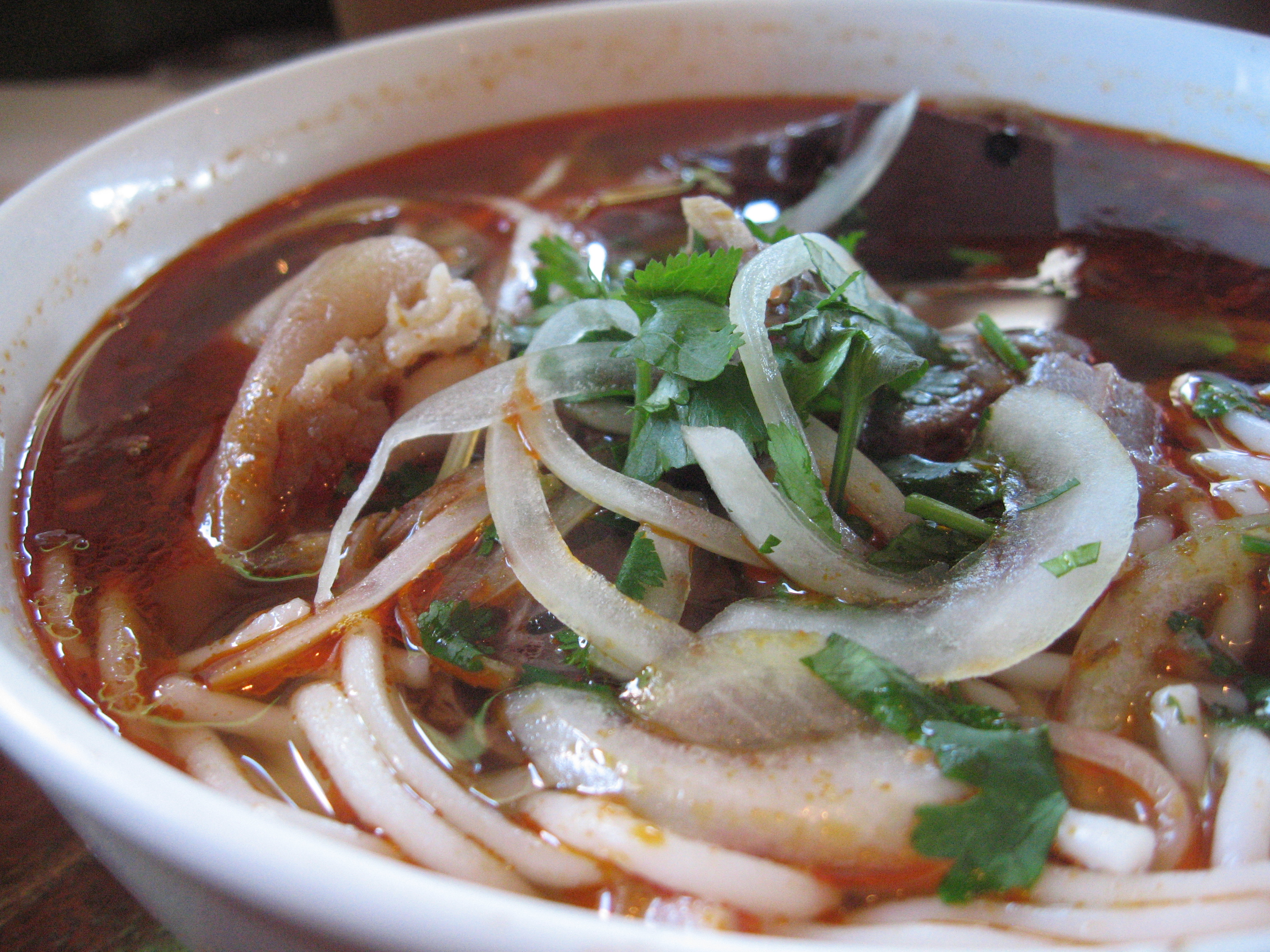
Bún bò Huế, a typical noodle dish

The cuisine of Huế forms the heart of Central Vietnamese cuisine, but one of the most striking differences is the prominence of vegetarianism in the city. Several all-vegetarian restaurants are scattered in various corners of the city to serve the locals who have a strong tradition of eating a vegetarian meal twice a month, as part of their Buddhist beliefs. Nam Châu Hội Quán is a traditional dining hall. Hue dishes are known for their relatively small serving size with refined presentation, a vestige of its royal cuisine. Hue cuisine is notable for often being very spicy.

Hue cuisine has both luxurious and popular rustic dishes. It consists of several distinctive dishes from small and delicate creations, originally made to please the appetites of Nguyen feudal lords, emperors, and their hundreds of concubines and wives.

Besides Bún bò Huế, other famous dishes include:

- Bánh bèo is a Vietnamese dish that originally comes from Hue city. It is made from a combination of rice flour and tapioca flour. The ingredients include rice cakes, marinated-dried shrimps and crispy pork skin, scallion oil and dipping source. It can be considered as street food, and can eat as lunch or dinner.
- Cơm hến (baby basket clams rice) is a Vietnamese dish originating in Huế. It is made with baby mussels or basket clams and rice; it is normally served at room temperature.
- Bánh ướt thịt nướng (steamed rice pancake with grilled pork) is the most well-known dish of people of Kim Long- Huế. The ingredients include steamed rice pancake, vegetables – Vietnamese mint herb, basil leaves, lettuce, cucumber and cinnamon leaves, pork and is served with dipping sauce.
- Bánh khoái (Hue shrimp and vegetable pancake) is the modified form of Bánh xèo. It is deep fried and served with Hue peanut dipping sauce containing pork liver. Its ingredients include egg, liver, prawns and pork belly or pork sausage, and carrot. It is served with lettuce, fresh mint, Vietnamese mint, star fruit, and perilla leaves.
- Bánh bột lọc (Vietnamese clear shrimp and pork dumplings) can be wrapped with or without banana leaf. It is believed to originate from Huế, Vietnam during the Nguyễn dynasty. Main ingredients include tapioca flour, shrimps and pork belly; it is often served with sweet chili fish sauce.
- Banh it ram (fried sticky rice dumpling) is a specialty in Central Vietnam. It is the combination of fried sticky rice dumplings which is sticky, soft and chewy, and crispy stick rice cake at the bottom.
- Nem lụi Huế (grilled pork skewers) is a traditional dish of Huế cuisine, made from minced pork mixed with spices and wrapped around lemongrass sticks before being grilled. It is commonly served with rice paper, fresh herbs, green banana, star fruit, and a peanut-based dipping sauce.
- Chè Huế (Vietnamese sweet soups) is a group of traditional sweet soups from Huế. The city is known for its wide variety of chè, including lotus seed sweet soup, mung bean sweet soup, taro sweet soup, and longan and lotus seed sweet soup. These desserts are associated with Huế’s royal and folk culinary traditions.

Additionally, Hue is also famous for its delicious sweet desserts such as Lotus seeds sweet soups, Lotus seed wrapped in logan sweet soup, Areca flower sweet soup, Grilled pork wrapped in cassava flour sweet soup, and Green sticky rice sweet soup.

=== Religion ===
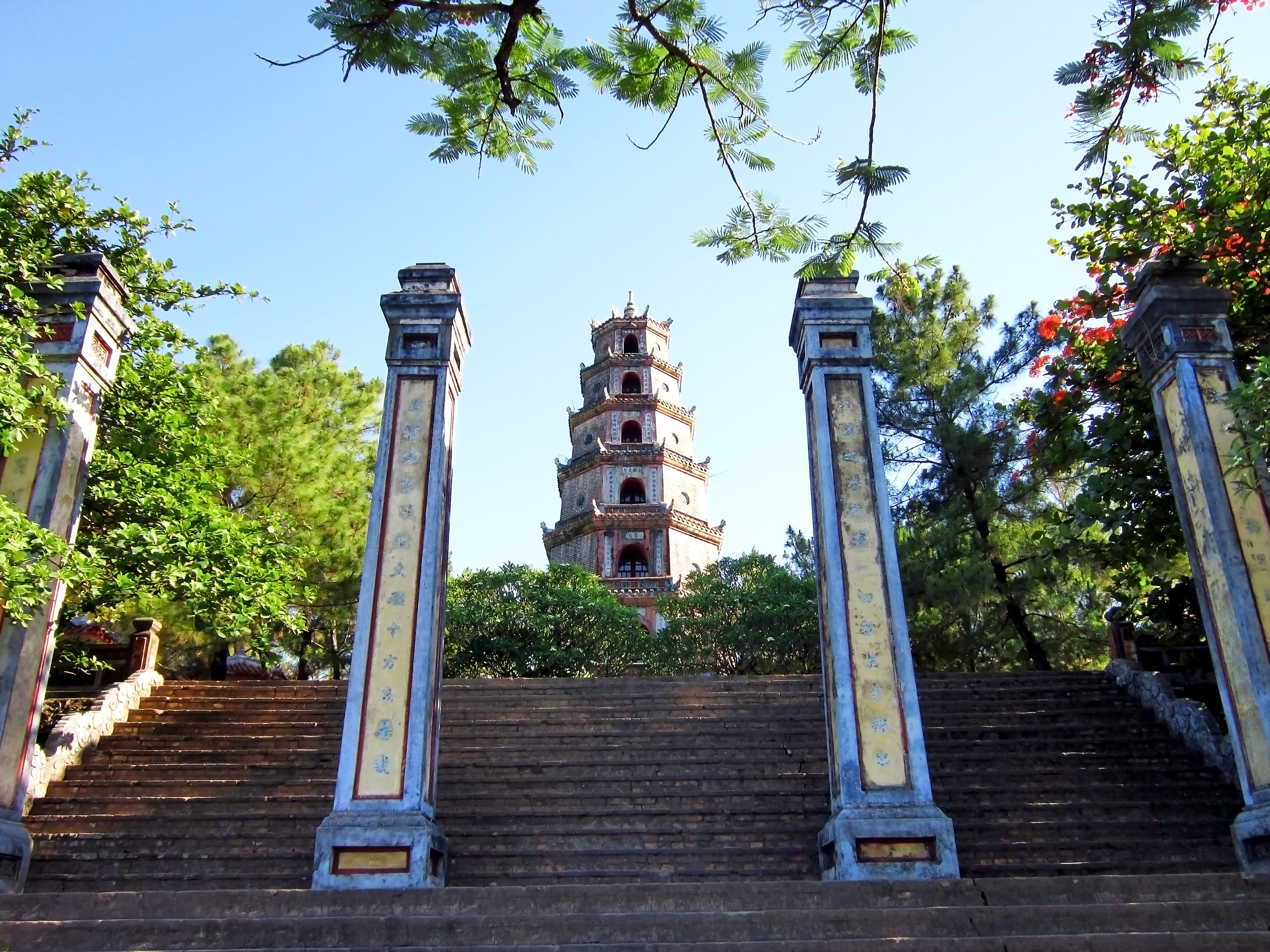
Pagoda of the Celestial Lady

The imperial court practiced various religions such as Buddhism, Taoism and Confucianism. The most important altar was the Esplanade of Sacrifice to the Heaven and Earth, where the monarch would offer each year prayers to the Heaven and Earth.

In Huế, Buddhism enjoyed stronger support than elsewhere in Vietnam, with more monasteries than anywhere else in the country serving as home to the nation's most famous monks.

In 1963, Thích Quảng Đức drove from Huế to Saigon to protest anti-Buddhist policies of the South Vietnamese government, setting himself on fire on a Saigon street. Photos of the self-immolation became some of the enduring images of the Vietnam War.

Thích Nhất Hạnh, a world-famous Zen master who originated from Hue and lived for years in exile including France and the United States, returned to his home town in October 2018 and resided there at the Tu Hieu pagoda until his death in 2022.

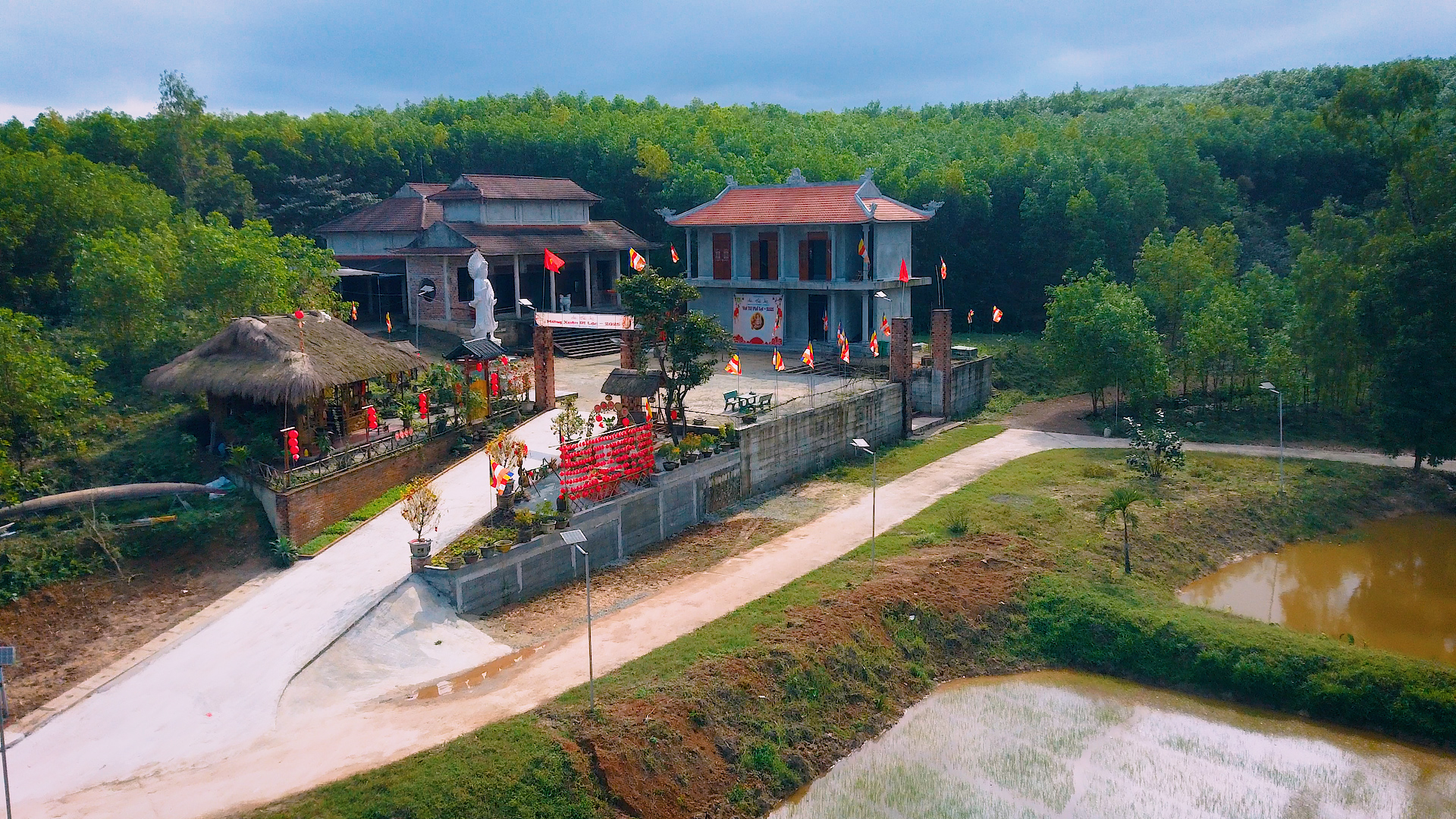
Chùa Phổ Lại in Phong Thái Ward, Huế City, Vietnam

Among Buddhist sites in the surrounding midland area of Huế is Chùa Phổ Lại, which hosts religious, cultural, and community activities.

=== Tourism ===
Complex of Huế Monuments
UNESCO World Heritage Site
- Interactive map of Complex of Huế Monuments
- Criteria: Cultural: iv
- Reference: 678
- Inscription: 1993 (17th Session)
- Area: 315.47 ha (779.5 acres)
- Buffer zone: 71.93 ha (177.7 acres)

Huế is well known for its historic monuments, which have earned it a place in UNESCO's World Heritage Sites. The seat of the Nguyễn emperors was the Imperial City, which occupies a large, walled area on the north side of the Perfume River. Inside the citadel was a forbidden city where only the emperors, concubines, and those close enough to them were granted access; the punishment for trespassing was death. Today, little of the forbidden city remains, though reconstruction efforts are in progress to maintain it as a historic tourist attraction.

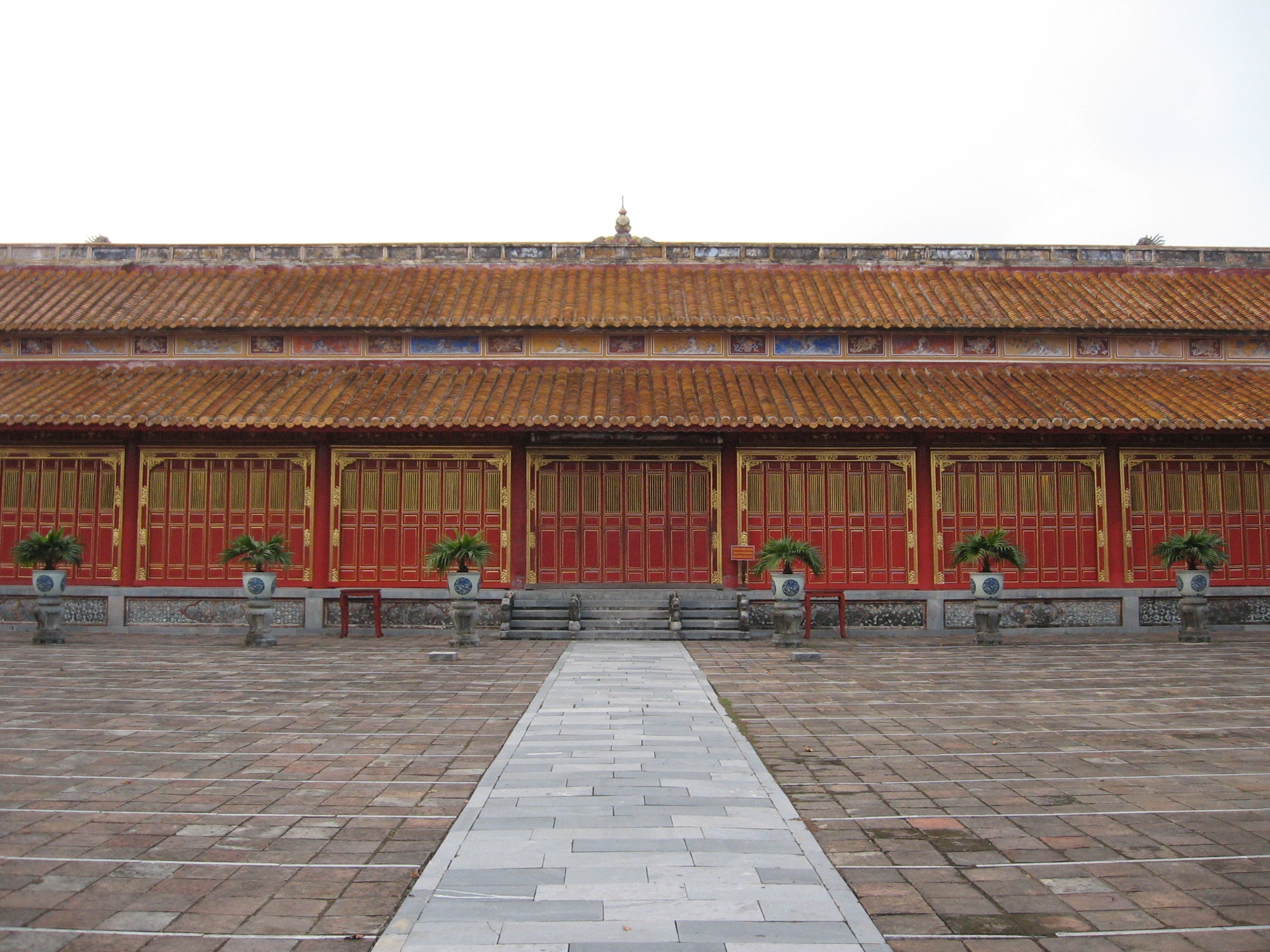
Forbidden Purple City of Hue, once the emperor's home.

Roughly along the Perfume River from Huế lie myriad other monuments, including the tombs of several emperors, including Minh Mạng, Khải Định, and Tự Đức. Also notable is the Thiên Mụ Temple, the largest pagoda in Huế and the official symbol of the city.

A number of French-style buildings lie along the south bank of the Perfume River. Among them are Hue High School for the Gifted, the oldest high school in Vietnam, and Hai Ba Trung High School.

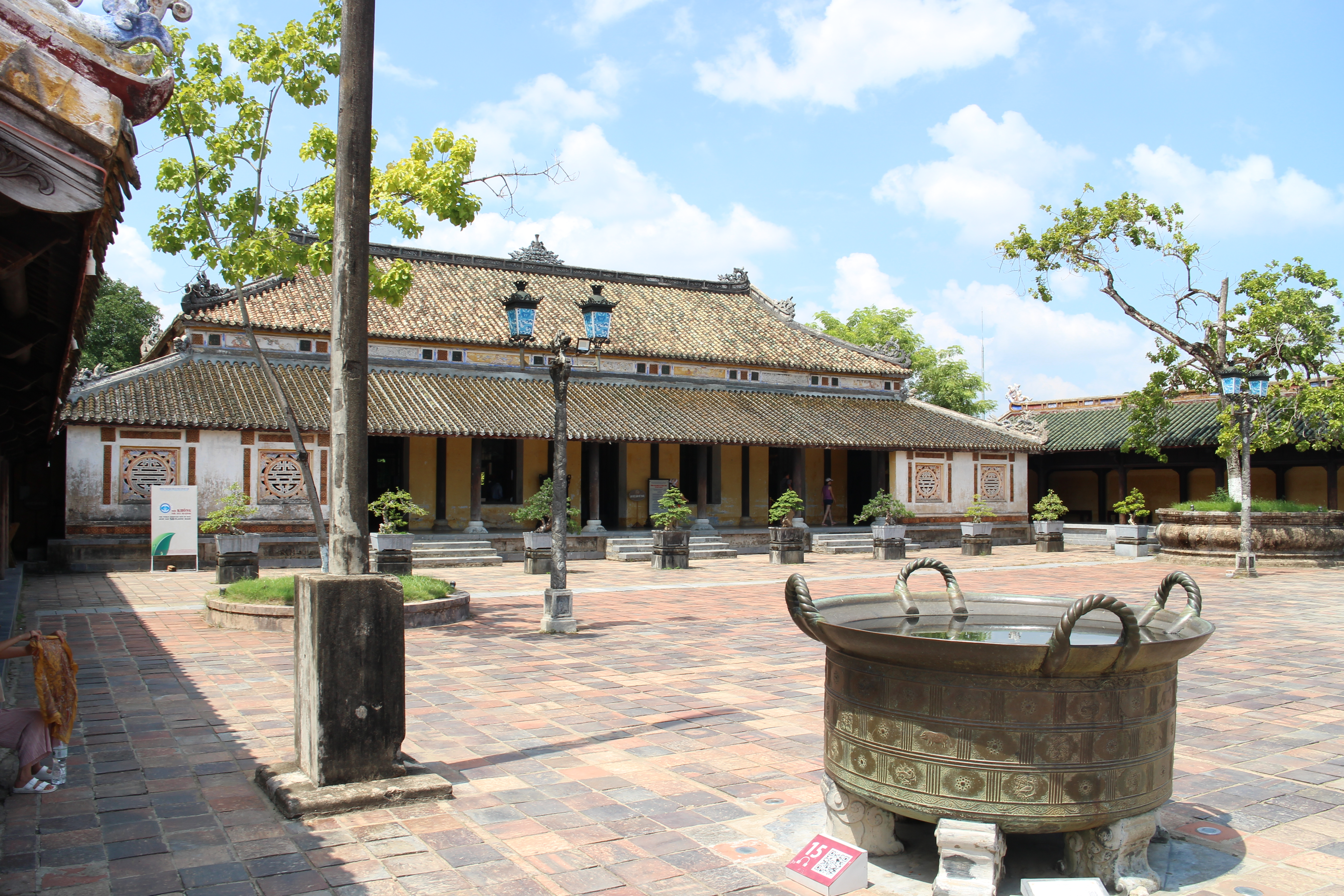
Imperial City of Huế, containing palaces and shrines

The Huế Museum of Royal Fine Arts on 3 Le Truc Street also maintains a collection of various artifacts from the city. In addition to the various touristic attractions in Hue itself, the city also offers day-trips to the Demilitarized Zone lying approximately 70 km (43 mi) north, showing various war settings like The Rockpile, Khe Sanh Combat Base or the Vịnh Mốc tunnels. Most of the hotels, bars, and restaurants for tourists in Hue are located in Pham Ngu Lao, Chu Van An and Vo Thi Sau street, which together form the backpacker district.

In the first 11 months of 2012, Hue received 2.4 million visitors, an increase of 24.6% from the same period of 2011. 803,000 of those 2.4 million visitors were foreign guests, an increase of 25.7%. Although tourism plays a key role in the city's socioeconomic development, it also has negative impacts on the environment and natural resource base. For example, services associated with tourism, such as travel, the development of infrastructure and its operation, and the production and consumption of goods, are all energy-intensive. Research by the Climate and Development Knowledge Network has identified traditional 'garden houses' as having the potential to increase tourist traffic and revenue. Apart from the environmental, economic and cultural benefits provided by garden houses, their promotion could pave the way for other low carbon development initiatives.

== Infrastructure ==
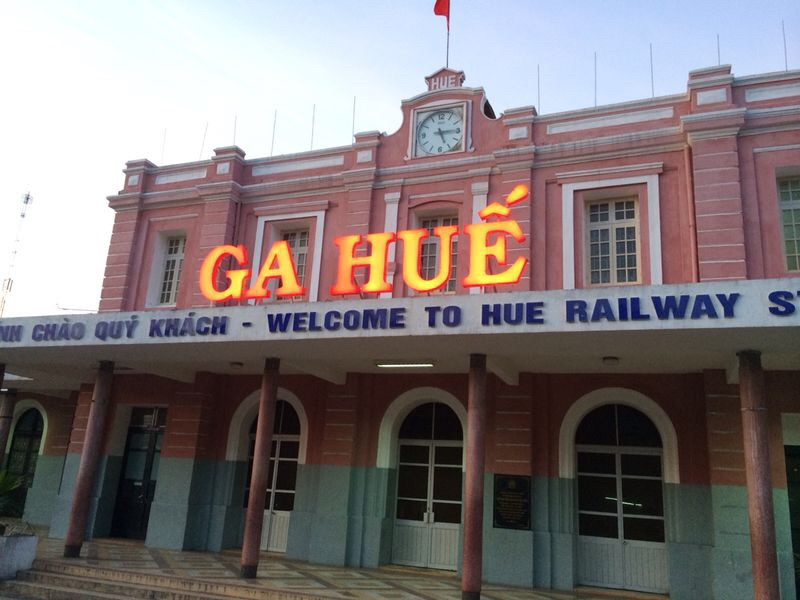
Huế railway station

=== Health ===
The Huế Central Hospital, established in 1894, was the first Western hospital in Vietnam. The hospital, providing 2078 beds and occupying 120,000 square meters (30 acres), is one of three largest in the country along with Bach Mai Hospital in Hanoi and Cho Ray Hospital in Ho Chi Minh City, and is managed by the Ministry of Health.

=== Transportation ===
Huế railway station provides a rail connection to major Vietnamese cities, via the North–South railway. Phu Bai International Airport is just south of the city centre.

== Sister cities ==
- Bandar-e Anzali, Iran
- Honolulu, Hawaii, United States
- New Haven, Connecticut, United States
- Blois, France, Centre-Val de Loire, since May 2007
- Phra Nakhon Si Ayutthaya province, Thailand
- Vancouver, Canada

== See also ==
- List of historical capitals of Vietnam
