= Huế station =

Railway station in Vietnam

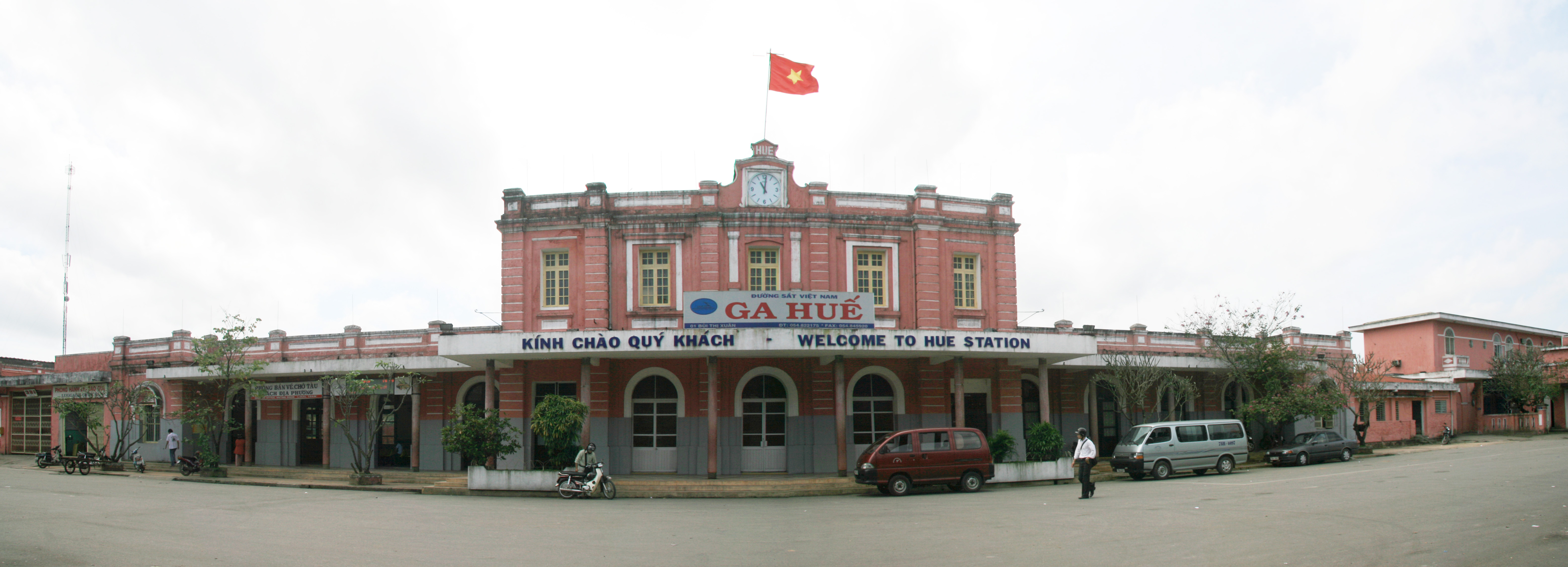

General information
- Location: 2 Bùi Thị Xuân Street, Đúc ward, Thuận Hóa district, Huế; Vietnam
- Coordinates: 16°27′23.5″N 107°34′40″E
- Owner: Vietnam Railways
- Operator: Vietnam Railways
- Platforms: 2
- Tracks: 3
- Connections: Taxi

Construction
- Structure type: Ground
- Parking: Yes

Services
Preceding station	Vietnam Railways	Following station
Đông Hà towards Hanoi	North–South	Thanh Khê towards Saigon
Location

Huế station is a railway station in the city of Huế, Vietnam on the main North–South railway. The street address is No.2 Bùi Thị Xuân Street, Huế City, Thừa Thiên–Huế Province, Vietnam (now is Thuận Hóa District, Municipality of Huế).

The station was built by the French colonial authorities during the French Indochina period. The station is influenced by French architecture and is today considered one of the most beautiful railway stations in Vietnam. Built by the French Public Works Department, it was considered a "rectangular horror" according to a source from 1913. During the Vietnam War in the Battle of Hue the station housed snipers but U.S. troops drove them out.

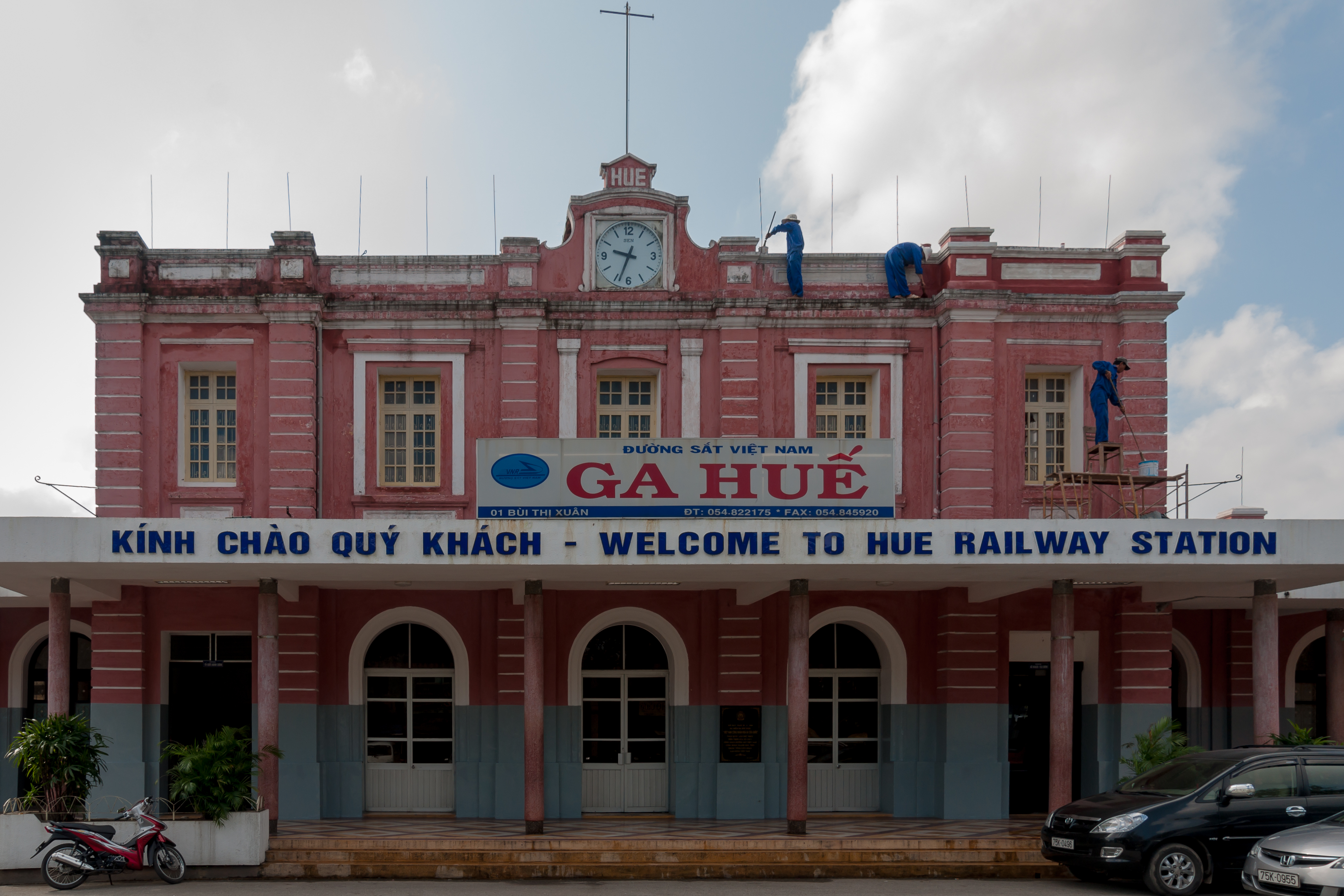
Hue station
