= Đàn Tiên Nông =

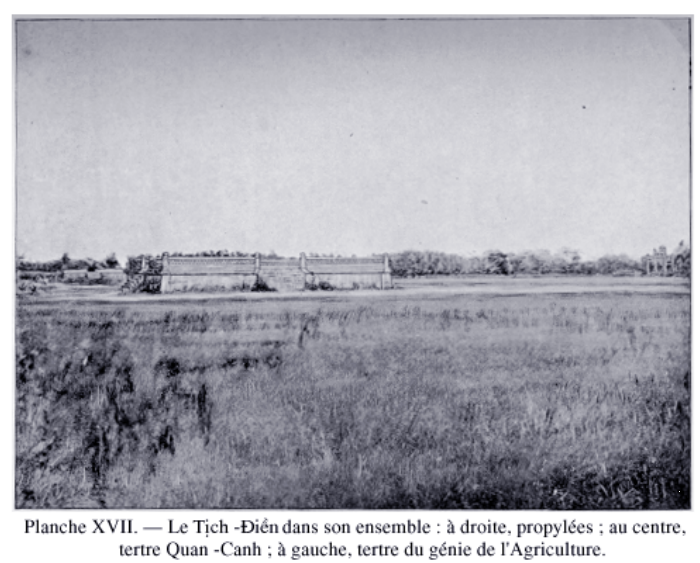
- Đàn Tiên Nông and Tịch Điền rice fields

Religion
- Affiliation: Hinduism

Location
- Location: Tây Lộc Ward, Hue City

Architecture
- Type: Temple
- Creator: Minh Mạng

Đàn Tiên Nông is a temple built during the reign of Minh Mạng (1828) between the Hậu Sinh and An Trạch wards, now located in Tây Lộc Ward in the northwest of the Imperial City of Hue, in Vietnam. The temple is where the main rituals of the Tịch điền took place, a ceremony in which the emperor personally plowed the fields. Today, Đàn Tiên Nông is only a ruin buried among residential areas, but records and images still exist in ancient texts.

== History ==
The Nguyễn Dynasty placed great importance on agriculture, and each year, before sowing, a seasonal schedule was arranged. After the Royal Astronomical Bureau, responsible for astronomy, weather forecasting, and creating the calendar, prepared the schedule, the court organized the Ban Sóc ceremony to present it to the royal family for use. The calendar was distributed to officials in the capital, localities, and the general public for their use.

The Tịch Điền field during the reign of Gia Long was located in Hòa Thái and Ngưỡng Trị wards within the Imperial City, but in 1828, noticing that the land was low and marshy, Emperor Minh Mạng ordered it to be moved to the An Trạch and Hậu Sinh wards.

According to the book Đại Nam Thực Lục Chính Biên, Second Series, to honor agriculture, in February of the Year of the Rat (1828), Emperor Minh Mạng issued a decree to construct the Đàn Tiên Nông for the Tịch điền ceremony between the two wards of Hậu Sinh and An Trạch (now Tây Lộc Ward in the northwest of the Imperial City of Hue):

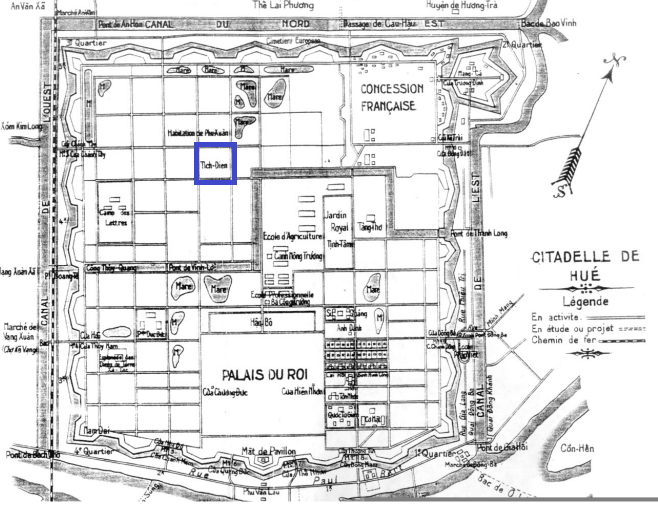

The emperor said to his ministers: "In ancient times, the emperor plowed the Tịch Điền fields to obtain rice for offerings to the Giao Miếu and to understand the weather for advising farmers. It is indeed a significant matter in governance. The three-field plowing rite is documented in literature. In our country during the Trần and Lê dynasties, there were ceremonies of this nature, but mostly they were simplified. I have been thinking of the people from the start and have always prioritized teaching them the importance of agriculture. Now, the court is idle and seeks to revive ancient practices; it is indeed a matter that should be prioritized. Therefore, we must choose land within the capital for the Tịch Điền." He ordered the establishment at the Hậu Sinh and An Trạch wards, a tower called Quan Canh to be built on the left, with a ceremonial field in front and a garment-changing palace behind, on the right to establish the Đàn Tiên Nông and the Thần Thương shrine to harvest grain. He appointed Trung Quân Tống Phước Lương to oversee the work, rewarding workers and military personnel with 5,000 quan. Additionally, a cultivation site (plowing area) was designated north of the Khánh Ninh Palace, called Vĩnh Trạch Garden. The Ministry of Rites was ordered to determine the ceremonial rites. Annually, in the month of trọng Hạ (May), an auspicious day was chosen for the ceremony.

The temple is square, one story, facing south, with a high foundation tiled with bricks, having pre-made holes for ceremonial flags and umbrellas, surrounded by brick railings, with nine steps on all four sides leading up and down. On the temple, there is a small house for the emperor to observe the plowing of the fields. Directly in front of the temple is the area where the emperor personally plows during the Tịch điền Festival.

The book Khâm định Đại Nam Hội điển sự lệ records that in the last week of April each year, the Royal Astronomical Bureau selects an auspicious day for plowing the Tịch Điền field. Before proceeding, the Ministry of Rites reports to the emperor to perform the ritual at the Đàn Tiên Nông. At the beginning of the hour of Tý, the Ministry of Rites will prepare the altars and offerings, including buffalo, goat, pig, sticky rice, and five trays of fruit. At the beginning of the fifth watch of the Tịch Điền Festival, the governor of Thừa Thiên, dressed in ceremonial attire, arrives at the Đàn Tiên Nông to conduct the ritual, followed by the emperor's Tịch Điền ceremony.

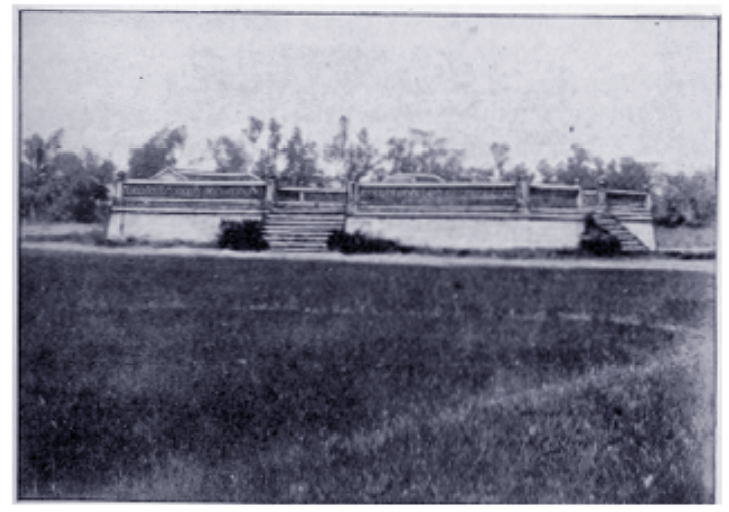

After the Nguyễn Dynasty ended, the rituals at the Đàn Tiên Nông and the plowing of the Tịch Điền field were no longer held in Hue. Today, the remnants of the Đàn Tiên Nông area and Tịch Điền fields in Tây Lộc Ward are no longer present, and the Hue Monuments Conservation Center has no plans for restoration.

== Tịch Điền Festival in the Imperial City of Hue ==
During the Nguyễn period, the Tịch Điền Festival was considered one of the three most important ceremonies of the court (Nam Giao Ceremony, Xã Tắc Ceremony, and Tịch Điền Festival).

The procedures for performing the Tịch Điền Festival at Đàn Tiên Nông are as follows: the emperor personally plows three fields, ceremoniously offering three fields of newly plowed rice to the heavenly gods, the earth gods, and the people, thus symbolizing the emperor's concern for agricultural production and the people's well-being. This ceremonial act is linked to agricultural policies and aligns with the state’s responsibilities and duties to the people in the Nguyễn Dynasty.

In modern times, the Hue Monuments Conservation Center has sought to revive the festival at Đàn Tiên Nông, held every year at the end of the lunar month of Tịch Điền, allowing local people to participate in traditional cultural activities. The festival is not only a place for cultural and agricultural activities but also reflects the historical significance of the Tịch Điền ceremony in the context of the royal court in the past.
