= Phú Xuân district =

Coordinates: 16°29′1″N 107°34′21″E

Phú Xuân district Quận Phú Xuân
- Urban district
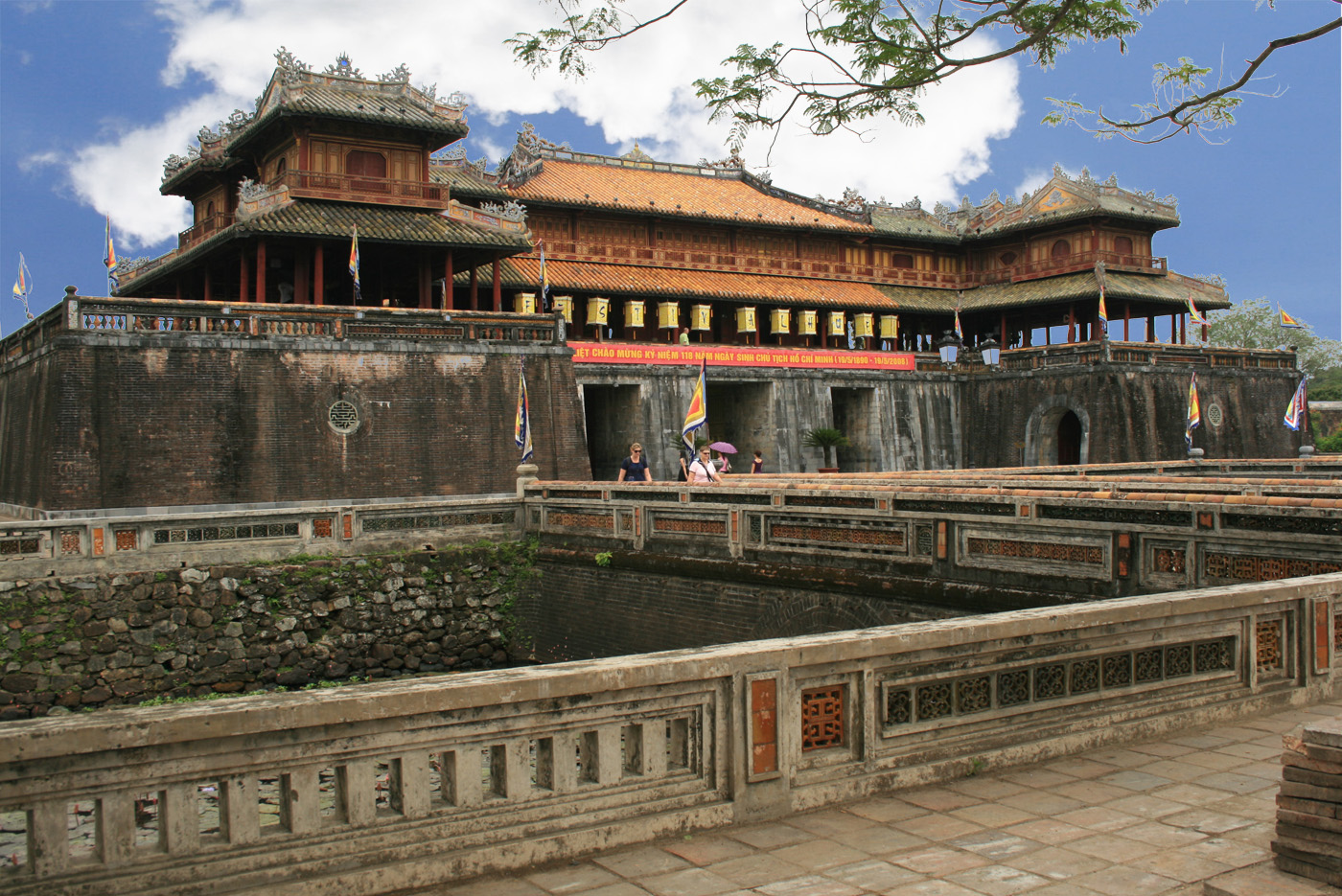
- Interactive map of Phú Xuân district
- Country: Vietnam
- Province: Huế

Area
  - Total: 49.05 sq mi (127.05 km^{2})

Population (2023)
  - Total: 203,142
  - Density: 4,140/sq mi (1,599/km^{2})
- Time zone: UTC+7 (Indochina Time)

Phú Xuân is an urban district of Huế in the North Central Coast region of Vietnam. It was formed on 1 January 2025, when the former Huế city was split into two urban districts: Phú Xuân and Thuận Hóa.

== Administrative divisions ==
Phú Xuân district is divided into 13 wards (Phường):

- An Hòa
- Đông Ba
- Gia Hội
- Hương An
- Hương Long
- Hương Sơ
- Hương Vinh
- Long Hồ
- Kim Long
- Phú Hậu
- Thuận Hòa
- Thuận Lộc
- Tây Lộc
