= Thuận Hóa district =

Coordinates: 16°27′58″N 107°36′17″E

Thuận Hóa district Quận Thuận Hóa
- Urban district
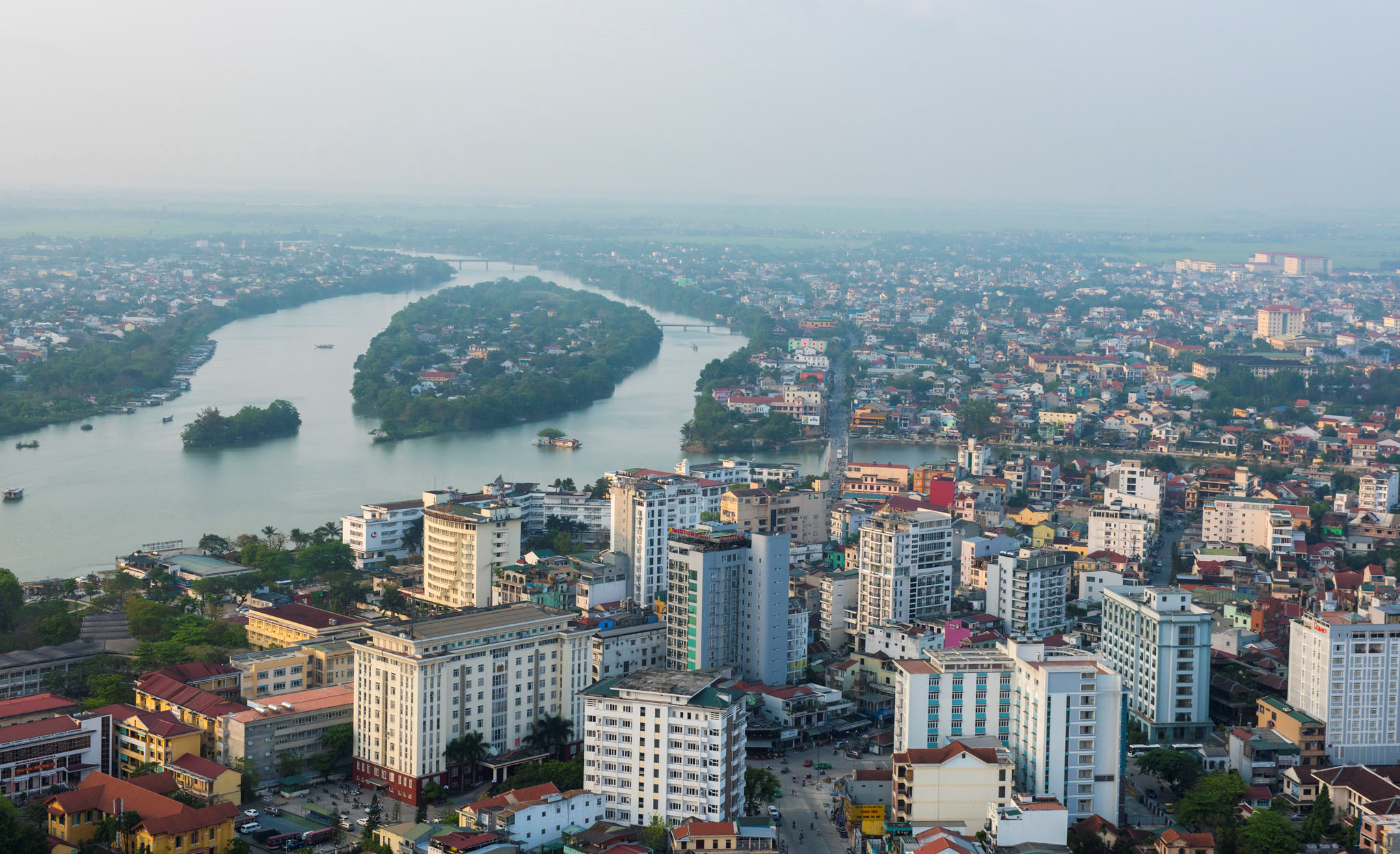
- Interactive map of Thuận Hóa district
- Country: Vietnam
- Province: Huế

Area
  - Total: 53.83 sq mi (139.41 km^{2})

Population (2023)
  - Total: 297,507
  - Density: 5,530/sq mi (2,134/km^{2})
- Time zone: UTC+7 (Indochina Time)

Thuận Hóa is an urban district of Huế in the North Central Coast region of Vietnam. It was formed on 1 January 2025, when the former Huế city was split into two urban districts: Phú Xuân and Thuận Hóa.

== Administrative divisions ==
Thuận Hóa district is divided into wards (Phường):

- An Cựu
- An Đông
- An Tây
- Dương Nỗ
- Hương Phong
- Phú Hội
- Phú Nhuận
- Phú Thượng
- Phước Vĩnh
- Phường Đúc
- Thuận An
- Thủy Bằng
- Thủy Biều
- Thủy Vân
- Thủy Xuân
- Trường An
- Vĩnh Ninh
- Vỹ Dạ
- Xuân Phú
