= Hương Thủy =

- Ward
- Interactive map of Hương Thủy
- Coordinates: 16.423548070307643°N 107.65986010413704°E
- Country: Vietnam
- Municipality: Huế
- Region: North Central Coast
- Established: 16 June 2025
- People's Committee headquarters: 749 Nguyễn Tất Thành

Area
  - Total: 33.93 km^{2} (13.10 sq mi)

Population (2025)
  - Total: 29,192
  - Density: 860/km^{2} (2,200/sq mi)

Hương Thủy is a ward of Huế, Vietnam.

On 16 June 2025, the Standing Committee of the National Assembly of Vietnam issued Resolution No. 1675/NQ-UBTVQH15 on the reorganization of commune-level administrative units of Huế in 2025. Under the resolution, the entire natural area and population of Thủy Lương Ward, Thủy Châu Ward, and Thủy Tân Commune, all formerly part of Hương Thủy town, were merged to form a new ward named Hương Thủy.
