= Thuận An, Huế =

Thuận An Phường Thuận An
- Ward
- Interactive map of Thuận An
- Coordinates: 16°32′56″N 107°38′37″E
- Country: Vietnam
- Region: North Central Coast
- Province: Huế

Area
  - Total: 6.29 sq mi (16.28 km^{2})

Population (2020)
  - Total: 20,972
  - Density: 3,340/sq mi (1,288/km^{2})
- Time zone: UTC+7 (UTC + 7)
- Climate: Am

Thuận An is a ward of Huế, Vietnam. As of 2020, the ward covers area of 16.28 km^{2} with population of 20,972 and population density of 1,288 citizens/km^{2}.

Formerly a township of Phú Vang district, Thuận An was incorporated by Huế in 2021 and became a ward of the city ever since.
