= Thiên Mụ Temple =

Historical Buddhist temple in the Thừa Thiên Huế province of Vietnam

Coordinates: 16.453599°N 107.544812°E

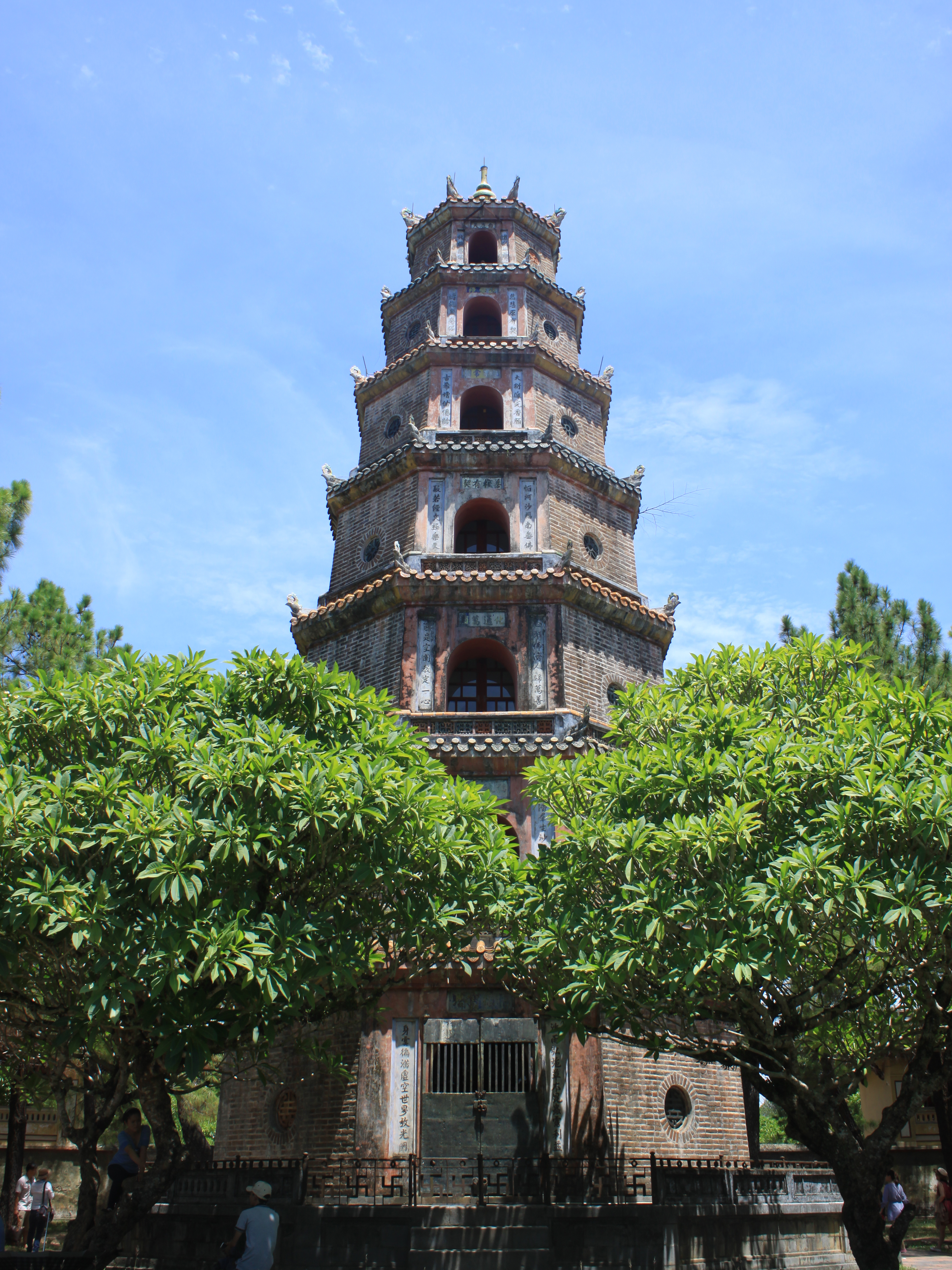

Vietnamese name
- Vietnamese alphabet: Chùa Thiên Mụ
- Chữ Hán: 天姥寺
- Chữ Nôm: 𫴶天姥

The Thiên Mụ Temple (meaning Temple of the Celestial Lady, Vietnamese: Chùa Thiên Mụ; also called Linh Mụ Temple) is a historic temple in the city of Huế in Vietnam. Its iconic seven-story Phước Duyên pagoda is regarded as the unofficial symbol of the city, and the temple has often been the subject of folk rhymes and ca dao about Huế.

The temple sits on the Hà Khê hill, in the ward of Hương Long in Huế. It is around 5 kilometres (3.1 mi) from the Citadel of Huế constructed by the first emperor of the Nguyễn dynasty on the site of a pre-existing shrine and sits on the northern bank of the Perfume River.

== History ==
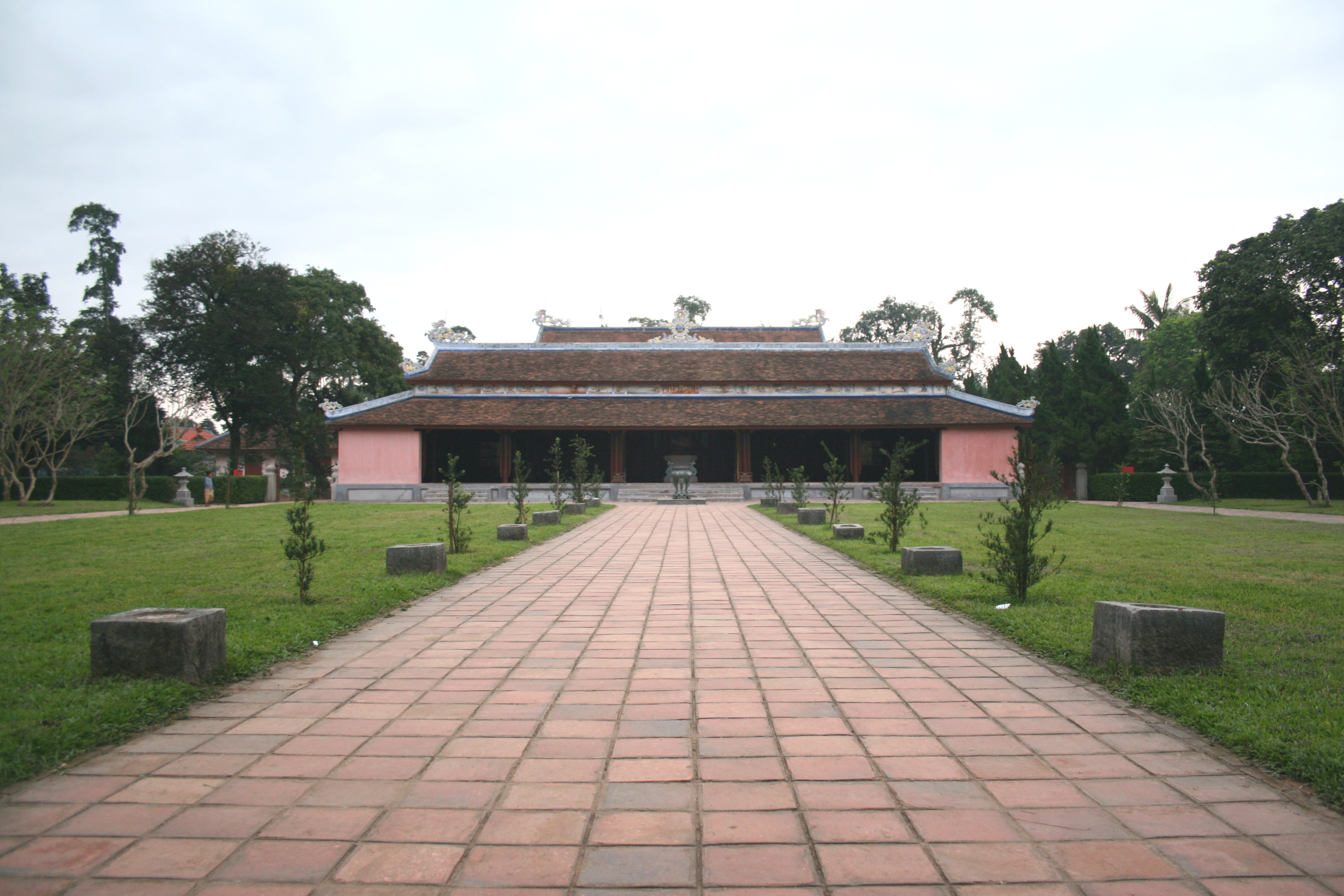
Chính điện

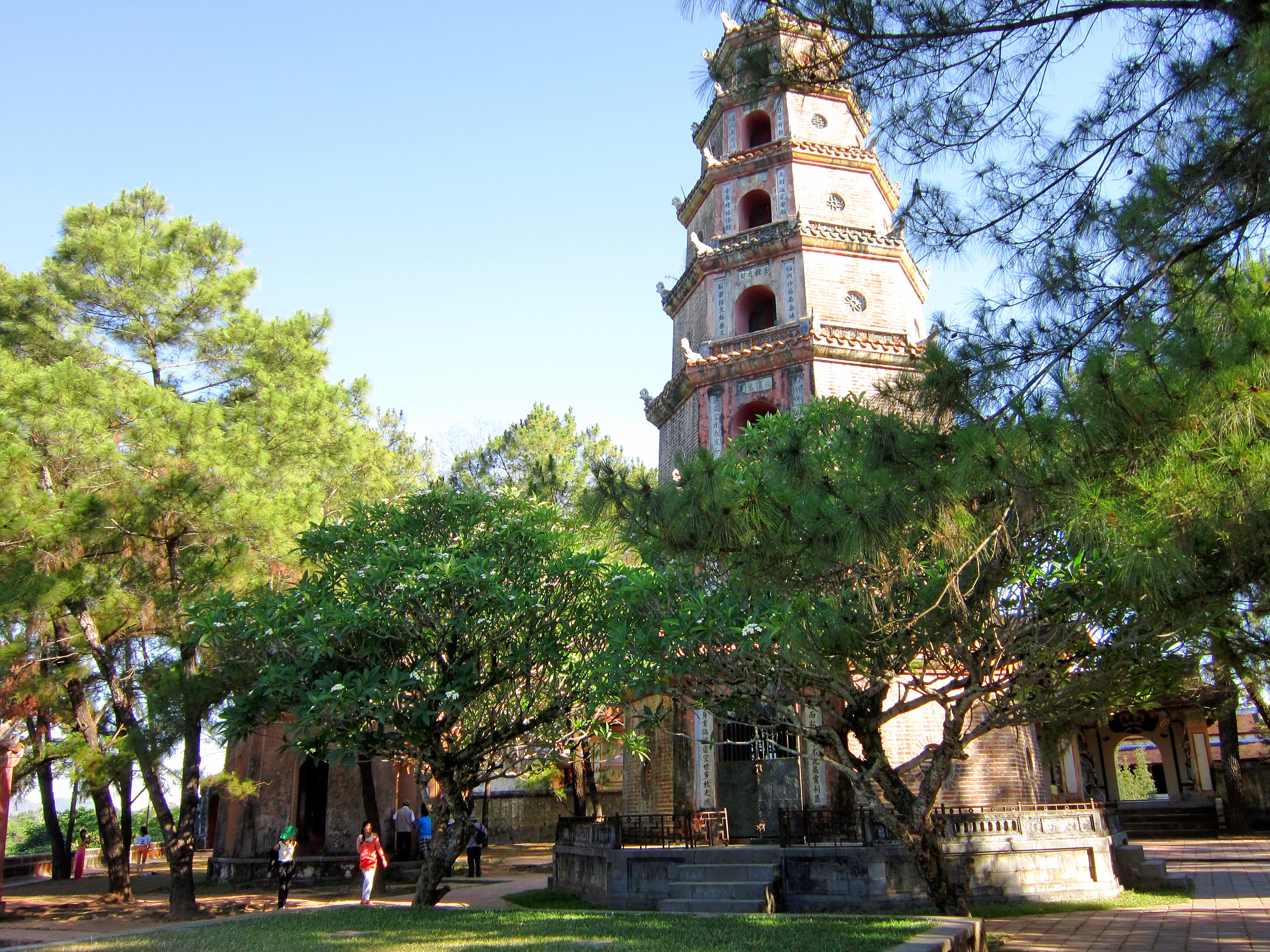
Tháp Phước Duyên

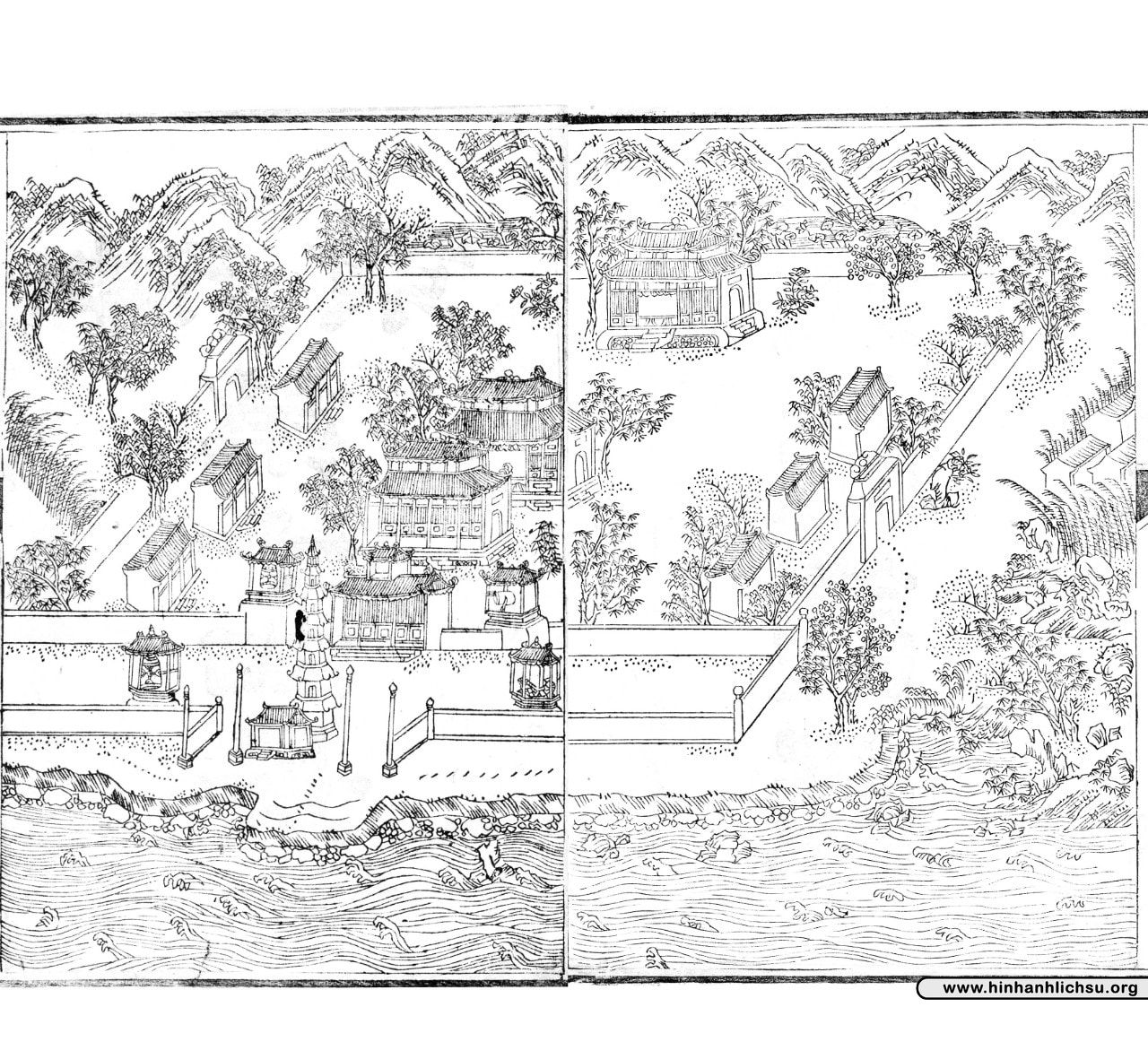
Thiên Mụ Temple in the Thần kinh thập nhị cảnh (神京二十景) set of landscape paintings painted in the 5th year of Thiệu Trị, 1845

Built in 1601 on the order of the first Nguyễn lords, Nguyễn Hoàng, who at that time was the governor of Thuận Hóa (now known as Huế). The Nguyen Lords were in name, officials of the ruling Lê dynasty in Hanoi, but was the de facto independent ruler of central Vietnam. According to the royal annals, Hoang while touring the vicinity, was told of the local legend in which an old lady, known as Thiên Mụ (literally "celestial lady"), dressed in red and blue sat at the site, rubbing her cheeks. She foretold that a lord would come and erect a pagoda on the hill to pray for the country's prosperity. She then vanished after making her prophecy. Upon hearing this, Hoang ordered the construction of a temple at the site, thus the beginning of Thiên Mụ Tự. The Goddess is an adaptation of a pre-existing Cham goddess, Po Nagar.

The original temple was simply constructed, then later expanded and refurbished. In 1665, major construction was undertaken by the Nguyễn Lord Nguyễn Phúc Tần.

In 1695, the Zen Master Shi Da Shan (Chinese: 釋大汕; pinyin: shìdàshān, or the Vietnamese transliteration "Thích Đại Sán"), a member of the Caodong school (Chinese: 曹洞宗; pinyin: cáodòngzōng, or the Vietnamese transliteration "Tào Động Tông"), arrived from China. He had been invited to come to Huế as a guest of the Nguyễn Lords to start a Buddhist congregation and oversee its development. He was a noted Buddhist scholar of the Qing dynasty and was patronised by the ruling Lord Nguyễn Phúc Chu and was appointed as the abbot of the pagoda. In the seventh month of 1696, he returned to China, but conferred bodhisattva vows on Chu.

In 1710, Chu funded the casting of a giant bell, which weighs 3,285 kg, and was regarded as one of the most prized cultural relics of its time in Vietnam. The bell is said to be audible 10 kilometres (6.2 mi) away and has been the subject of many poems and songs, including one by Emperor Thiệu Trị of the Nguyễn dynasty who ruled in the 1840s.

In 1714, Chu oversaw another series of major expansions and construction projects, the largest expansion phase in the pagoda's history. The main set of triple gates were erected, in addition to different shrines to the heavenly realms, the Ngọc Hoàng, the Thập Điện Diêm Vương (Chữ Hán: 十殿閻羅), halls for preaching dharma, towers for storing sutras, bell towers, drum towers, meditation halls and halls to venerate Avalokiteśvara and the Medicine Buddha and living quarters for the sangha.

Chu also organised for the staging of the vassana retreat which occurs annually between the full moon of the fourth and the seventh lunar month. The tradition had been inaugurated in the time of Gautama Buddha in ancient India to coincide in the rainy season. During this time, monks would stay in one place and pursue their spiritual activities, rather than wandering around and expounding the dharma to the populace, since they were prone to step on living beings during this time due to the water covering their paths. He also organised an expedition to China to bring back copies of the Tripiṭaka canon and the Mahayana sutras, which comprised more than one thousand volumes, and interred them in the pagoda.

During the 19th century, the temple was patronised by the emperors of the Nguyễn dynasty, which was founded in 1802 by Emperor Gia Long after his unification of modern Vietnam. His successor Minh Mạng funded further expansion and renovation of the temple.

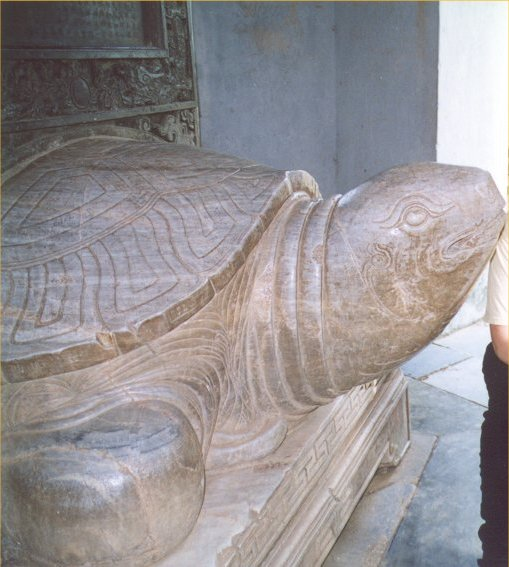
The stone turtle with a stele on its back

Emperor Thiệu Trị, who succeeded Minh Mạng, erected the Từ Nhân Pagoda in 1844, which is now known as the Phước Duyên Pagoda. The brick pagoda stands 21 m and is of octagonal shape and has seven stories, each of which is dedicated to a different Buddha. The pagoda has stood there since, overlooking the Perfume River, and has become synonymous with the landscape of Huế and the Perfume River. Its impact is such that it has become the unofficial symbol of the city.

The temple also contains a statue of a large marble turtle, a symbol of longevity. Beside the tower on either side are structures that record the architectural history of the tower, as well as various poems composed by Thiệu Trị.

The temple and its buildings were severely damaged in a cyclone in 1904. Emperor Thành Thái authorised reconstructions in 1907 and it has continued to the current day, although it was still substantially less grand and expansive as its halcyon days of the Nguyễn dynasty before the storm. Today, a tourist facility is also present among the gardens and grounds of the temple, and a stupa has been erected in honour of Hòa Thượng Thích Ðôn Hậu, the abbot of the temple during its reconstruction phase in the 20th century. His holy body is entombed in the stupa, which is a garden of pine trees.

In the main hall, there is a statue of Maitreya, flanked by Bồ Tát Văn Thù Sư Lợi (Manjushri Bodhisattva) and Bồ Tát Phổ Hiền (Samantabhadra Bodhisattva).

During the summer of 1963, Thiên Mụ Temple, like many in South Vietnam, became a hotbed of anti-government protest. South Vietnam's Buddhist majority had long been discontented with the rule of President Ngo Dinh Diem since his rise to power in 1955. Diem had shown strong favouritism towards Catholics and discrimination against Buddhists in the army, public service and distribution of government aid. In the countryside, Catholics were de facto exempt from performing corvée labour and in some rural areas, Catholic priests led private armies against Buddhist villages. Discontent with Diem exploded into mass protest in Huế during the summer of 1963 when nine Buddhists died at the hand of Diệm's army and police on Vesak, the birthday of Gautama Buddha. In May 1963, a law against the flying of religious flags was selectively invoked; the Buddhist flag was banned from display on Vesak while the Vatican flag was displayed to celebrate the anniversary of the consecration of Archbishop Ngô Đình Thục, Diem's brother. The Buddhists defied the ban and a protest that began with a march starting from Từ Đàm Temple to the government broadcasting station was ended when government forces opened fire. As a result, Buddhist protests were held across the country and steadily grew in size, asking for the signing of a Joint Communiqué to end religious inequality. Thien Mu Pagoda was a major organising point for the Buddhist movement and was often the location of hunger strikes, barricades and protests.

In the early 1980s, a person was murdered near the pagoda and the site became the focal point of anti-communist protests, closing traffic around the Phú Xuân Bridge. The communist government responded by arresting monks on the charge of disturbing traffic flow and public order.

The temple also houses the Austin motor vehicle in which Thích Quảng Đức was driven to his self-immolation in Saigon in 1963 against the Diem regime. It was the first of a series of self-immolations by members of the Buddhist clergy, which brought the plight of Buddhists to the attention of the international community.

== Gallery ==
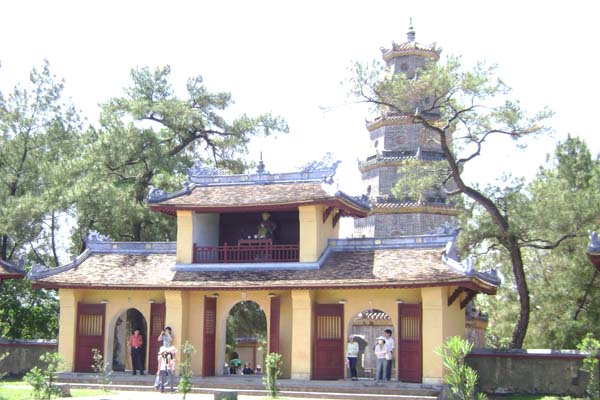
The gate of Thiên Mụ Pagoda and Phước duyên Tower is seen from the inside.

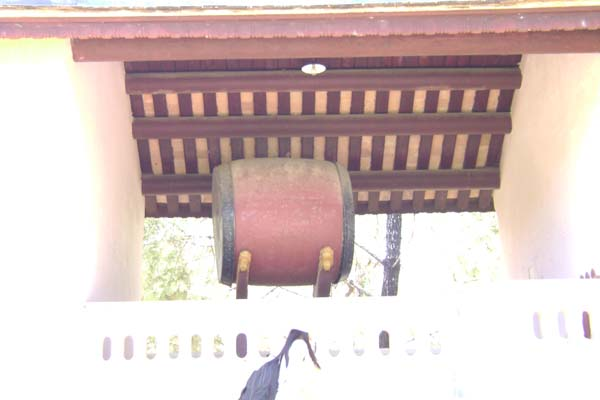
Monolithic jackfruit wood drum in Thiên Mụ Pagoda.

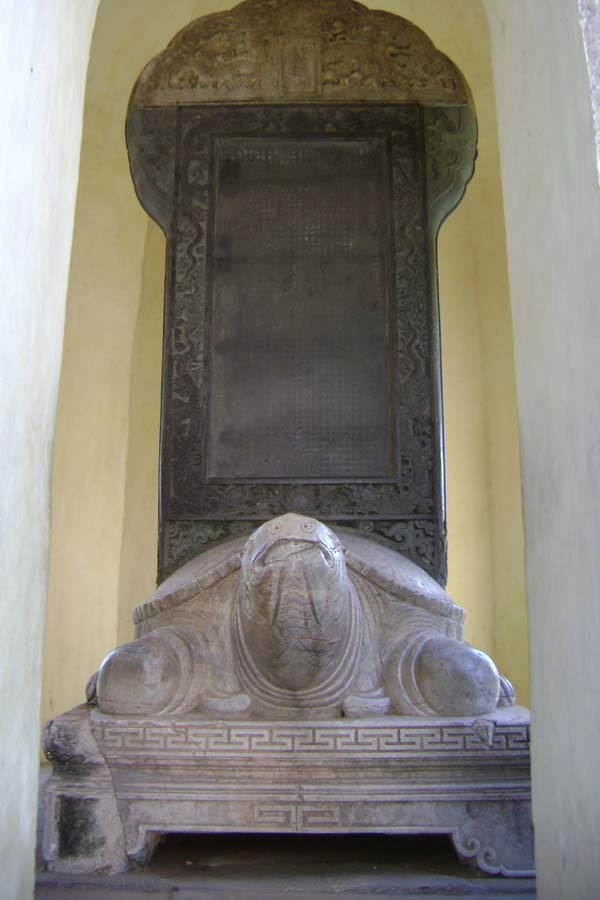
The stone stele talks about Phước Duyên tower in Thiên Mụ pagoda.

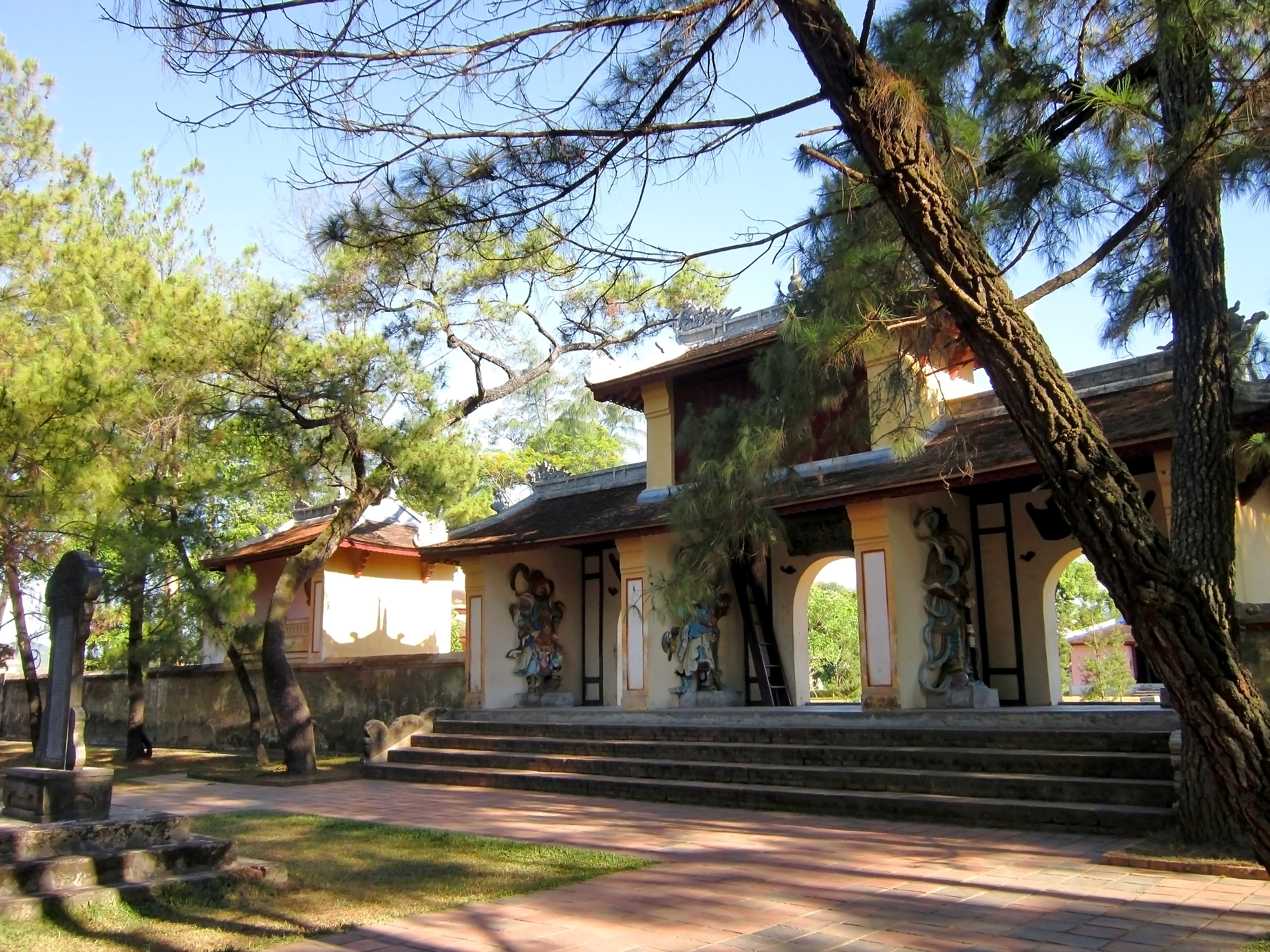
Three tours of Thiên Mụ Pagoda.

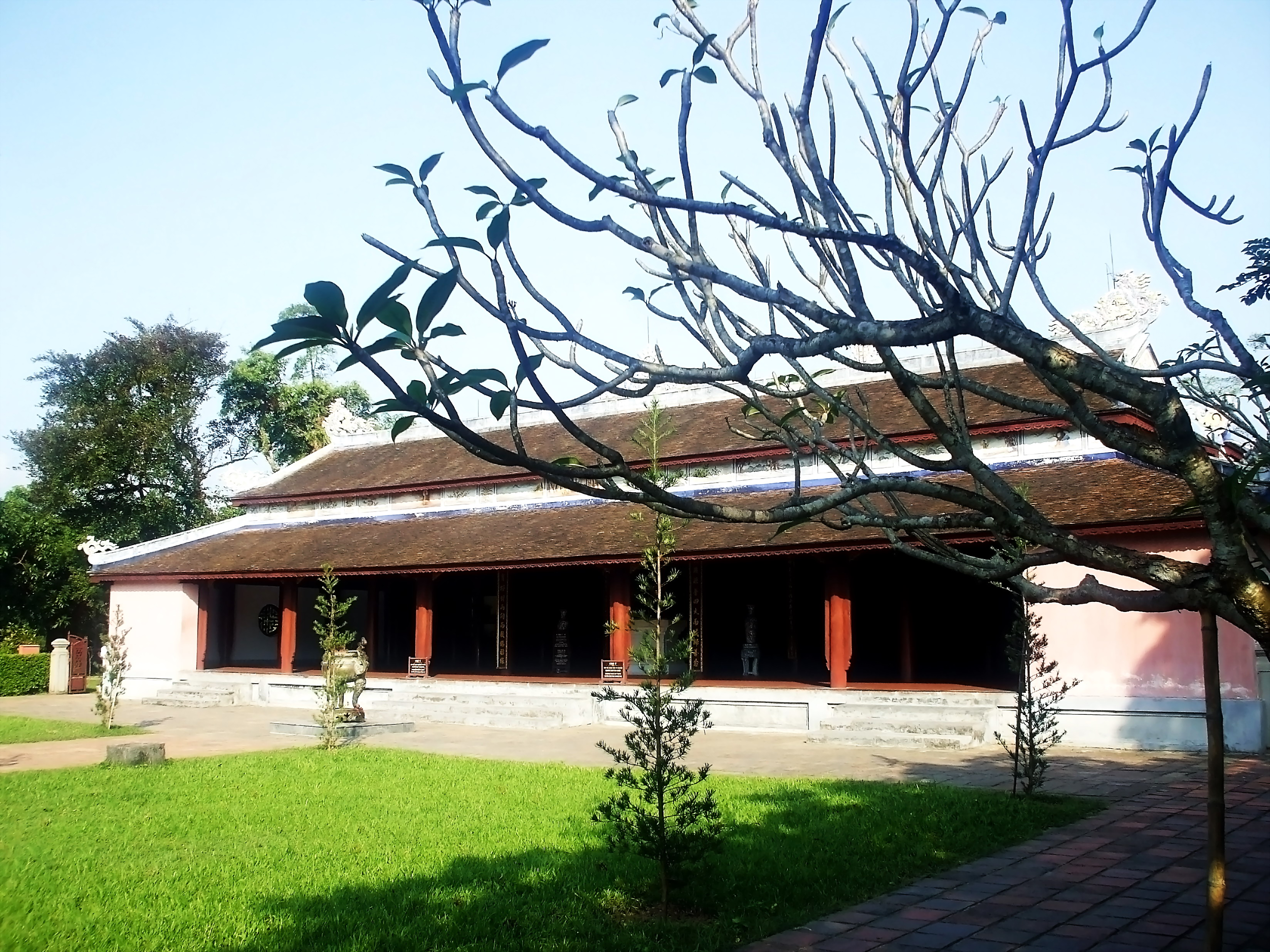
The main hall of Thiên Mụ Pagoda.

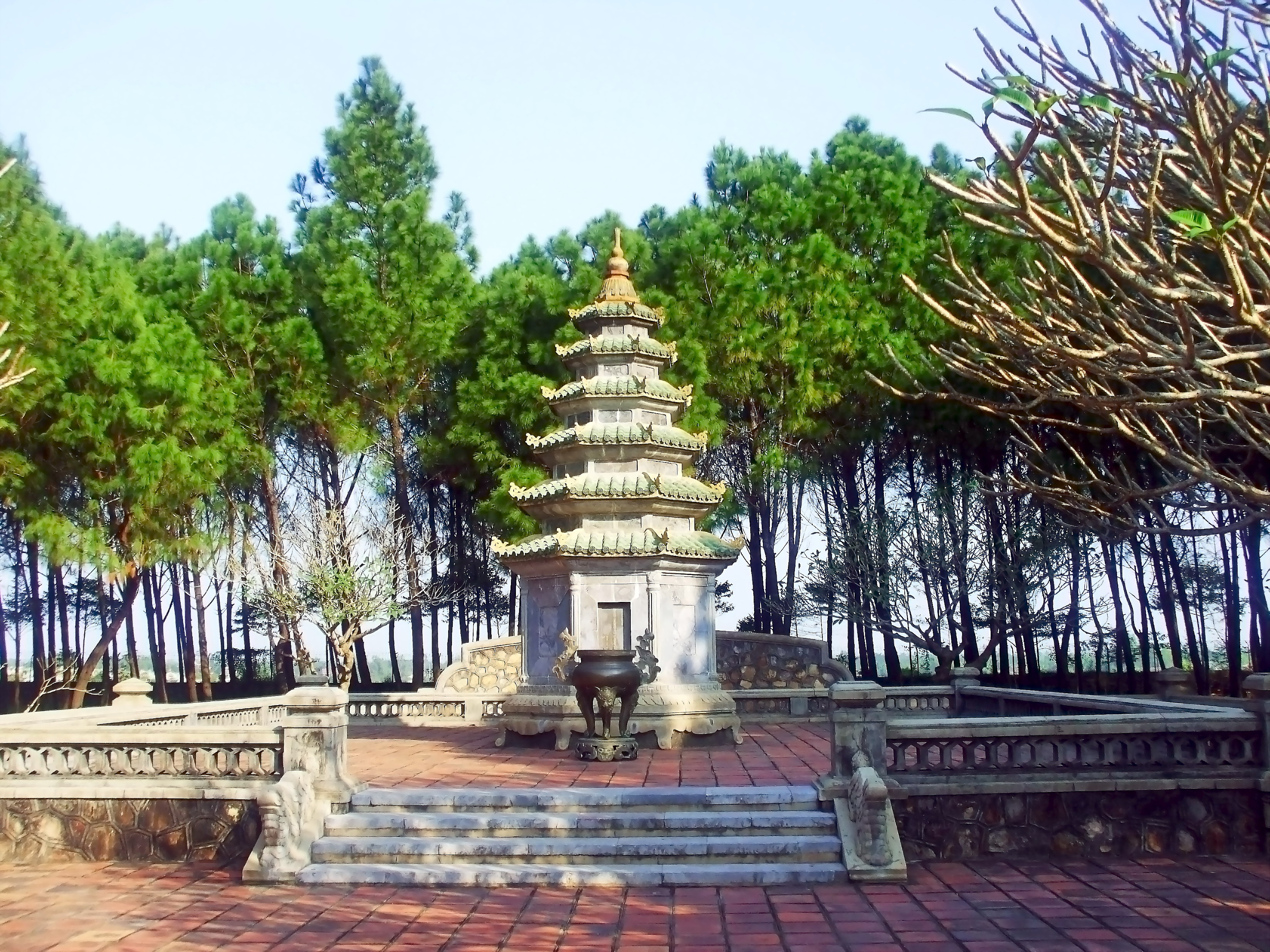
Tower tomb of the late Venerable Thích Đôn Hậu.

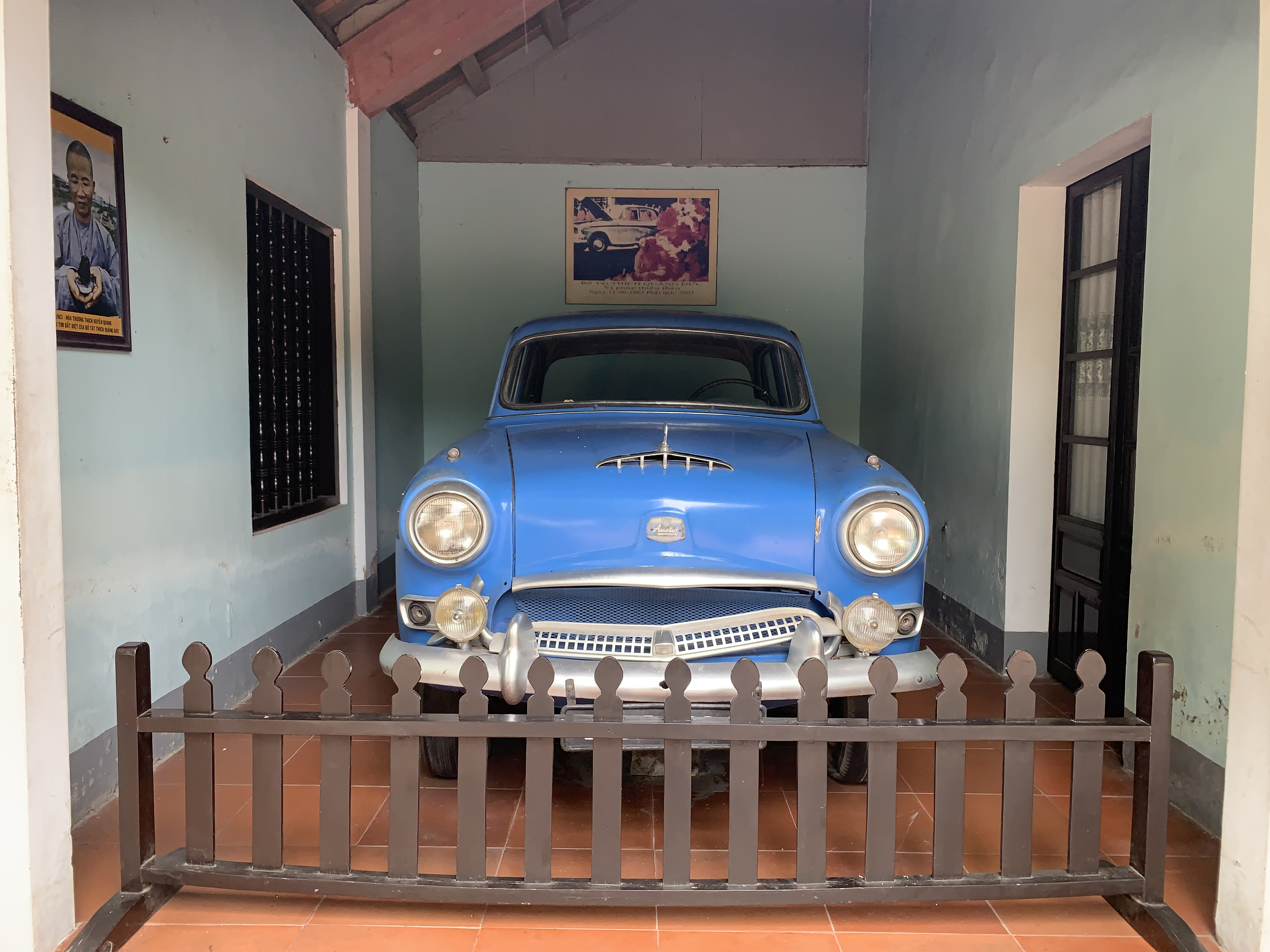
The "relic" car which Monk Thích Quảng Đức rode to self-immolate in Saigon

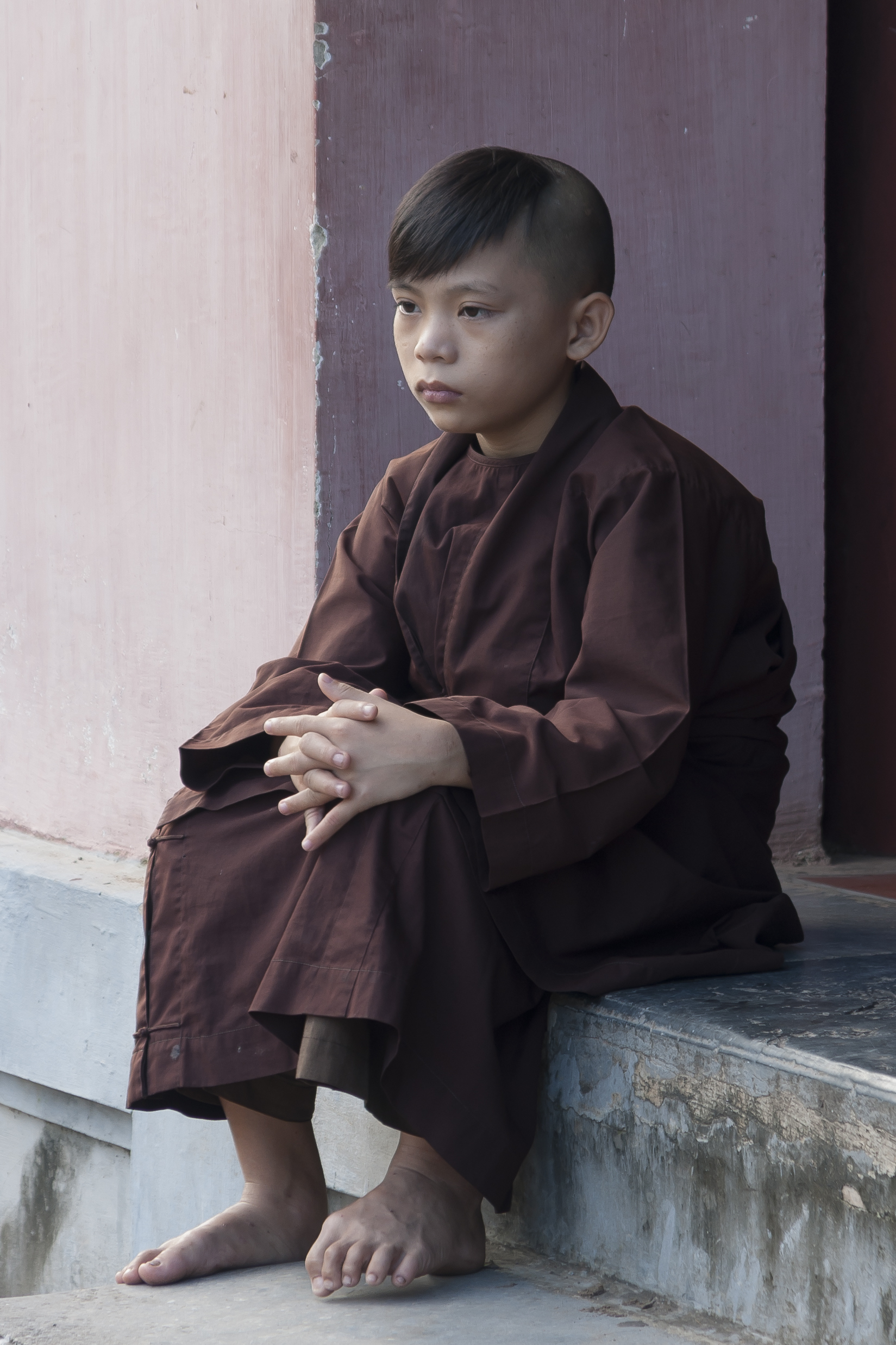
A novice monk at Thiên Mụ Pagoda

== Bibliography ==
- Jacobs, Seth (2006). Cold War Mandarin: Ngo Dinh Diem and the Origins of America's War in Vietnam, 1950–1963. Rowman & Littlefield. ISBN 0-7425-4447-8.
- Jones, Howard (2003). Death of a Generation. Oxford University Press. ISBN 0-19-505286-2.
