= A Lưới =

A Lưới is a place name in Huế city, Vietnam. A Lưới was formerly the name of a district in Thừa Thiên Huế province, then Huế city until it was dissolved in July 1st, 2025. Currently, A Lưới is the name given to five communes in Huế city, numbered from 1 to 5:

- A Lưới 1 commune, Huế city
- A Lưới 2 commune, Huế city
- A Lưới 3 commune, Huế city
- A Lưới 4 commune, Huế city
- A Lưới 5 commune, Huế city
