= Ministry of Education (Nguyễn dynasty) =

Vietnamese government ministry (1907–1945)

Ministry of (National) Education (1907–1945) Ministry of Education and Fine Arts (1945)
- Học Bộ (學部) (1907–1933); Bộ Quốc-dân Giáo-dục (部國民教育) (Note: In Classical Chinese the ministry was called the Quốc dân Giáo dục Bộ (國民教育部).) (Note: The ministry during this period is often mistakenly referred to as the Bộ Quốc-gia Giáo-dục (部國家教育) by modern historians, see the explanation below.) (1933–1945); Giáo-dục Mỹ-thuật Bộ (教育美術部) (1945)
- Học Bộ chi ấn (學部之印)

- Giáo dục Bộ ấn (教育部印)

- Giáo dục Mỹ thuật (教育美術)

Agency overview
- Formed: 09-09-Duy Tân 1 (1907)
- Preceding agency: Ministry of Rites and Labour (Lễ Bộ)
- Dissolved: 23 August 1945
- Superseding agency: Ministry of National Education of the Democratic Republic of Vietnam
- Type: Cabinet-level ministry of the government of the Southern dynasty
- Jurisdiction: Nguyễn dynasty
- Headquarters: Trụ sở trường Tôn Học, Huế
- Agency executive: Thượng thư (尚書), 1907–1945; Bộ trưởng (部長), 1945
- Parent agency: Nội các (1907–1934); Ngự tiền văn phòng (1934–1945)
- Child agencies: Quốc sử quán; Quốc tử giám; Institute of Mechanics (Note: In Vietnamese it is known as the Cơ học Viện (剞學院) and in French as the Institut de Mécanique.); Department of Youth and Sports

During the Nguyễn dynasty period (1802–1945) of Vietnamese history its Ministry of Education was reformed a number of times, in its first iteration it was called the Học Bộ (chữ Hán: 學部; (Note: In Vernacular Vietnamese it's called the Bộ Học (Chữ Nôm: 部學).) French: Ministère de l'Instruction publique) which was established during the reign of the Duy Tân Emperor (1907–1916) and took over a number of functions of the Lễ Bộ, one of the Lục Bộ. The Governor-General of French Indochina wished to introduce more education reforms, the Nguyễn court in Huế sent Cao Xuân Dục and Huỳnh Côn, the Thượng thư of the Hộ Bộ, to French Cochinchina to discuss these reforms with the French authorities. After their return the Học Bộ was established in the year Duy Tân 1 (1907) with Cao Xuân Dục being appointed to be its first Thượng thư (minister). Despite nominally being a Nguyễn dynasty institution, actual control over the ministry fell in the hands of the French Council for the Improvement of Indigenous Education in Annam.

The Học Bộ also included a number of agencies like the Quốc sử quán (國史館), the official state history office. And the Quốc tử giám (國子監), the national academy.

During this period the country saw a transition of the traditional Confucian-based system of imperial examinations to the multi-field and specialised educational system that was being used in the West. Educational reformers who were educated in France rose to prominent positions and reformed the Nguyễn dynasty's education system from within.

In the year Bảo Đại 8 (1933) the Học Bộ was reformed into the more French-style Ministry of National Education (Vietnamese: Bộ Quốc dân Giáo dục; Hán-Nôm: 部國民教育; French: Ministère de l'Éducation nationale). The Bảo Đại Emperor wanted to remove the old ministers who were solely educated in Confucianism and replace them with well-known academics and officials calling for Westernising reforms. The first Thượng thư of the Ministry of National Education was Phạm Quỳnh, the editor-in-chief of the Nam Phong magazine.

In the year Bảo Đại 17 (1942) the Ministry of National Education would also become responsible for the organising youth activities and sports events with the creation of the Department of Youth and Sports. Expanding the scope of the Ministry and its duties.

During the Trần Trọng Kim cabinet of the Empire of Vietnam it was renamed the Ministry of Education and Fine Arts (Vietnamese: Bộ Giáo dục và Mỹ thuật; Hán-Nôm: 部教育𡝕美術) (Note: Sometimes referred to as the Bộ Giáo dục và Mỹ nghệ.) and was headed by minister Hoàng Xuân Hãn. The Empire of Vietnam's Ministry of Education and Fine Arts would launch a national Vietnamese-language curriculum and try to Vietnamise the country's education system at every level to reduce the influence of the French language on Vietnam's education system. It was abolished during the August Revolution when the Indochinese Communist Party staged a nationwide revolution that ended the 143-year reign of the Nguyễn dynasty over Vietnam. On 28 August 1945 the Democratic Republic of Vietnam would set up its own Ministry of National Education taking over the functions in Vietnamese society of the old imperial institution. The reforms introduced in 1945 proved successful and would influence the education systems of Vietnam long after the fall of the Nguyễn dynasty.

== History ==
=== Background ===
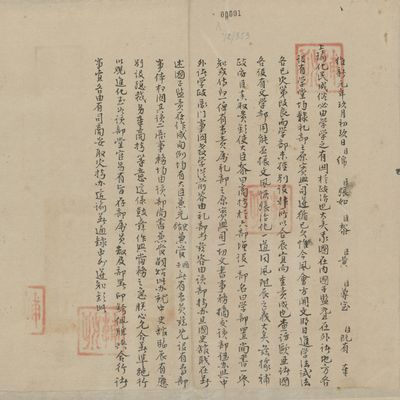
Decree (諭, Dụ) establishing the Học Bộ (Duy Tân 1).

After ascending to the throne the Gia Long Emperor adopted the organisational structure of the Revival Lê dynasty's government. From 1802 until 1906 the ministries of the government of the Nguyễn dynasty consisted of the Ministry of Personnel (吏部, Lại Bộ), Ministry of Revenue (戶部, Hộ Bộ), Ministry of Rites (禮部, Lễ Bộ), Ministry of War (兵部, Binh Bộ), Ministry of Justice (刑部, Hình Bộ), and the Ministry of Public Works (工部, Công Bộ), these were known together as the Lục Bộ (六部). During the reign of the Duy Tân Emperor, the operation of the Lục Bộ was gradually changed; the number of ministries and names of some of them changed. Furthermore, the mode of operation of the ministries would also change.

The Ministry of Rites was responsible for the rituals, culture, and education of the court. It was the Ministry of Rites that organised the Confucian Hương exams and the Hội exams, and to organise the ceremony to announce the names of those who passed the examination and would become tiến sĩ (進士). The head of the education related tasks of the Ministry of Rites was the Ty Tân hưng.

Following the French conquest of Vietnam and the establishment of French Indochina the French would introduce a lot of reforms to the Vietnamese education system. During the French period the Confucian-oriented education system was slowly being replaced with a localised version of the French education system. Prior to French domination teachers were held in high regard in the Confucian system and as such one of the traditional values of the Vietnamese people is the promotion of learning and to have high respect for educators. In this old system teachers were deemed to be "Only lower than the King" (Emperor) according to a 2010 report by the World Bank. The Confucian education system is mainly based on the Four Books and Five Classics, which leads to people only studying literature and scriptures to become a mandarin rather than any practical courses related to administration.

The goals of the French "mission civilisatrice" (civilising mission) were to share the ideals of an egalitarian society and educate the indigenous populations of the French colonies through progress provided to them by education, culture, and science. This model saw the culture produced by French civilisation as "unique, universal, and superior". If the native population advanced to a certain level of civilisation they would be able to reach the French republican values of Liberté, égalité, fraternité (liberty, equality, and fraternity). However, in practice the French colonial educational and medical systems were primarily intended for the French colonists and a handful of indigenous elites residing in the main cities. In reality the vast majority of the indigenous populations of the Nguyễn dynasty would continue to be educated in Confucian village schools and a small number of some Catholic parish schools and seminaries.

In 1898 Governor-General of French Indochina Paul Doumer decreed that the Thi Hương (試鄉) examination department of the Nam Định province should open an additional French exam. By 1905 the Annamese and Tonkinese education systems were still heavily focused on Confucianism, but had already added a number of subjects like French, Chữ quốc ngữ, and mathematics. By this time two French-Annamese schools (Trường Pháp Việt) existed in Huế, namely the Trường tiểu học Pháp-Việt Đông Ba and the Quốc Học. The Quốc Học was established for the children of mandarins and the imperial family, in if students would study French, vernacular Vietnamese, and Classical Chinese simultaneously for 6 years.

On 16 May 1906 the Governor-General of French Indochina Jean Baptiste Paul Beau issued a decree establishing the "Council for the Improvement of Indigenous Education in Annam" (French: Conseil de Perfectionnement de l’Enseignement indigène en Annam; Vietnamese: Hội đồng Hoàn thiện giáo dục Bản xứ Trung Kỳ; Hán-Nôm: 會同完善教育本處中圻). This organisation would oversee the French policies surrounding the education of the indigenous population of the French protectorate of Annam. It was established alongside similar French Indochinese councils for indigenous educations for Cambodia, Cochinchina, Tonkin, and Laos to "study educational issues related to each place separately."; On 30 October 1906, France issued a decree on "establishing a French-Vietnamese educational programme in Annam". These organisations would all fall under the federal Direction de l’Instruction Publique de l’Indochine (Nha Học Chính Đông Pháp).

According to researcher Nguyễn Đắc Xuân, in 1907, the imperial court of the Nguyễn dynasty sent Cao Xuân Dục and Huỳnh Côn, the Thượng thư of the Hộ Bộ, to French Cochinchina to "hold a conference on education" (bàn nghị học chính) with the French authorities on the future of the Annamese education system. This meeting was also recorded in the work Hoàng Việt Giáp Tý niên biểu written by Nguyễn Bá Trác. The creation of a ministry of education was orchestrated by the French to reform the Nguyễn dynasty's educational system to match French ambitions in the region more.

On the 9th day of the 9th month of the 1st year of the reign of the Duy Tân Emperor the Học Bộ was established by imperial decree (諭, Dụ) to take over the functions relating to education from the Ministry of Rites.

=== Học Bộ ===
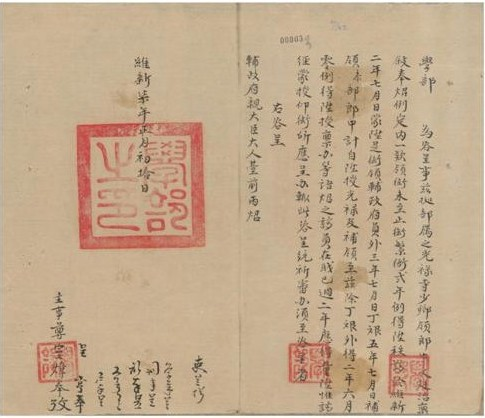
A letter from the Học Bộ asking for a promotion for its staff (Duy Tân 7 - 1913).

The Encyclopedic Dictionary of Vietnam explains that the ministry the Nguyễn court established the Học Bộ by splitting off all education related tasks from the Ministry of Rites. The organisation of both examinations in the capital and the provinces was to be provided by the Học Bộ. The Quốc sử quán (國史館) and the Quốc tử giám (國子監) agencies of the Ministry of Rites were also transferred to the Học Bộ.

Since the Thành Thái period, new innovative ways of learning have been imported from abroad and a large number of new schools were established in the territory of the Nguyễn dynasty. When the Ministry of Education was established, all the examinations, schools, student selection processes, and educational institutions of the Southern dynasty changed. While in the past only Confucianism was seen as vital for the learning process, and to study one had to know Confucian script (𡨸儒, Chữ Nho), study ancient texts, ancient poems, learn about ancient regimes, expressions, and read ancient books, during the Thành Thái period a large number of newer ways of learning entered the country. By the time that the Học Bộ was created these newer ways of learning had to be integrated into the institution education system of the country. As explained by the Resident-Superior of Annam Ernest Fernand Lévecque "Its creation is to better suit the times as more opportunities to study" opened up in the South to which this new ministry was best suited to help this transition.

The headquarters of the Học Bộ were located in the old headquarters of the old the trường Tôn Học.

In terms of organisational structure, the Học Bộ, like other ministries, was headed by a Thượng thư and below him a Tham Tri (or Thị lang / 侍郎, Vice Minister). Further subordinate offices included the Viên ngoại lang, Lang trung, Chủ sự, and Tư vụ. Compared to the Lục Bộ established under Gia Long the Học Bộ had less administrators to fulfill its duties. These officials are all issued Bài (plaques) with their positions on them and the Thượng thư and Tham tri were both given quan phòng (關防) type seals.

The first Thượng thư of the Học Bộ was selected to be Cao Xuân Dục. Before being appointed to the position of Minister of Education, Cao Xuân Dục had held many official positions in the government of the Nguyễn dynasty after passing the exam to become a cử nhân (舉人) in 1876.

According to a document made on 09-01-Duy Tân 2 it was reported that the Học Bộ didn't have its own seals yet, so the Ministry of Education, Cao Xuan Duc, asked for a quan phòng seal for his office, 1 quan phòng seal for the Tham tri. The ministry considers that the documents presented are in compliance with the implementation rules. The seals were made by the Hữu ty and were made of bronze. The Bộ ấn (部印) had the inscription Học Bộ chi ấn (學部之印) in seal script and was 9,0 cm x 9,0 cm. Meanwhile, the kiềm ấn had the inscription Học Bộ (學部) in script and was 2,7 cm x 2,7. The big seal was used to stamp the date while the smaller seal was used to close in important positions and erasing characters, among other tasks.

While the Học Bộ was nominally a part of the Nguyễn dynasty's administrative apparatus, actual control was in the hands of the French Council for the Improvement of Indigenous Education in Annam, which dictated its policies. All work done by the ministry was according to the plans and the command of the French Director of Education of Annam (監督學政中圻, Giám đốc Học chính Trung Kỳ). The French administration in Annam continuously revised the curriculum to be taught in order to fit the French system.

Governor-General of French Indochina Jean Baptiste Paul Beau's reforms to the education systems of Annam and Tonkin did not abolish the imperial examination system, it simply added the added more French subjects to the existing framework. It wasn't until the reforms of Governor-General of French Indochina Albert Sarraut's reforms that introduced a new education system that trained multi-skilled, multi-field civil servants. During this period, France set up a school service throughout French Indochina where the education was provided by a Service de L’Enseignement Local (Sở Giáo Dục Cho Người Bản Xứ) headed by a Chef de Service (Chánh Sở). These educational institutions were all directly below the Resident-Superior of Annam. All appointments, transfers, promotions, and disciplining of teachers was done under the direction of the Resident-Superior.

The last Confucian imperial examinations were held in 1919, after which only the method of selecting officials used in France was used by the government of the Southern dynasty.

Initially the French wanted to institute a programme of assimilation, but this was quickly abandoned and replaced with a new policy in favour of "association" rather than assimilation where the French would respect the local culture. The association programme was only intended for a small number of elites that had attended Franco-Indigenous schools and enjoyed a modern French education. The people educated in these Franco-Indigenous schools would become what was termed the "new collaborators" and they would help perpetuate the idea of a shared "Franco-Annamite community" of a more Westernised indigenous people.

In 1922 Thân Trọng Huề was appointed to the position of Thượng thư Bộ Học. Thân Trọng Huề was one of the first three people from the realm of the Nguyễn dynasty after the protectorates were established sent to Francs to study at a special school for colonial subjects alongside Hoàng Trọng Phu and Lê Văn Miến. Thân Trọng Huề had previously been a vocal supporter of replacing the Confucian court examination system with a Western-style examination system like they had in France.

"One side is constantly returning to the past, silently opposing reforms of Western origin; The other side is based on the past but looks forward to and prepares for the changes of the country."

(Original Vietnamese)

"Một bên thì không ngừng quay về với quá khứ, âm thầm chống đối những cải cách có nguồn gốc phương Tây; một bên dựa trên quá khứ nhưng lại hướng về và chuẩn bị cho những đổi thay cuả đất nước."

— "Thân Trọng Huề with the policy of reforming education and justice systems" (Thân Trọng Huề với chủ trương cải cách giáo dục và tư pháp) by Thanh Tùng (9 December 2020) - Hội Nghiên cứu và phát triển di sản văn hóa Huế (Huế Cultural Heritage Research and Development Association - Huế Học).

Thân Trọng Huề wanted to reform the education system to teach scientific learning in primary, secondary, and tertiary schools so "the light of civilisation will penetrate the villages" and hoped that the entire population would become literate. Thân Trọng Huề had first worked for 15 years in the French protectorate of Tonkin before joining the Southern Court in Huế where he hoped to promote reformers in the executive branch of the government and to "rectify the bureaucracy" (Chấn chỉnh quan trường).

During his time in office, Thân Trọng Huề fought corruption as he argued that mandarins should be exemplary in their duties as mandarins are seen as "the parents of the people" (父母之民, phụ mẫu chi dân) in Nguyễn dynasty society.

Prior to 1932 the funding of schools in rural villages (communal and inter-communal schools) were funded through "competitive funds", which were a kind of provincial common fund financed through special taxes imposed on the villages, and were managed in a centralised manner at the capital of the province. Starting in 1932 the Học Bộ changed its policy to make the financing of these schools the responsibility of the villages themselves. However, the decentralisation policy proved to be unsuccessful as the freedom left to the villages for the maintenance of these schools and the payment of the teachers risked compromising the development of communal education, the teachers ended up often being underpaid compared to earlier and an investigation by the Học Bộ revealed numerous abuses in this area.

=== Ministry of National Education ===
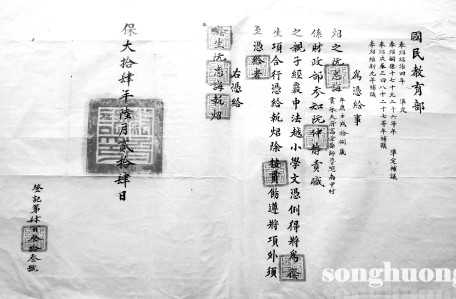
A Franco-Vietnamese primary school diploma (法越小學文憑, Pháp-Việt Tiểu-Học Văn-bằng) issued by the Ministry of National Education in Classical Chinese (14-06-Bảo Đại 14 - 1939).

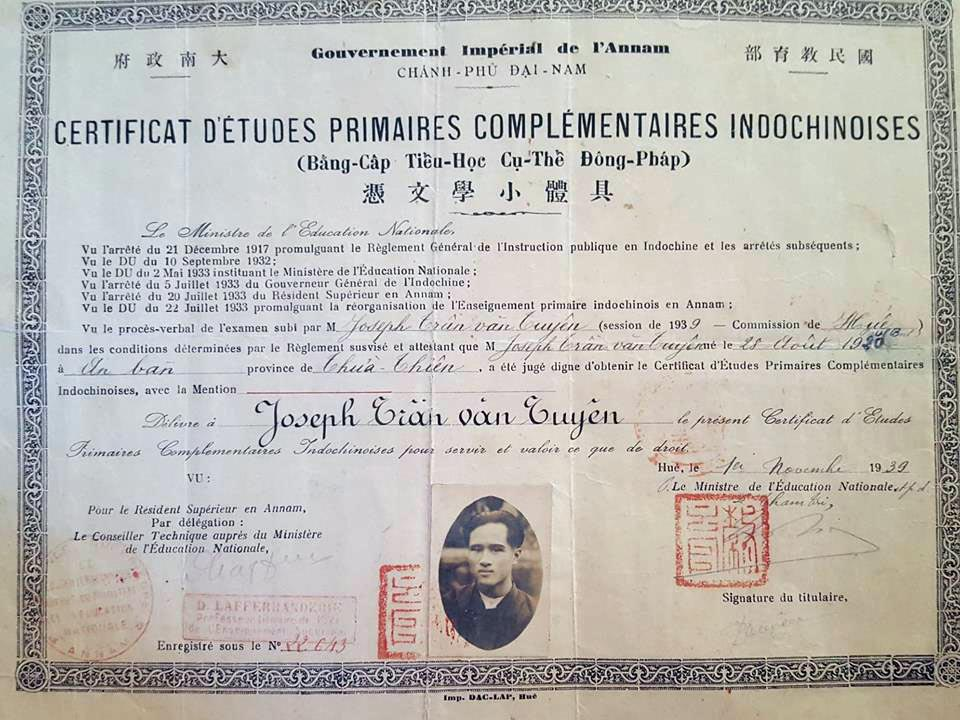
A French Indochinese primary school diploma (憑給小學具體東法, Bằng-cấp Tiểu-Học Cụ-thề Đông-Pháp) (Note: The Classical Chinese name of the diploma reads "具體小學文憑" (Cụ-thề Tiểu-Học Văn-bằng) written from right-to-left.) issued by the Ministry of National Education in French (1939).

In 1933 the Bảo Đại Emperor issued a series of reforms, among them he reformed the affairs of the court, such as rearranging internal affairs and administration. He also gave up a number of customs that the previous Nguyễn dynasty Emperors had set forth such that subjects now did no longer have to bow down and could look up at the Emperor whenever he went somewhere and instituted that mandarins would have to shake hands with the Emperor instead of bowing down.

Among these reforms was an imperial edict signed on 8 April 1933 that reshuffled the cabinet, as the Bảo Đại Emperor decided to govern himself and ordained five new well-known ministers from the academic and administrative circles. He retired Nguyễn Hữu Bài of the Ministry of Personnel (Bộ Lại), Tôn Thất Đàn of the Ministry of Justice (Bộ Hình), Phạm Liệu of the Ministry of War (Bộ Binh), Võ Liêm of the Ministry of Rites (Bộ Lễ), Vương Tứ Đại of the Ministry of Public Works (Bộ Công). The Học Bộ became the Ministry of National Education (Bộ Quốc gia Giáo dục) which existed alongside the Ministry of Personnel (Bộ Lại), the Ministry of Ceremonies and Fine Arts (Bộ Lễ nghi - Mỹ thuật), Ministry of Finance and Social Relief (Bộ Tài chính và Cứu tế Xã hội), Ministry of Justice (Bộ Tư pháp), and the Ministry of Public Works (Bộ Công chính).

The Bảo Đại Emperor officially signed an imperial decree (dụ) on 2 May 1933 establishing the Ministry of National Education.

The roles and responsibilities of the Ministry of National Education during its establishment include:

- 1° - Ministerial decrees and instructions (Nghi-dinh and Thông-tu) concerning the organisation and functioning of the Ministry of National Education and for the use of its staff within the limits of the roles and responsibilities of the ministry with the collaboration of the French advisor with the consent of the Resident-Superior of Annam.
- 2° - Study and draft its budget together with the Ministry of Finance and Social Relief and in collaboration with the French advisors, then present the budget to the Viện cơ mật for discussion.
- 3° - Assessment and application of new regulations of the Franco-Indigenous primary education and indigenous primary education to fit the needs of the country with the advice of the French technical advisor to the Ministry of National Education. Organisation of supervision of the primary education in Annam. Assessment of personnel and material requirements of the educators within the protectorate and how they should be incorporated into the new educational organisation. Set up terms and conditions for both the educational staff employed by the imperial government of the Nguyễn dynasty and the government of the protectorate concerning, finances, salaries, grades, and attributions, in collaboration with the French Technical Adviser. These proposals are subject to discussion and the review of the Viện cơ mật, after approval by the Resident-Superior of Annam, and by official decision of the Emperor.
- 4° - Authorise the establishment of a private or village school, supervise these schools, provide instructions after approval by the French technical advisor to the Ministry of National Education and the Resident-Superior of Annam.
- 5° - Give authorisation to establish after-school courses, their supervision, after approval by the French technical advisor to the Ministry of National Education and the Resident-Superior of Annam.
- 6° - All studies and proposals relating to education in general and to national educational works with the collaboration of the French Technical Advisor (societies, circles, groups, libraries, etc.).
- 7° - Control of the Quốc tử giám, Quốc sử quán, and the Cơ học Viện.
- 8° - Control of archives and libraries.
- 9° - Project the creation of an Annamese Academy (Académie annamite).
- 10° - Authorise the creation of sports societies and their supervision, after the agreement of the Resident-Superior of Annam.
- 11° - Appointments, promotions, transfers, sanctions, retirements, up to the grade of 6-2 excluded, after agreement by the Resident-Superior of Annam. Propositions have to be made to the Emperor, with a consultation of the Viện cơ mật, and the approval of the Resident-Superior of Annam for other appointments, promotions, transfers, sanctions, and retirements.
- 12° - Granting of honorary grades, after approval by the Resident-Superior of Annam, below the grade of 5-2 including the titles of the ministry. Propositions have to be made to the Emperor, with a consultation of the Viện cơ mật, and the approval of the Resident-Superior of Annam for other nominations.
- 13° - Propose to the Emperor the issuance of honorary distinctions for personnel under the Ministry, after approval by the Resident-Superior of Annam.
- 14° - The Ministry of National Education is also charged, after the agreement of the Resident-Superior of Annam and with the collaboration of the French Technical Adviser to this Ministry, with the control of examinations, the development of programmes, the preparation of textbooks, and the inspection of schools. Under these same conditions, this department will be called upon to give directives to indigenous elementary and primary education.
- 15° - The issuance of « Am-sanh » certificates according to the regulations in force.

The first head (Thượng thư) of the new Ministry of National Education was Phạm Quỳnh. When the Học Bộ became the Ministry of National Education the former Governor-General of French Indochina Jean-François dit Eugène Charles was presided over the founding ceremony on 7 August 1933 in Huế.

In his memoirs Le Dragon d’Annam Bảo Đại wrote: “In order to rejuvenate the mandarin apparatus and promote new people, it was Charles who suggested that I replace Mr. [Nguyễn Hữu] Bài with Phạm Quỳnh. I sent this man over and told him my intention to reform the country with young people. Phạm Quỳnh is from the North, self-taught, a writer, and a journalist, he's only 35 years old. Very honest, he presented a position that resonated with me very well. I immediately appointed him to the position of Đổng lý of the Ngự tiền văn phòng and the rank of Thượng thư. It was the first time that a person who had never had been an official was appointed Thượng thư at the Huế court." Phạm Quỳnh was installed by Dụ số 29 and despite what the Bảo Đại Emperor wrote in his memoirs he was actually 39 years old at the time of his appointment as the Minister of National Education.

Phạm Quỳnh's family attempted to convince the French administration to concede to the government of the Southern dynasty the right to manage primary schools within its territory, to which the Ministry of National Education was given the rights to manage primary education within the territory of Trung Kỳ (Annam) under the oversight of the French Resident-Superior.

The school system in French Indochina had 3 levels with a 13-year curriculum. Primary schools (小學, Tiểu Học) had a 6-year curriculum. After completing primary school attendees received a certificate entitled the Certificat d’Études Primaire Franco-Indigène (CEPFI). Students were required to be in possession of this certificate to be admitted to universities. The next level of the Tiểu Học was the Bậc Cao Đẳng Tiểu Học, which were known in French as a Collège, and had 4-year long programme. After completing 4 years of study students received a Diplôme d’Étude Primaire Supérieurs Franco-Indigène (Bằng Cao Đẳng Tiểu Học) which were required to go into secondary education.

In 1933 the Ministry of National Education re-centralised the budgets of rural schools in Annam to get the necessary funds for the payment of communal teachers and the maintenance of communal schools after an earlier attempt at decentralisation proved disastrous.

During the period of 12 May 1942 to 19 March 1945 the Minister of National Education was Trần Thanh Đạt, also known as Trần Công Toại.

In 1942 the Bảo Đại Emperor signed the 147th edict on 28 December 1942 (Dụ số 147 ngày 28/12/1942) establishing the Department of Youth and Sports (Nha Thanh niên và Thể thao) of the government of the Southern dynasty. The Department of Youth and Sports was responsible for the physical education, sports, and achievements of the country's youth and fell under the administration of the Ministry of National Education.

=== Ministry of Education and Fine Arts ===
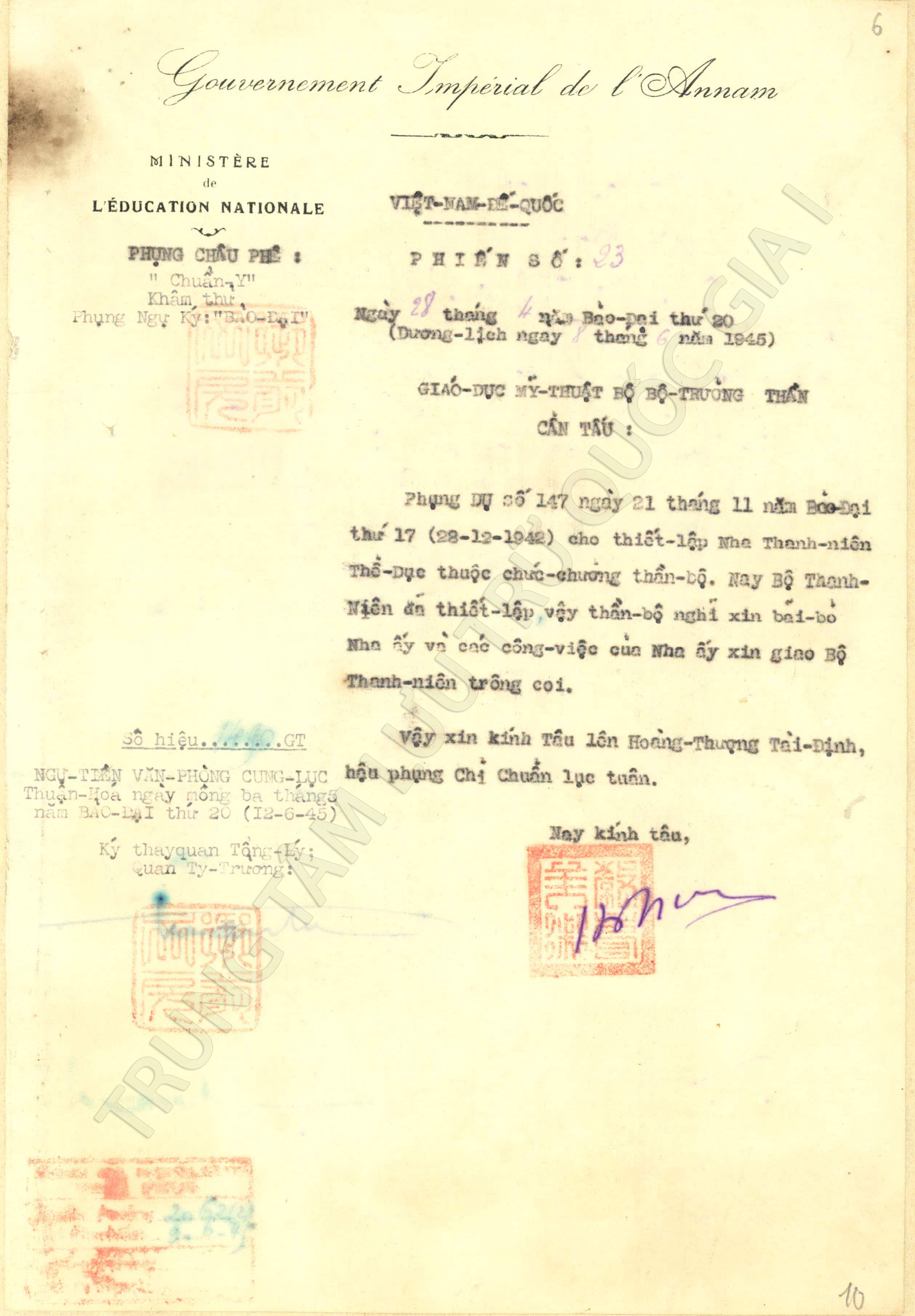
A document on the abolition of the Department of Youth and Sports of the Ministry of Education and Fine Arts and transferring its duties to the newly established Ministry of Youth Affairs (28-04-Bảo Đại 20–1 June 1945).

Following the Japanese coup d'état in French Indochina, the Bảo Đại Emperor issued an imperial edict revoking the protectorate treaty of 1884 restoring Vietnamese independence from France, but in reality the Empire of Vietnam was a Japanese puppet state. Trần Trọng Kim, a renowned historian and scholar, was chosen to lead the government as its prime minister.

Trần Trọng Kim's government strongly emphasised educational reform, focusing on the development of technical training, particularly the use of romanised script (Chữ quốc ngữ) as the primary language of instruction. After less than two months in power, the Trần Trọng Kim cabinet organised the first primary examinations in Vietnamese, the language he intended to use in the advanced tests. Education minister Hoàng Xuân Hãn strove to Vietnamise public secondary education. His reforms took more than four months to achieve their results, and have been regarded as a stepping stone for the successor Việt Minh government's launch of compulsory mass education. On June 3, 1945, the Bảo Đại Emperor issued Edict No. 67 (dụ số 67) officially giving up French as the main language of education and applying the educational programme of Hoàng Xuân Hãn nationwide. As a result, the first baccalaureate exam in the Vietnamese language was in the 1944–1945 school year. The total number of schools nationwide includes 4952 primary schools (284,341 students, primary school diploma), 25 elementary colleges (2,000 students, college diploma exam) and 4 high schools (500 students, Baccalaureate exam) has long used French to teach, now it has changed to Vietnamese.

In June 1945 the Ministry of Education and Fine Arts opted to abolish its Department of Youth and Sports and transfer its duties to the newly established Ministry of Youth Affairs, which would also create regional youth councils throughout Vietnam.

In July 1945, when the Japanese decided to grant Vietnam full independence and territorial unification, Kim's government was about to begin a new round of reform, by naming a committee to create a new national education system. The Education Reform Council had 18 members, which included notable people such as Hoàng Xuân Hãn, Hoàng Thị Nga, Nguyễn Mạnh Tường, Hoàng Minh Giám, Bùi Kỷ, Ngụy Như Kontum, Ưng Quả, and Hồ Văn Ngà.

=== Aftermath ===
After the August Revolution and the abolition of the Nguyễn dynasty the Democratic Republic of Vietnam would have a new Ministry of National Education headed by Vũ Đình Hòe of the Democratic Party of Vietnam.

The education programme created by the Empire of Vietnam's Ministry of Education and Fine Arts was also the foundation for the education programme of the Democratic Republic of Vietnam and the education of the Republic of Vietnam later. Vietnamese also would be used as an administrative language to record papers and for the writing of books.

== Headquarters ==
The headquarters of the Nguyễn dynasty's Ministry of Education were located next to the flower garden of the Court of the Imperial Clan, east of and just outside of the Imperial Citadel of Huế, just a short distance from Hiển Nhơn gate. In the 1933 article La Citadelle de Hué – onomastiques (Kinh thành Huế – địa danh) by Léopold Cadière published in the Bulletin des Amis du Vieux Hué it is noted that the building was formerly the private residence of the Dục Đức Emperor. After that it became a meeting place of the Viện cơ mật and during the reign of the Thành Thái Emperor it was converted into the Tôn Học School, a school for princes and princesses. During the beginning of the Duy Tân period it would become the headquarters of the Học Bộ.

The former headquarters of the Nguyễn dynasty's Ministry of Education was converted into Thành Nội High School from 1955 to 1957, which later changed its name to the Hàm Nghi High School. Afterwards the building became the headquarters of the Nha Học chánh Trung phần (Trung phần School District).

After 1975, the former headquarters of the Nguyễn period Ministry of Education area was used as the headquarters of the Department of Education of Bình Trị Thiên province of the Republic of South Vietnam and later the Socialist Republic of Vietnam.

As of December 2016 the former headquarters are located at the đường Hàn Thuyên (Hàn Thuyên Street), Đinh Tiên Hoàng, phường Thuận Thành (Thuận Thành ward) in the city of Huế, Thừa Thiên Huế province. The entrance to the building houses a gate inscribed with the four Traditional Chinese characters Học Bộ đường môn (學部堂門). The building now (as of 2016) serves as the headquarters of the Thừa Thiên Huế Books and School Equipment Company.

== List of ministers of Education of the Nguyễn dynasty ==
Number	Portrait	Name	chữ Hán	Title	Term of office
1		Cao Xuân Dục	高春育	Học Bộ Thượng thư (學部尚書) (Note: Modern Vietnamese: Thượng thư Bộ Học (尚書部學))	1907–1913
2		Hồ Đắc Trung	胡得忠	Học Bộ Thượng thư (學部尚書)	1913–1922
3		Thân Trọng Huề	申仲𢤮	Học Bộ Thượng thư (學部尚書)	1922–1925
4		Phạm Quỳnh	范瓊	Quốc dân Giáo dục Bộ Thượng thư (國民教育部尚書) (Note: Modern Vietnamese: Thượng thư Bộ Quốc gia Giáo dục (尚書部國家教育).)	1933–1942
5		Trần Thanh Đạt	陳清達	Quốc dân Giáo dục Bộ Thượng thư (國民教育部尚書)	12 May 1942 – 19 March 1945
6		Hoàng Xuân Hãn	黃春瀚	Bộ trưởng Bộ Giáo dục Mỹ thuật (部長教育美術部)	17 April 1945–23 August 1945

== Conflicting information ==
=== Date of establishment ===
In the South Vietnamese book Hoàng Việt Giáp Tý niên biểu written by Nguyễn Bá Trác and published by the South Vietnamese Ministry of National Education in Saigon in 1963 it explains on its page 358: "In early 1907, the Huế court sent two great ministers Cao Xuân Dục and Huỳnh Côn to lead the delegation to French Cochinchina to "discuss the subject of education" with the French. At the end of the year, they returned to Huế, right after that the government 'established the Ministry of Education.'" (Đầu năm 1907, triều đình Huế cử hai đại thần Cao Xuân Dục và Huỳnh Côn cầm đầu phái đoàn vào Nam kỳ để “bàn nghị học chính” với Pháp, cuối năm về Huế, ngay sau đó “thiết lập Bộ Học”).

Part 1 of the Encyclopedic Dictionary of Vietnam writes that "The state agency of the Nguyễn court during the French colonial period, specialising in studying and taking exams, was separated from the Ministry of Rites in 1907, during the reign of sovereign Duy Tân." (Cơ quan nhà nước của triều đình nhà Nguyễn thời thuộc Pháp, chuyên coi việc học hành, thi cử, được tách ra từ Bộ Lễ vào năm 1907, thời vua Duy Tân).

However, the 2001 book Địa danh thành phố Huế published by the Nxb Văn hoá dân tộc in Hanoi explains on its page 339: "The Ministry of Education was established during the Bảo Đại period after abolishing the Ministry of War in 1932" (Bộ Học thành lập thời Bảo Đại sau khi bỏ Bộ Binh vào năm 1932).

Researcher Nguyễn Thu Hường of the State Records and Archives Department of Vietnam notes that the 1907 date is correct as the archival record shows an imperial edict establishing the ministry in 1907.

=== Name controversy ===
On 6 April 2012 Hồ Vĩnh of the Vietnam National Museum of History published an article discussing a photograph of a document issued by the Nguyễn dynasty period Ministry of National Education published by Tạp chí Sông Hương Online (tapchisonghuong.com.vn). Hồ Vĩnh explained that the name of the ministry on the document is Quốc dân giáo dục bộ (國民教育部), so it should be referred to as the Bộ Quốc dân giáo dục, but that the Encyclopedic Dictionary of Vietnam writes: "Sau cải tổ Nam triều năm 1933, Bộ Học đổi thành Bộ Quốc gia giáo dục" (After the reform of the Southern Dynasty in 1933, the Ministry of Education was changed to the Ministry of National Education).

Hồ Vĩnh notes that this common misconception might be because of the Bộ Quốc gia giáo dục established by the Democratic Republic of Vietnam in 1945, which did use Quốc gia instead of Quốc dân.

== Gallery ==
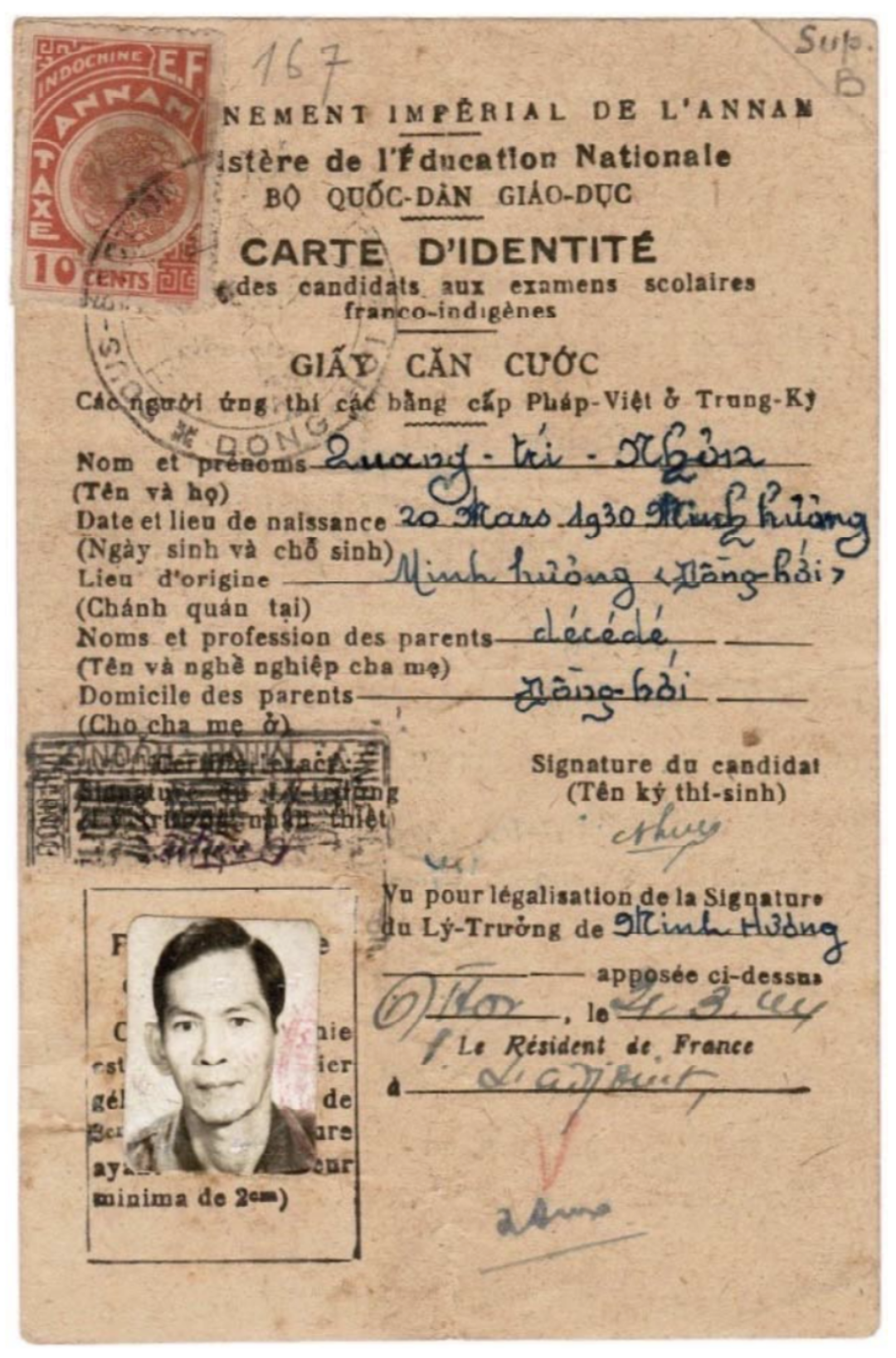
An identity card issued by the ministry dated 4 March 1944. These were issued to candidates of Franco-Indigenous exams.

== Sources ==
- Bộ Quốc Gia Giáo dục, Chương Trình Trung Học (Ministry of National Education, High School Programmes) Nhóm Cựu Học Sinh Trường Bưởi xb, Hà Nội, 1945 (in Vietnamese).
