= Bình Điền =

Commune in Huế city, Vietnam

- Commune
- Country: Vietnam
- Region: North Central
- Centrally- governed city: Huế
- Established: June 16, 2025

Government
  - Type: Commune
  - Body: People's Council of Bình Điền commune

Area
  - Total: 266.50 km^{2} (102.90 sq mi)

Population (2025)
  - Total: 15,229
  - Density: 57.144/km^{2} (148.00/sq mi)
- Time zone: UTC+07:00

Bình Điền is a commune in Huế city, Vietnam. It is one of 40 communes and wards in the city following the 2025 Vietnamese administrative reforms.

== Geography ==
Bình Điền is a commune in Huế city, located 20km west of Thuận Hóa ward. It borders with Hương Trà and Kim Trà wards to the north; A Lưới 5 commune to the south; Kim Long, Phú Bài wards to the east and Phong Thái ward to the west.

== History ==
On June 16, 2025, the Standing Committee of the National Assembly of Vietnam issued Resolution No. 1675/NQ-UBTVQH15 on the reorganization of commune-level administrative units in Huế city. Bình Điền commune was established by merging the entire area and population of Hương Bình, Bình Thành, Bình Tiến communes (formerly part of Hương Trà district-level town).
