= Hoàng Xuân Hãn =

Vietnamese historian (1908–1996)

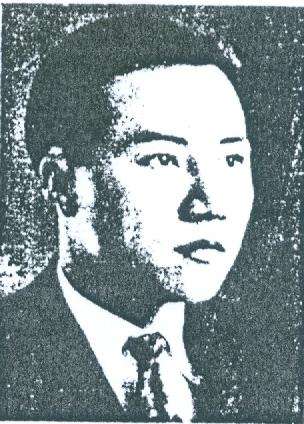

Minister of Education and Fine Arts
- In office 17 April 1945 – 23 August 1945
- Monarch: Bảo Đại Emperor
- Prime Minister: Trần Trọng Kim
- Preceded by: Trần Thanh Đạt (as Minister of National Education)
- Succeeded by: Vũ Đình Hòe (as Minister of National Education of the Democratic Republic of Vietnam)

Personal details
- Born: 8 March 1908 Yên Hồ, La Sơn, Hà Tĩnh, Annam, French Indochina
- Died: 10 March 1996 (aged 88) Paris, France
- Spouse: Nguyễn Thị Bính (m. 1936)
- Education: Pomelo School; Albert Sarraut School; École Polytechnique; École nationale des ponts et chaussées Sorbonne University
- Profession: Professor of mathematics, linguist, historian, and educationalist
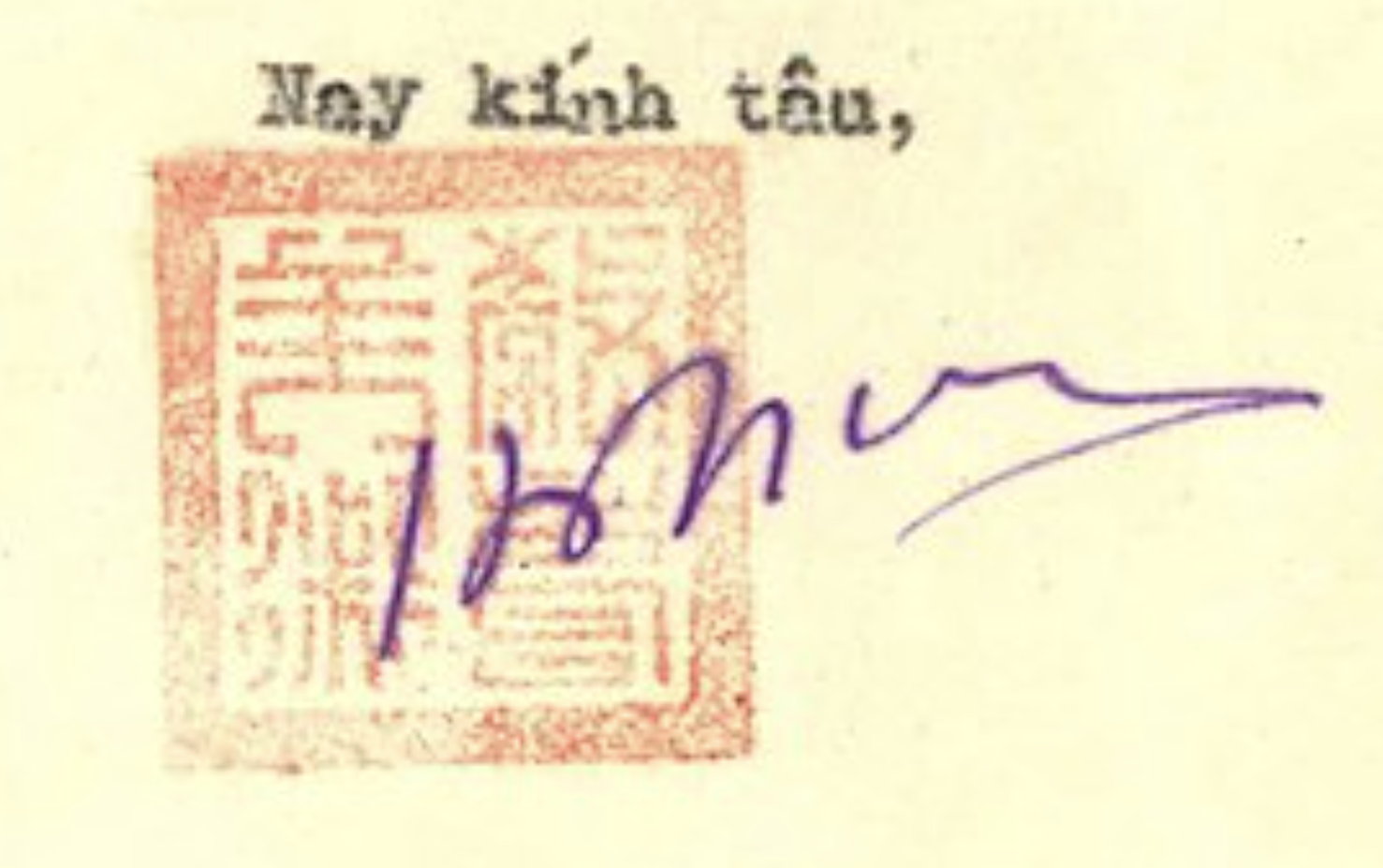
- Signature

Hoàng Xuân Hãn (Đức Thọ, 1908 – Paris, 10 March 1996) was a Vietnamese professor of mathematics, linguist, historian and educationalist. He was Minister of Education in the short-lived 1945 cabinet of historian Trần Trọng Kim and drafted and issued the first Vietnamese education program.

Like many of the academics in the five-month Trần Trọng Kim government, afterwards Hãn returned to academic studies. He was the first Vietnamese historian to fully study the history of Nôm texts by the 17th Century Jesuits such as Girolamo Maiorica.

Nguyen Ngoc Bich, a Francophile anticolonialist, resistance hero against the French colonialists in Vietnam's First Indochina War, medical doctor, and politician was a close friend of Hoàng Xuân Hãn.

== See also ==
- Hoàng Xuân Sính, Vietnamese mathematician.
