= Phong Dinh =

Ward in Huế city, Vietnam

- Ward
- Phước Tích ancient village
- Country: Vietnam
- Region: North Central
- Centrally- governed city: Huế
- Established: June 16, 2025

Government
  - Type: Ward
  - Body: People's Council of Phong Dinh ward

Area
  - Total: 87.16 km^{2} (33.65 sq mi)

Population (2025)
  - Total: 28,012
  - Density: 321.4/km^{2} (832.4/sq mi)
- Time zone: UTC+07:00

Phong Dinh is a ward in Huế city, Vietnam. It is one of 40 wards and communes in the city following the administrative reforms in 2025.

== Geography ==
Phong Dinh is a ward located in the north of Huế city, 30km northwest of Phú Xuân ward. It borders with Phong Điền, Phong Thái wards to the south; Quảng Trị province to the west, Phong Phú ward to the north and Đan Điền commune to the east.

== History ==
On June 16, 2025, the Standing Committee of the National Assembly of Vietnam issued Resolution No. 1675/NQ-UBTVQH15 on the reorganization of commune-level administrative units in Huế city. Phong Dinh commune was established by merging the entire area and population of Phong Hòa ward and Phong Bình, Phong Chương communes (formerly part of Phong Điền district-level town).
