= A Lưới 5 =

Commune in Huế city, Vietnam

- Commune
- Interactive map of A Lưới 5
- Country: Vietnam
- Region: North Central
- Centrally- governed city: Huế
- Established: June 16, 2025

Government
  - Type: Commune
  - Body: People's Council of A Lưới 5

Area
  - Total: 464.40 km^{2} (179.31 sq mi)

Population (2025)
  - Total: 3,760
  - Density: 8.10/km^{2} (21.0/sq mi)
- Time zone: UTC+07:00

A Lưới 5 is a commune in Huế city, Vietnam. It is one of 40 communes and wards in the city. This is the administrative unit with the smallest population in Huế city.

== Geography ==
A Lưới 5 is a commune in Huế city, Vietnam. It is located 30km southwest of Thuận Hóa ward. It borders with A Lưới 1, A Lưới 2, A Lưới 3, A Lưới 4 and Lao People's Democratic Republic to the west; Phong Điền and Phong Thái wards to the north; Phú Bài ward and Bình Điền, Long Quảng communes to the east; Da Nang city to the south.

== History ==
On June 16, 2025, the Standing Committee of the National Assembly of Vietnam issued Resolution No. 1675/NQ-UBTVQH15 on the reorganization of commune-level administrative units in Huế city. A Lưới 2 commune was established by merging the entire area and population of Hương Nguyên and Hồng Hạ communes (formerly part of A Lưới district).
