= Nguyen Thi Thanh =

Nguyen Thi Thanh may refer to:

- Nguyễn Thị Thanh (1884–1954), Vietnamese female, older sister of Ho Chi Minh
- Nguyễn Thị Thành (born 1986), Vietnamese women's international footballer
- Nguyễn Thị Thanh (chef) (1967–2025), Vietnamese chef and restaurateur
- Nguyễn Thị Thanh (politician) (born 1967), Member of the Standing Committee of the Ninh Bình Provincial Party Committee and Chairwoman of the Public Relations Committee of the Ninh Bình Party Committee. See 11th Central Committee of the Communist Party of Vietnam
