= An Cựu =

Ward in Huế city, Vietnam

- Ward
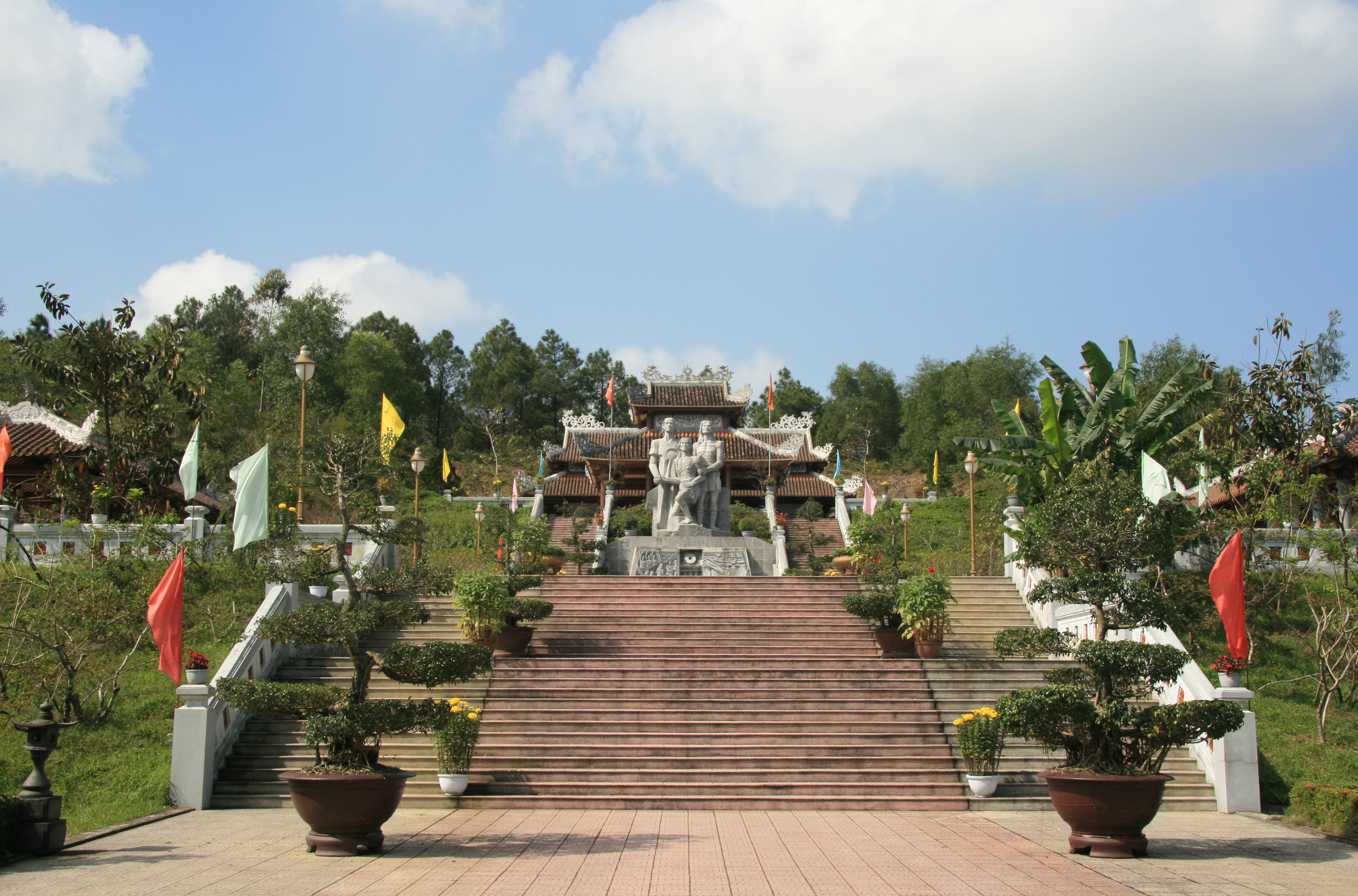
- Chín Hầm historical site
- Interactive map of An Cựu
- Country: Vietnam
- Region: North Central
- Centrally- governed city: Huế
- Established: June 16, 2025

Government
  - Type: Ward
  - Body: People's Council of An Cựu ward

Area
  - Total: 16.71 km^{2} (6.45 sq mi)

Population
  - Total: 55,305
  - Density: 3,310/km^{2} (8,572/sq mi)
- Time zone: UTC+07:00

An Cựu is a ward in Huế city, Vietnam. It is one of 40 wards and communes in the city.

== Geography ==
An Cựu is a ward in Huế city, Vietnam, located 540km south of Hanoi and 640km north of Ho Chi Minh City. It borders with Vỹ Dạ ward to the north, Thanh Thủy ward to the east, Thuận Hóa ward to the northwest and Thủy Xuân ward to the southwest and south.

== Subdivisions ==
An Cựu ward is divided into 24 neighborhoods, numbered from 1 to 24.

== History ==
On June 16, 2025, the Standing Committee of the National Assembly of Vietnam issued Resolution No. 1675/NQ-UBTVQH15 on the reorganization of commune-level administrative units in Huế city. An Cựu ward was established by merging the entire area and population of An Đông, An Tây, and An Cựu wards (formerly part of Thuận Hóa urban district).
