= Phú Xuân (disambiguation) =

Phú Xuân is the name of a historical capital of Vietnam, which is now the city of Huế. Phú Xuân may also refer to several other places in Vietnam:

- Phú Xuân ward, Huế city
- Phú Xuân commune, Đắk Lắk province
- Phú Xuân commune, Thanh Hóa province
- Former Phú Xuân urban district of Huế city.
