= Phong Điền, Huế =

Ward in Huế city, Vietnam

Phong Điền
- Ward
- Interactive map of Phong Điền
- Coordinates: 16.582355903204853°N 107.3659568177576°E
- Country: Vietnam
- Region: North Central
- Centrally- governed city: Huế
- Established: June 16, 2025
- People's Committee headquarters: 31 Phò Trạch

Area
  - Total: 592.48 km^{2} (228.76 sq mi)

Population (2025)
  - Total: 27,862
  - Density: 47.026/km^{2} (121.80/sq mi)
- Website: phongdien.hue.gov.vn

Phong Điền is a ward in Huế city, Vietnam. It is one of 40 wards and communes in the city following the 2025 reorganization and this is the ward with the largest area in Huế city.

== Geography ==
Phong Điền is a ward located in the north of Huế city, 35km northwest of Thuận Hóa ward. It borders with Quảng Trị province to the north and west; A Lưới 1 and A Lưới 5 communes to the south; Phong Thái ward to the east and Phong Dinh ward to the northeast.

== History ==
On 16 June 2025, the Standing Committee of the National Assembly of Vietnam issued Resolution No. 1675/NQ-UBTVQH15 on the reorganization of commune-level administrative units of Huế in 2025. Phong Điền ward was established by merging the entire area and population of Phong Thu ward and Phong Mỹ and Phong Xuân communes (formerly part of Phong Điền district-level town).
