= A Lưới 4 =

Commune in Huế city, Vietnam

- Commune
- Interactive map of A Lưới 4
- Coordinates: 16°08′31″N 107°20′47″E
- Country: Vietnam
- Region: North Central
- Centrally- governed city: Huế
- Established: June 16, 2025

Government
  - Type: Commune
  - Body: People's Council of A Lưới 4 commune

Area
  - Total: 233.66 km^{2} (90.22 sq mi)

Population (2025)
  - Total: 10,752
  - Density: 46.016/km^{2} (119.18/sq mi)
- Time zone: UTC+07:00

A Lưới 4 is a commune in Huế city, Vietnam. It is one of 40 communes and wards in the province following the 2025 reorganization.

== Geography ==
A Lưới 4 is a commune located southwest of Huế city, 45km southwest of Thuận Hóa ward. It borders with Lao People’s Democratic Republic to the south; A Lưới 5 commune to the northeast and east; A Lưới 3 commune to the northwest and west.

== History ==
On June 16, 2025, the Standing Committee of the National Assembly of Vietnam issued Resolution No. 1675/NQ-UBTVQH15 on the reorganization of commune-level administrative units in Huế city. A Lưới 4 commune was established by merging the entire area and population of Hương Phong, A Roàng, Đông Sơn and Lâm Đớt communes (formerly part of A Lưới district).
