= A Lưới 2 =

Commune in Huế city, Vietnam

- Commune
- A view in A Lưới 2 commune
- Interactive map of A Lưới 2
- Country: Vietnam
- Region: North Central
- Centrally- governed city: Huế
- Established: June 16, 2025

Government
  - Type: Commune
  - Body: People's Council of A Lưới 2 commune

Area
  - Total: 97.62 km^{2} (37.69 sq mi)

Population (2025)
  - Total: 20,496
  - Density: 210.0/km^{2} (543.8/sq mi)
- Time zone: UTC+07:00
- Administrative code: 20044

A Lưới 2 is a commune in Huế city, Vietnam. It is one of 40 communes and wards in the city following the 2025 reorganization.

== Geography ==
A Lưới 2 is a commune in Huế city, Vietnam. It is located 45km southwest of Thuận Hóa ward, borders with A Lưới 1 commune to the north, A Lưới 5 commune to the east, A Lưới 3 commune to the south and Lao People's Democratic Republic to the west.

== History ==
On June 16, 2025, the Standing Committee of the National Assembly of Vietnam issued Resolution No. 1675/NQ-UBTVQH15 on the reorganization of commune-level administrative units in Huế city. A Lưới 2 commune was established by merging the entire area and population of A Lưới commune-level town and Hồng Bắc, Quảng Nhâm, A Ngo communes (formerly part of A Lưới district).
