= Six Ministries of the Nguyễn dynasty =

Government ministries of the Nguyễn dynasty

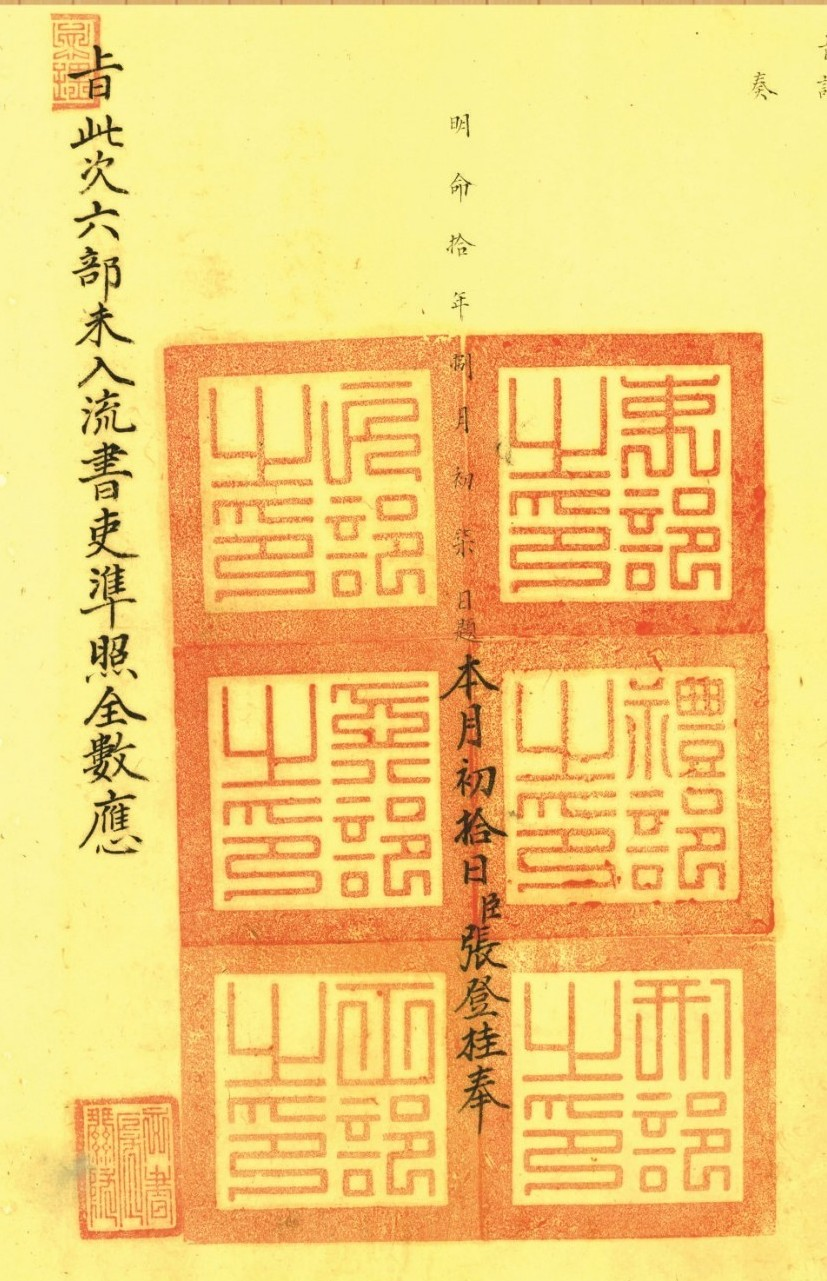
The great seals of the Six Ministries of the Nguyễn Dynasty in the year Minh Mạng 10 (1829).

The Six Ministries (Vietnamese: Sáu bộ, chữ Nôm: 𦒹部; Sino-Vietnamese: Lục bộ, chữ Hán: 六部), or the Six Boards, were the major executive parts of the government of the Nguyễn period Vietnamese state from its establishment under the Gia Long Emperor in 1802 until 1906, with the establishment of the Học Bộ (chữ Hán: 學部) in 1907. These six core ministries would exist largely unchanged until the 1933 reforms of the Southern Court by the Bảo Đại Emperor.

== History ==
The Six Boards included:

1. Administration (Lại Bộ, 吏部)
2. Finance (Hộ Bộ, 戸部)
3. Laws (Hình Bộ, 刑部)
4. Military Affairs (Binh Bộ, 兵部)
5. Public works (Công Bộ, 工部)
6. Rites (Lễ Bộ, 禮部)

The Six Boards were established in 1802 after Gia Long's coronation, however they were not fully operational until 1830. Each board had a president (Thượng thư, 尚書), supported by two vice-presidents (Tham tri, 參知). In 1826 emperor Minh Mạng added two vice-minister into each board (Thị lang, 侍郎). By the mid-1840s, the six ministries comprised almost 100 people, included secretaries serving on their boards. In 1907, emperor Duy Tân founded the Ministry of Education to take over a number of functions of the Board of Rites. Cao Xuân Dục was chosen to be its first minister.

=== Gallery ===
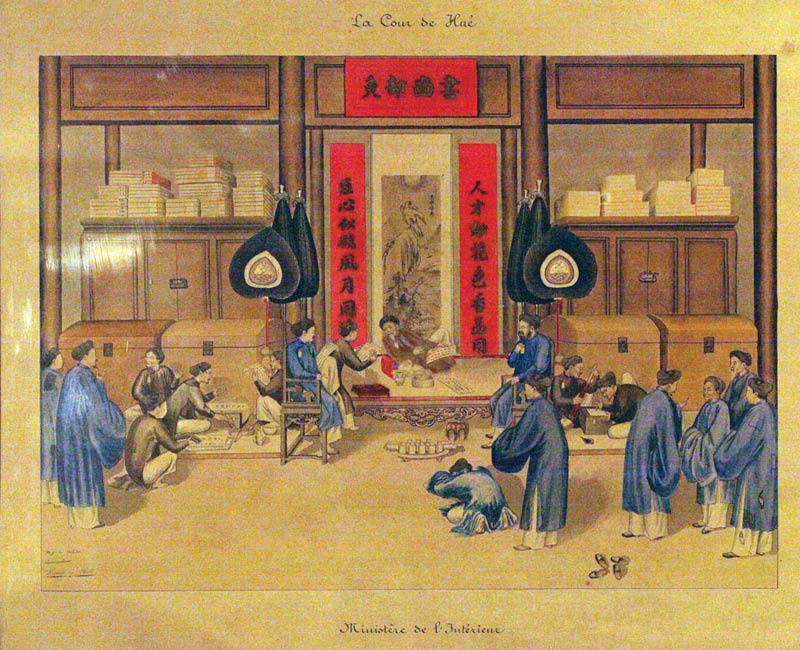
- Ministry of Administration
- (Lại Bộ, 吏部)

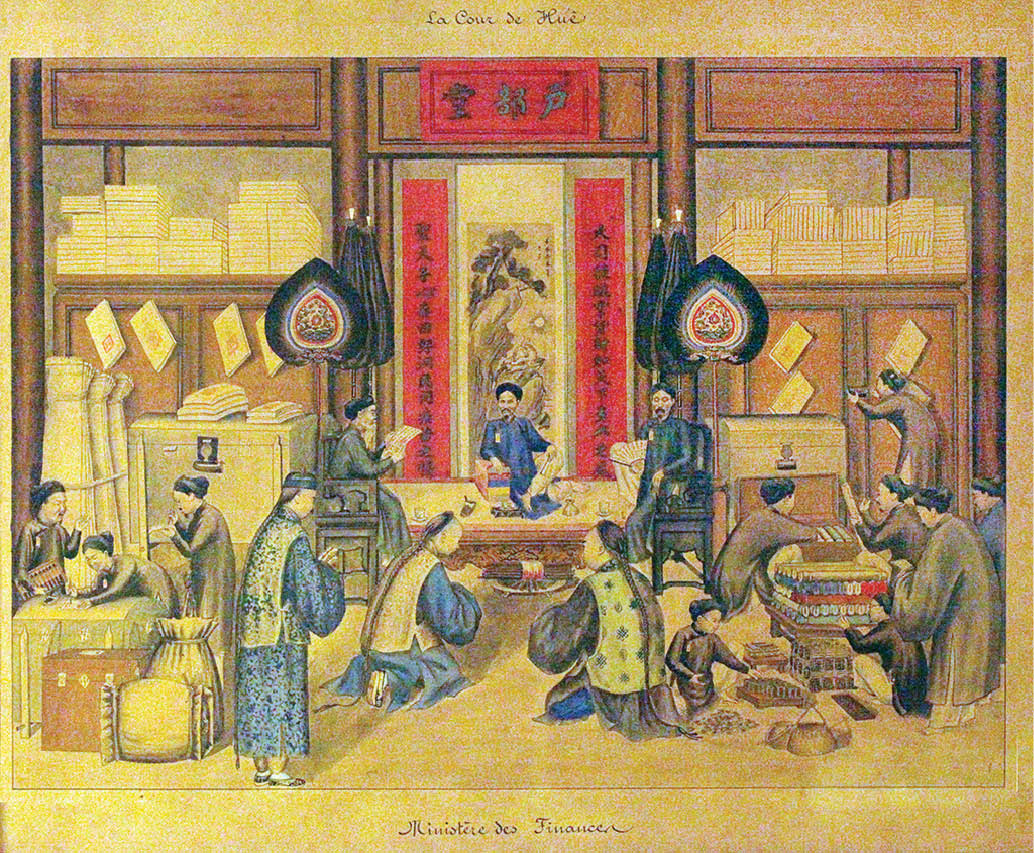
- Ministry of Finance
- (Hộ Bộ, 戸部)

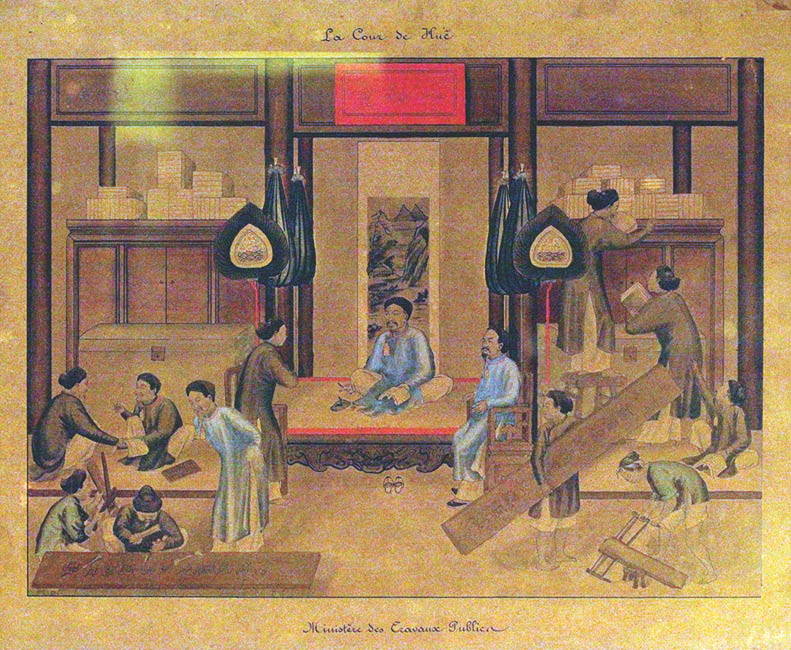
- Ministry of Public Works
- (Công Bộ, 工部)

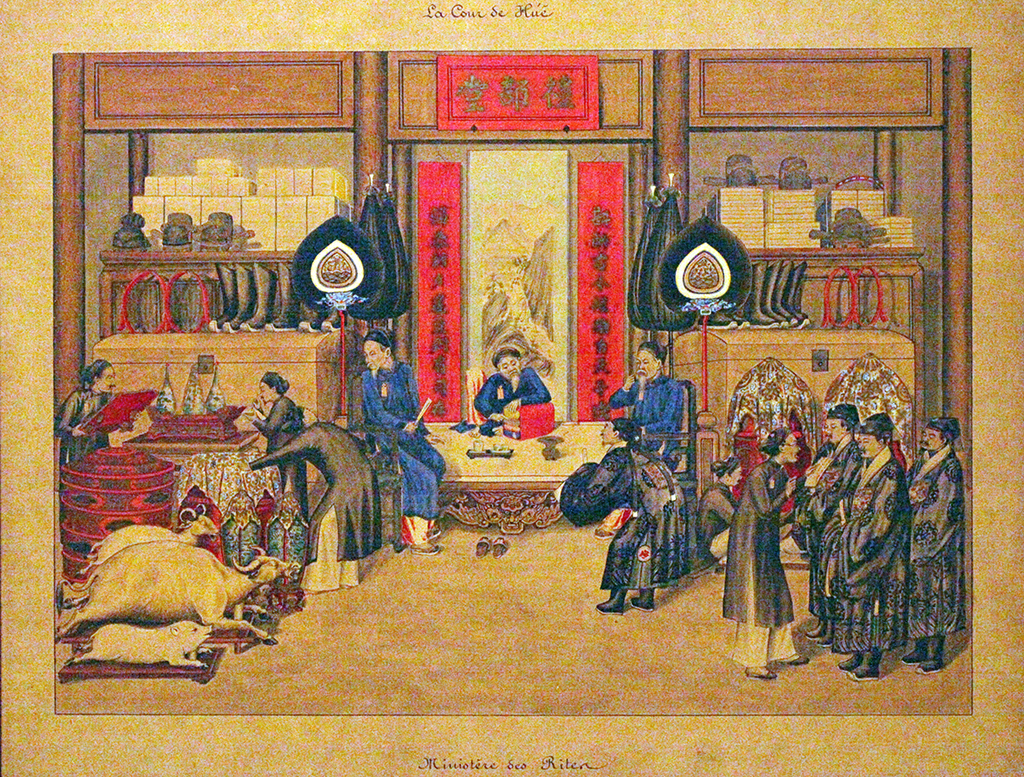
- Ministry of Rites
- (Lễ Bộ, 禮部)

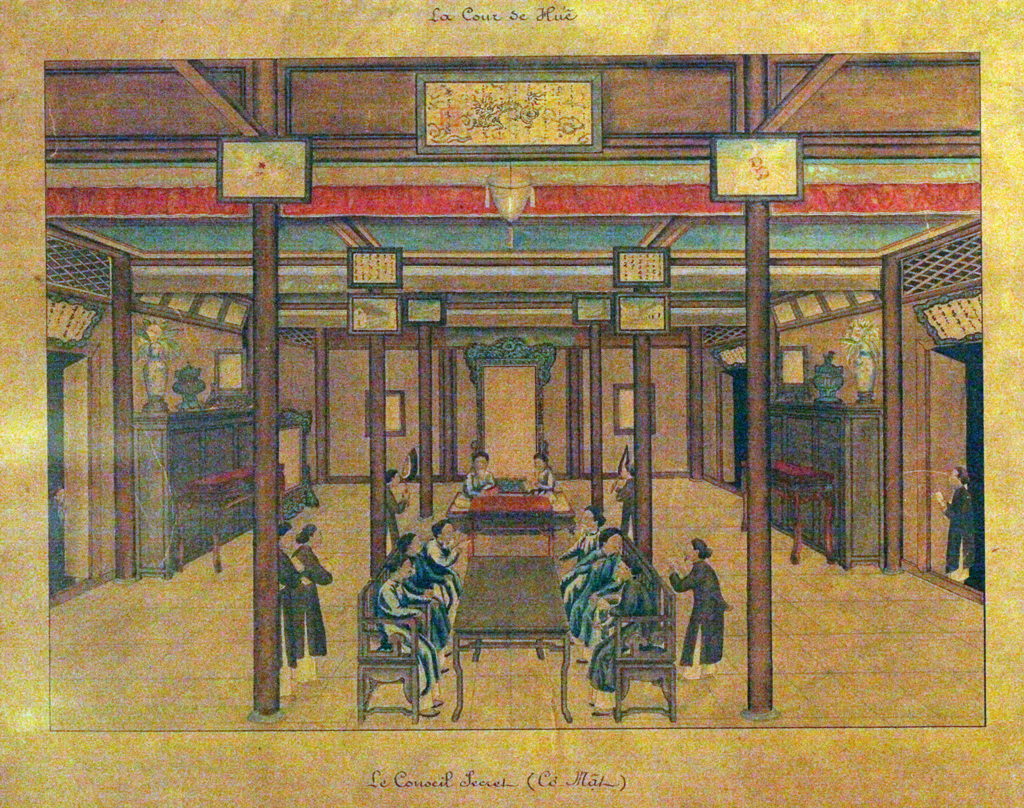
- Privy Council of the Nguyen Dynasty
- (Cơ Mật Viện, 機密院)

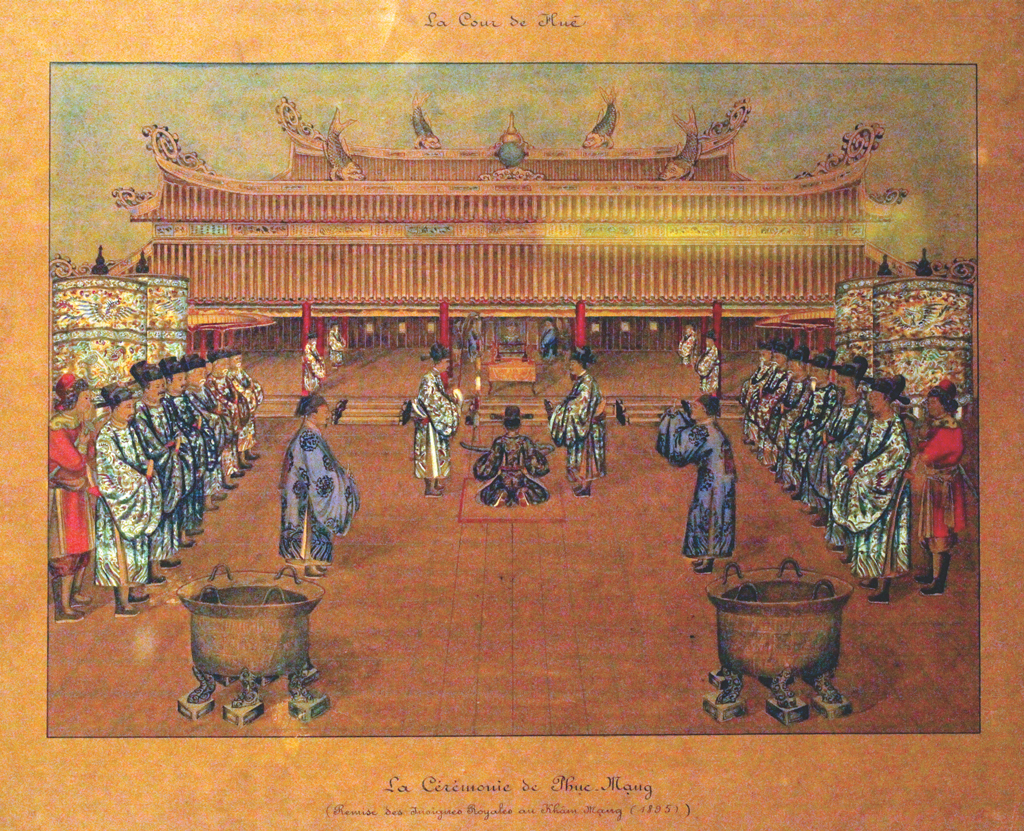
Phục mạng ceremony when mandarins received an edict from the Emperor

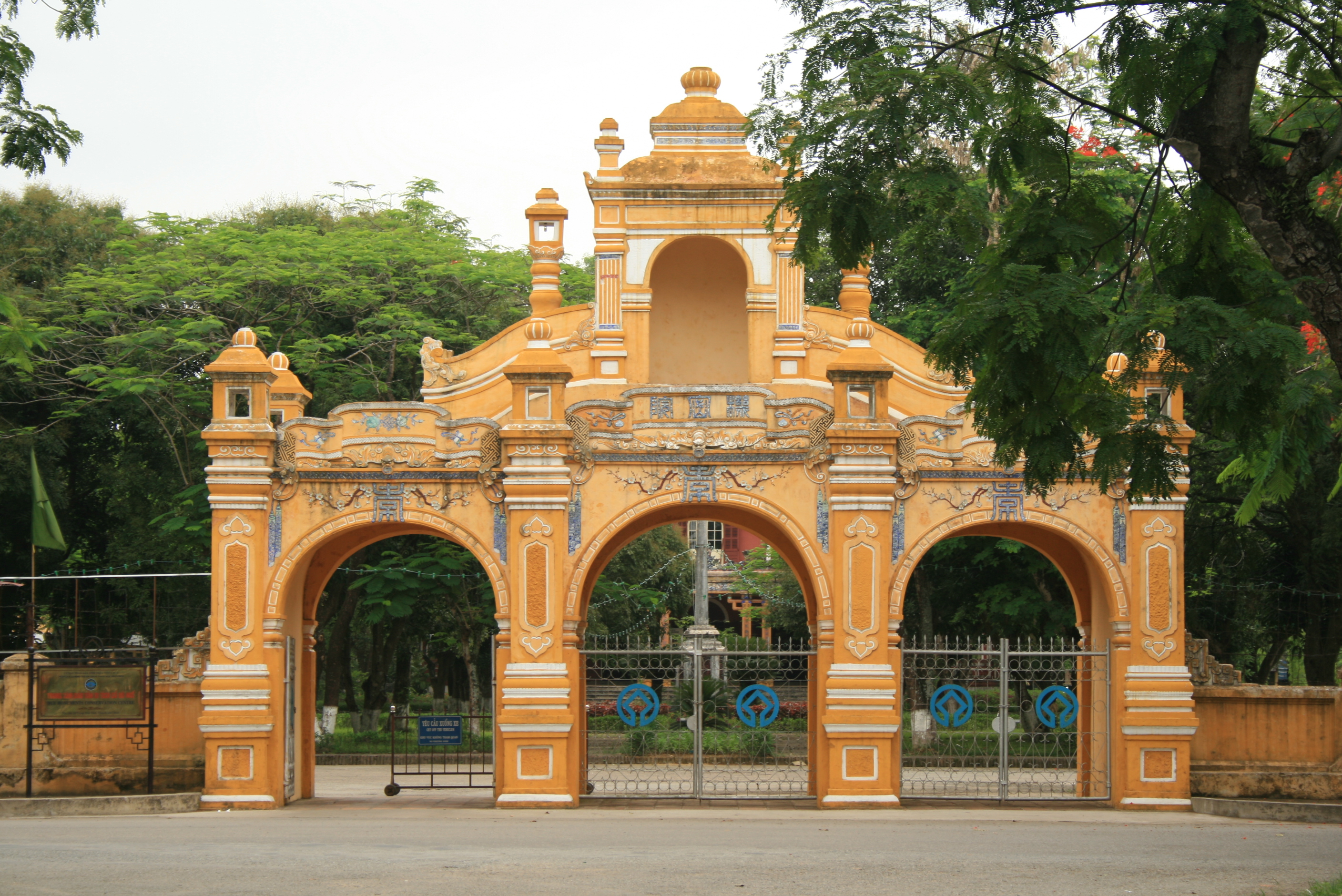
Headquarter of the Privy Council

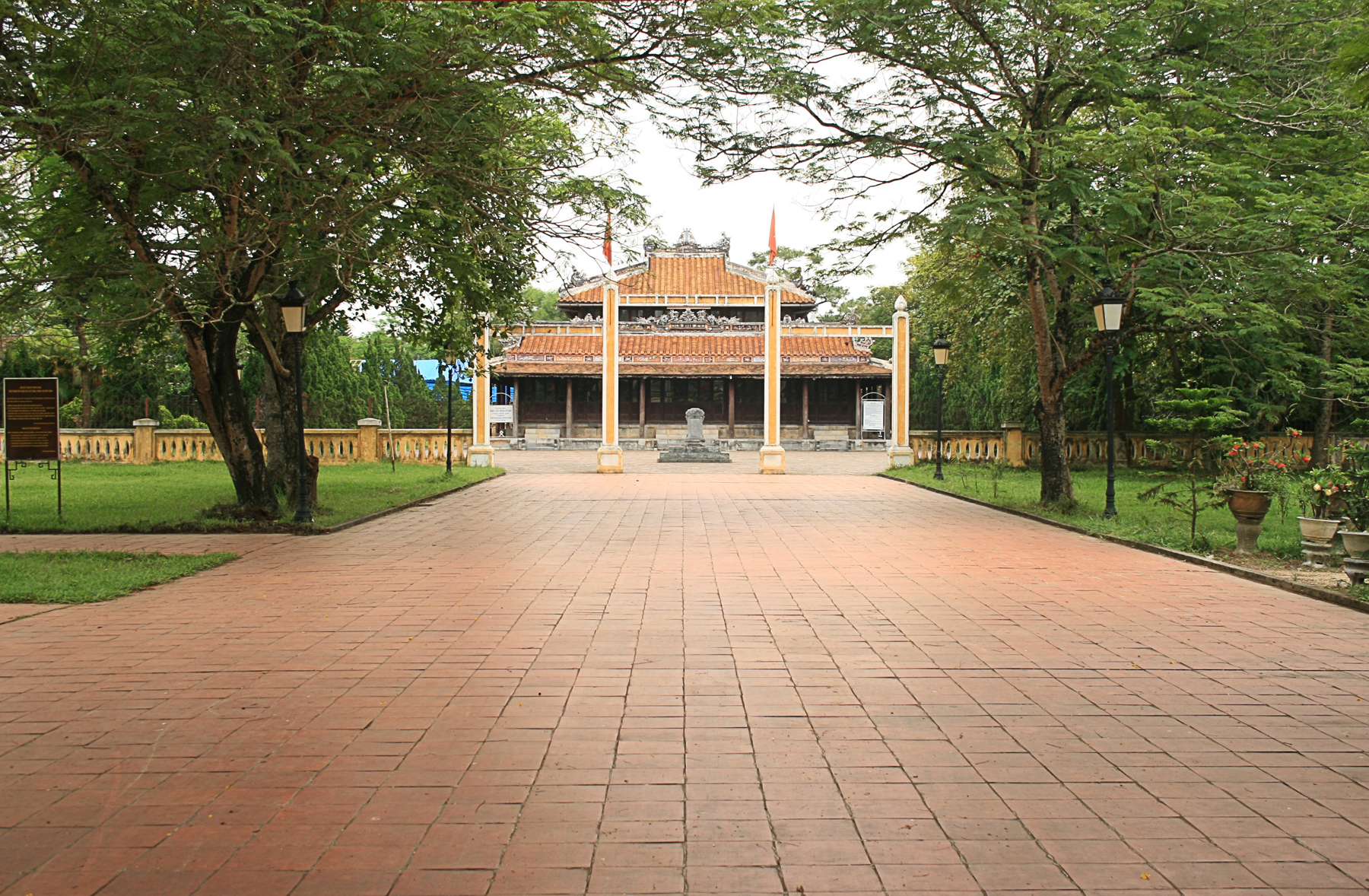
Imperial Academy, Huế, under Ministry of Education (Học Bộ, 學部)

== See also ==
- Six Ministries of Joseon
- Three Departments and Six Ministries
