= Nguyễn Thị Thanh (chef) =

Vietnamese chef and restauranteur (1967–2025)

Nguyễn Thị Thanh (1967 – 19 May 2025), notably known as Lunch Lady, was a Vietnamese chef and restaurateur, and the founder of the Lunch Lady food stall in Ho Chi Minh City, Vietnam. Nguyễn's restaurant rose to prominence following a feature in Anthony Bourdain's No Reservations television show in 2008.

== Career ==
Born in Bình Trị Thiên, Nguyễn moved to Bến Tre after getting married before settling in Ho Chi Minh City in the 1990s. She opened the stall that would later be known as the Lunch Lady in 1995, where it served a rotating lunch menu of noodle soups for local office workers.

Nguyễn partnered with Canadian Michael Tran to open the Lunch Lady Canada, with its first location in Vancouver. A Toronto location opened in June 2025.

Nguyễn died on May 19, 2025 shortly after arriving at Toronto-Pearson International Airport prior to the opening of the Lunch Lady Toronto.
