= A Lưới 1 =

Commune in Huế city, Vietnam

- Commune
- Interactive map of A Lưới 1
- Country: Vietnam
- Region: North Central
- Centrally- governed city: Huế
- Established: June 16, 2025

Government
  - Type: Commune
  - Body: People's Council of A Lưới 1 commune

Area
  - Total: 198.59 km^{2} (76.68 sq mi)

Population
  - Total: 12,403
  - Density: 62.455/km^{2} (161.76/sq mi)
- Time zone: UTC+07:00
- Administrative code: 20056
- Website: http://aluoi1.hue.gov.vn/

A Lưới 1 is a commune in Huế city, Vietnam. It is one of 40 communes and wards in the city following the 2025 Vietnamese administrative reforms.

== Geography ==
A Lưới 1 is a commune located west of Huế city, 50km west of Thuận Hóa ward. It borders with Phong Điền ward to the north; Quảng Trị province to the northwest, Lao People's Democratic Republic and A Lưới 2 commune to the south, A Lưới 5 commune to the east.

== History ==
On June 16, 2025, the Standing Committee of the National Assembly of Vietnam issued Resolution No. 1675/NQ-UBTVQH15 on the reorganization of commune-level administrative units in Huế city. A Lưới 1 commune was established by merging the entire area and population of Hồng Thủy, Hồng Vân, Trung Sơn, and Hồng Kim communes (formerly part of A Lưới district).
