= Bình Trị Thiên province =

Province of Vietnam, 1975 to 1989

Bình Trị Thiên
- Province of Vietnam
- 1975–1989
- Bình Trị Thiên province on the administrative map of Vietnam in 1976
- Capital: Huế
- Area
  - 1975—1989: 18,340 km^{2} (7,080 sq mi)
- Population
  - 1979: 1,851,600
  - 1981: 1,941,000
  - 1984: 2,020,500
- Government
- Provincial People's Committee Chairman
  - 1976: Nguyễn Húng
  - 1977–1981: Bùi San (Đặng Trần Thi)
  - 1981–1985: Vũ Thắng
  - 1985–1989: Nguyễn Văn Lương
- Historical era: Cold War
  - Established: 1975
  - Disestablished: 30 June 1989
- Subdivisions
  - Type: Districts, towns, communes
Preceded by
Quảng Bình
Vĩnh Linh Special Zone
Vietnamese Demilitarised Zone
Quảng Trị
Thừa Thiên
Succeeded by
Quảng Bình
Quảng Trị
Thừa Thiên Huế

Bình Trị Thiên was a province of Vietnam from 1975 to 1989. The province was established by merging Quảng Bình, Quảng Trị and Thừa Thiên provinces. This province corresponds to the present-day Huế city and Quảng Trị province.

The grouping did not work well and was reversed in 1992. The geographical term had been used previously, in relation to culture and folk songs. It is still used in relation to dialect and folk songs.

== Geography ==
Binh Tri Thien province has the geographical location:

- The North borders on the province Nghệ Tinh
- The South borders on the province Quang Nam - Da Nang
- East sea bordering the east
- The West borders Laos.

== History ==
In 1976, these three provinces were merged by the Government Republic of South Vietnam into a province with a provincial capital based in the city Hue. According to Decision on June 30, 1989, of the VIII National Assembly, the 5th session, these three provinces were split again, but after the split, Thua Thien province had a new name: Thua Thien - Hue.

When unified, Binh Tri Thien province initially had 23 administrative units including: Hue city (provincial capital), 2 towns Dong Ha, Dong Hoi and 20 districts: A Luoi, Bo Trach, Cam Lo, Gio Linh, Hai Lang, Huong Hoa, Huong Thuy, Huong Tra, Le Thuy, Minh Hoa, South East, Phong Dien, Phu Loc, Phu Vang, Quang Dien, Quang Ninh, Quang Trach, Trieu Phong, Tuyen Hoa, Vinh Linh.

According to Decision No. 62-CP of the Government Council Vietnam Democratic Republic dated March 11, 1977, the districts were merged and the changes were as follows:

- Merge two districts Phu Loc, Nam Dong and 2 communes: Vinh Xuan, Vinh Thanh of the district Phu Vang into a new district of Phu Loc
- Merge two districts of Phu Vang (except for 2 communes: Vinh Xuan, Vinh Thanh) and Huong Thuy into a district Huong Phu
- Merge the three districts Phong Dien, Quang Dien, Huong Tra into the district Huong Dien
- Merge the two districts Trieu Phong, Hai Lang into the district Trieu Hai
- Merge the two districts Le Thuy, Quang Ninh into districts Le Ninh
- Merging three districts Vinh Linh, Gio Linh, Cam Lo into district Ben Hai
- Consolidate the two districts Minh Hoa, Tuyen Hoa (except for 9 communes: Van Hoa, Phu Hoa, Canh Hoa, Tien Hoa, Mai Hoa, Chau Hoa, Ngu Hoa, Cao Hoa and Quang Hoa) to become a new district of Tuyen Hoa
- Merging 9 communes: Culture, Phu Hoa, Canh Hoa, Tien Hoa, Mai Hoa, Chau Hoa, Ngu Hoa, Cao Hoa and Quang Hoa of Tuyen Hoa district into the district Quang Trach
- Merging Huong Lap commune of Vinh Linh district into the district Huong Hoa.

Since then, Binh Tri Thien province has the capital city of Hue, 2 towns: Dong Ha, Dong Hoi and 11 districts: A Luoi, Ben Hai, Bo Trach, Huong Dien, Huong Hoa, Huong Phu, Le Ninh, Phu Loc, Quang Trach, Trieu Hai, Tuyen Hoa.

On June 30, 1989, the 5th session of the VIIIth National Assembly issued a resolution to divide Binh Tri Thien province to re-establish Quang Binh, Quang Tri and Thua Thien - Hue provinces:

- Quang Binh province includes Dong Hoi town and 4 districts: Bo Trach, Le Ninh, Quang Trach, Tuyen Chemistry.
- Quang Tri province has Dong Ha town and 3 districts: Ben Hai, Huong Hoa, Trieu Hai.
- Thua Thien - Hue province has Hue city and 4 districts: A Luoi, Huong Dien, Huong Phu, Phu Loc.

== Provincial People's Committee Chairman through the periods ==
1. Nguyen Hua
2. Bui San (1977-1981)
3. Vu Thang (1981-1985)
4. Nguyen Van Luong (1985-1989).

== Songs about Binh Tri Thien ==
- Binh Tri Thien smoke and fire by Nguyen Van Thuong.
