= A Lưới 3 =

Commune in Huế city, Vietnam

- Commune
- Bốt Đỏ market
- Interactive map of A Lưới 3
- Country: Vietnam
- Region: North Central
- Centrally- governed city: Huế
- Established: June 16, 2025

Government
  - Type: Commune
  - Body: People's Council of A Lưới 3 commune

Area
  - Total: 154.23 km^{2} (59.55 sq mi)

Population (2025)
  - Total: 8,976
  - Density: 58.20/km^{2} (150.7/sq mi)
- Time zone: UTC+07:00
- Administrative code: 20071

A Lưới 3 is a commune in Huế city, Vietnam. It is one of 40 communes and wards in the city following the 2025 reorganization.

== Geography ==
A Lưới 3 is a commune located west of Huế city, 45km southwest of Thuận Hóa ward. It borders with A Lưới 2 commune to the northwest, A Lưới 5 commune to the northeast, A Lưới 4 commune to the southeast, Lao People's Democratic Republic to the southwest and west.

== History ==
On June 16, 2025, the Standing Committee of the National Assembly of Vietnam issued Resolution No. 1675/NQ-UBTVQH15 on the reorganization of commune-level administrative units in Huế city. A Lưới 3 commune was established by merging the entire area and population of Sơn Thủy, Hồng Thượng, Phú Vinh and Hồng Thái communes (formerly part of A Lưới district).
