= Annam (French protectorate) =

1883–1949 French protectorate in southeast Asia

Protectorate of Annam Protectorat d'Annam (French) Xứ bảo hộ Trung Kỳ (Vietnamese) 處保護中圻 (Chữ Hán)
- 1883–1949
- Top: Protectorate flag Bottom: Civil flag Coat of arms
- Motto: "Liberté, égalité, fraternité" "Liberty, Equality, Fraternity"
- Anthem: "La Marseillaise" Royal anthem: Đăng đàn cung (English: "The Emperor Mounts His Throne")
- Imperial seal 皇帝之寶 (Hoàng Đế chi bảo) (Until 1945)

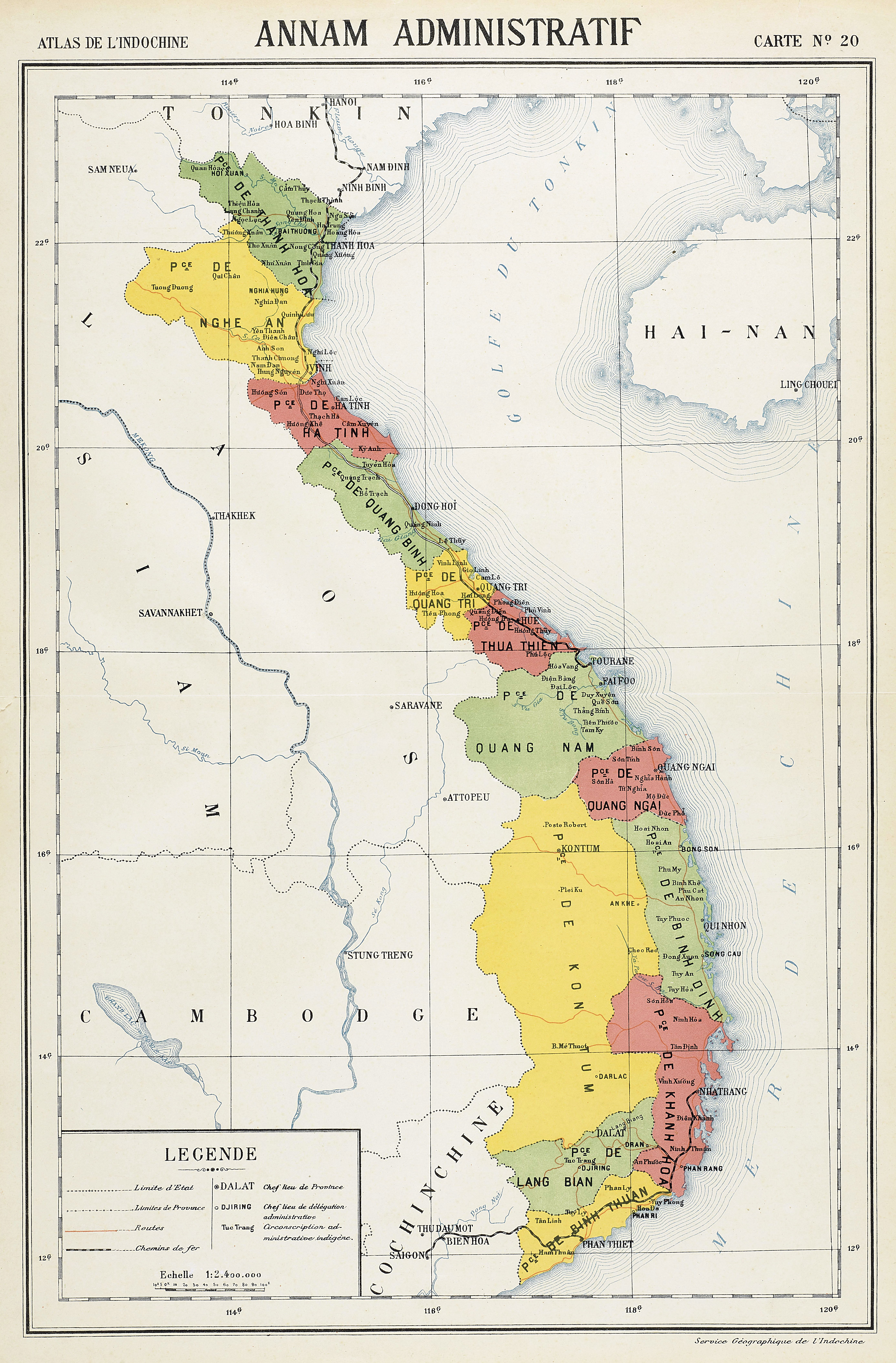
- Administrative divisions of the French Protectorate of Annam in 1920.
- Status: Protectorate of France; constituent territory of French Indochina
- Capital: Huế
- Common languages: Cham, Bahnar, Rade, Jarai, Stieng, Mnong, Koho, Chinese (Notably Cantonese, Hakka), French, Vietnamese
- Religion: Mahayana Buddhism; Confucianism; Taoism; Catholicism; Folk religion Hinduism; Islam
- Demonym: Annamite
- Government: Absolute monarchy under indirect rule (de jure): under direct rule (de facto; after 1897)
- Resident Superior
  - 1886–1888: Charles Dillon
  - 1947–1949: Henri Pierre Joseph Marie Lebris
- Emperor
  - 1884–1885: Hàm Nghi
  - 1889–1907: Thành Thái
  - 1916–1925: Khải Định
  - 1925–1945: Bảo Đại
- Legislature: None (rule by decree); House of Representatives (de jure advisory body)
- History
  - Harmand Treaty: 1883
  - Patenôtre Treaty: 6 June 1884
  - Abolition of the Nguyễn dynasty: 25 August 1945
  - Creation of the Provisional Central Government of Vietnam: 1948
  - Élysée Accords signed on March 8; ratification by the French in 1950, formally recognising the end of the protectorate over Vietnam: 1949
- Currency: Vietnamese cash, French Indochinese piastre
Preceded by	Succeeded by
Empire of Đại Nam	State of Vietnam; Democratic Republic of Vietnam
- Today part of: Vietnam

Annam (chữ Hán: 安南; alternate spelling: Anam), or Trung Kỳ (中圻), was a French protectorate encompassing what is now Central Vietnam from 1883 to 1949. Like the French protectorate of Tonkin, it was nominally ruled by the Vietnamese Nguyễn dynasty. Before the protectorate's establishment, the name Annam was used in the West to refer to Vietnam as a whole; Vietnamese people were referred to as Annamites. The protectorate of Annam became a part of French Indochina in 1887. The region had a dual system of French and Vietnamese administration. The government of the Nguyễn dynasty still nominally ruled Annam and Tonkin as the Empire of Đại Nam, with the emperor residing in Huế. On 23 May 1948, the protectorate was partly merged in the Provisional Central Government of Vietnam, which was replaced the next year by the newly established State of Vietnam. The French legally maintained the protectorate until they formally signed over sovereignty to the Bảo Đại and the government of the State of Vietnam in 1950 after the Élysée Accords took over in June 1949. The region was divided between communist North Vietnam and anti-communist South Vietnam under the terms of the Geneva Accord of 1954.

== Etymology and pre-colonial usage ==
Annam means "Pacified South" in Sino-Vietnamese, the toponym being derived from the Chinese An Nan (Chinese: 安南; pinyin: Ānnán). In the history of Vietnam, the designation is one of several given by the Chinese to Tonkin, the core territory of modern-day Vietnam surrounding the city of Hanoi, which included land from the Gulf of Tonkin to the mountains which surround the plains of the Red River.

The name has also been applied to the Annamite Range (French: la Chaîne Annamitique), a 1,100 km (680 mi) mountain range with a height ranging up to 2,958 metres (9,705 ft) that divides Vietnam and Laos. The Vietnamese language or its central dialects were called "Annamese", as in the seminal dictionary Dictionarium Annamiticum Lusitanum et Latinum.

An Nam is usually considered offensively demeaning to Vietnamese people and mostly used in a sarcastic manner. Trung Kỳ (also spelled Trung Kì) is used instead in formal contexts. At least one dictionary has translated Annamiticum as Việt.

== Establishment ==
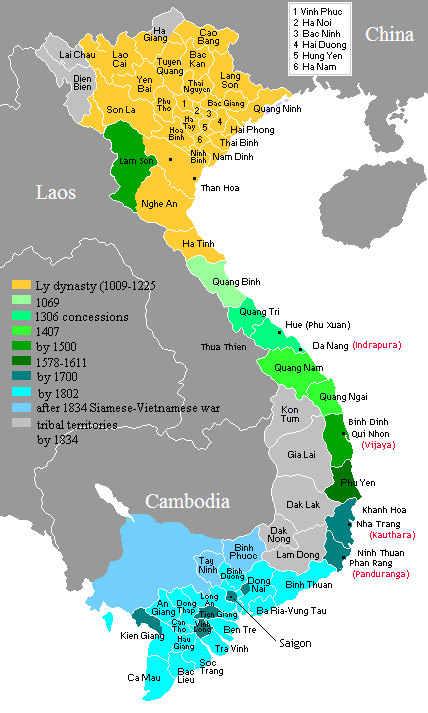
Map showing the southward conquest by the Vietnamese over 900 years.

Towards the end of the 18th century, the Tây Sơn rebellion, led by Nguyễn Nhạc and later Nguyễn Huệ, overthrew the Nguyễn lords and established the Tây Sơn dynasty, but one of its members, Gia Long, by the aid of a French force, in 1801 acquired sway over the whole of present-day Vietnam (Annam, Tongking and Cochinchina). This force was procured for him by Pigneau Monsignor de Béhaine, Titular Bishop of Adran. The Monsignor saw in the political condition of Annam a means of establishing French influence in Indochina and counterbalancing British power in India. Before this, in 1787, Gia Long had concluded a treaty with Louis XVI, whereby in return for a promise of aid he ceded Tourane and Pulo-Condore to the French. That treaty marks the beginning of French influence in Indochina.

After conquering Cochinchina in 1858–1862, the French resumed in 1883 their expansion in Southern Asia. The first protectorate treaty was signed in 1883, although it was replaced the next year by a slightly milder treaty. With the treaty of Tientsin, China recognised the French protectorate over Annam and Tonkin and implicitly abandoned her own claims to suzerainty over Vietnam. Annam and Tonkin became part of French Indochina in 1887. On 9 May 1889, they were split in two Résidences supérieures, each subordinated to the Governor-General of French Indochina. The Nguyễn dynasty still nominally ruled over both protectorates. Tonkin was de facto ruled directly by the French, while the imperial government maintained some degree of authority over Annam. On 27 September 1897, the Vietnamese imperial council in Annam was replaced by a council of ministers, presided de jure by the French representative.

== Geography ==
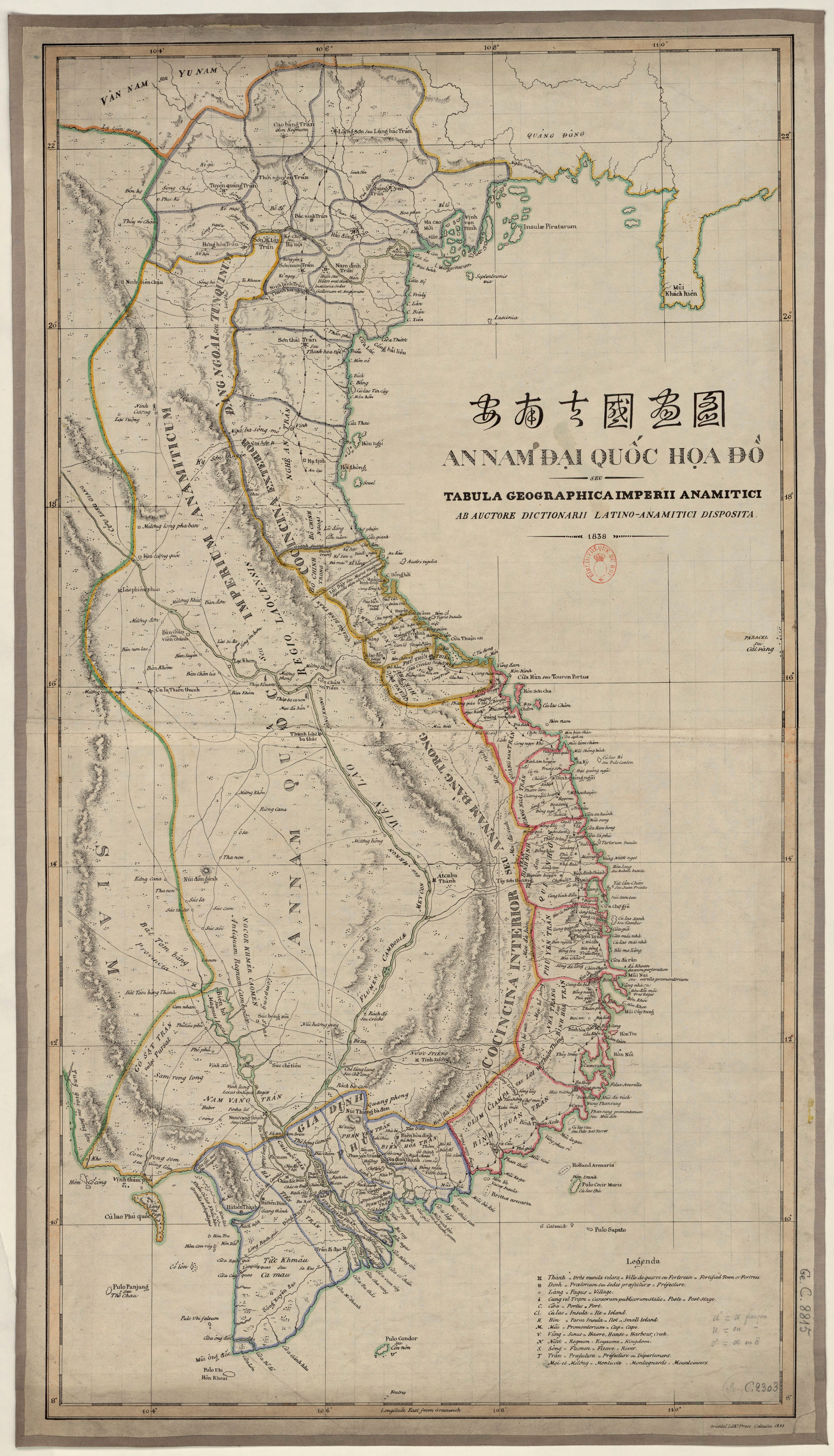
Map of the An Nam Empire by Jean-Louis Taberd.

Annam comprised a sinuous strip of territory measuring between 750 and 800 miles (1,300 km) in length, with an approximate area of 52,000 square miles (130,000 km^{2}). It had a rich, well-watered soil which yields tropical crops, and was rich in naturally occurring minerals.

The country consisted chiefly of a range of plateaus and wooded mountains, running north and south and declining on the coast to a narrow band of plains varying between 12 and 50 miles (80 km) in breadth. The mountains are cut transversely by short narrow valleys, through which run rivers, most of which are dry in summer and torrential in winter. The Song Ma and the Song Ca in the north, and the Song Ba, Don Nai and Se Bang Khan in the south, are the only rivers of any size in the region. The chief harbour is that afforded by the bay of Tourane at the centre of the coastline. South of this point, the coast curves outwards and is broken by peninsulas and indentations; to the north it is concave and bordered in many places by dunes and lagoons.

== Climate ==
In Annam, the rainy season begins during September and lasts for three or four months, corresponding with the northeastern monsoon and also with a period of typhoons. During the rains the temperature varies from 59 degrees Fahrenheit (or even lower) to 75 °F (from 15 degrees Celsius to 24 °C). June, July and August are the hottest months, the temperature often reaching 85 °F (29 °C) or 90 °F (32 °C) or more, though the heat of the day is to some extent compensated by the freshness of the nights. The southwest monsoon which brings rain in Cochin China coincides with the dry season in Annam, probably because the mountains and lofty plateaus separating the two regions retain the precipitation.

== Economy ==
During the French period there was little industry. The economy was an agricultural one based on:

- the cultivation of rice, which grows mainly in the small deltas along the coast and in some districts gives two crops a year.
- fishing, fish salting and the preparation of fish sauce

Silk spinning and weaving were carried on in what the Encyclopædia Britannica Eleventh Edition called "antiquated lines ...silkworms [are] reared in a desultory fashion". Other crops were tea, tobacco, cotton, cinnamon, precious woods and rubber. Coffee, pepper, sugarcane and jute were also cultivated to a minor extent. The exports comprised tea, raw silk and small quantities of cotton, rice and sugarcane. The imports included rice, iron goods, flour, wine, opium and cotton goods. There were coal mines at Nong Son, near Da Nang, and as well as mining of gold, silver, lead, iron and other metals which occur in the mountains. Human trafficking in Annamite women and children to China occurred from the 1870s to the 1940s. Trade, which was controlled by the Chinese, was mostly carried out on the sea, with the chief ports being Da Nang and Qui Nhơn, open to European commerce.

== Administration ==
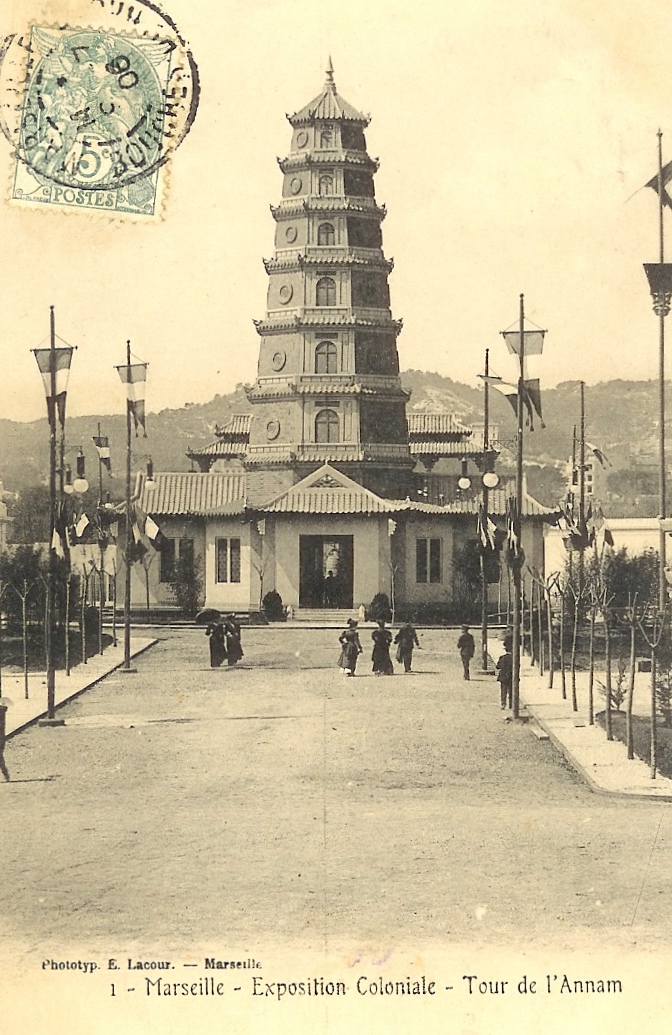
Postcard of the Annam Tower, built in Marseille for the 1906 Colonial Exhibition.

Annam was ruled in theory by its emperor (from the Nguyễn Phúc family, which was also the ruling dynasty of the previous Vietnamese state in the region), assisted by the "comat" or secret council. This council was composed of the heads of the six ministerial departments nominated by the emperor, namely interior, finance, war, ritual, justice, and public works. Formally the four protectorates of French Indochina were ruled by their respective monarchs, but in fact the protectorates were all under the close control of the French senior residents. As a Governor-General of French Indochina, Pierre Pasquier, stated: “The King reigns but the Resident superior rules.” The effective power in the protectorate was in the hands of the resident-superior with both the monarch and the local high officials playing a subordinate role to his office.

The Resident Superior, stationed at Huế, was the representative of France and the virtual ruler of the country. He presided over a council (Conseil de Protectorat) composed of the chiefs of the French services in Annam, together with two members of the "comat"; this body deliberated on questions of taxation affecting the budget of Annam and on local public works. A native governor (Tong Doc or Tuan Phu), assisted by a native staff, administered each of the provinces into which the country was divided, and native officials of lower rank governed the areas into which these provinces were subdivided. The governors took their orders from the imperial government, but they were under the eye of French residents.

Native officials were appointed by the court, but the Resident Superior had power to annul an appointment. The mandarinate or official class was recruited from all ranks of the people by competitive examination. In the province of Tourane (Da Nang), a French tribunal alone exercised jurisdiction, but it administered native law where natives were concerned. Outside this territory the native tribunals survived.

From 1 January 1898, the French directly took over the right to collect all taxes in the protectorate of Annam and to allocate salaries to the Emperor of the Nguyễn dynasty and its mandarins. In a notice dated 24 August 1898, the Resident-Superior of Annam wrote: "From now on, in the Kingdom of Annam there are no longer two governments, but only one" (meaning that the French government completely took over the administration).

== Education ==
During the French period the Confucian-oriented education system was slowly being replaced with a local version of the French education system. Prior to French domination teachers were held in high regard in the Confucian system, and the traditional values of the Vietnamese people include the promotion of learning and high respect for educators. In this old system teachers were deemed to be "only lower than the King" (Emperor) according to a 2010 report by the World Bank. In order to become a teacher in Imperial Vietnam, the mandarins would request that those who applied to become teachers should already have high grades in competitive Confucian-style exams, as well as excellent prior learning achievements. The 2010 report by the World Bank also noted that historically in Vietnam teachers would often be invited to reside together with well-to-do villagers so they would be able to tutor the children of these wealthy families as well as other children that lived in the village.

Immediately after the establishment of the colony of French Cochinchina the French established schools to teach the Vietnamese French and the French Vietnamese in order to train interpreters for the army. In Cochinchina the French immediately began replacing the Nguyễn government apparatus with the French government apparatus and education, and this formed an important part of this process. This education and training system that was established in French Cochinchina initially met the two basic goals that the French had set up in helping to train both interpreters and secretaries for the French military and colonial government, while organising a new form of education for the indigenous population that popularised French words and romanised the local languages, gradually replacing Chinese characters. Despite their efforts French words were not readily adopted, and Chinese script persisted; thus these goals only found limited success in French Cochinchina.

Following the establishment of two protectorates over the Nguyễn dynasty the French expanded the education system they had set up in Cochinchina to the rest of Vietnam. The new French-based education system was created in the hope of training indigenous people that could serve French interests in the colonial system. During the colonial period the French built elementary schools, primary schools, primary colleges, secondary schools, and three universities across Vietnam; all these used mainly the French language for instruction.

Education during the French protectorate period started at the primary school level (Tiểu học / 小學); early childhood education only became a concern in Vietnamese society following the abolition of the Nguyễn dynasty in 1945. During most of the French protectorate period as well as before, early childhood education was not considered to be a social task, and thus there was no formal educational system or curriculum for preschool children.

=== 20th century ===
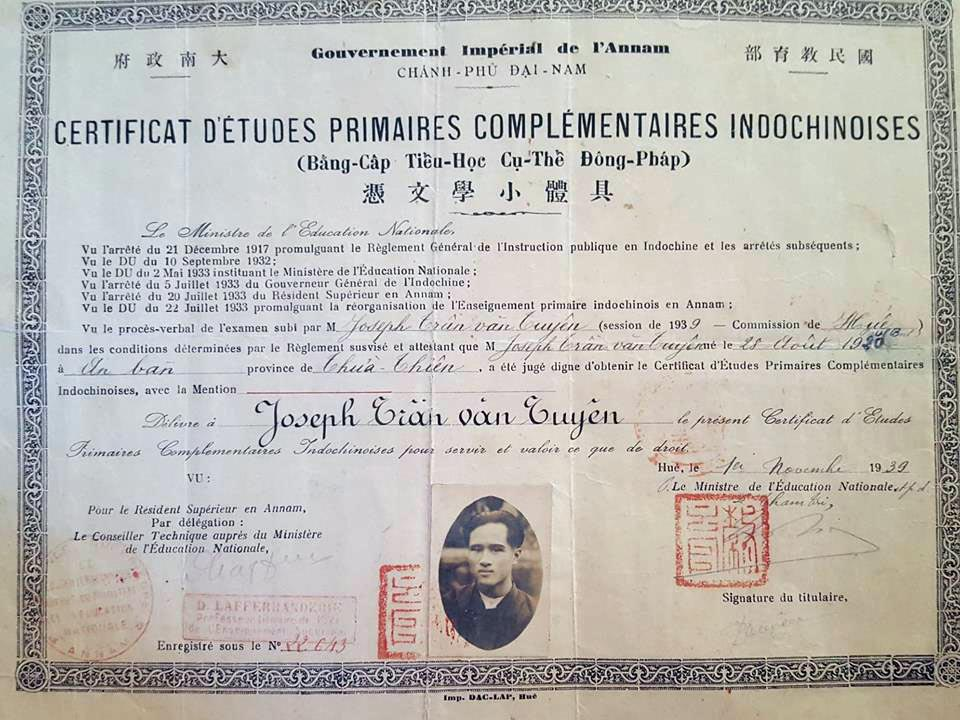
An Indochinese primary school completion certificate (Bằng-Cấp Tiểu-Học Cụ-Thề Đông-Pháp) issued by the National Ministry of Education of the Nguyễn dynasty in the year 1939. It has a modern French design but displays traditional symbols like the seal of the minister, and uses Classical Chinese alongside Romanised Vietnamese.

In 1906, France enacted its first educational reform in French Indochina to expand their influence over the local populations. These reforms were aimed at controlling the spiritual lives of the people and limiting the influence of the Confucian mandarins. The traditional mandarins were seen as a threat to French influence, as they used Confucianism to promote Vietnamese nationalism. The 1906 reforms implemented French at every level. In the 1906 the basic subjects for boys were reading and writing, mathematics, history, geography, morality, and accounting, while the basic subjects for girls were reading and writing, mathematics, morality, hygiene, and housework. Vocational education was also established to train the indigenous population to work for French capitalists as skilled labourers.

Because only a small number of schools were constructed across Vietnam, access to these schools was extremely limited and as much as 95% of the Vietnamese population would remain illiterate during most of the period of French domination, showing the inefficiency of the education system.

In the year 1917 clear educational guidelines were established for French Indochina, and at the primary school and elementary school level Vietnamese classes were given with instructions written in Chữ Quốc Ngữ to replace Chinese characters. The Quốc Ngữ alphabet was used to turn Vietnamese into "a vehicle used to transport French ideology and interests in Indochina".

While apologists for the French colonial regime would claim that French rule led to vast improvements to the Vietnamese education system, the official statistics that were compiled and kept by the French authorities in Indochina cast doubt on such assertions. In 1939 no more than 15% of all school-age children had received any amount of education, while 80% of the general Vietnamese populace still remained illiterate. This was in contrast to pre-colonial times when the majority of the Vietnamese people were at least partly literate.

== See also ==
- List of administrators of the French protectorate of Annam
- List of French possessions and colonies
- Names of Vietnam
