= Phú Xuân, Huế =

Ward in Huế city, Vietnam

Phú Xuân
- Ward
- Country: Vietnam
- Region: North Central
- Centrally- governed city: Huế
- Established: June 16, 2025

Government
  - Type: Ward
  - Body: People's Council of Phú Xuân ward

Area
  - Total: 10.38 km^{2} (4.01 sq mi)

Population (2025)
  - Total: 130,247
  - Density: 12,550/km^{2} (32,500/sq mi)
- Time zone: UTC+07:00

Phú Xuân is a ward in Huế, Vietnam. It is one of 40 wards and communes in the city following the 2025 Vietnamese administrative reforms and this is the most populous ward in Huế city.

== Geography ==
Phú Xuân is a ward in Huế city, Vietnam. It is located 540km south of Hanoi and 640km north of Ho Chi Minh City. It borders with Thuận Hóa ward to the south; Vỹ Dạ, Mỹ Thượng wards to the east; Dương Nỗ, Hóa Châu and Hương An wards to the north and Kim Long ward to the west.

== History ==
On June 16, 2025, the Standing Committee of the National Assembly of Vietnam issued Resolution No. 1675/NQ-UBTVQH15 on the reorganization of commune-level administrative units in Huế city. Phú Xuân ward was established by merging the entire area and population of Gia Hội, Phú Hậu, Tây Lộc, Thuận Lộc and Đông Ba wards (formerly part of Phú Xuân urban district).
