= Hương Điền district =

Former district of South Vietnam

Coordinates: 16.657°N 107.46°E

Hương Điền is a former district of Thừa Thiên province (now Huế city) in South Vietnam. Here, according to North Vietnamese sources was the site of the Huong Dien massacre in July 1955 by Ngo Dinh Diem troops, killing 92 local villagers.

In mid-1972, the Republic of Vietnam Marine Division established its forward command post at Hương Điền.
