= Quảng Điền district =

Quảng Điền District Huyện Quảng Điền
- District
- Location within Vietnam
- Coordinates: 16.578037°N 107.514749°E
- Country: Vietnam
- Region: North Central Coast
- Municipality: Huế
- Capital: Sịa

Area
  - Total: 63 sq mi (163 km^{2})

Population (2003)
  - Total: 91,514
- Time zone: UTC+07:00 (Indochina Time)

Quảng Điền is a former rural district of Huế in the North Central Coast region of Vietnam. It is located in the province's north. The district covers an area of 163 km^{2} and its population was 91,514, as of 2003 . The district capital lies at Sịa.

Aside from the township of Sịa, it has seven communes located on the shores of the Bo river. These are Quảng An, Quảng Thành, Quảng Phước, Quảng Thọ and Quảng Vinh. The other communes are Quảng Thái, Quảng Lợi, Quảng Ngạn, Quảng Công and Quảng Phú. The Bo River runs southwest through the district.
