= Cao Xuân Dục =

Vietnamese scholar, historian, and court adviser (1843–1923)

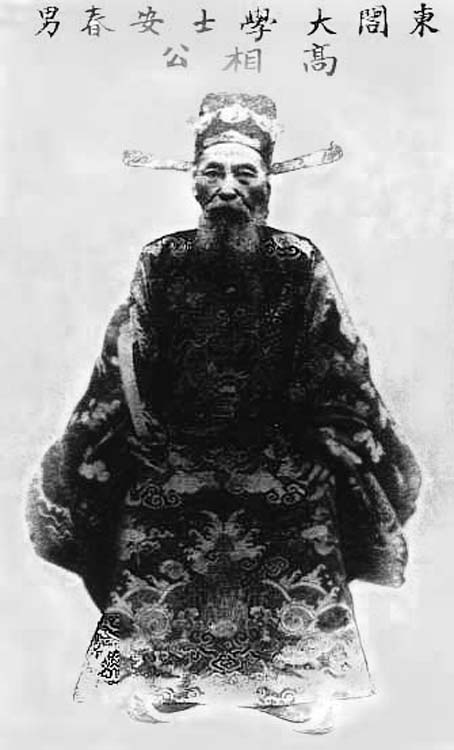
Cao Xuân Dục

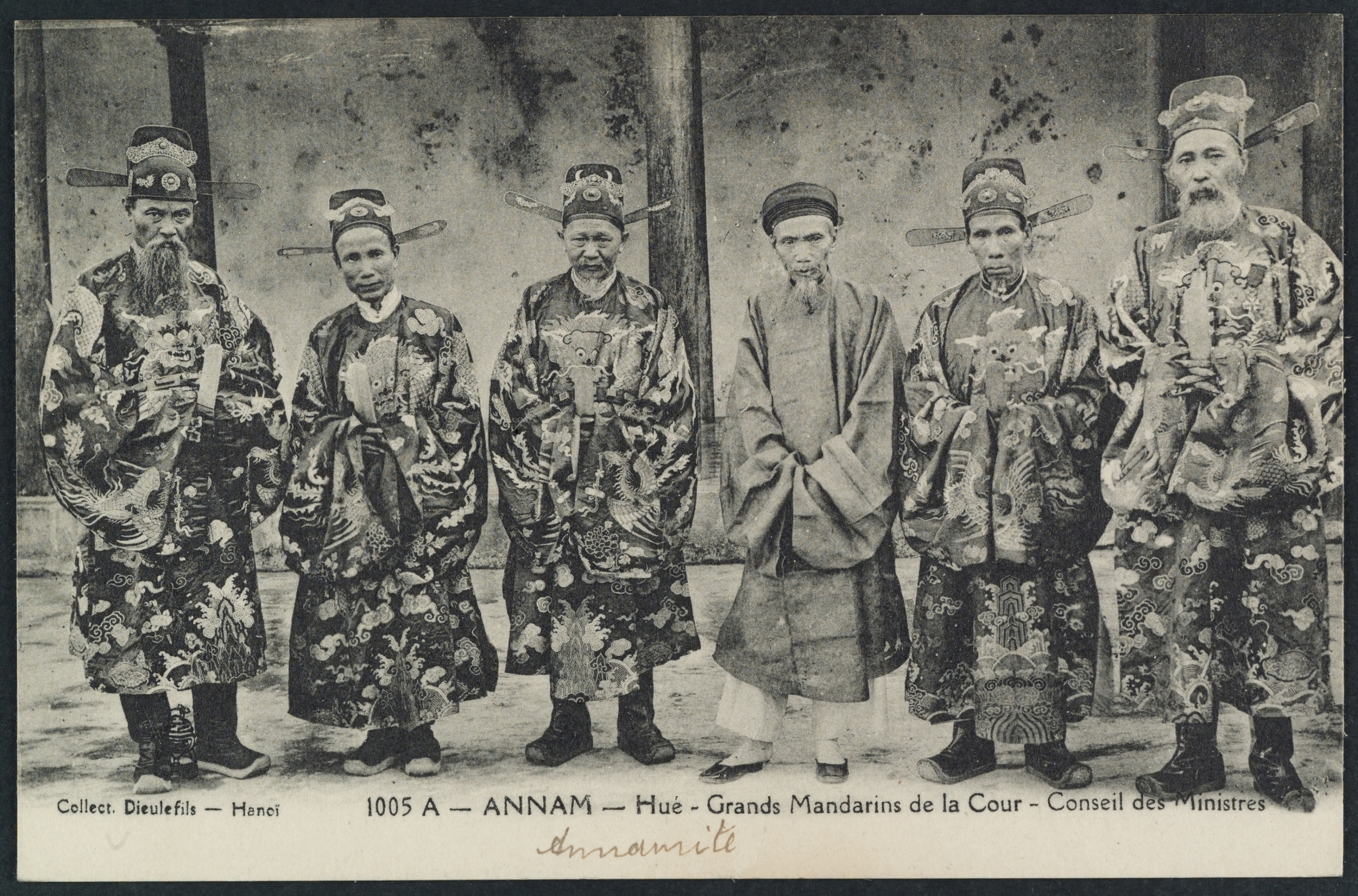
Cabinet ministry of emperor Duy Tân, Minister of Education (Cao Xuân Dục) (left).

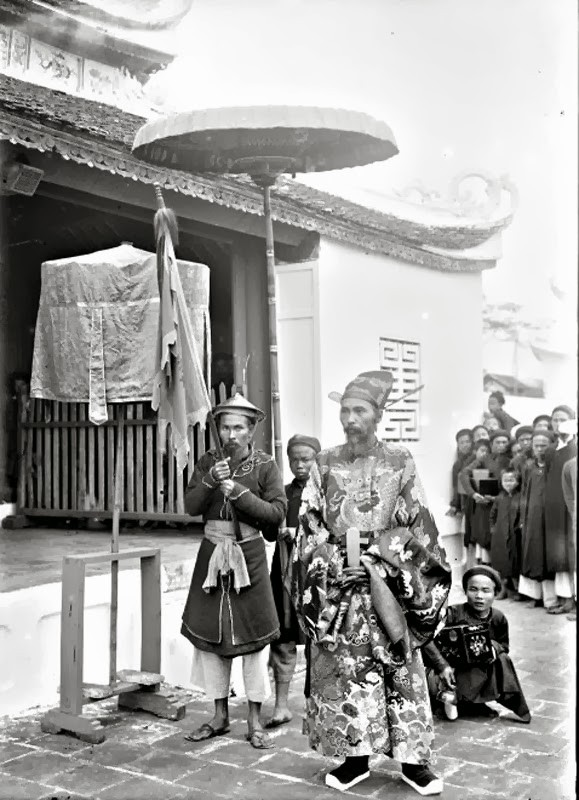
Cao Xuân Dục

Cao Xuân Dục (chữ Hán: 高春育; 1843–1923) was a scholar, historian-mandarin, and court adviser in the Nguyễn dynasty, Vietnam.

== History ==
Cao Xuân Dục was born in Thịnh Mỹ, Diễn Châu, Nghệ An. In 1876, he entered Vietnamese Imperial examination and was awarded the degree of provincial graduate (舉人 - cử nhân), in the same class with the famous anti-French patriot Phan Đình Phùng from Hà Tĩnh.

He served under the Nguyễn Emperors Đồng Khánh and Thành Thái and held several important government posts including Governor-General of Hưng Yên (1889) and minister of education (1907). He was one of the four top advisers to the Emperor during the Vietnam-France conflict in the early 20th century.

When Trương Như Cương (張如岡), a pro-French collaborator, coerced his colleagues to sign a petition to the Thành Thái Emperor to demote him to the position of viceroy (副王, Phó vương), Cao Xuân Dục refused to sign - instead he wrote a quick poem on the petition.

Classical Chinese	Vietnamese transliteration	Vietnamese	English
天無二日 國無兩王 臣高春育 不可記	Thiên vô nhị nhật Quốc vô lưỡng vương Thần Cao Xuân Dục; Bất khả ký	Trời không có hai mặt trời Nước không có hai vua Thần Cao Xuân Dục; Không thể ký	The sky cannot have two suns. A nation cannot have two kings. Your servant Cao Xuân Dục, cannot sign.

Because of that, he was demoted to be the prefect and district magistrate of Quốc Oai district, Hoàng Xá prefecture outside of Hanoi.

A relief of Cao Xuân Dục was sculptured on a wall in a cave in this local region to commemorate his righteousness.

Cao Xuân Dục retired in 1913 to concentrate on building his library, Long Cương Bảo Tàng Thư Viện (named after his pseudonym), collecting and maintaining Vietnamese literature.

A street in Ho Chi Minh City was named after Cao Xuân Dục

== Writings ==
Cao Xuân Dục made significant contribution in maintaining Vietnamese culture and literature in 19th and 20th century. He spent many years writing, collecting, copying, re-writing and preserving valuable books including:

- Annals of Đại Nam
- Quốc triều chính biên toát yếu
- Quốc triều khoa bảng lục - records of biographies of graduates of major imperial exams

== See also ==
- Confucian court examination system in Vietnam
- Nguyễn dynasty
