= Phú Bài =

Phú Bài Phường Phú Bài
- Ward
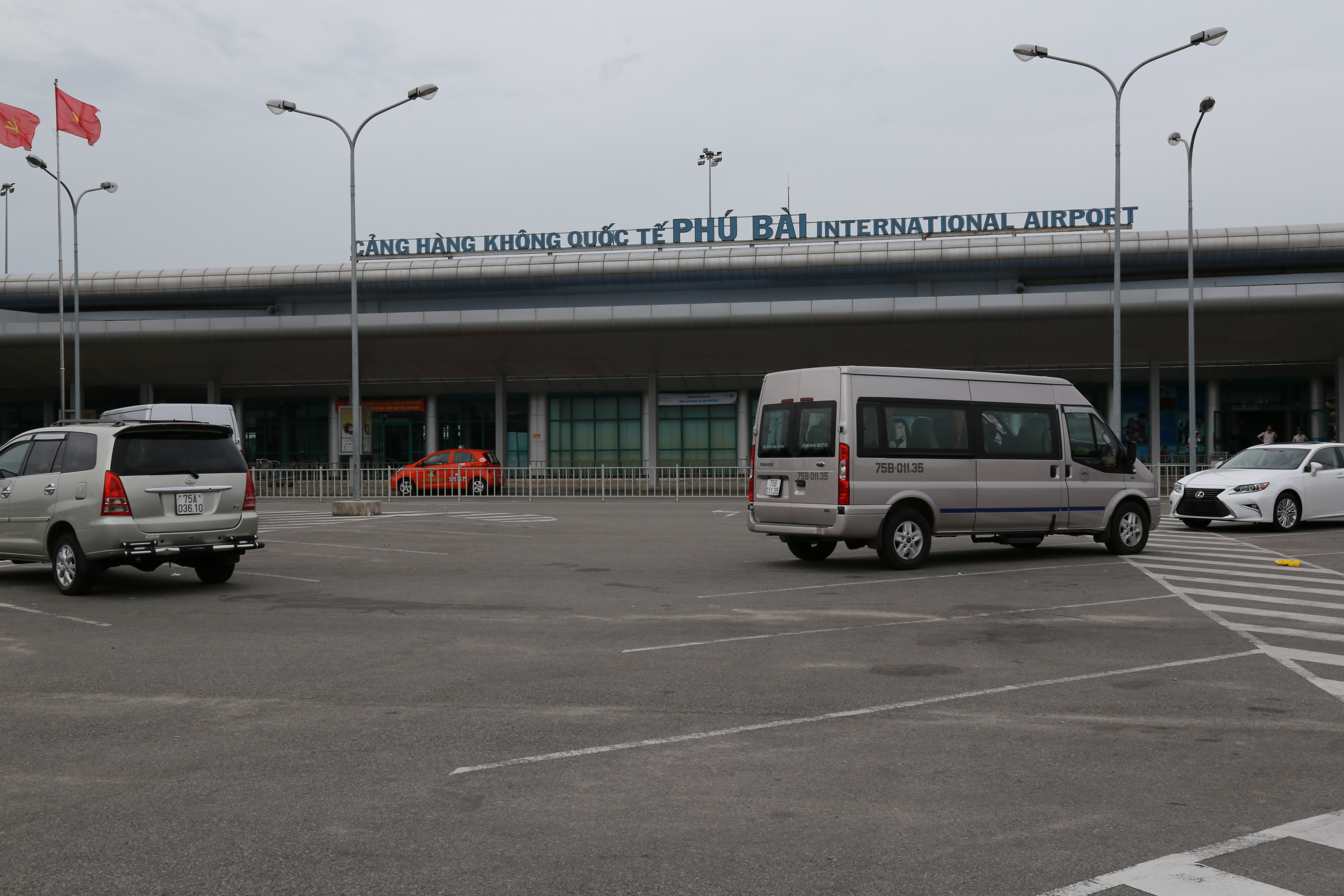
- Phu Bai International Airport

- Location in Vietnam
- Coordinates: 16°24′10″N 107°41′6″E
- Country: Vietnam
- Province: Huế
- Time zone: UTC+07:00 (Indochina Time)

Phú Bài is a ward (phường) of Huế, Vietnam.

== See also ==
- Phu Bai International Airport
- Phu Bai Combat Base
