= Vỹ Dạ =

Coordinates: 16°27′58″N 107°36′17″E

- Ward
- Interactive map of Vỹ Dạ
- Country: Vietnam
- Province: Huế
- Time zone: UTC+07:00 (Indochina Time)

Vỹ Dạ is a ward (phường) of Huế, Vietnam.
