= Thuận Hóa (ward) =

Ward and capital of Huế city, Vietnam

- Ward
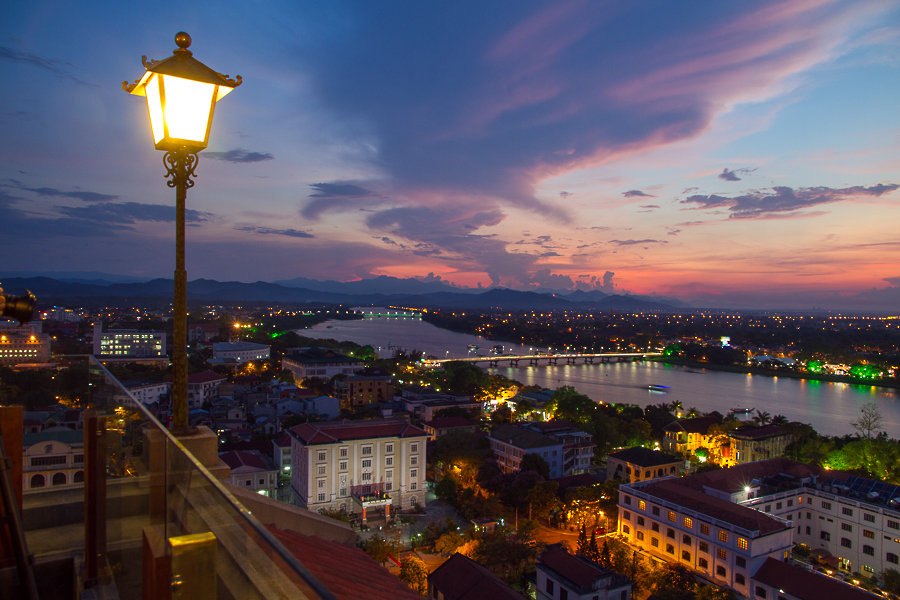
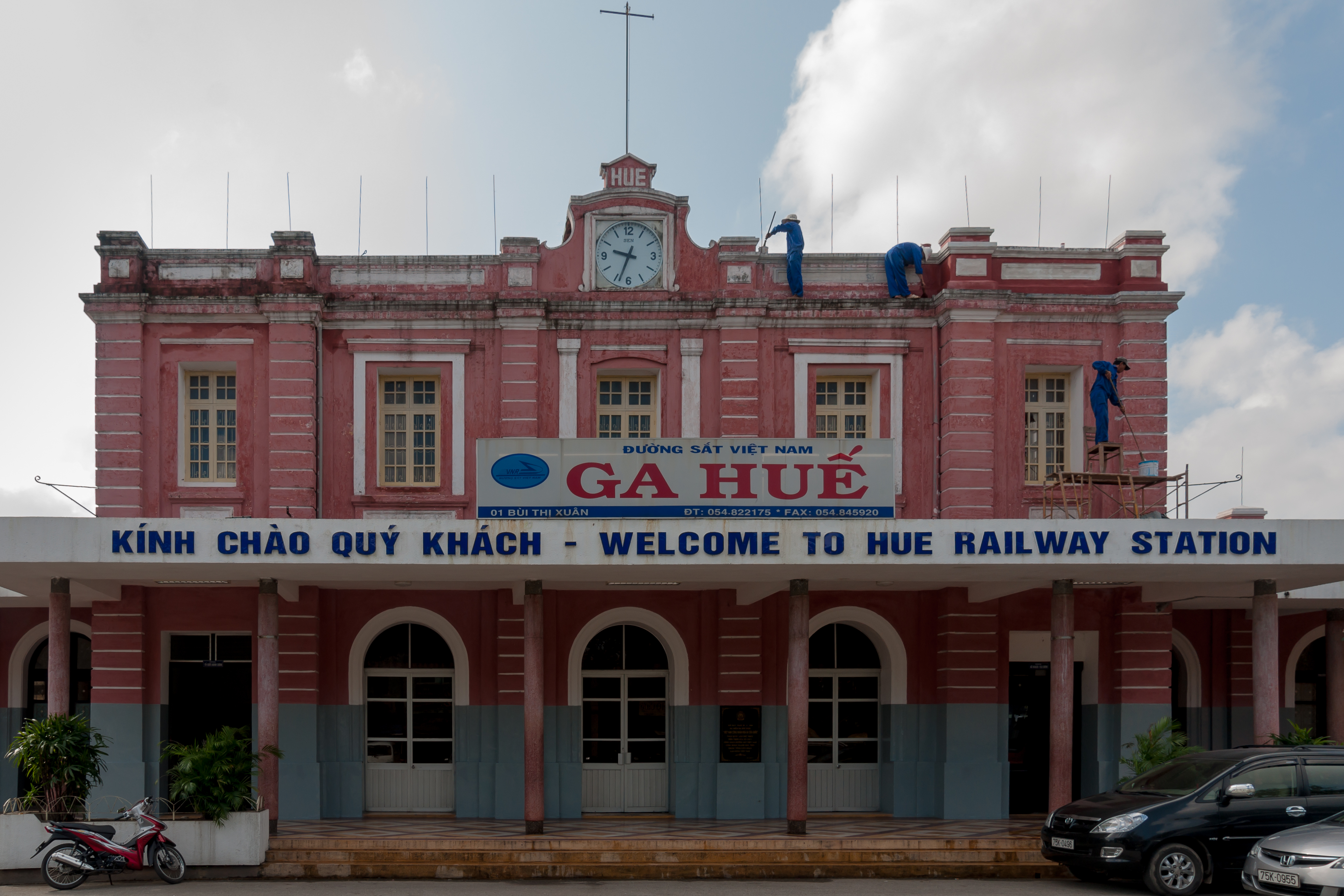
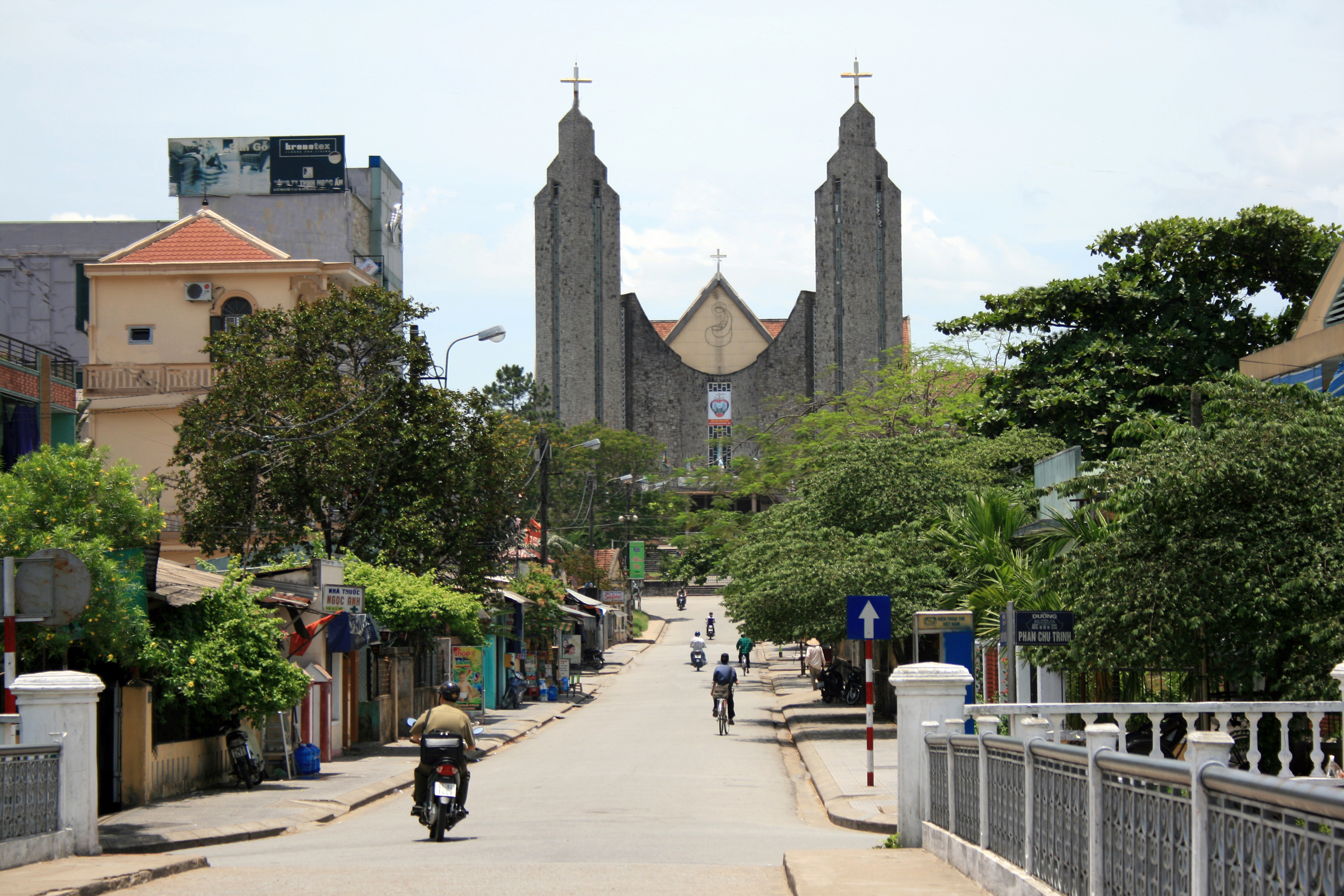
- From top to bottom, from left to right: A view of the ward at night • An Định palace • Huế railway station • Phủ Cam cathedral
- Interactive map of Thuận Hóa
- Country: Vietnam
- Region: North Central
- Centrally- governed city: Huế
- Established: June 16, 2025

Government
  - Type: Ward
  - Body: People's Council of Thuận Hóa ward

Area
  - Total: 7.57 km^{2} (2.92 sq mi)

Population (2025)
  - Total: 98,923
  - Density: 13,100/km^{2} (33,800/sq mi)
- Time zone: UTC+07:00

Thuận Hóa is a ward in Huế city, Vietnam. It is the administrative center of Huế city and one of the 40 wards and communes of the city after the 2025 reorganization.

== Geography ==
Thuận Hóa is a ward in Huế city, Vietnam. It is located 540km south of Hanoi and 640km north of Hồ Chí Minh City. It borders with Kim Long, Phú Xuân and Vỹ Dạ ward to the north; An Cựu ward to the east and southeast; Thủy Xuân ward to the west and southwest.

== Subdivisions ==
Thuận Hóa ward is divided into 30 neighborhoods, numbered from 1 to 30.

== History ==
Before the 20th century, Thuận Hóa ward was the southern part of the Huế Imperial City during the Nguyễn dynasty and belonged to Hương Thủy district.

On December 21, 1945, the President of the Provisional Revolutionary Government of the Democratic Republic of Vietnam signed Decree No. 77, Huế become a town. At that time, the area of what is now Thuận Hóa ward was part of Huế town.

On December 27, 1975, the 5th National Assembly of Vietnam issued a resolution on the merger of Thừa Thiên and Quảng Trị and Quảng Bình provinces into Bình Trị Thiên province. Huế became the provincial city and capital of Bình Trị Thiên province.

After two adjustments and expansions, by early 1977, Huế provincial city had 11 wards. The area of Thuan Hoa ward today roughly corresponds to Vĩnh Ninh, Vĩnh Lợi wards and Thủy Trường, Thủy Phước, Thủy Xuân communes of Huế provincial city.

On July 1, 1989, Bình Trị Thiên province was divided into three provinces: Thừa Thiên Huế, Quảng Trị and Quảng Bình. Huế provincial city is located in Thừa Thiên Huế province.

On January 1, 2025, Huế will become the 6th centrally-governed city of Vietnam. At this point, the area that is now Thuận Hóa ward includes Phú Hội, Phú Nhuận, Đúc, Vĩnh Ninh, Phước Vĩnh and Trường An wards of Thuận Hóa urban district in the new Huế city.

On June 16, 2025, the Standing Committee of the National Assembly of Vietnam issued Resolution No. 1675/NQ-UBTVQH15 on the reorganization of commune-level administrative units in Huế city. Thuan Hoa Ward was established by merging the entire area and population of Phú Hội, Phú Nhuận, Đúc, Vĩnh Ninh, Phước Vĩnh and Trường An (formerly part of Thuận Hóa urban district).
