= Khe Tre =

Commune in Huế city, Vietnam

- Commune
- Interactive map of Khe Tre
- Country: Vietnam
- Region: North Central
- Centrally- governed city: Huế

Government
  - Type: Commune
  - Body: People's Council of Khe Tre commune

Area
  - Total: 256.02 km^{2} (98.85 sq mi)

Population (2025)
  - Total: 12,882
  - Density: 50.316/km^{2} (130.32/sq mi)
- Time zone: UTC+07:00

Khe Tre is a commune in Huế city, Vietnam. It is one of 40 communes and wards in the city following the 2025 Vietnamese administrative reforms.

== Geography ==
Khe Tre is a commune located south of Huế city, 30km south of Thuận Hóa ward. It borders with Phú Bài ward, Nam Đông commune to the west, Hưng Lộc, Lộc An, Phú Lộc commune to the north, Da Nang city to the southeast and south.

== History ==
Prior to 2025, the area that is now Khe Tre commune was formerly Khe Tre commune-level town, Hương Phú, Hương Lộc, and Thượng Lộ communes in Nam Đông district, Thừa Thiên Huế province.

On January 1, 2025, Huế city was established based on the entire Thừa Thiên Huế province. Phú Lộc district was established by merging the entire area and population of Nam Đông district and Phú Lộc district. Khe Tre commune-level town and the communes of Hương Phú, Hương Lộc, and Thượng Lộ belong to Phú Lộc district, Huế city.

On June 16, 2025, the Standing Committee of the National Assembly of Vietnam issued Resolution No. 1675/NQ-UBTVQH15 on the reorganization of commune-level administrative units in Huế city. Khe Tre commune was established by merging the entire area and population of Khe Tre commune-level town and Hương Phú, Hương Lộc, Thượng Lộ communes (formerly part of Phú Lộc district).
