= Vietnam's Green Corridor =

Coordinates: 16°20′N 107°35′E

The Green Corridor project was a four-year initiative that started in June 2004, implemented by the World Wide Fund for Nature (WWF) Greater Mekong Programme and the Thừa Thiên Huế Provincial Forest Protection Department. According to the agreement signed in Huế on May 7, 2004, The Global Environment Facility, the World Wildlife Fund, and the Development Organisation of the Netherlands donated two million US dollars to protect biodiversity in Vietnam. The project also received funding from the US Fish and Wildlife Service, under the Multinational Species Conservation Fund and the Concannon Foundation, for primate surveys and conservation work, as well as the Thừa Thiên Huế Provincial People's Committee. A Green Corridor containing 1,340 square kilometres (520 mi^{2}) of precious forest in the districts of A Lưới, Nam Đông and Hương Thủy of Huế city were better protected with a new method of ensuring higher efficiency.

== New species ==
Eleven new species of animals and plants were discovered in the Green Corridor between 2005 and 2006. These include two butterflies and a snake, as well as five orchids and three other plants, all of which are exclusive to tropical forests in Vietnam's Annamite Mountains. Several large mammal species, including the saola, were discovered in the same forests in the 1990s.

The new snake species, called the white-lipped keelback (Hebius leucomystax), commonly lives by streams where it catches frogs and other small animals. It has a yellow-white stripe that runs along its head and has red dots that cover its body. It can reach about 80 centimetres (31 in) in length.

The butterfly species are among eight discovered in the province since 1996. One is a grass skipper from the genus Zela. The other is a new genus in the subfamily of Satyrinae.

Three of the new orchid species are entirely leafless, which is rare for orchids. They contain no chlorophyll and live on decaying matter. The other new plants include an aspidistra, which produces a flower that is nearly black. A newly discovered aroid species has yellow spathes (aroids often have funnel-shaped spathes surrounding their flowers, which are clustered together on a spadix).

== Species at risk ==
According to the WWF, all of the above species are at risk from illegal logging, hunting, unsustainable extraction of natural resources and conflicting development interests. The Thừa Thiên Huế Province authorities — in particular the Forest Protection Department — have committed to conserving and sustainably managing these valuable forests.

"The area is extremely important for conservation and the province wants to protect the forests and their environmental services, as well as contribute to sustainable development", said Hoang Ngoc Khanh, Director of Thừa Thiên Huế Provincial Forest Protection Department.

Recent surveys have shown that many threatened species are found in the Green Corridor, including 15 reptiles and amphibians and six bird species. The area is also home to Vietnam's greatest number of southern white-cheeked gibbons, one of the world's most endangered primates. The Green Corridor is believed to be the best location in Vietnam to conserve the saola.

== Economic value ==
Forests in the Annamites also help preserve critical environmental services, such as water supplies for thousands of people who depend on the region's rivers. They also provide non-timber forest resources for local ethnic minority groups who earn more than half of their income from these products.
