= Long Quảng =

Commune in Huế city, Vietnam

- Commune
- Country: Vietnam
- Region: North Central
- Centrally- governed city: Huế
- Established: June 16, 2025

Government
  - Type: Commune
  - Body: People's Council of Long Quảng commune

Area
  - Total: 215.85 km^{2} (83.34 sq mi)

Population (2025)
  - Total: 8,883
  - Density: 41.15/km^{2} (106.6/sq mi)
- Time zone: UTC+07:00

Long Quảng is a commune in Huế city, Vietnam. It is one of 40 communes and wards in the city following the 2025 Vietnamese administrative reforms.

== Geography ==
Long Quảng is a commune located south of Huế city, 40km south of Thuận Hóa ward. It borders with Nam Đông commune to the east, Phú Bài ward to the north, A Lưới 5 commune to the west and Da Nang city to the south.

== History ==
On June 16, 2025, the Standing Committee of the National Assembly of Vietnam issued Resolution No. 1675/NQ-UBTVQH15 on the reorganization of commune-level administrative units in Huế city. Long Quảng commune was established by merging the entire area and population of Thượng Quảng, Thượng Long and Hương Hữu communes (formerly part of Phú Lộc district).
