= Nam Châu Hội Quán =

Dining hall

The Nam Châu Hội Quán is a dining hall (hội quán) in Huế, Central Vietnam.

Built in the 19th century, the original Nam Châu Hội Quán was regarded as a cultural institution in Nam Trung village (Huế). The hall used to serve as a meeting place for mandarins of the Nguyễn dynasty (1802–1945) in Tết Nguyên Đán (the Lunar New Year) and traditional festivals.

The present reconstructed Nam Châu Hội Quán is situated between the palace of princess Diên Phước (1824–1848) and the temple of Đức Quốc Công, dedicated to Grand Duke Phạm Đăng Hưng, the maternal grandfather of Emperor Tự Đức (1848–1883). The emperor's mother contributed a great deal to the development of the hall. As time passed by, the hall was severely damaged by wars and harsh climatic conditions.

Huế Tourism Company has invested to develop the hall into a tourist destination in the tourism-culinary-culture zone. Here, tourists can rest, enjoy traditional foods made for festivals and for local residents' daily life, and explore local arts and culture. Nam Châu Hội Quán also serves as a connection place for cultural-historical tourist trips, living-art tourist trips, eco-tourist trips, and trips to visit garden houses, ancient houses, and palaces in Kim Long Ward.
