= Chân Mây – Lăng Cô =

- Commune
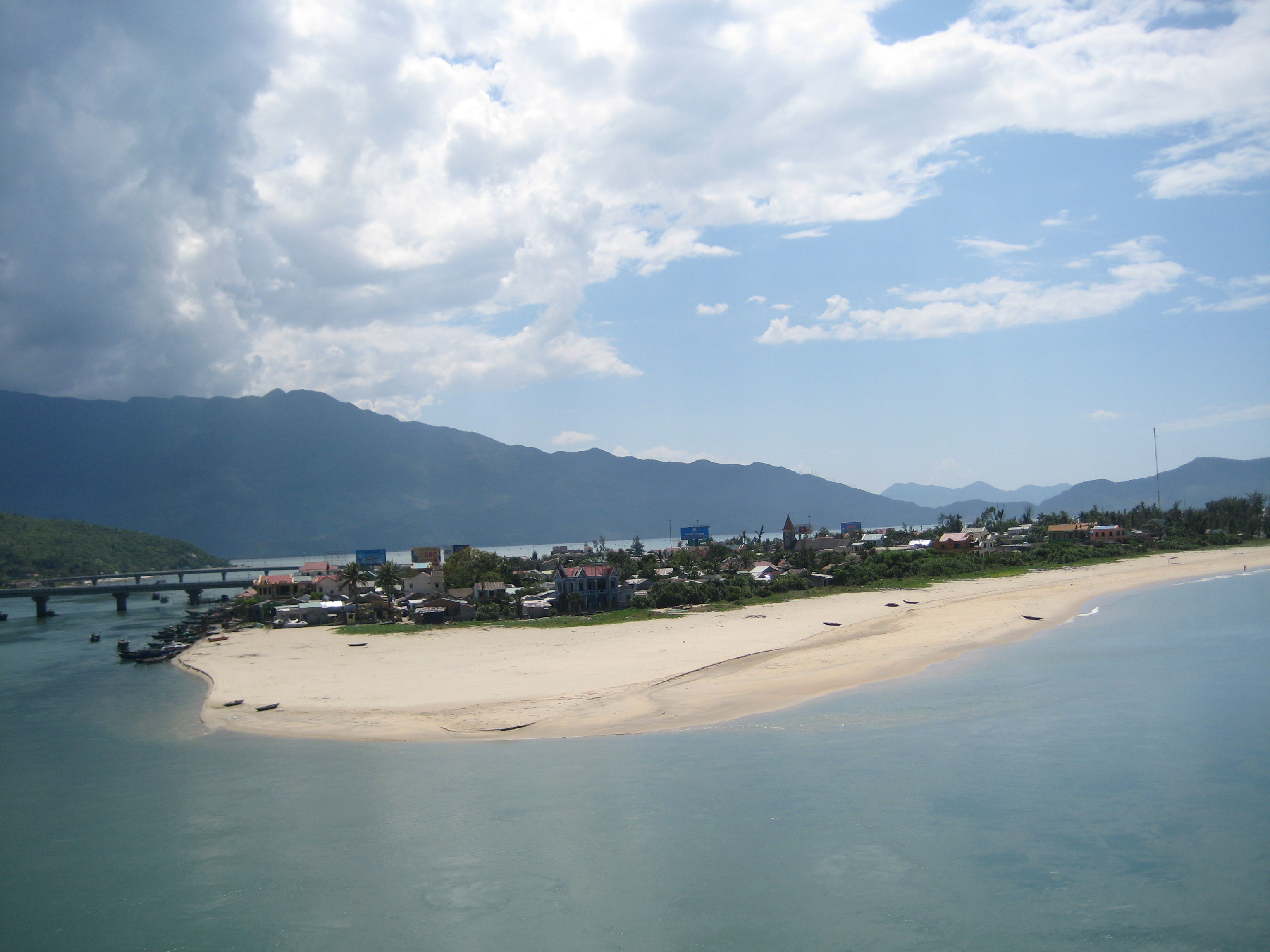
- Lăng Cô Beach

- Location of Lăng Cô
- Coordinates: 16.251°N 108.073°E
- Country: Vietnam
- Province: Huế
- Time zone: UTC+07:00 (Indochina Time)
- Administrative code: 20137

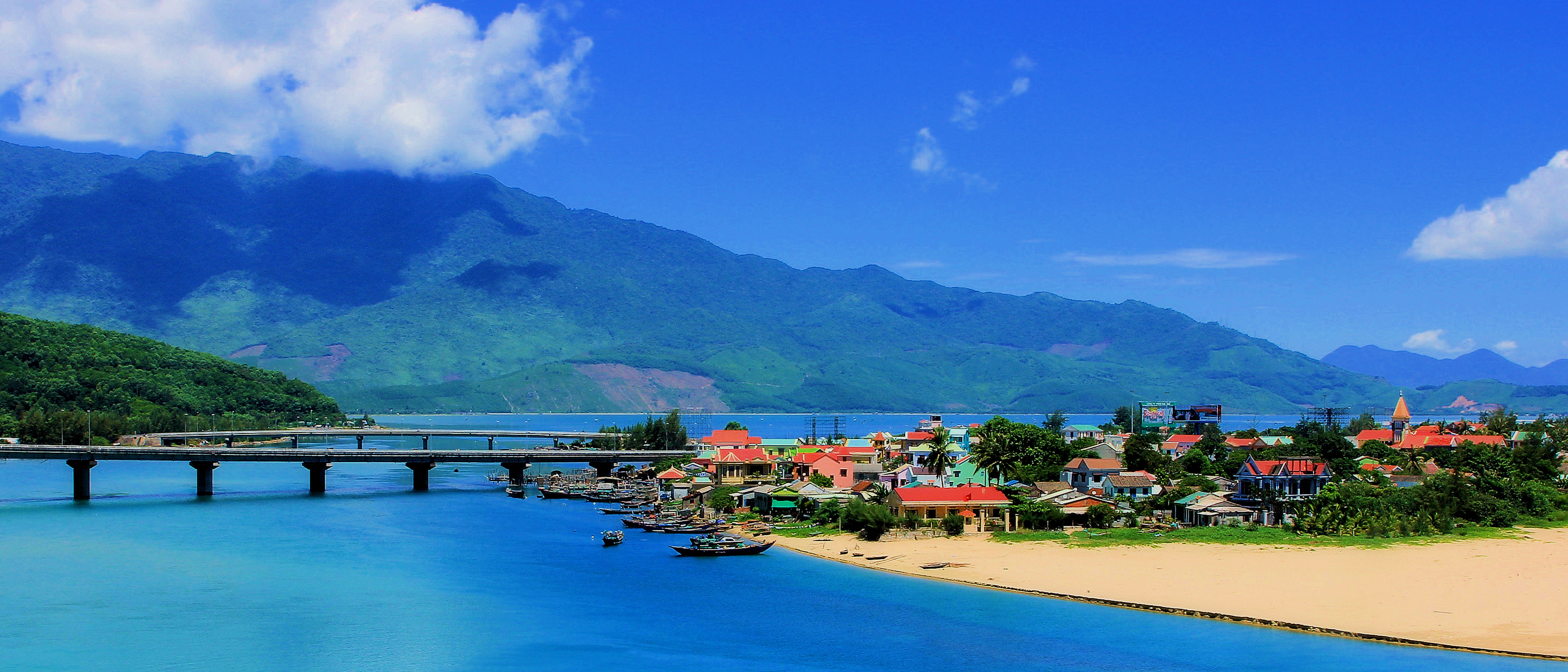
Lang Co Town

Chân Mây – Lăng Cô is a commune (xã) in Huế, Bắc Trung Bộ, Việt Nam. It has a well known beach and resort.

== Administration ==
From July 1st 2026, the commune is divided into 22 villages: Hải Vân, An Cư Tây, Lăng Cô, Đông Dương, An Cư Đông 1, An Cư Đông 2, Lập An, Phú Sơn, Song Thủy, An Lộc, Trung Kiền, Bình An, Bình An 2, Phú Hải, Cảnh Dương, Phước Hưng, Phú Cường Xuyên, An Bàng, Thủy Yên Hạ, Tủy Yên Thượng, Thủy Yên, Thủy Cam.
