= Huế University of Medicine and Pharmacy =

Public university in Huế, Vietnam

- Type: Public university
- Established: 1957
- Parent institution: Huế University
- Academic staff: 259
- Administrative staff: 265
- Location: Huế, Vietnam
- Campus: Urban
- Website: huemed-univ.edu.vn Huemed-univ.edu.vn

Huế University of Medicine and Pharmacy (Vietnamese: Trường Đại học Y Dược, Đại học Huế) is a public university in Huế, Vietnam. It was founded on March 28, 1957. The university, classified as a national key university of Vietnam, is a member of Huế University system.
