= Huế =

Centrally-governed city of Vietnam

- Centrally-governed city
- Thành phố Huế
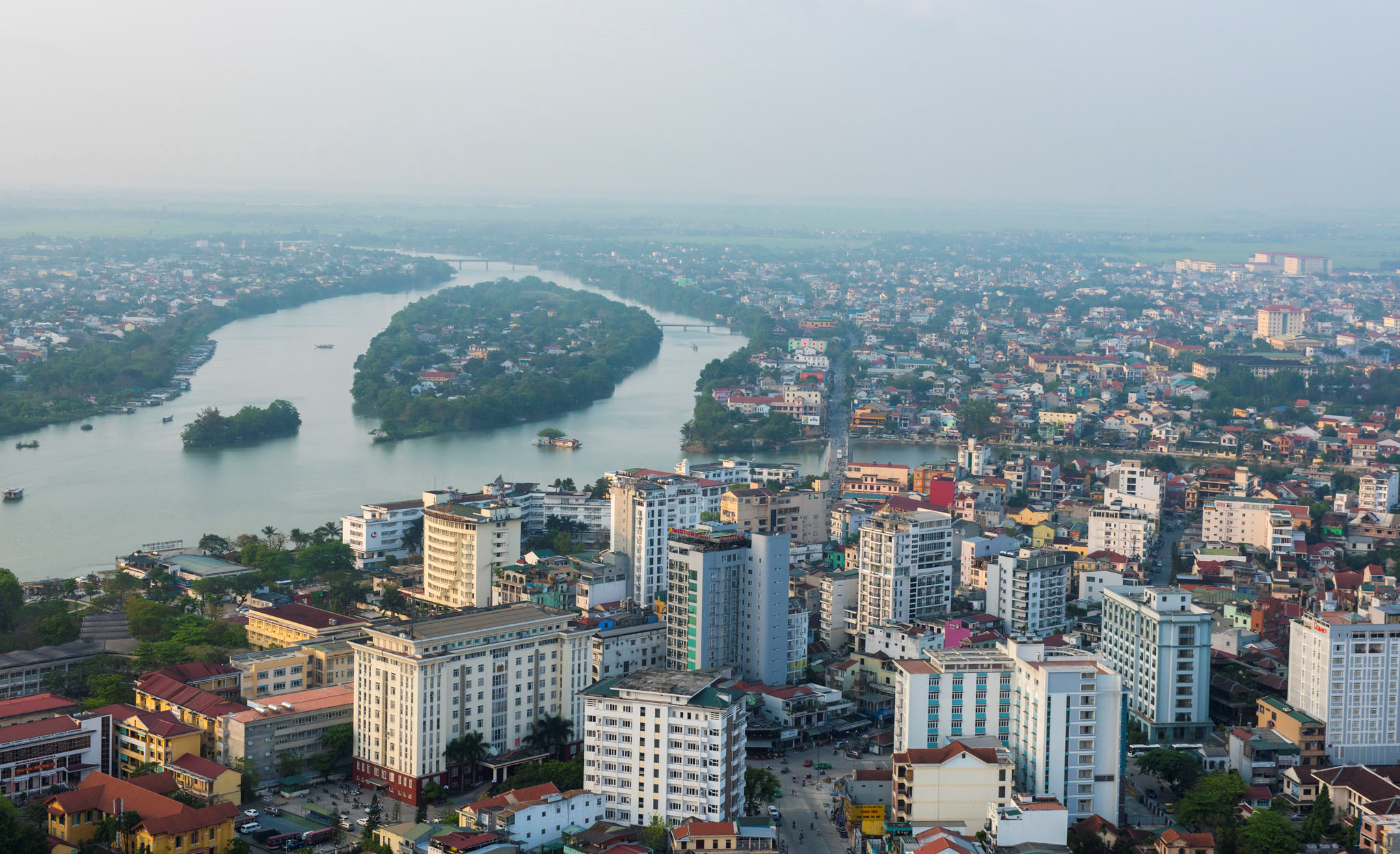
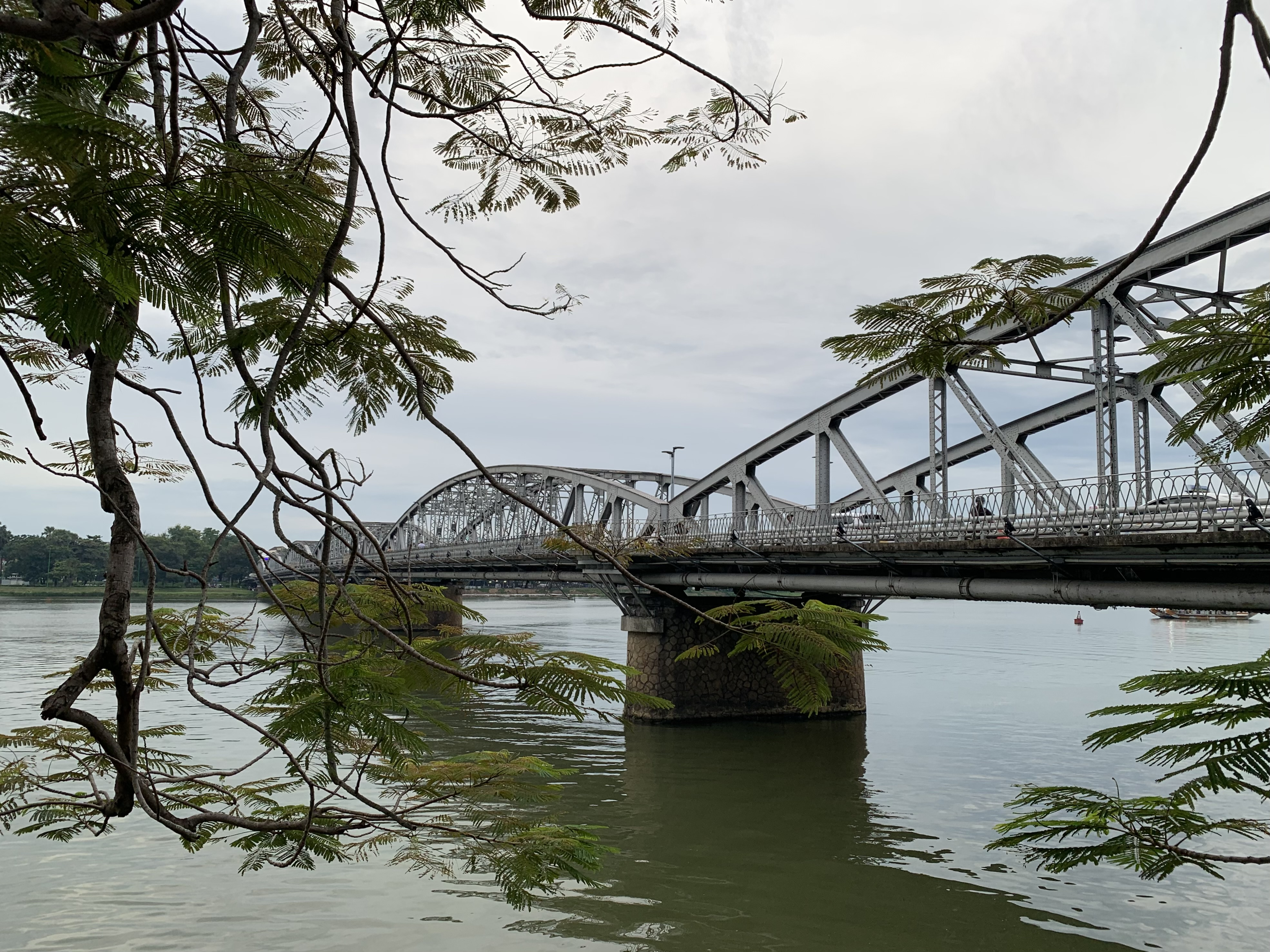
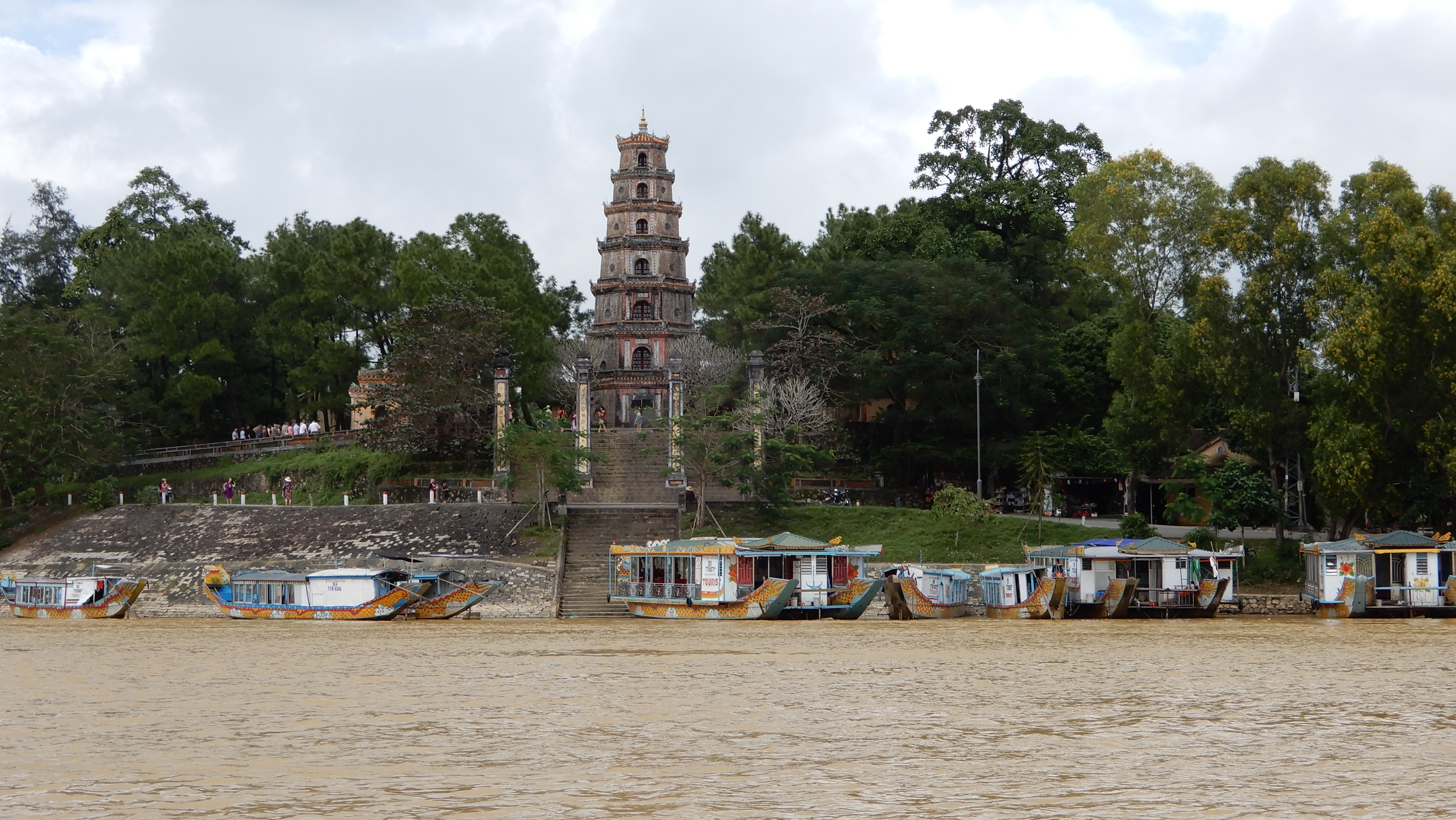
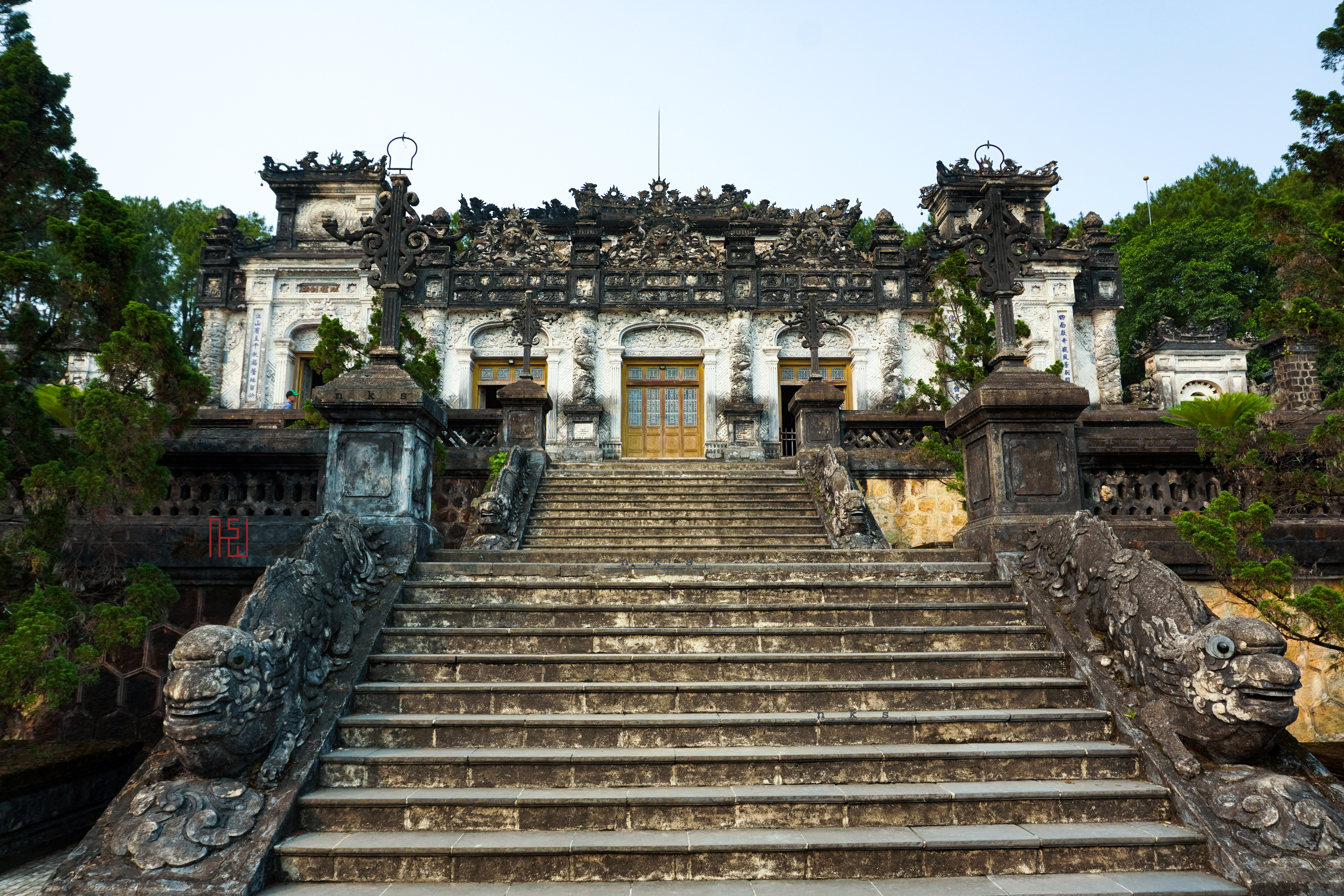
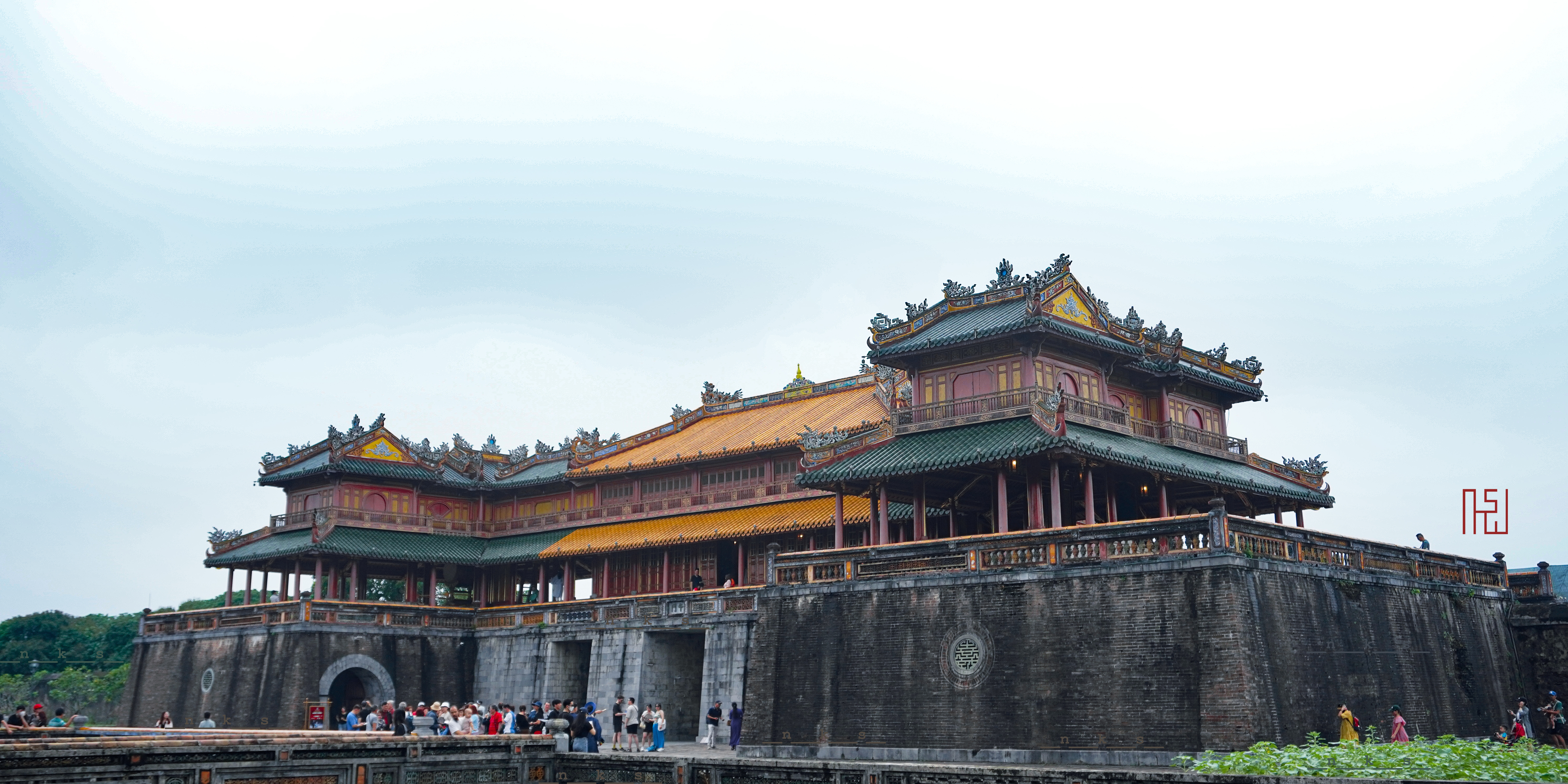
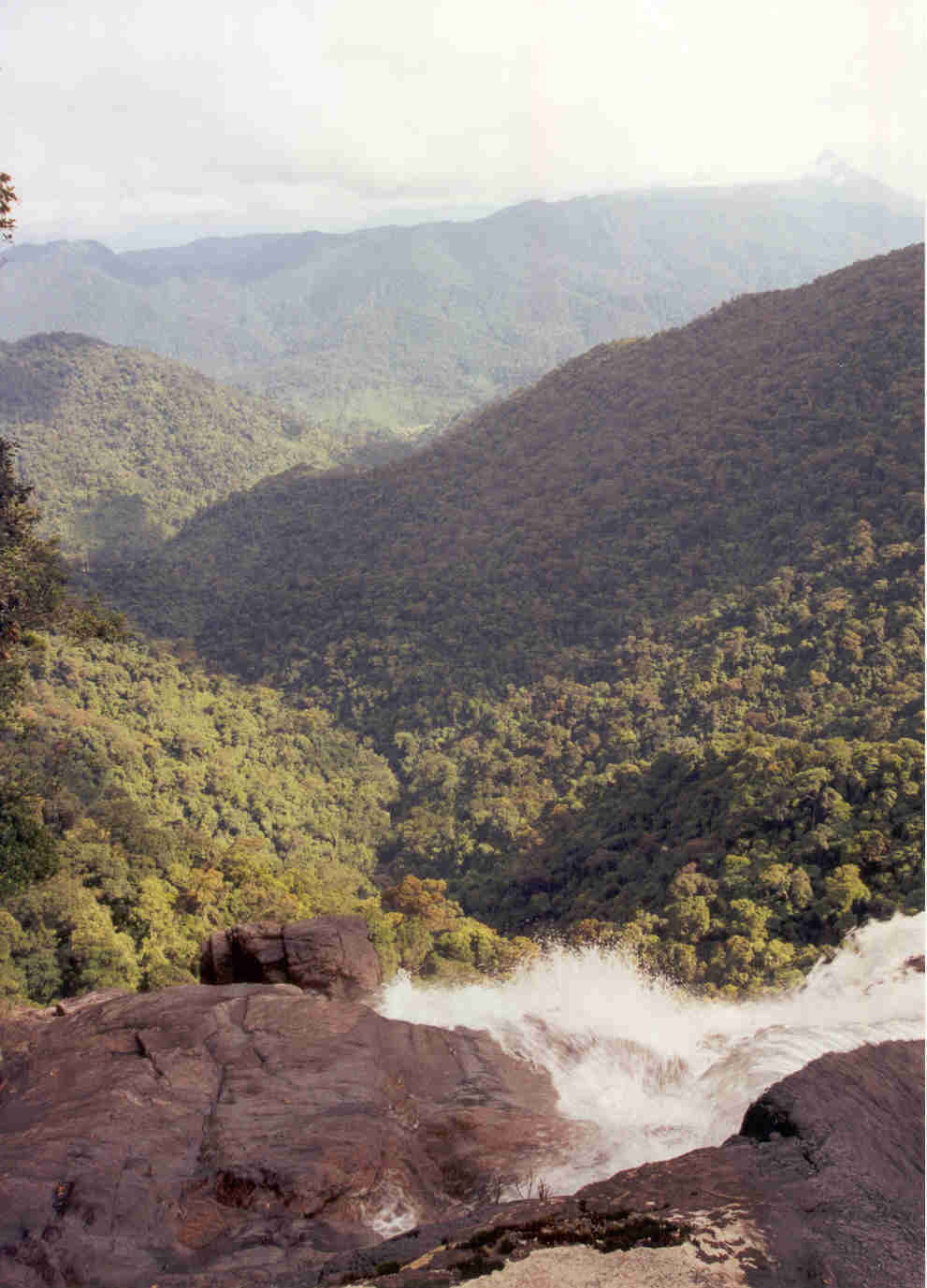
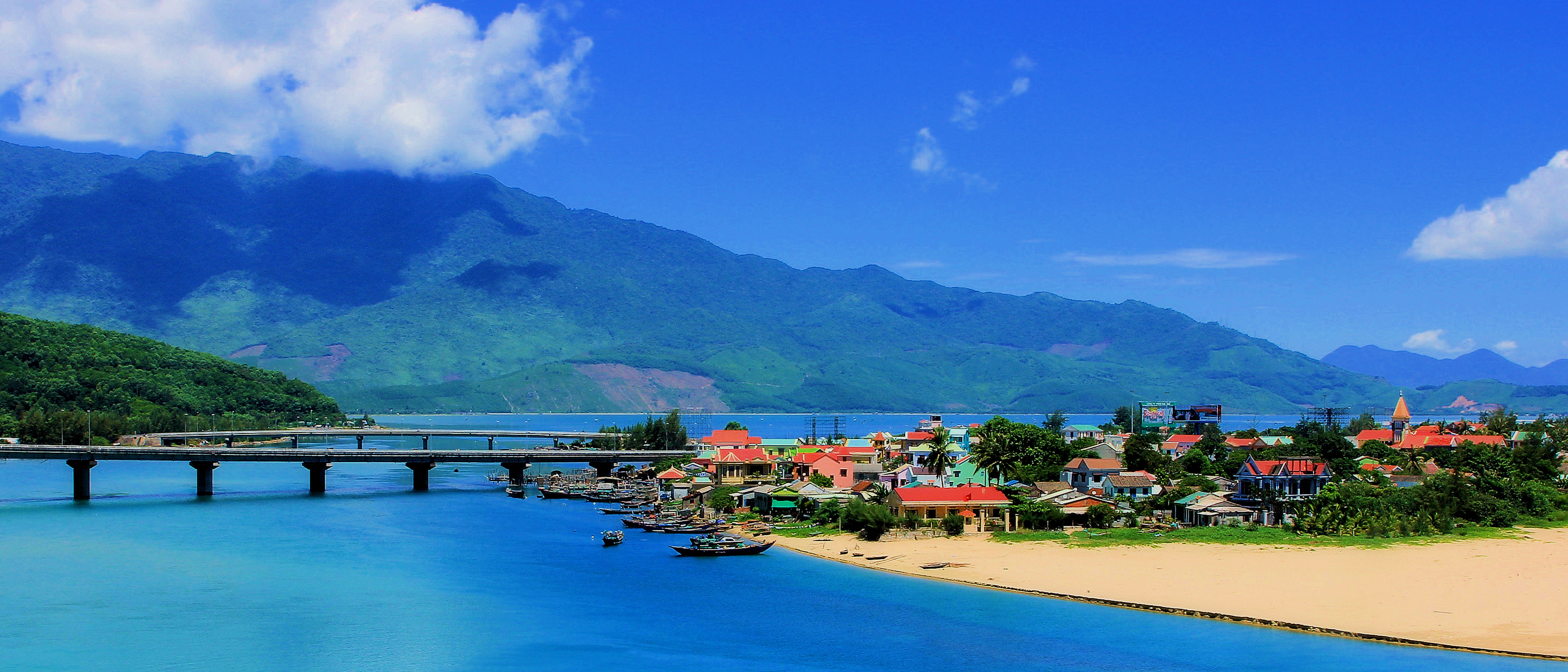
- Aerial view of Huế Trường Tiền Bridge and Hương River Thiên Mụ Temple Tomb of Khải Định Imperial City of Huế Bạch Mã Lăng Cô

- Seal
- Nicknames: City of Romance, Festival City
- Location of Huế within Vietnam
- Interactive map of Huế
- Coordinates: 16°27′50″N 107°35′12″E
- Country: Vietnam
- Region: North Central
- Capital: Thuận Hóa ward
- Subdivisions: 21 wards; 19 communes

Government
  - Body: Huế People's Council
  - Party Secretary: Nguyễn Đình Trung
  - People's Council Chair: Lê Trường Lưu
  - People's Committee Chair: Nguyễn Khắc Toàn

Area
  - Total: 4,947.11 km^{2} (1,910.09 sq mi)
- Elevation: 24 m (79 ft)

Population (2024)
  - Total: 1,578,600
  - Density: 319.10/km^{2} (826.45/sq mi)
  - Urban: 1,040,800
  - Rural: 537,800

Demographics
  - Ethnicities: Vietnamese, Chăm, Tà Ôi, Cơ Tu, Bru, Thái
- Time zone: UTC+7 (ICT)
- Postal code: 49xxx
- Area codes: 234
- ISO 3166 code: VN-26
- HDI (2020): ▲0.704 (34th)
- Website: hue.gov.vn

Huế, (Note: Vietnamese: [hwě]) formerly Thừa Thiên Huế province, (Note: Vietnamese: [t̺ʰɯə̀ t̺ʰiə̄n hwě]) is a centrally-governed city in central Vietnam, located approximately at the center of the country, and an cultural, educational, and medical hub. It borders Quảng Trị to the north, Đà Nẵng to the south, Salavan and Sekong of Laos to the west and the South China Sea to the east. As one of the country's nine centrally-governed cities, it falls under the administration of the central government.

Huế has 128 km of coastline, 22,000 ha of lagoons and over 200,000 ha of forest. The city is located in the middle of the North Central and South Central regions (including the South Central Coast and Central Highlands), and is transitional in geology, climate, administrative division, and local culture.

Huế was historically part of Thuận Hóa, a territory ceded by Champa to Đại Việt in 1306 as a wedding dowry. Huế (then known as Phú Xuân) became the provincial capital in 1687, the capital of Đàng Trong from 1738 to 1775, and the capital of Vietnam under the Nguyễn dynasty from 1802 to 1945. The city served as the Imperial Citadel and administrative capital of the Nguyễn dynasty, and later also functioned as capital of the protectorate of Annam during the colonial French Indochina period. Huế is a tourist destination with its UNESCO-designated complex of imperial palaces, tombs and temples. Alongside its moat and stone walls, the complex encompasses the Imperial City of Huế, with palaces and shrines; the Forbidden Purple City, once the emperor's home; a replica of the Royal Theater; and temples and monuments in the city's outskirts.

== Etymology ==
There are no sources of information that definitively confirm when the place name Huế officially appeared, and according to some information:

- It is possible that Emperor Lê Thánh Tông of the Lê dynasty was the first to mention the place name Huế in Thập giới cô hồn quốc ngữ văn, a literature written in Chữ Nôm. In the literature, there is a line: “Hương kỳ nam, vảy đồi mồi, búi an tức, bì hồ tiêu, thau Lào, thóc Huế, thuyền tám tầm chở đã vạy then [Sandalwood incense, tortoiseshell scales, An Tức cloth, pepper hides, Lao bronze, Huế rice, an eight-fathom boat with a worn rudder].”
- Older historical documents, with the exception of Quốc Triều Chính Biên Toát Yếu, used the name Phú Xuân, Kinh Đô, or simply Kinh, rather than the name Huế, when referring to Huế.
- Việt Nam sử lược by Trần Trọng Kim was the first Vietnamese history book written in Chữ Quốc Ngữ. In addition to traditional historical sources, Trần Trọng Kim utilized Western historical sources, and the name Huế appeared.
- In the memoir of Pierre Poivre, a French merchant who visited Phú Xuân (Huế) in 1749, the name Huế in the form of Hué appeared on occasions.
- In 1787, Le Floch de la Carrière drew a map of the Đàng Trong coast for the French Navy, in which the map of Huế was depicted, and the name Huế was recorded as the French would later write it: Hué.
- In a letter written in Saigon on July 15, 1789, by Oliver de Puynamel to Létodal in Macau, the name Hué was mentioned twice when discussing the situation there.

== History ==
The oldest ruins in Huế belong to the Kingdom of Lâm Ấp, dating back to the 4th century AD. The ruins of its capital, the ancient city of Kandarpapura (lit. 'the city where Śiva burnt Kama'), is later located in Long Tho Hill, three kilometers to the west of the city. Kandarpapura might have only been established during the reign of Kandarpadharma (r. 629–640) and it was named after the king, certainly it may be not the name of the capital of former Lâm Ấp kingdom. Another Champa ruin in the vicinity, the ancient city of Hoa Chau is dated back to the 9th century.

In 1306, the King of Champa, Chế Mân offered Vietnam two Cham prefectures, Ô and Lý, in exchange for marriage with a Vietnamese (Trần dynasty) princess named Huyền Trân. The Vietnamese King Trần Anh Tông accepted this offer. He took and renamed Ô and Lý prefectures to Thuận prefecture and Hóa prefecture, respectively, the two being often referred collectively to as Thuận Hóa region.

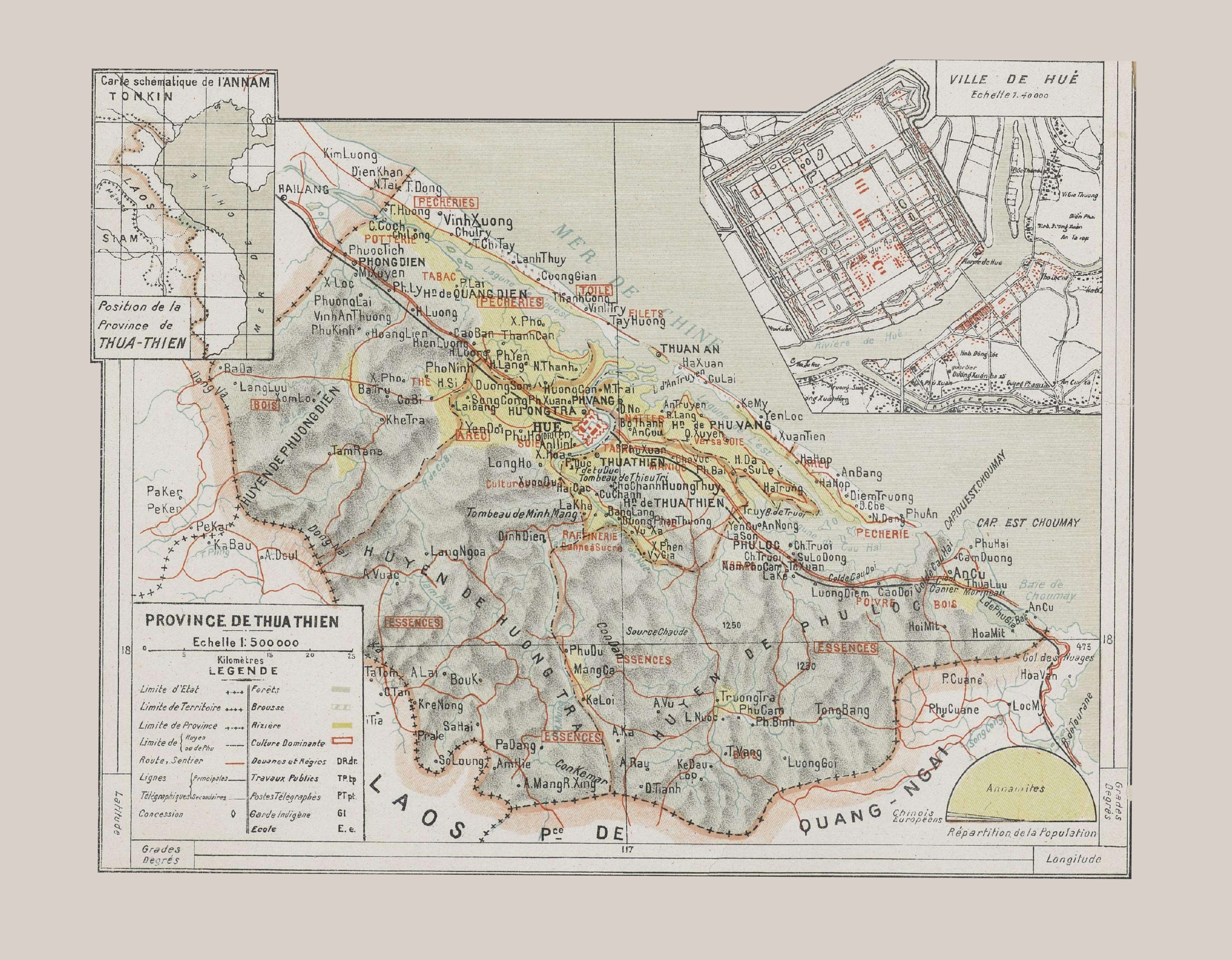
Map of Thua Thien province in 1909

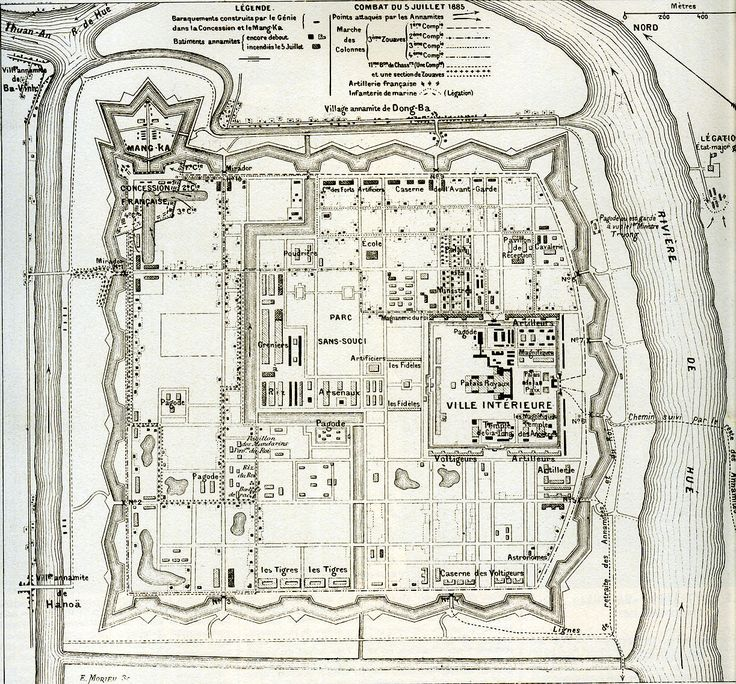
Map of Huế citadel in 1885

In 1592, the Mạc dynasty was forced to flee to Cao Bằng province and the Lê emperors were enthroned as de jure Vietnamese rulers under the leadership of Nguyễn Kim, the leader of Lê dynasty loyalists. Later, Kim was poisoned by a Mạc dynasty general which paved the way for his son-in-law, Trịnh Kiểm, to take over the leadership. Kim's eldest son, Nguyen Uông, was also assassinated in order to secure Trịnh Kiểm's authority. Nguyễn Hoàng, another son of Nguyễn Kim, feared a fate like Nguyễn Uông's so he pretended to have a mental illness. He asked his sister Ngoc Bao, who was a wife of Trịnh Kiểm, to entreat Trịnh Kiểm to let Nguyễn Hoàng govern Thuận Hóa, the furthest south region of Vietnam at that time. Because Mạc dynasty loyalists were revolting in Thuận Hóa, and Trịnh Kiểm was busy fighting the Mạc dynasty's forces in northern Vietnam during this time, Ngoc Bao's request was approved, and Nguyễn Hoàng went south. After Hoàng pacified Thuận Hóa, he and his heir Nguyễn Phúc Nguyên secretly made this region loyal to the Nguyễn family; then they rose against the Trịnh lords. Vietnam erupted into a new civil war between two de facto ruling families: the clan of the Nguyễn lords and the clan of the Trịnh lords.

Thuận Hóa and Phú Xuân became the location of the Đại Việt kingdom once Nguyễn Hoàng was appointed head of Thuận Hóa (1511–1558). Lord Nguyễn Hoàng (1558–1613) established bases at Ai Tu, Tra Bat and Dinh Cat, while his lords moved palaces to Kim Long (1636), where they would eventually base their operations in Phú Xuân (1687). The Nguyễn lords ruled the area until the Trinh clan conquered it in 1775.

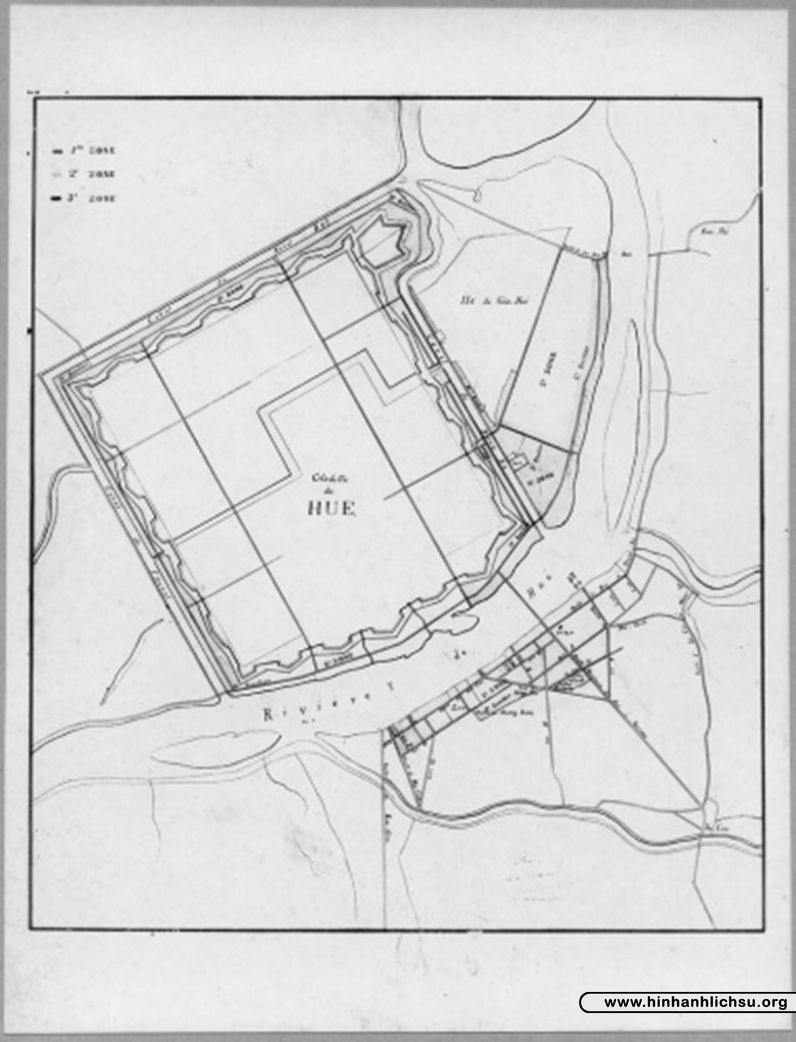
Drawing of Huế citadel in the Nguyễn dynasty in the early 20th century.

Tây Sơn rebellions broke out in 1771 and occupied an area from Quy Nhon to Bình Thuận province, thereby weakening the authority and power of the Nguyễn lords. While the war between Tây Sơn rebellion and Nguyễn lord was being fought, the Trịnh lords sent south an army and captured Phú Xuân in 1775. After the capture of Phú Xuân, the Trịnh lords' general Hoàng Ngũ Phúc made a tactical alliance with Tây Sơn and withdrew almost all troops to Tonkin and left some troops in Phú Xuân. In 1786, Tây Sơn rebellion defeated the Trịnh garrison and occupied Phú Xuân.

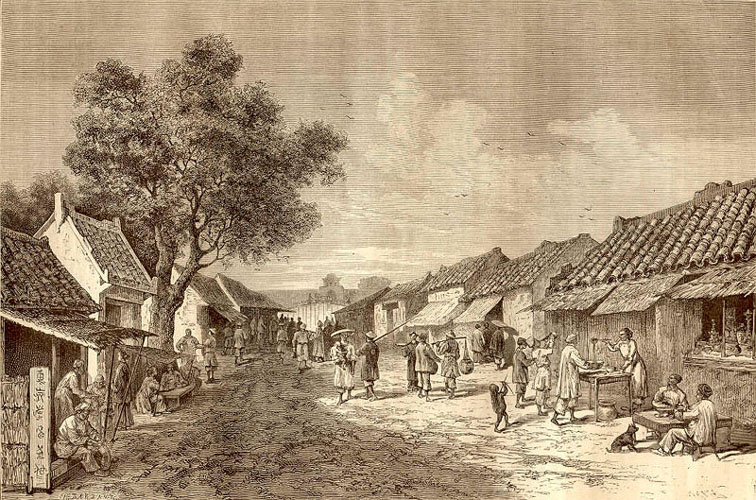
Hue City in 1875

In 1802, Nguyen Ánh, a successor of the Nguyễn lords, recaptured Phú Xuân and unified the country. Nguyễn Ánh rebuilt the citadel entirely and made it the Imperial City capital of all of Vietnam. Nguyễn Phúc Ánh (later Emperor Gia Long) succeeded in establishing his control over the whole of Vietnam, thereby making Huế the national capital.

The second emperor of the Nguyễn dynasty to rule from Huế, reigning from his birthday on 14 February 1820 until his death, on 20 January 1841 was Minh Mạng. He was a younger son of Emperor Gia Long, whose eldest son, Crown Prince Cảnh, had died in 1801. Minh Mạng was known for his opposition to French involvement in Vietnam, and for his rigid Confucian orthodoxy.

After the French conquest of Vietnam, Phú Xuân was officially renamed to Huế in 1899. It remained the capital of Annam, one of French Indochina's six constituent regions, until the State of Vietnam was established in 1949. Prior to 1975, the province was known simply as Thừa Thiên. During the French colonial period, Huế was in the protectorate of Annam. It remained the seat of the Imperial Palace until 1945, when Emperor Bảo Đại abdicated and the Democratic Republic of Vietnam (DRV) government was established with its capital at Ha Noi (Hanoi), in the north.

While Bảo Đại was proclaimed "Head of the State of Vietnam" with the help of the returning French colonialists in 1949 (although not with recognition from the communists or the full acceptance of the Vietnamese people), his new capital was Saigon, in the south.

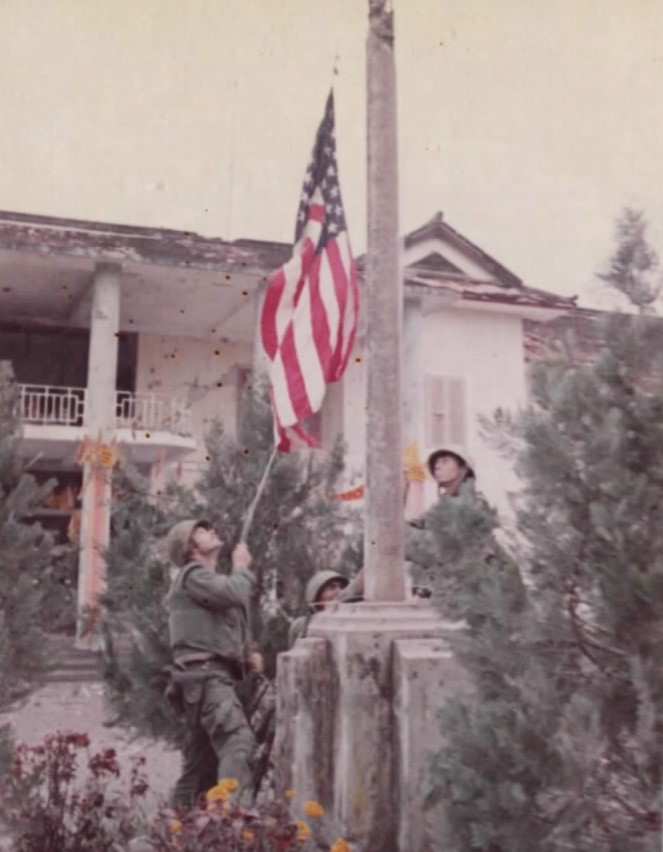
The United States Marine Corps raise the US flag in Huế

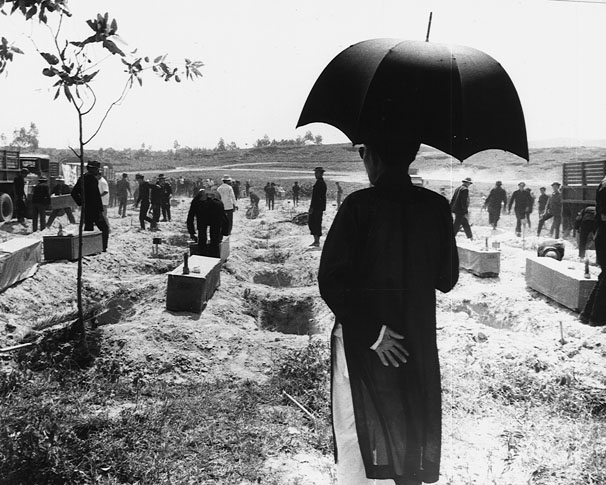
Burial of 300 unidentified victims during the Massacre at Huế

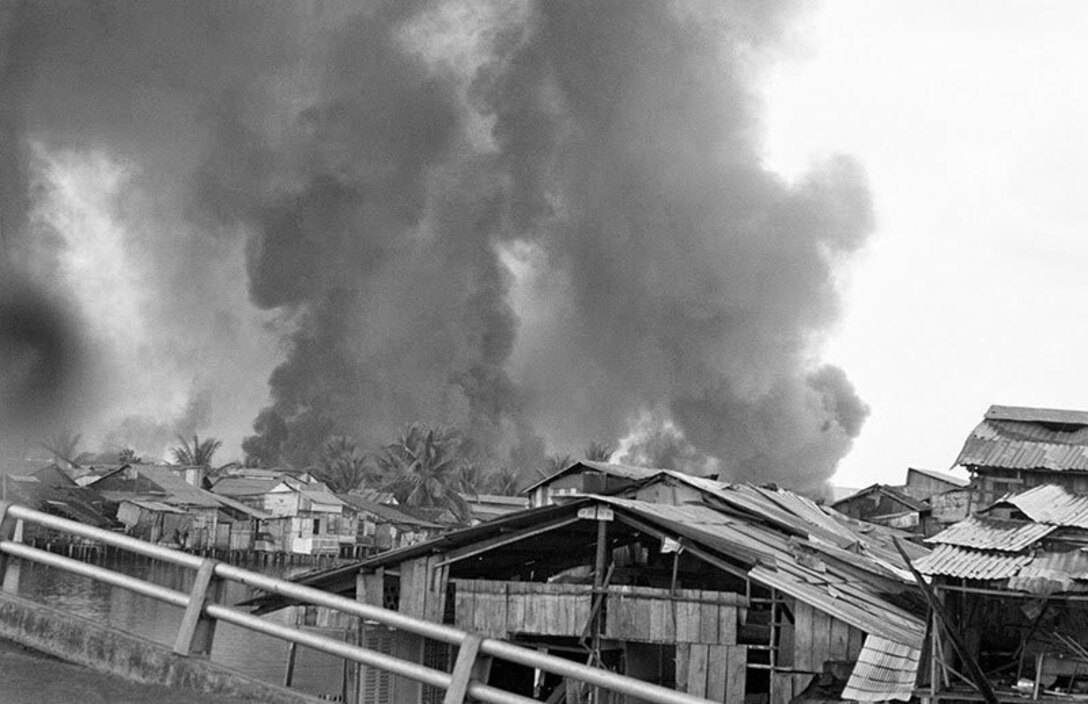
Battle of Huế

After the Fall of Saigon in 1975, some of the historic features of Huế were neglected because they were seen by the victorious communist regime and some other Vietnamese as "relics from the feudal regime"; the Communist Party of Vietnam (then Workers' Party of Vietnam) doctrine described the Nguyễn dynasty as "feudal" and "reactionary". With the adoption of liberalizing reforms, these hostile policies have been abandoned. Some of the city's historic areas and buildings are undergoing restoration, including the full reconstruction of Kien Trung Palace in 2024.

In recognition of Huế's rapid development, the city became Vietnam's sixth centrally-governed municipality in 2025. As part of this process, Huế was merged with the rest of Thừa Thiên Huế province to streamline administration. The National Assembly of Vietnam voted and passed a resolution to establish Huế city as a direct-controlled municipality, comprising the entirety of Thừa Thiên Huế province. At the same time, the former provincial city Huế was divided into two new districts, Phú Xuân district and Thuận Hóa district. Huế municipality officially came into operation in 2025.

== Geography ==
The Perfume River (called Sông Hương or Hương Giang in Vietnamese) passes through the center of the city. The city also accommodates the Tam Giang–Cau Hai lagoon, the largest lagoon in Southeast Asia, which is 68 kilometres (42 mi) long with a surface area of 220 square kilometres (85 sq mi). The city is divided into four distinct zones: mountainous areas, hills, plains, and lagoons separated from the sea by sandbanks. It has a coastline of 128 kilometres (80 mi). The mountains, located along the western and southwestern borders, cover more than half of the province’s total area, with elevations ranging from 500 metres (1,600 ft) to 1,480 metres (4,860 ft). The hills, which lie between the mountains and the plains, account for about one-third of the territory and range in height from 20 metres (66 ft) to 200 metres (660 ft), with occasional peaks rising to 400 metres (1,300 ft). The plains occupy roughly one-tenth of the surface area, reaching elevations of up to 20 metres (66 ft) above sea level. The lagoons, located between the hills, represent the remaining 5% of the city’s area.

Natural landscapes of Huế

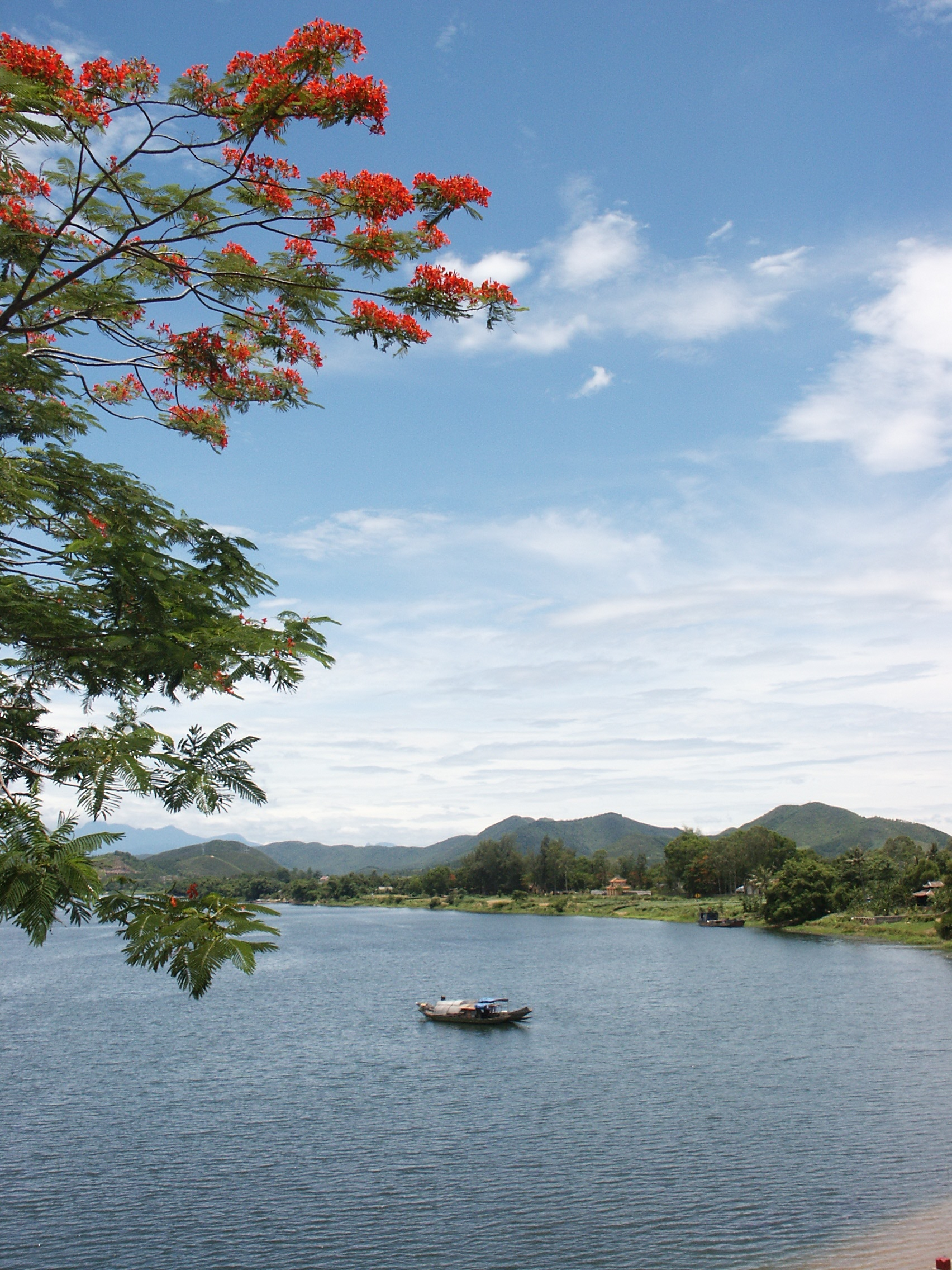
Perfume River

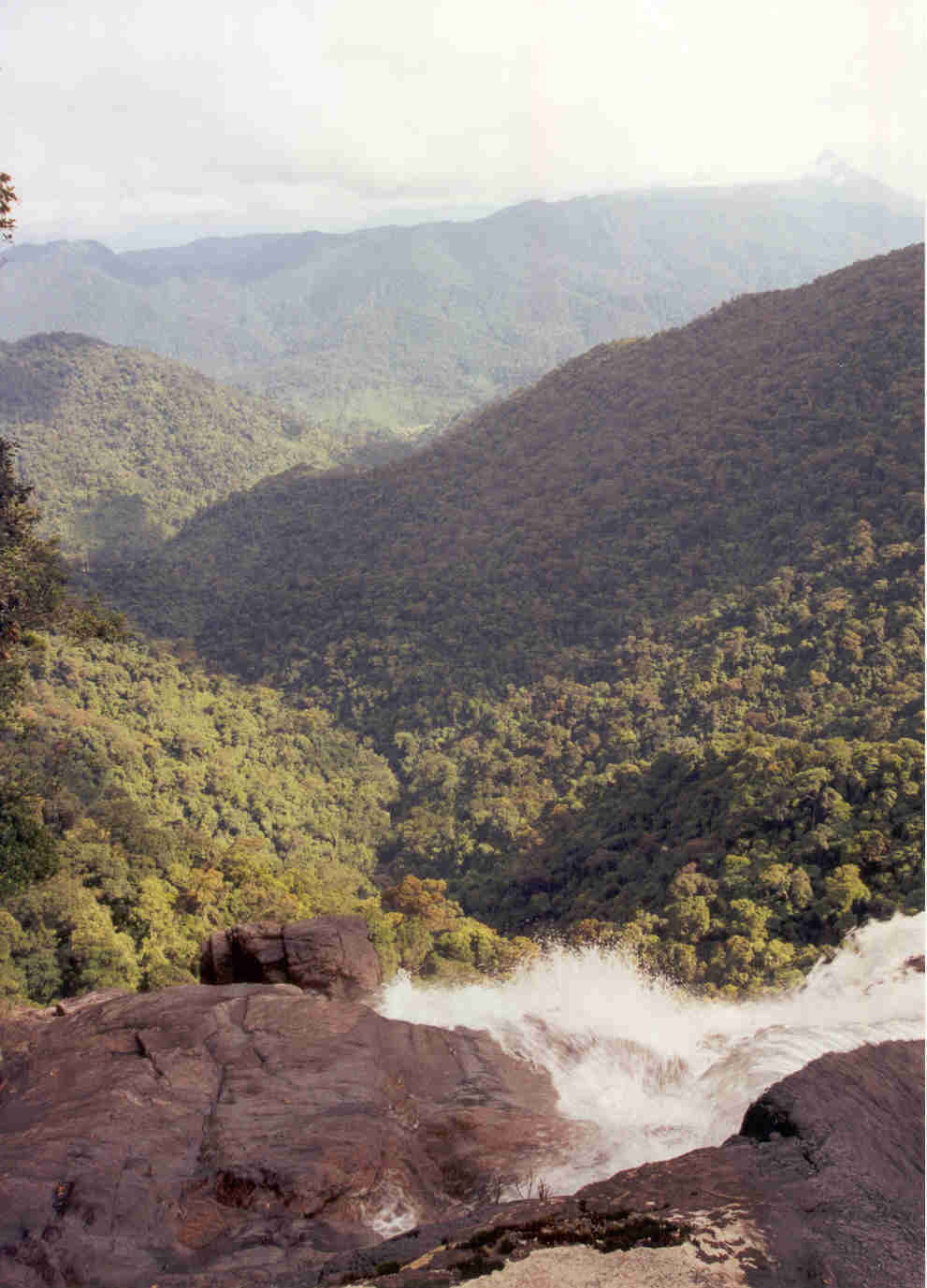
Bạch Mã National Park

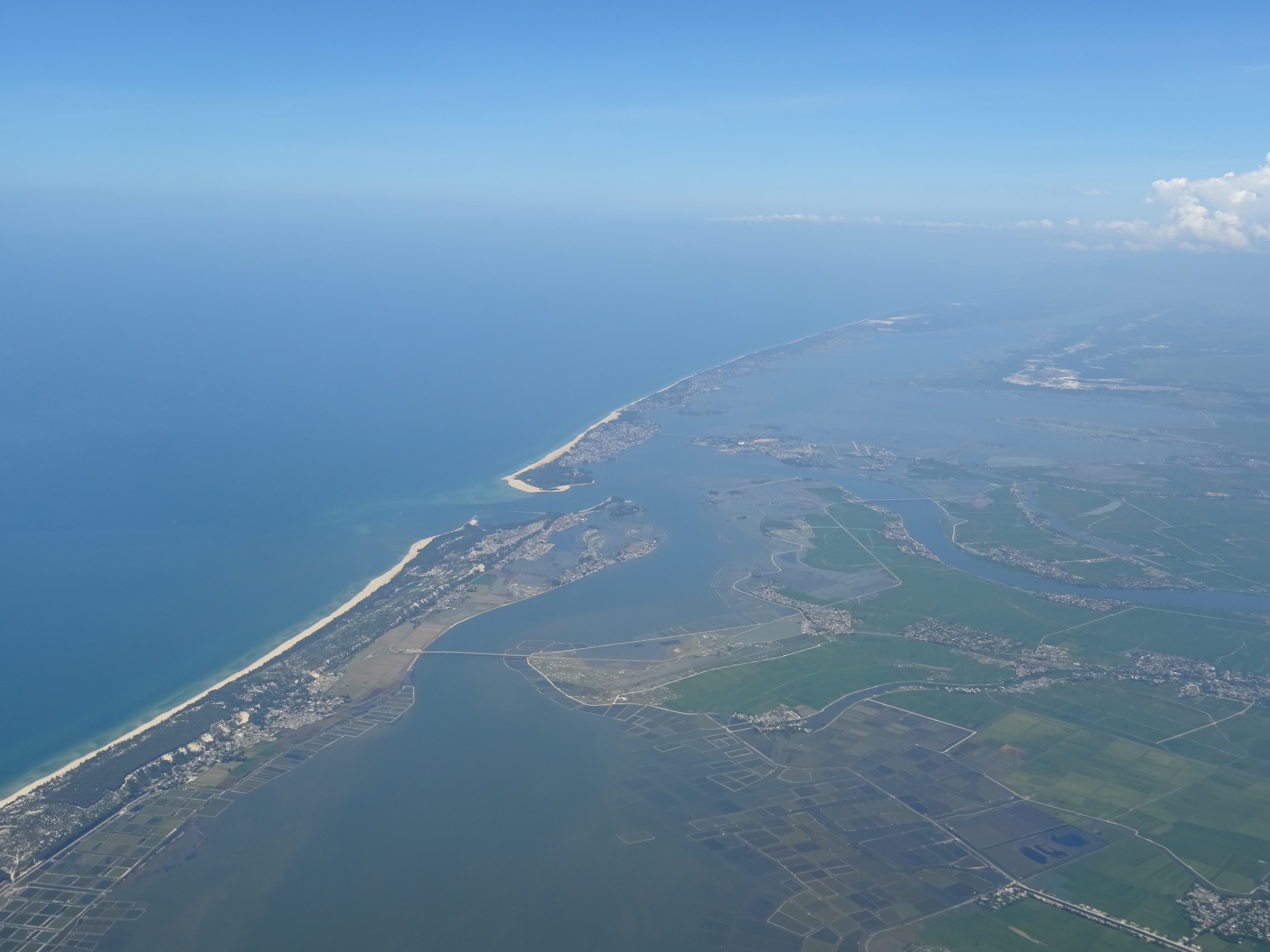
Tam Giang–Cầu Hai lagoon

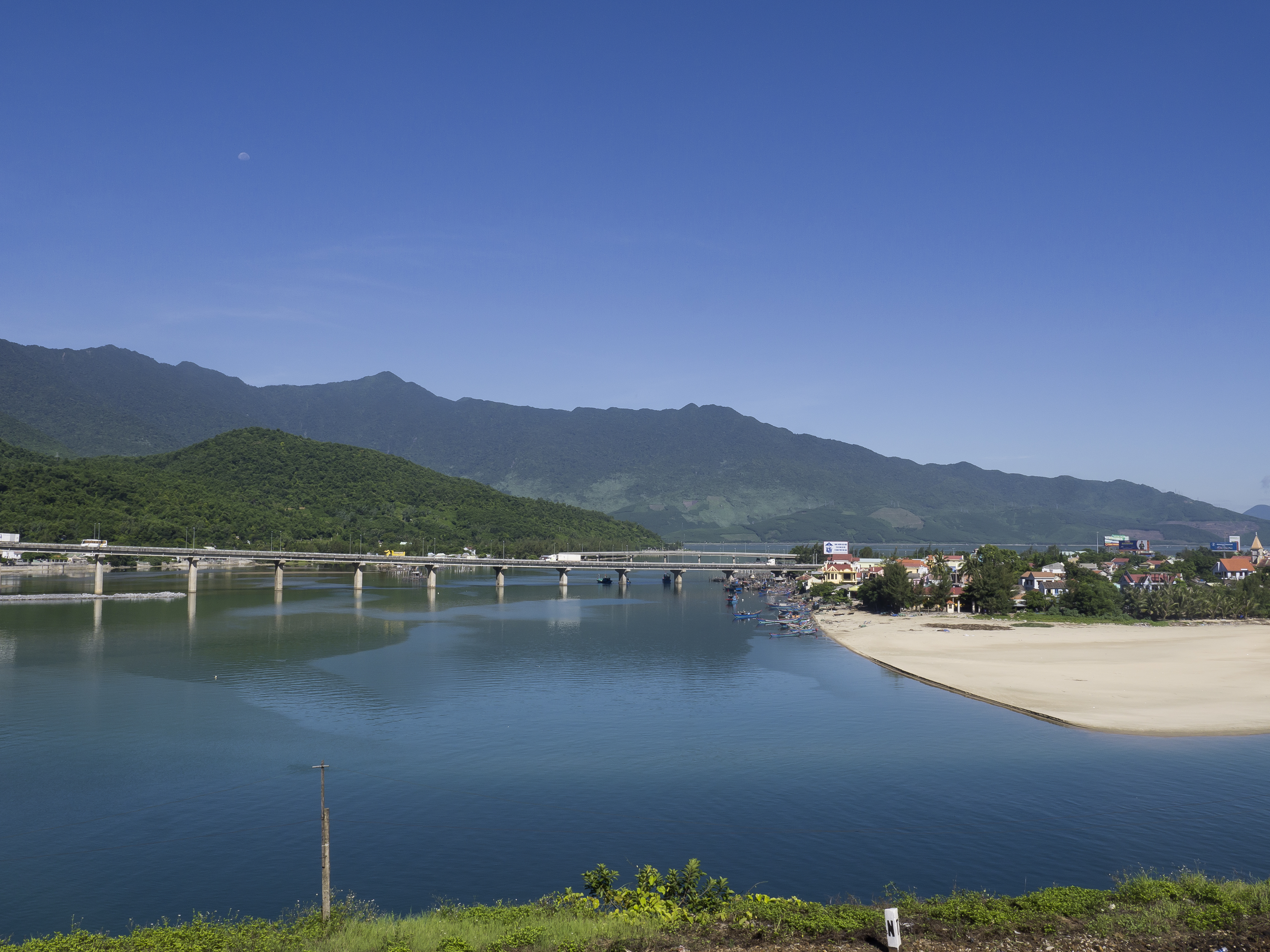
Lăng Cô

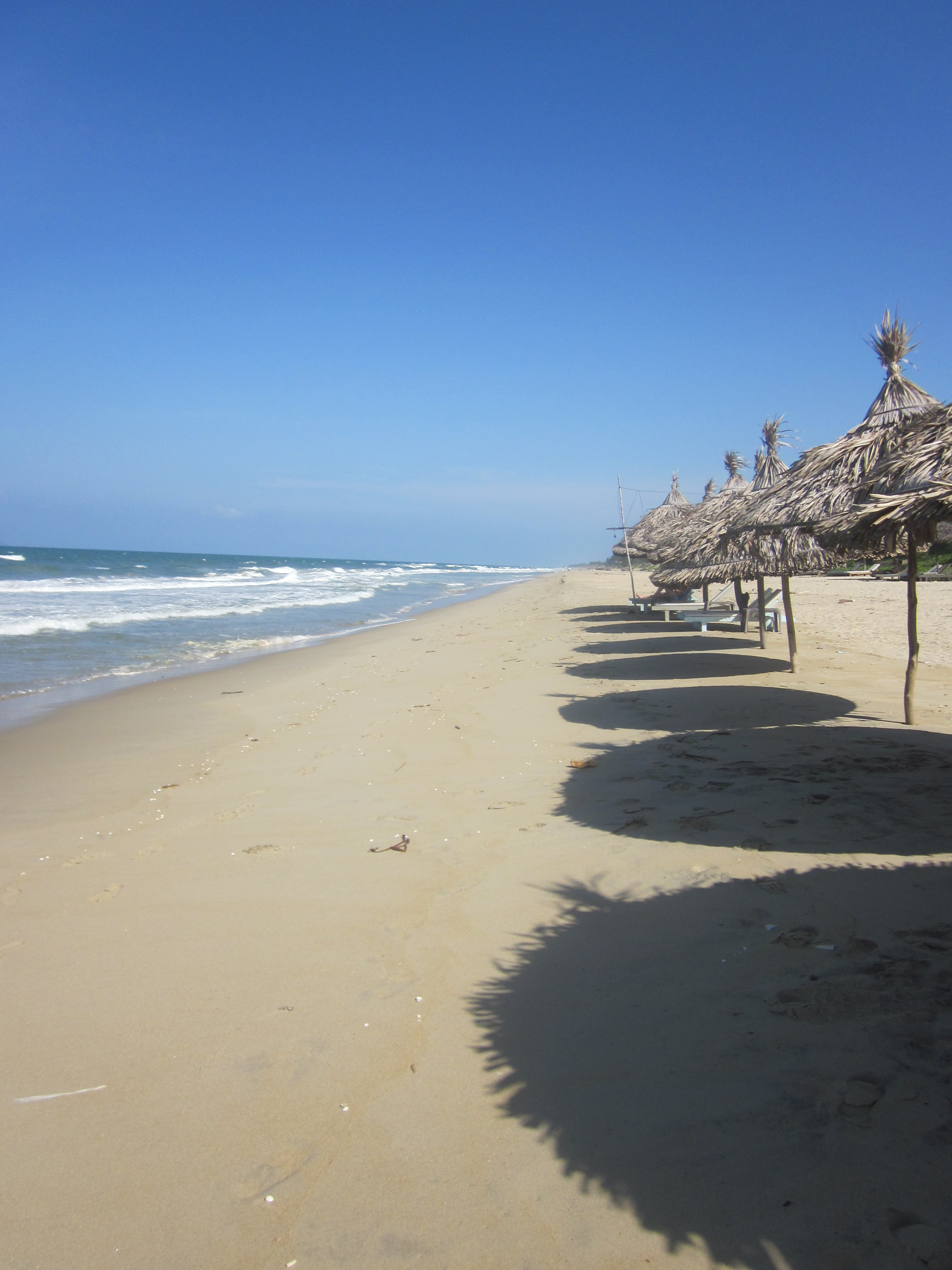
Phú Vang

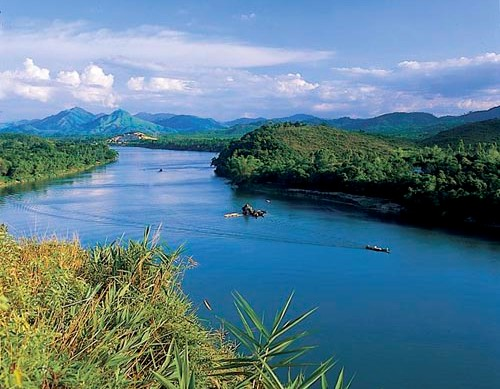
Vọng Cảnh Hill

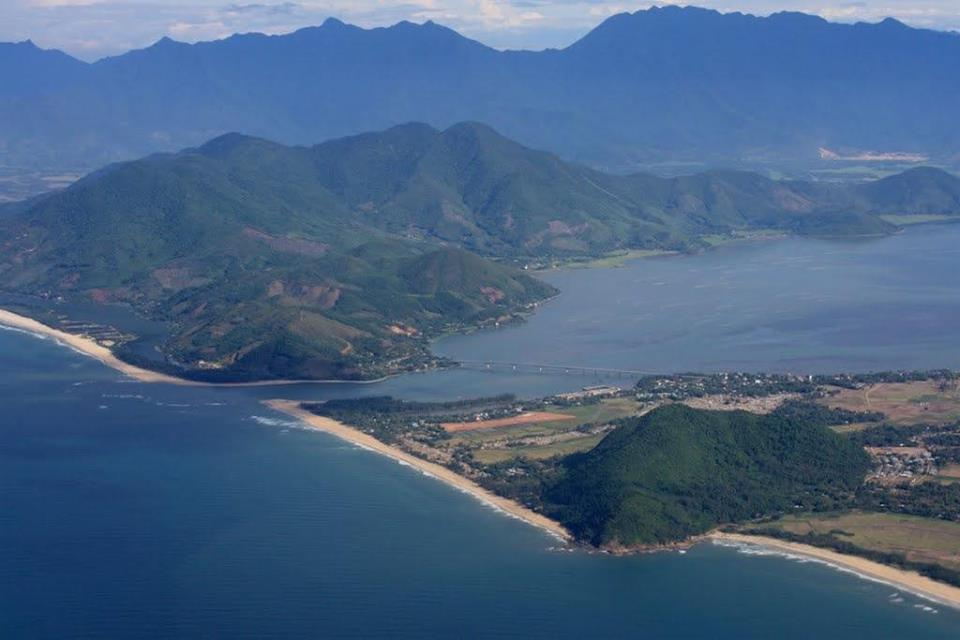
Vinh Hiền

=== Climate ===
Huế’s climate mostly resembles the rest of central Vietnam, characterized as tropical monsoon, and because of the topography and altitude, several climatic types occur which can be the same as found in temperate latitudes (A Lưới and Bạch Mã). The climate is similar to central Vietnam in general: a tropical monsoon climate. In the plains and in the hills, the average annual temperature is 25 °C (77 °F), but in the mountains only 21 °C (70 °F) (statistical yearbook 2004). The cool season is from November to March with cold northeasterly winds. The lowest average monthly temperature is in January: 20 °C (68 °F). In the cool season temperatures can fall to 12 °C (54 °F) in the plains and the relative humidity is high, between 85% and 95%. Then follows a warmer period from April to September with average monthly temperatures up to 29 °C (84 °F) in July, reaching up to 41 °C (106 °F) at times. It is very humid in July but relative humidity is lower, sometimes down to 50%.

The annual precipitation in the city is 3,200 millimetres (130 in), and there are variations. Depending on the year, the annual average may be 2,500 millimetres (98 in) to 3,500 millimetres (140 in) in the plains and 3,000 millimetres (120 in) to 4,500 millimetres (180 in) in the mountains. In some years the rainfall may be higher and reach more than 5,000 millimetres (200 in) in the mountains. The rainy season is from September to December—about 70% of the precipitation occurring in those months. Rainfall often occurs in bursts which can cause flooding and erosion, with social, economic and environmental consequences. The historic floods of November 1999 led to 600 deaths and affected 600,000 homes.

Climate data for Huế
Month	Jan	Feb	Mar	Apr	May	Jun	Jul	Aug	Sep	Oct	Nov	Dec	Year
Record high °C (°F)	34.6 (94.3)	36.3 (97.3)	38.6 (101.5)	42.2 (108.0)	42.1 (107.8)	40.7 (105.3)	40.2 (104.4)	40.2 (104.4)	39.7 (103.5)	36.1 (97.0)	35.4 (95.7)	32.2 (90.0)	42.2 (108.0)
Mean daily maximum °C (°F)	23.5 (74.3)	24.5 (76.1)	27.5 (81.5)	31.1 (88.0)	33.5 (92.3)	34.7 (94.5)	34.7 (94.5)	34.2 (93.6)	31.7 (89.1)	29.0 (84.2)	26.5 (79.7)	23.8 (74.8)	29.6 (85.3)
Daily mean °C (°F)	19.9 (67.8)	20.8 (69.4)	23.1 (73.6)	26.1 (79.0)	28.2 (82.8)	29.3 (84.7)	29.2 (84.6)	28.8 (83.8)	27.1 (80.8)	25.3 (77.5)	23.2 (73.8)	20.7 (69.3)	25.1 (77.2)
Mean daily minimum °C (°F)	17.5 (63.5)	18.2 (64.8)	20.2 (68.4)	22.7 (72.9)	24.5 (76.1)	25.3 (77.5)	25.2 (77.4)	25.1 (77.2)	24.1 (75.4)	22.8 (73.0)	21.0 (69.8)	18.6 (65.5)	22.1 (71.8)
Record low °C (°F)	8.8 (47.8)	9.5 (49.1)	10.7 (51.3)	14.1 (57.4)	17.7 (63.9)	20.5 (68.9)	19.8 (67.6)	21.0 (69.8)	19.1 (66.4)	15.9 (60.6)	12.9 (55.2)	9.5 (49.1)	8.8 (47.8)
Average rainfall mm (inches)	129.3 (5.09)	63.3 (2.49)	51.3 (2.02)	58.9 (2.32)	111.3 (4.38)	103.4 (4.07)	94.6 (3.72)	138.8 (5.46)	410.7 (16.17)	772.7 (30.42)	641.7 (25.26)	349.9 (13.78)	2,936.4 (115.61)
Average rainy days	15.5	11.6	10.2	9.2	11.7	9.3	8.5	10.7	16.3	20.8	20.9	20.2	165.1
Average relative humidity (%)	89.6	89.9	87.8	84.1	79.1	75.4	74.1	76.4	83.6	87.7	89.1	90.2	83.9
Mean monthly sunshine hours	104.0	110.3	140.8	175.9	230.9	232.5	236.7	209.9	169.2	130.6	101.2	76.0	1,916.1
Source 1: Vietnam Institute for Building Science and Technology
Source 2: The Yearbook of Indochina

Climate data for A Lưới
Month	Jan	Feb	Mar	Apr	May	Jun	Jul	Aug	Sep	Oct	Nov	Dec	Year
Record high °C (°F)	31.5 (88.7)	34.6 (94.3)	36.2 (97.2)	39.2 (102.6)	38.0 (100.4)	36.5 (97.7)	34.9 (94.8)	35.3 (95.5)	33.9 (93.0)	32.4 (90.3)	31.2 (88.2)	30.7 (87.3)	39.2 (102.6)
Mean daily maximum °C (°F)	21.4 (70.5)	23.4 (74.1)	26.6 (79.9)	29.4 (84.9)	30.4 (86.7)	30.7 (87.3)	30.5 (86.9)	29.8 (85.6)	28.3 (82.9)	25.6 (78.1)	22.9 (73.2)	20.7 (69.3)	26.6 (79.9)
Daily mean °C (°F)	17.3 (63.1)	18.5 (65.3)	20.7 (69.3)	22.9 (73.2)	24.2 (75.6)	25.4 (77.7)	25.0 (77.0)	24.7 (76.5)	23.3 (73.9)	21.7 (71.1)	19.9 (67.8)	17.7 (63.9)	21.8 (71.2)
Mean daily minimum °C (°F)	14.8 (58.6)	15.5 (59.9)	17.2 (63.0)	19.3 (66.7)	20.8 (69.4)	22.1 (71.8)	21.7 (71.1)	21.6 (70.9)	20.5 (68.9)	19.4 (66.9)	18.0 (64.4)	15.7 (60.3)	18.9 (66.0)
Record low °C (°F)	3.8 (38.8)	8.2 (46.8)	8.1 (46.6)	12.5 (54.5)	12.6 (54.7)	16.6 (61.9)	17.4 (63.3)	17.4 (63.3)	14.7 (58.5)	10.8 (51.4)	9.2 (48.6)	5.4 (41.7)	3.8 (38.8)
Average precipitation mm (inches)	80.1 (3.15)	48.9 (1.93)	70.4 (2.77)	160.3 (6.31)	253.7 (9.99)	188.0 (7.40)	167.0 (6.57)	228.4 (8.99)	438.6 (17.27)	856.7 (33.73)	757.4 (29.82)	317.7 (12.51)	3,606 (141.97)
Average rainy days	16.6	13.4	14.5	16.5	20.1	14.4	14.9	17.4	20.5	23.2	22.5	21.9	216.3
Average relative humidity (%)	91.6	91.0	89.3	87.8	86.1	80.6	80.3	82.2	89.1	91.6	92.9	92.9	88.0
Mean monthly sunshine hours	112.6	127.8	160.2	170.1	185.4	179.9	185.0	165.9	130.7	111.5	82.8	72.4	1,679.9
Source: Vietnam Institute for Building Science and Technology

Climate data for Nam Đông
Month	Jan	Feb	Mar	Apr	May	Jun	Jul	Aug	Sep	Oct	Nov	Dec	Year
Record high °C (°F)	35.7 (96.3)	37.7 (99.9)	39.5 (103.1)	42.2 (108.0)	41.8 (107.2)	40.4 (104.7)	40.5 (104.9)	40.1 (104.2)	38.8 (101.8)	35.5 (95.9)	35.0 (95.0)	34.2 (93.6)	42.2 (108.0)
Mean daily maximum °C (°F)	24.3 (75.7)	26.3 (79.3)	29.4 (84.9)	32.9 (91.2)	34.4 (93.9)	35.0 (95.0)	34.7 (94.5)	34.2 (93.6)	32.0 (89.6)	29.0 (84.2)	26.4 (79.5)	23.7 (74.7)	30.2 (86.4)
Daily mean °C (°F)	20.1 (68.2)	21.2 (70.2)	23.6 (74.5)	26.3 (79.3)	27.5 (81.5)	28.2 (82.8)	28.0 (82.4)	27.7 (81.9)	26.4 (79.5)	24.6 (76.3)	22.6 (72.7)	20.3 (68.5)	24.7 (76.5)
Mean daily minimum °C (°F)	17.3 (63.1)	18.0 (64.4)	20.0 (68.0)	22.2 (72.0)	23.5 (74.3)	24.0 (75.2)	23.7 (74.7)	23.7 (74.7)	23.1 (73.6)	21.9 (71.4)	20.4 (68.7)	18.2 (64.8)	21.4 (70.5)
Record low °C (°F)	10.6 (51.1)	11.0 (51.8)	10.6 (51.1)	16.4 (61.5)	17.0 (62.6)	19.8 (67.6)	20.3 (68.5)	20.4 (68.7)	18.5 (65.3)	15.1 (59.2)	13.1 (55.6)	8.7 (47.7)	8.7 (47.7)
Average precipitation mm (inches)	116.2 (4.57)	53.5 (2.11)	62.3 (2.45)	103.4 (4.07)	216.9 (8.54)	195.0 (7.68)	162.1 (6.38)	227.9 (8.97)	489.5 (19.27)	945.2 (37.21)	831.7 (32.74)	334.9 (13.19)	3,763.3 (148.16)
Average rainy days	15.9	11.8	11.0	12.2	17.7	15.3	15.3	16.0	19.7	22.3	21.8	21.0	199.9
Average relative humidity (%)	88.1	88.0	85.2	82.2	81.8	80.3	80.0	81.8	86.7	89.9	91.5	91.8	85.6
Mean monthly sunshine hours	107.4	124.0	161.2	175.3	208.5	212.2	213.0	192.9	154.5	118.6	91.7	69.5	1,832
Source: Vietnam Institute for Building Science and Technology

Average sea temperature
Month	Jan	Feb	Mar	Apr	May	Jun	Jul	Aug	Sep	Oct	Nov	Dec	Year
Average temperature °C (°F)	24 °C (75 °F)	23 °C (73 °F)	24 °C (75 °F)	26 °C (79 °F)	28 °C (82 °F)	30 °C (86 °F)	30 °C (86 °F)	30 °C (86 °F)	29 °C (84 °F)	28 °C (82 °F)	27 °C (81 °F)	25 °C (77 °F)	27 °C (81 °F)

=== Biodiversity and conservation ===
A region known as the "Green Corridor" is home to some rare species. New species of snake, butterfly, and orchid have been found there in 2005 and 2006, as stated by Chris Dickinson of the World Wide Fund for Nature (WWF) on 26 September 2007. The scientists discovered 11 new species of plants and animals, including a snake, two butterflies and five leafless orchid varieties. The new snake species is a white-lipped keelback (Hebius leucomystax). The new butterfly species are a skipper from the genus Zela, and the other from Satyrinae. The new plant species also include one in the genus Aspidistra, and a poisonous Arum perennial.

== Administrative divisions ==
Huế city is subdivided into 40 commune-level administrative units, include 21 wards and 19 communes:

Administrative divisions of Huế city

Name	Area^{(km²)}	Population
Wards (21)
An Cựu	16.71	55,305
Dương Nỗ	20.63	31,692
Hóa Châu	34.60	41,328
Hương An	19.43	35,885
Hương Thủy	33.93	29,192
Hương Trà	83.28	29,979
Kim Long	90.14	48,999
Kim Trà	42.80	36,296
Mỹ Thượng	28.83	44,736
Phong Dinh	87.17	28,012
Phong Điền	592.48	27,862
Phong Phú	60.85	19,057
Phong Quảng	41.70	25,728
Phong Thái	187.02	37,406
Phú Bài	344.63	38,410
Phú Xuân	10.38	130,247
Thuận An	36.48	54,846
Thuận Hóa	7.57	98,923
Thanh Thủy	48.92	43,569
Thủy Xuân	37.03	43,373
Vỹ Dạ	8.93	49,684

Name	Area^{(km²)}	Population
Communes (19)
A Lưới 1	198.59	12,882
A Lưới 2	97.62	20,496
A Lưới 3	154.23	8,976
A Lưới 4	233.65	10,752
A Lưới 5	464.40	3,760
Bình Điền	266.50	15,229
Chân Mây – Lăng Cô	261.38	50,831
Đan Điền	82.62	40,389
Hưng Lộc	95.62	32,586
Khe Tre	256.02	12,882
Long Quảng	215.85	8,883
Lộc An	177.58	39,217
Nam Đông	175.95	9,158
Phú Hồ	57.72	23,550
Phú Lộc	119.30	28,273
Phú Vang	86.19	39,250
Phú Vinh	57.95	47,674
Quảng Điền	45.93	41,798
Vinh Lộc	66.53	36,350

== Demographics ==
The average population of the province is 1,143,572; which consist of approximately 576,319 females and 567,253 males. The rural population is approximately 587,516 while the urban population is 556,056 (2015).

Largest cities or townships in Thừa Thiên Huế province (2015)
Rank	Name	Type	District	Population
1	Huế	City		354,124
2	Hương Trà	Town		116,147
3	Hương Thủy	Town		101,353
4	Thuận An	Township	Phú Vang district	21,220
5	Phú Đa	Township	Phú Vang district	12,381
6	Lăng Cô	Township	Phú Lộc district	12,177
7	Phú Lộc	Township	Phú Lộc district	10,613
8	Sịa	Township	Quảng Điền district	10,583
9	A Lưới	Township	A Lưới district	7,393
10	Phong Điền	Township	Phong Điền district	6,743
11	Khe Tre	Township	Nam Đông district	3,818

== Culture ==
=== Clothing ===
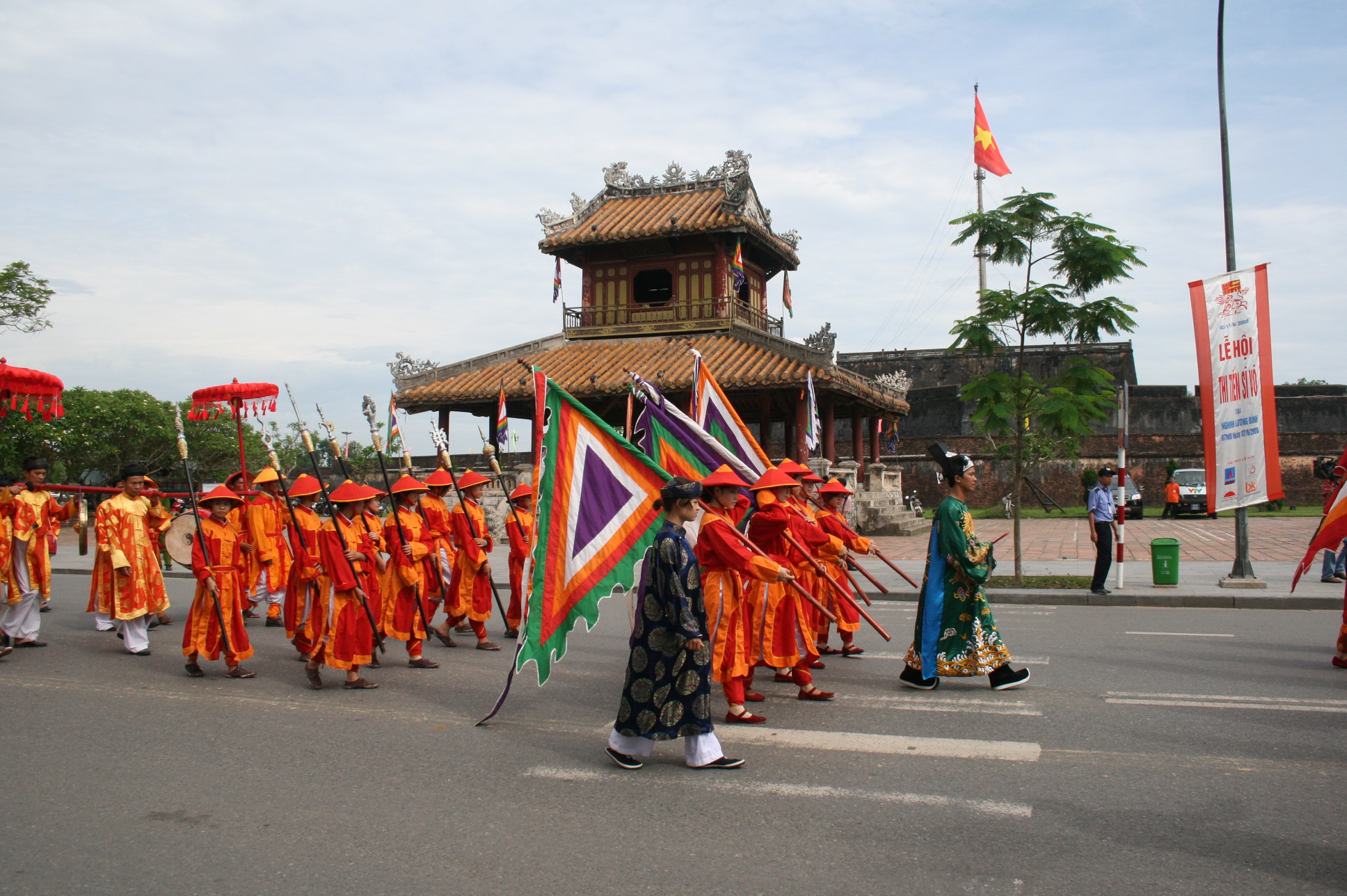
Festival in Huế

The design of the áo dài, a Vietnamese national costume, developed from the costumes worn by civilians in Đàng Trong in the 18th century after the costume reform of lord Nguyễn Phúc Khoát. A court historian of the time described the rules of dress as follows:

Thường phục thì đàn ông, đàn bà dùng áo cổ đứng ngắn tay, cửa ống tay rộng hoặc hẹp tùy tiện. Áo thì hai bên nách trở xuống phải khâu kín liền, không được xẻ mở. Duy đàn ông không muốn mặc áo cổ tròn ống tay hẹp cho tiện khi làm việc thì được phép.

Outside court, men and women wear gowns with straight collars and short sleeves. The sleeves are large or small depending on the weather. There are seams on both sides running down from the sleeve, so the gown is not open anywhere. Men may wear a round collar and a short sleeve for more convenience.

— Đại Nam thực lục (Note: Đại Nam thực lục)

This outfit evolved into the áo ngũ thân, a type of five-part costume most popular in Vietnam in the 19th and 20th centuries. Inspired by Paris fashions, Nguyễn Cát Tường and other artists associated with Hanoi University redesigned the ngũ thân to create the modern áo dài in the 1920s and 1930s. While the áo dài and nón lá are seen as a symbol of Vietnam as a whole, the combination is seen by Vietnamese as being particularly evocative of Huế. Violet-coloured áo dài are especially common in Huế, the color having a special connection to the city's heritage as a former capital.

=== Cuisine ===
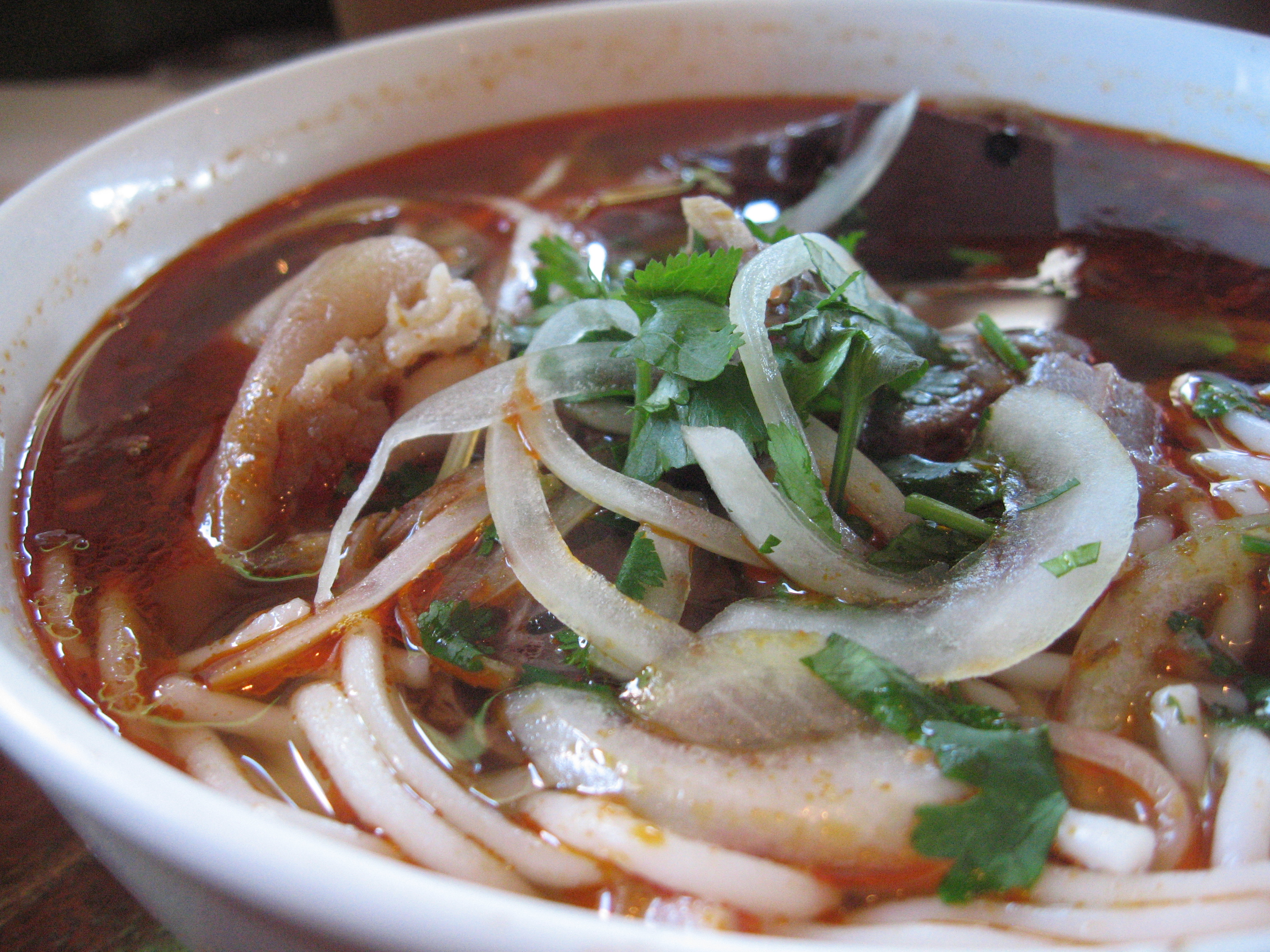
Bún bò Huế, a typical noodle dish

The cuisine of Huế forms the heart of Central Vietnamese cuisine, and one of the differences is the prominence of vegetarianism in the city. Several all-vegetarian restaurants are scattered in corners of the city to serve the locals who have a tradition of eating a vegetarian meal twice a month, as part of their Buddhist beliefs. Nam Châu Hội Quán is a traditional dining hall. Huế dishes are known for their relatively small serving size with refined presentation, a vestige of its royal cuisine. Huế cuisine is notable for often being very spicy.

Huế cuisine has luxurious and popular rustic dishes. It consists of several distinctive dishes from small and delicate creations, originally made to please the appetites of Nguyen feudal lords, emperors, and their hundreds of concubines and wives.

=== Religion ===
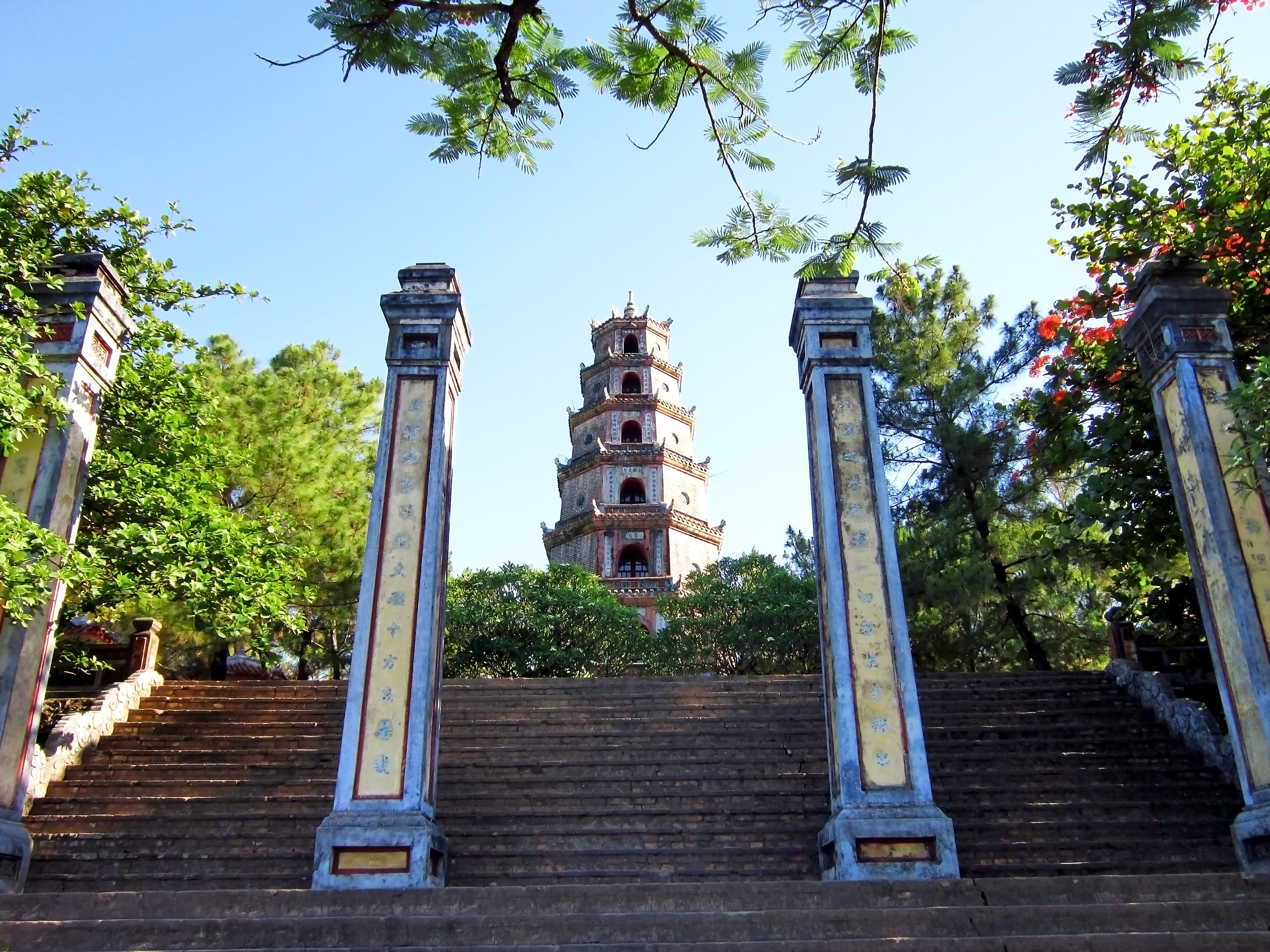
Pagoda of the Celestial Lady

In 1963, Thích Quảng Đức drove from Huế to Saigon to protest anti-Buddhist policies of the South Vietnamese government, setting himself on fire on a Saigon street. Photos of the self-immolation became some of the enduring images of the Vietnam War.

Thích Nhất Hạnh, a Zen master who originated from Huế and lived for years in exile including France and the United States, returned to his home town in October 2018 and resided there at the Tu Hieu pagoda until his death in 2022.

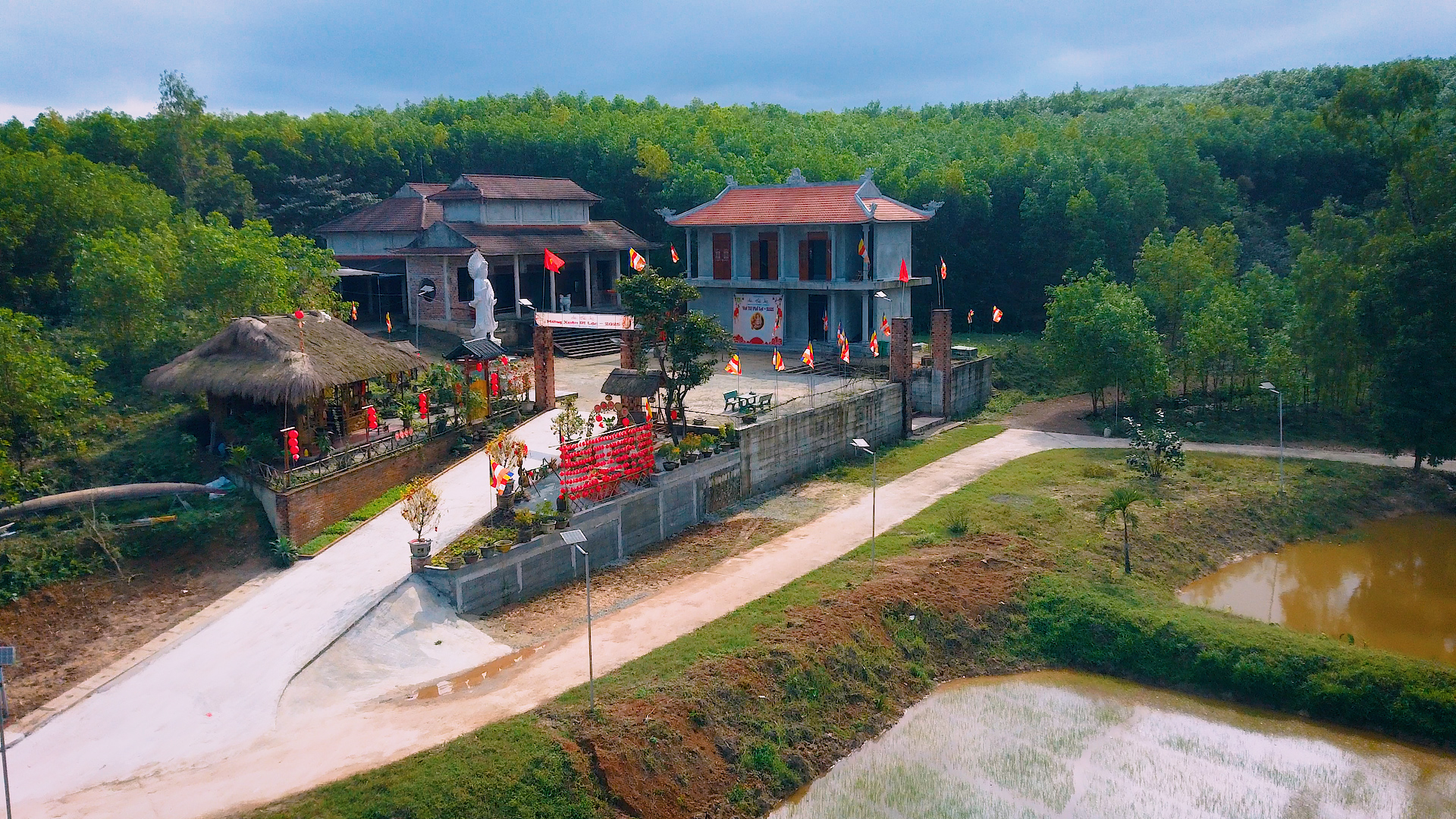
Chùa Phổ Lại in Phong Thái Ward, Huế City, Vietnam

Among Buddhist sites in the surrounding midland area of Huế is Chùa Phổ Lại, which hosts religious, cultural, and community activities.

=== Tourism ===
Complex of Huế Monuments
UNESCO World Heritage Site
- Interactive map of Complex of Huế Monuments
- Criteria: Cultural: iv
- Reference: 678
- Inscription: 1993 (17th Session)
- Area: 315.47 ha (779.5 acres)
- Buffer zone: 71.93 ha (177.7 acres)

Huế is known for its historic monuments, which have earned it a place in UNESCO's World Heritage Sites.

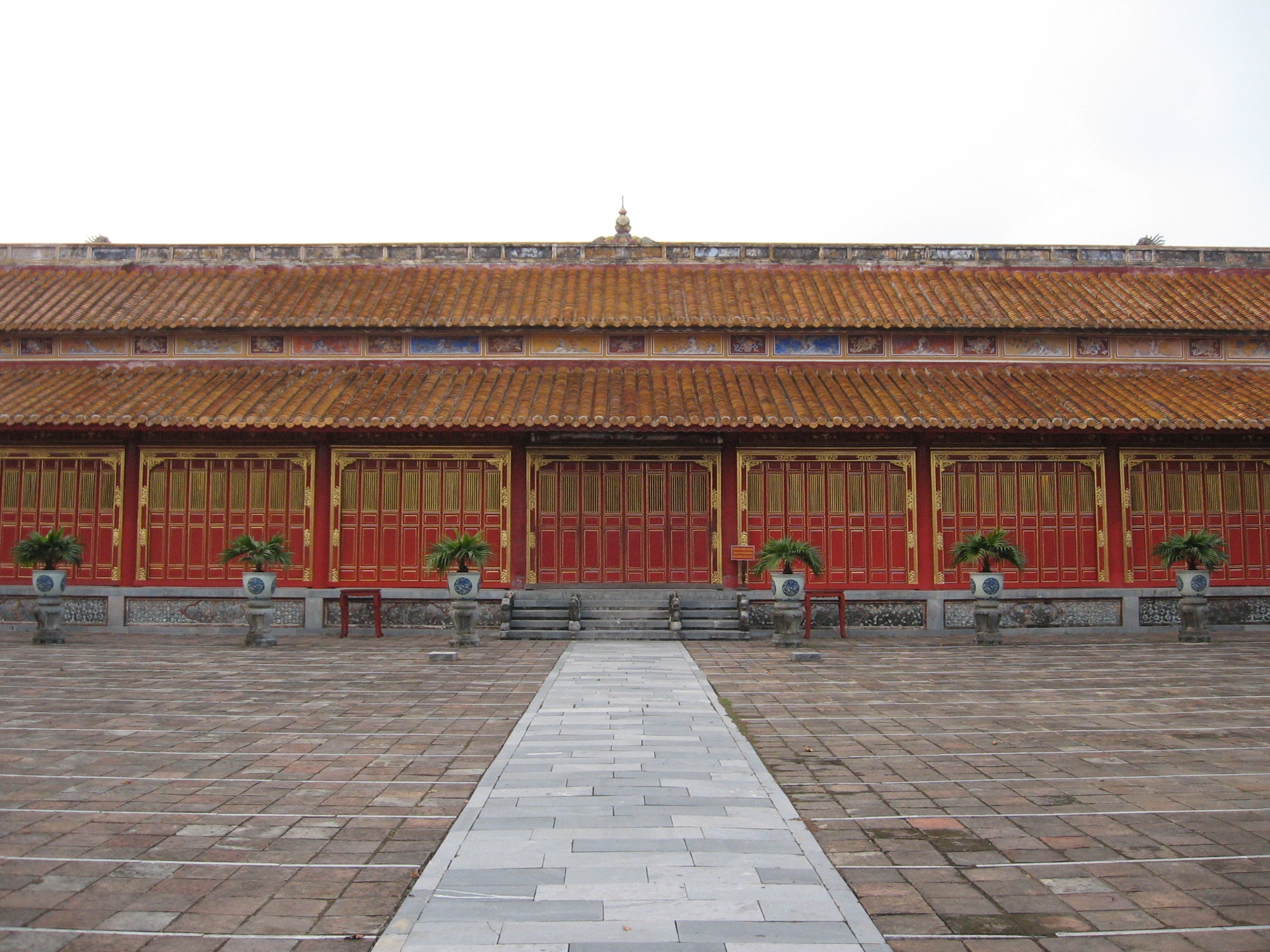
Forbidden Purple City of Huế, once the emperor's home

Roughly along the Perfume River from Huế lie other monuments, including the tombs of several emperors, including Minh Mạng, Khải Định, and Tự Đức. Also notable is the Thiên Mụ Temple, the largest pagoda in Huế and the official symbol of the city.

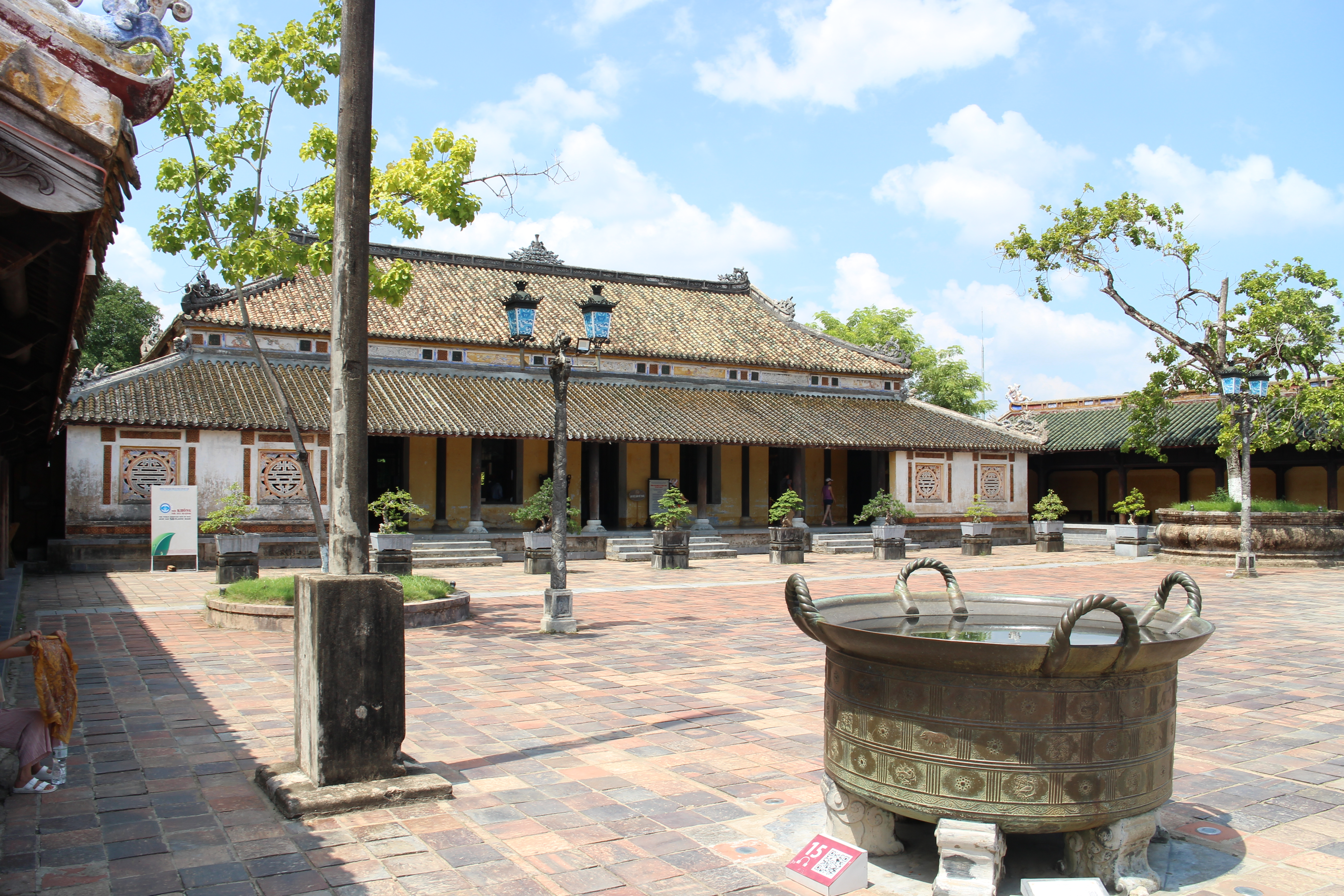
Imperial City of Huế, containing palaces and shrines

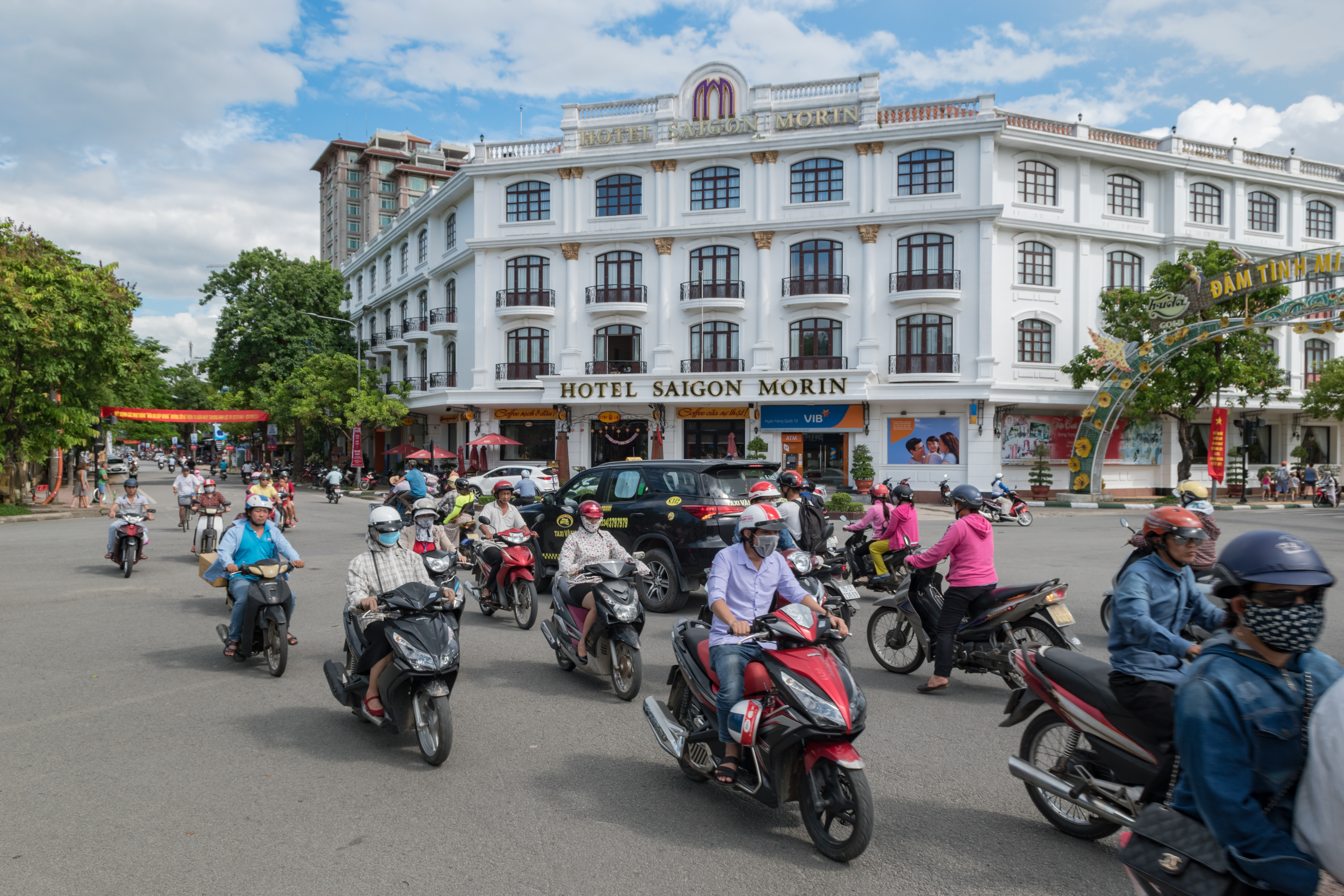
Saigon Morin Hotel, the oldest hotel in Huế on Lê Lợi Street, opened in the 20th century

In the first 11 months of 2012, Huế received 2.4 million visitors, an increase of 24.6% from the same period of 2011. 803,000 of those 2.4 million visitors were foreign guests, an increase of 25.7%. While tourism plays a role in the city's socioeconomic development, it also has impacts on the environment and natural resource base. For example, services associated with tourism, such as travel, the development of infrastructure and its operation, and the production and consumption of goods, are all energy-intensive. Research by the Climate and Development Knowledge Network has identified traditional 'garden houses' as having the potential to increase tourist traffic and revenue. Apart from the environmental, economic and cultural benefits provided by garden houses, their promotion could pave the way for other low carbon development initiatives.

== Economy ==
The retail sales of goods and services (trade, hotel, restaurant, tourism) in the province is 10,960.6 billion đồng, or 0.9% of national GDP. This is compared with 12.7% for Hanoi and 23.5% for Ho Chi Minh City (2009). The province has more than 120 km of coastline, which provides for a seafood industry that produces over 40,000 tonnes per year, consisting of over 500 species of fish.

There are more than 100 mines for minerals and non-mineral resources with the majority consisting of limestone, granite and kaolin.

Huế is home to a number of historically significant buildings, largely a legacy from its time as a capital of the Nguyễn dynasty (1802–1945), including the Imperial Citadel, the Flag Tower, the Royal Palace, and the Royal Tombs. Huế's Forbidden Purple City was once reserved solely for the royal family's use; it was damaged during the Vietnam War. Outside the city is the religious site known as Nam Giao Hill ("Heaven's Altar"). Huế Brewery Ltd is located on the Hương Giang river. The Brewery is a joint state-private partnership founded in 1990, with an initial investment of US$2.4 million and a capacity of 3 million liters per year, which has since grown to a capacity of 100 million liters per year in 2007.

== Infrastructure ==
=== Education ===
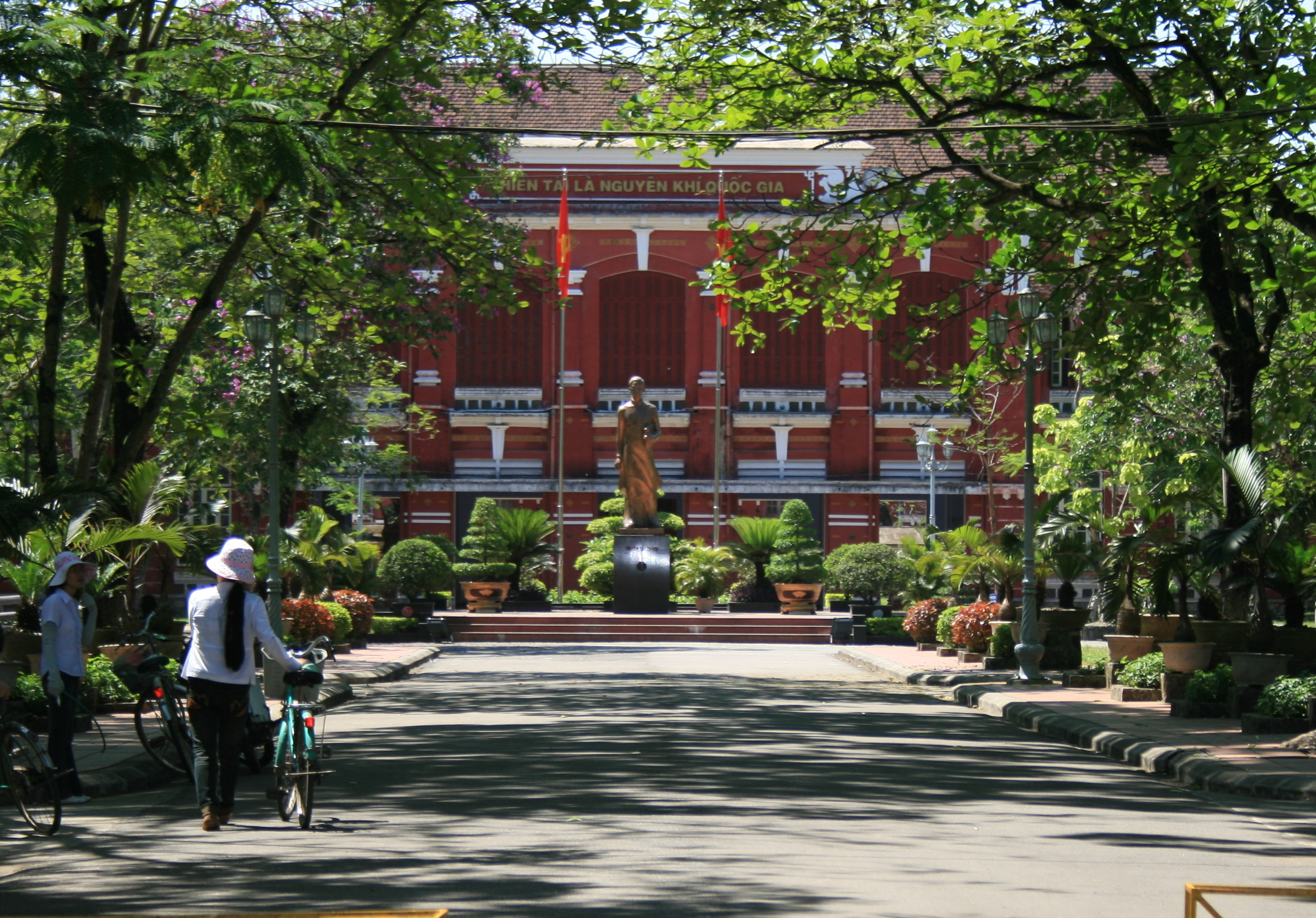
Quốc Học – Huế High School for the Gifted

The municipality is home to Huế University (e.g.: Huế Economic University, Huế University of Medicine and Pharmacy, Huế Pedagogical University, Huế Forestry and Agriculture University, Huế University of Sciences, Huế University of Arts, Huế Conservatory of Music and Huế College of Foreign Languages). As of 2009, the city had 190 schools, 1302 classrooms, 2184 teachers and 36,200 pupils.

=== Health ===
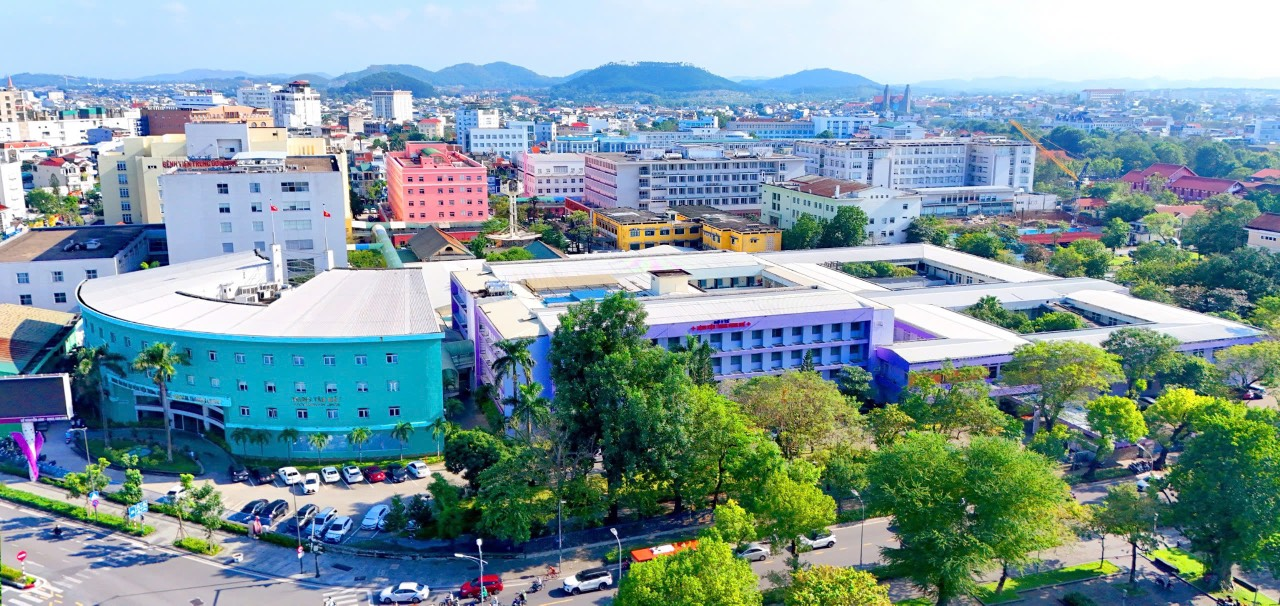
Huế Central Hospital

The Huế Central Hospital, established in 1894, was the first Western hospital in Vietnam. The hospital, providing 2078 beds and occupying 120,000 square meters (30 acres), is one of three largest in the country along with Bach Mai Hospital in Hanoi and Cho Ray Hospital in Ho Chi Minh City, and is managed by the Ministry of Health.

=== Transportation ===
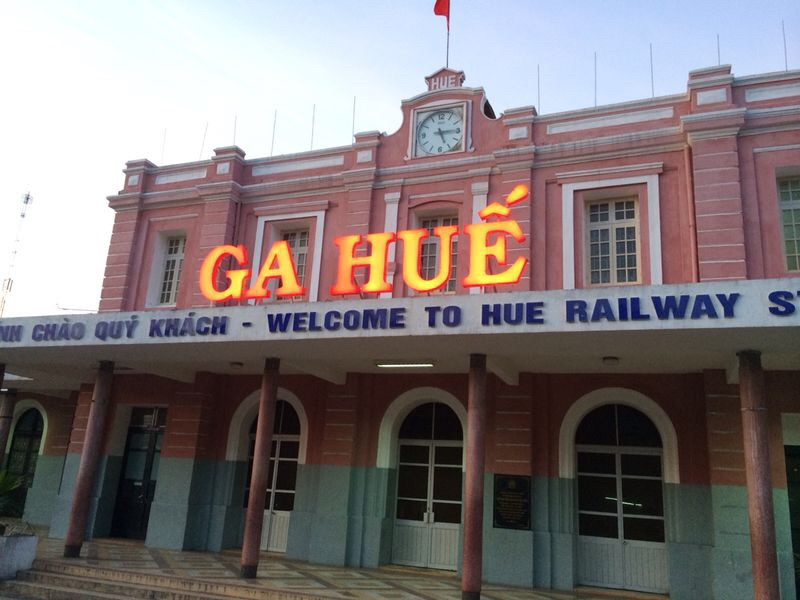
Huế railway station

Phu Bai International Airport, the province's sole airport, is situated 15 km south of Huế; it ranks fourth in passenger numbers among Vietnam's airports. While a new terminal was completed in 2023 to receive international flights, Phu Bai still only has direct flights to domestic destinations; the first international routes to Kunming, Taipei and Seoul are planned to be inaugurated in 2025.

== International relations ==
=== Twin towns – sister cities ===
Huế is twinned with:

- Gyeongju, South Korea
- Hanoi, Vietnam
- Ho Chi Minh City, Vietnam
- Honolulu, United States
- Namur, Belgium
- New Haven, United States
- São Luís, Brazil
- Yogyakarta, Indonesia

=== Cooperation and friendship ===
In addition to its twin towns, Huế cooperates with:

- Blois, France
