= Huế College of Foreign Languages =

College in Vietnam

Hue College of Foreign Languages
- Established: July 13, 2004
- Location: 57 Nguyễn Khoa Chiêm, Huế, Vietnam; 16.4668°N 107.5856°E
- Website: hucfl.hueuni.edu.vn

The Hue College of Foreign Languages (Vietnamese: Trường Đại học Ngoại ngữ Huế) is a college established in 2004 in Huế, Vietnam. It is part of Huế University.

== See also ==
- List of universities in Vietnam
