= Lộc An =

- Commune
- Rice fields in Lộc An

- Location in Vietnam
- Coordinates: 16.3246864569909°N 107.76522457521442°E
- Country: Vietnam
- Region: North Central Coast
- Municipality: Huế
- Established: 16 June 2025
- Administrative headquarters: An Lại Hamlet

Area
  - Total: 177.58 km^{2} (68.56 sq mi)

Population (2025)
  - Total: 39,217
  - Density: 220/km^{2} (570/sq mi)

Lộc An is a commune in the municipality of Huế, Vietnam.

On 16 June 2025, the Standing Committee of the National Assembly of Vietnam issued Resolution No. 1675/NQ-UBTVQH15 on the arrangement of commune-level administrative units in Huế. Under the resolution, the entire area and population of Lộc Hòa, Lộc Điền, and Lộc An communes, formerly part of Phú Lộc district, were merged to form a new commune named Lộc An.
