= Phú Lộc, Huế =

Phú Lộc Xã Phú Lộc
- Commune
- Phú Lộc commune
- Interactive map of Phú Lộc
- Coordinates: 16°16′N 107°53′E
- Country: Vietnam
- Region: North Central Coast
- Province: Huế
- Time zone: UTC+7 (UTC + 7)

Phú Lộc is a commune (xã) of Huế. The commune is located in the middle between the cities of Huế and Da Nang, to the south of Tam Giang – Cầu Hai lagoon and at the foot of Bạch Mã National Park.

In 1968, few months before the Tết Offensive, the Cầu Hai bridge was blown up by the North Vietnamese Army and Viet Cong. The bridge was later rebuilt.

Over the Cầu Hai Bay is the My A village. My A was famous for her main route that goes across the village that has coconut trees planted from generations. Villagers fled to the United States during the communist rule.
