= Nam Đông district =

Nam Đông District Huyện Nam Đông
- District
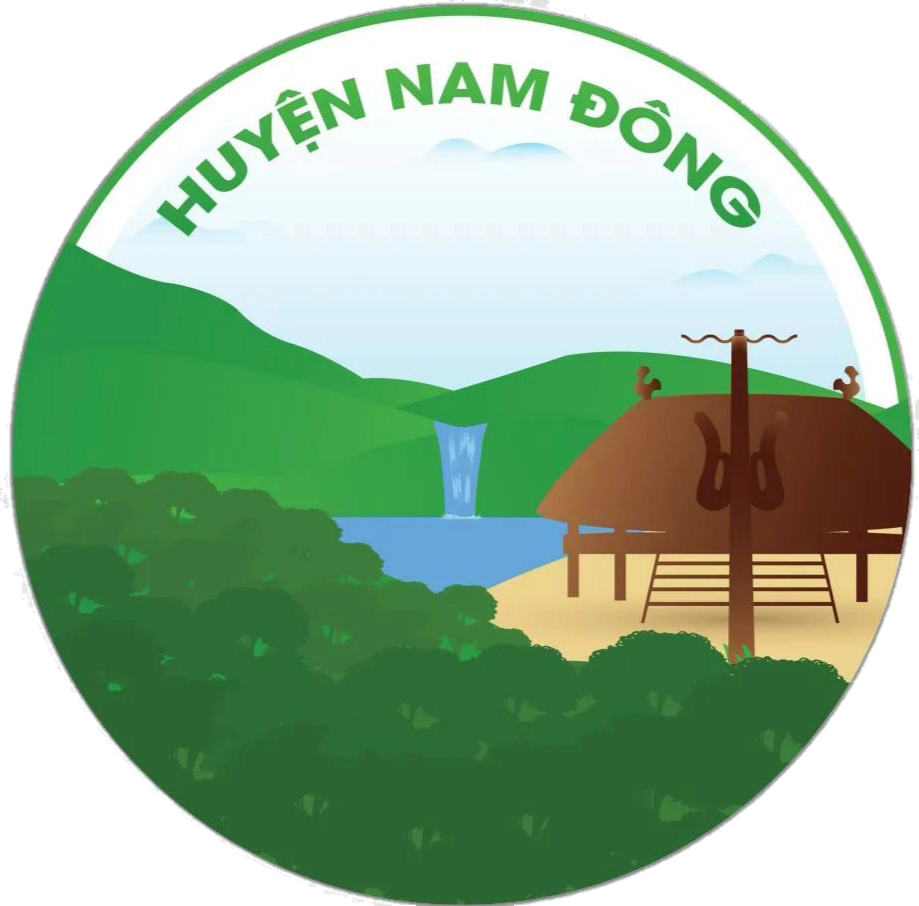
- Seal

- Location within Vietnam
- Country: Vietnam
- Region: North Central Coast
- Province: Thừa Thiên Huế
- Capital: Khe Tre

Area
  - Total: 251 sq mi (651 km^{2})

Population (2003)
  - Total: 22,333
- Time zone: UTC+7 (UTC + 7)

Nam Đông is a former rural district of Thừa Thiên Huế province in the North Central Coast region of Vietnam. As of 2003 the district had a population of 22,333. The district covers an area of 651 km². The district capital lies at Khe Tre.

Nam Dong is the southern gateway and key component in the economy of Thua Thien Hue Province. It is located in midland, highlands and bounded by Da Nang city and Quang Nam province in the south, Huong Thuy in the north, Phu Loc in the east and A Luoi prefecture in the west.

It has the least population of any district in Thua Thien Hue Province. There are 10,113 people from ethnic minorities (mainly Ka-tu people) and 13,295 ethnic Vietnamese and the female population is 11,493 (45.05%).

Its population density of 35.9 people/km² is the lowest in the province.

The population of working age is 11,589. Of these, 74.2% work in agricultural, forestry, and fisheries, 7.64% in industry and construction, 9.13% in service and trade, and 10.19% as civil servants.

Nam Dong is the smallest prefecture of Thua Thien Hue Province.

The terrain is rugged with low hills and low mountains. The lifestyle is difficult with a poor economy and a lack of material necessities. Total production value in 2007 was 280.389 million VND. Agriculture, forestry and aquaculture comprise 107.638 million VND (38.32%), mainly including the planting of fruit trees, industrial crops, food crops, livestock breeding, foresting such as rubber plant and exploiting forest products. There are 664 households living below the poverty line (13.98%).

Nam Dong had universal compulsory education through the completion of secondary school until 2006, and the education rates were higher than in neighbouring districts. The region is now connected to the internet.

== Climate ==
Climate data for Nam Đông
Month	Jan	Feb	Mar	Apr	May	Jun	Jul	Aug	Sep	Oct	Nov	Dec	Year
Record high °C (°F)	35.7 (96.3)	37.7 (99.9)	39.5 (103.1)	42.2 (108.0)	41.8 (107.2)	40.4 (104.7)	40.5 (104.9)	40.1 (104.2)	38.8 (101.8)	35.6 (96.1)	35.0 (95.0)	34.2 (93.6)	42.2 (108.0)
Mean daily maximum °C (°F)	24.3 (75.7)	26.3 (79.3)	29.4 (84.9)	32.9 (91.2)	34.4 (93.9)	35.0 (95.0)	34.7 (94.5)	34.2 (93.6)	32.0 (89.6)	29.0 (84.2)	26.4 (79.5)	23.7 (74.7)	30.2 (86.4)
Daily mean °C (°F)	20.1 (68.2)	21.2 (70.2)	23.6 (74.5)	26.3 (79.3)	27.5 (81.5)	28.2 (82.8)	28.0 (82.4)	27.7 (81.9)	26.4 (79.5)	24.6 (76.3)	22.6 (72.7)	20.3 (68.5)	24.7 (76.5)
Mean daily minimum °C (°F)	17.3 (63.1)	18.0 (64.4)	20.0 (68.0)	22.2 (72.0)	23.5 (74.3)	24.0 (75.2)	23.7 (74.7)	23.7 (74.7)	23.1 (73.6)	21.9 (71.4)	20.4 (68.7)	18.2 (64.8)	21.4 (70.5)
Record low °C (°F)	10.6 (51.1)	11.0 (51.8)	10.6 (51.1)	16.4 (61.5)	17.0 (62.6)	19.8 (67.6)	20.3 (68.5)	20.4 (68.7)	18.5 (65.3)	15.1 (59.2)	13.1 (55.6)	8.7 (47.7)	8.7 (47.7)
Average precipitation mm (inches)	116.2 (4.57)	53.5 (2.11)	62.3 (2.45)	103.4 (4.07)	216.9 (8.54)	195.0 (7.68)	162.1 (6.38)	227.9 (8.97)	489.5 (19.27)	945.2 (37.21)	831.7 (32.74)	334.9 (13.19)	3,763.3 (148.16)
Average rainy days	15.9	11.8	11.0	12.2	17.7	15.3	15.3	16.0	19.7	22.3	21.8	21.0	199.9
Average relative humidity (%)	88.1	88.0	85.2	82.2	81.8	80.3	80.0	81.8	86.7	89.9	91.5	91.8	85.6
Mean monthly sunshine hours	107.4	124.0	161.2	175.3	208.5	212.2	213.0	192.9	154.5	118.6	91.7	69.5	1,832
Source: Vietnam Institute for Building Science and Technology
