= Nam Đông =

- Commune
- Interactive map of Nam Đông
- Coordinates: 16.129751401575074°N 107.68364107106918°E
- Country: Vietnam
- Municipality: Huế
- Region: North Central Coast
- Established: 16 June 2025
- People's Committee headquarters: Phú Thuận Hamlet

Area
  - Total: 175.95 km^{2} (67.93 sq mi)

Population (2025)
  - Total: 9,158
- Website: namdong.hue.gov.vn

Nam Đông is a commune of Huế, Vietnam.

== History ==
The area of present-day Nam Đông Commune was formerly part of Nam Đông district, and later became part of Phú Lộc district, Huế.

On 16 June 2025, the Standing Committee of the National Assembly of Vietnam issued Resolution No. 1675/NQ-UBTVQH15 on the reorganization of commune-level administrative units of Huế. Under the resolution, the entire natural area and population of Hương Xuân, Thượng Nhật, and Hương Sơn communes, all formerly part of Phú Lộc district, were reorganized to form a new commune named Nam Đông.
