= Palace Library =

Classical and medieval Chinese and Korean Imperial bureau

The Palace Library (Chinese: 秘書省; in Vietnam: 秘書所, Bí thư sở) was a central government agency in imperial and monarchical China, Korea, and Vietnam generally in charge of maintaining and archiving the collection of the monarch's documents.

== China ==
Department of the Palace Library
- Traditional Chinese: 秘書省 or 祕書省
- Simplified Chinese: 秘书省 or 祕书省
Transcriptions
Standard Mandarin
- Hanyu Pinyin: Mìshū shěng / Bìshū shěng
- Wade–Giles: Mi^{4}-shu^{1} sheng^{3} / Pi^{4}-shu^{1} sheng^{3}

Directorate of the Palace Library
- Traditional Chinese: 秘書監 or 祕書監
- Simplified Chinese: 秘书监 or 祕书监
Transcriptions
Standard Mandarin
- Hanyu Pinyin: Mìshū jiān / Bìshū jiān
- Wade–Giles: Mi^{4}-shu^{1} chien^{1} / Pi^{4}-shu^{1} chien^{1}

Court of the Palace Library
- Traditional Chinese: 秘書寺 or 祕書寺
- Simplified Chinese: 秘书寺 or 祕书寺
Transcriptions
Standard Mandarin
- Hanyu Pinyin: Mìshū sì / Bìshū sì
- Wade–Giles: Mi^{4}-shu^{1} ssu^{4} / Pi^{4}-shu^{1} ssu^{4}

The office was in existence for the most part from the mid-200s CE (Cao Wei) to 1380 (Ming dynasty). Over the millennia there were five names for this office:

- Directorate of the Palace Library (秘書監): during the Three Kingdoms, the Liao dynasty, the Jin dynasty (1115–1234) and the Yuan dynasty
- Court of the Palace Library (秘書寺): between c. 300 to c. 464 (Jin dynasty (266–420), Northern Wei, Liu Song, etc.)
- Department of the Palace Library (秘書省): during the Northern and Southern dynasties, the Sui dynasty, most of the Tang dynasty, the Five Dynasties and Ten Kingdoms, the Song dynasty and the Ming dynasty
- Orchid Pavilion (蘭臺; "Lantai"): used during the Tang dynasty between 662 and 670
- Unicorn Pavilion (麟臺; "Lintai"): used during the Tang dynasty and the Wu Zhou between 684 and 712

In addition to preserving the emperor's official documents, the agency was sometimes also tasked with compiling or editing historical records and state calendars. Before the Sui dynasty, it also handled documents flowing into and out of the imperial palace, making it interchangeable with the Secretariat. During the late Tang dynasty (after the early 700s) and the Song dynasty, the office was largely non-functional and staffed by eminent officials for sinecure purposes.

The office during the Tang dynasty was headed by one director (秘書監) and two vice directors (秘書少監) and, during the Song dynasty, by one director and one vice director. The office was also staffed with assistant directors (秘書丞) and assistants (秘書郎 or 秘書郎中). During the Yuan dynasty, the office was headed by four chief ministers (秘書卿), two directors (秘書太監), two vice directors, and two assistant directors (秘書丞 or 秘書監丞), all eunuchs.

== Korea ==
- Department of the Palace Library
- Hangul: 비서성
- Hanja: 秘書省
- RR: Biseoseong
- MR: Pisŏsŏng

Directorate of the Palace Library
- Hangul: 비서감
- Hanja: 秘書監
- RR: Biseogam
- MR: Pisŏgam

Modeled after the Chinese institution, the office also existed in Goryeo dynasty under several names:

- As Department of the Inner Library (內書省; "Naeseo Seong"): from 918 to 995
- As Department of the Palace Library: from 995 to 1298
- As Directorate of the Palace Library: from 1298 to 1308 and from 1356 to 1362
- As Office of Proofreading Documents (典校署; "Jeongyo Seo"): from 1308 to 1356
- As Court of Proofreading Documents (典校寺; "Jeongyo Sa"): from 1362 to 1392

In general, the office was staffed by 1 supervisor (判事; "pansa"), 1 director (監 or 令), 1 vice director (少監 or 副令), 2 assistant directors (丞) and 1 assistant (郎).

== Vietnam ==
The Palace Library Office (Hán-Nôm: 秘書所, Bí thư sở) of the Nguyễn dynasty was one of the four sở of the cabinet of the Nguyễn dynasty. It was first established under the reign of the Minh Mạng Emperor under the name Palace Library Section (秘書曹, Bí thư tào) and would retain its final form during the reign of the Thiệu Trị Emperor. The Palace Library Office of the Southern Court took care of the copying of poems and documents, preserving important documents, such as official correspondence with other countries, national maps, and public bibliographies.
