= Viện cơ mật =

Privy Council of Vietnam (1834–1945)

Cơ mật viện
- 機密院
- Seal of the Privy Council (機密院印)

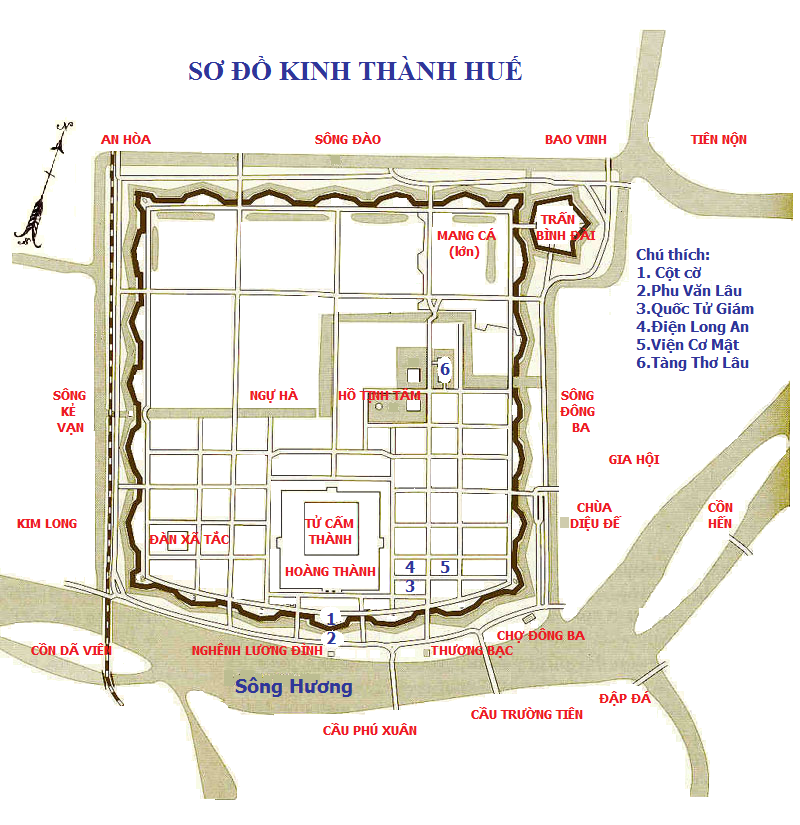
- Map showing the council marked as "5" in the southeast corner.

Agency overview
- Formed: 1834
- Dissolved: 1945
- Jurisdiction: Vietnam
- Agency executive: Resident-Superior of Annam (1897—1945)

The Viện cơ mật (Privy Council; chữ Hán: 機密院; French: Conseil privé, Conseil d’État, Chambre haute), established in 1834, was the Privy Council and key mandarin agency of the imperial court of Vietnam's final Nguyễn dynasty at Huế, until the end of the dynasty in 1945.

== History ==
The Minh Mạng Emperor established the Cơ mật viện (Privy Council) along with the Nội các (Grand Secretariat) as the main agencies of court administration. The Privy Council, comprised four of the most senior mandarins. Minh Mạng based the relationship of the Nội các and Cơ mật viện on the relationship of the corresponding Grand Secretariat and Grand Council within the bureaucratic framework of the Qing dynasty in China.

In the year 1834, Minh Mạng's political project was expanded to Cambodia in Siamese–Vietnamese War (1833–1834) , the Siamese army attacked from the Vietnam-Laos border down to Hà Tiên province. At the same time there were widespread rebellions from Cao Bằng province to Gia Định province. These situations forced the Minh Mạng Emperor to work with a smaller and more flexible close-knit group as he needed to discuss classified communications, military emergencies, and rapid response to the war situation. This was the reason why the Cơ mật viện was established.

The Privy Council was originally located in the Tả Vu building in Imperial palace. After the fall of Huế in 1885, it was moved outside of palace and located to the office of the Ministry of Rites, then the Ministry of War, and finally in 1903, it was moved to the Giác Hoàng pagoda ground. Giác Hoàng Pagoda was demolished to build the new building of Privy Council, along with the building on the left of the Economic Museum and the building on the right of the ministries' caretaker offices, collectively known as the Three Buildings and finished in 1903. This location is currently located at 23 Tong Duy Tan, Thuan Thanh Ward, in the southeast corner inside the Hue Citadel.

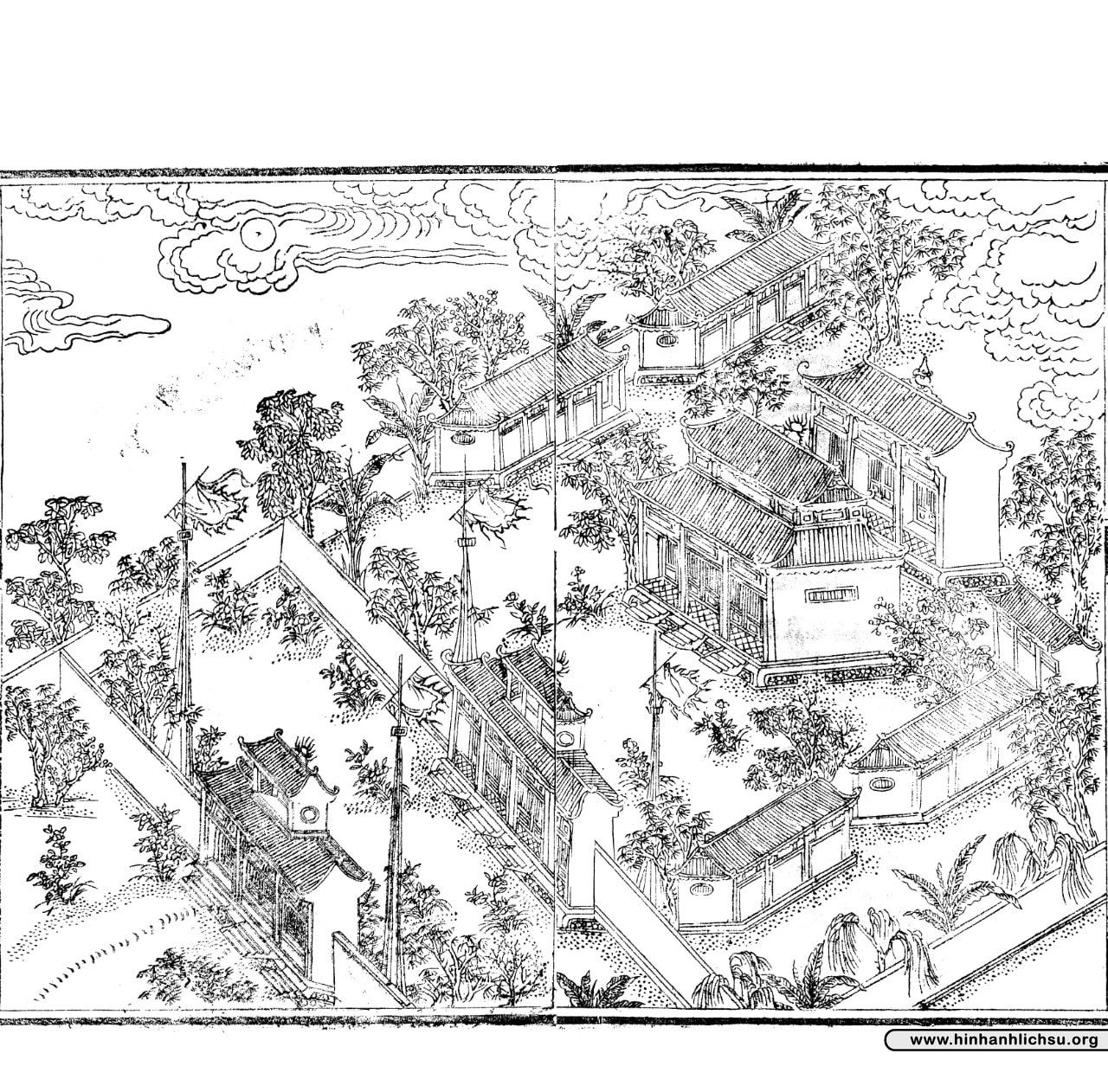
Painting of Giác Hoàng pagoda in 1840s, later demolished and now the current headquarter of Privy Council in 1903.

In 1897 the Resident-Superior of Annam was granted the power to appoint the Nguyễn dynasty Emperors and presided over the meetings of the Viện cơ mật. These moves incorporated French officials directly into the administrative structure of the Imperial Huế Court and further legitimised French rule in the legislative branch of the Nguyễn government.

== Bắc ty and Nam ty ==
The Cơ mật Viện was divided into two offices, the Bắc ty (北司, "Northern office") and the Nam ty (南司, "Southern office"). The Bắc ty was in charge of affairs relating to the area ranging from everything north of the southern border of the Hà Tĩnh province and the Nam ty was in charge on everything south of the northern border of the Quảng Bình province.

Each Ty had 1 Deputy Director of the Bureau (員外郎, Viên Ngoại lang), trật Chánh ngũ phẩm, 1 Chủ sự trật Chánh lục phẩm, 2 Tư vụ hoặc Biên tu, trật Chánh thất phẩm, and an inspector (Kiểm thảo), trật Tòng thất phẩm.

== Seals ==
Immediate after the Cơ mật Viện was established during the reign of the Minh Mạng Emperor a seal was issued for the institution, this seal bore the seal script inscription Cơ mật viện ấn (機密院印), was made from silver, and had a seal knob shaped like a camel. The great seal of the Cơ mật Viện during the reign of the Minh Mạng Emperor was 7 cm by 7 cm in size, while the Cơ mật viện ấn seal seen during the reign of the Đồng Khánh Emperor was only 5 cm x 5 cm. During the reign of the Đồng Khánh Emperor a new great seal was made with the inscription Cơ mật chi ấn (機密之印) and a kiềm ấn (small seal) with the inscription Cơ mật (機密) that was 3 cm x 3 cm. During the reign of the Bảo Đại Emperor the great seal had an inscription that read Cơ mật viện ấn (機密院印) and was 6,7 cm x 6,7 cm and the kiềm ấn was 2,8 cm x 2,8 cm.

== Gallery ==
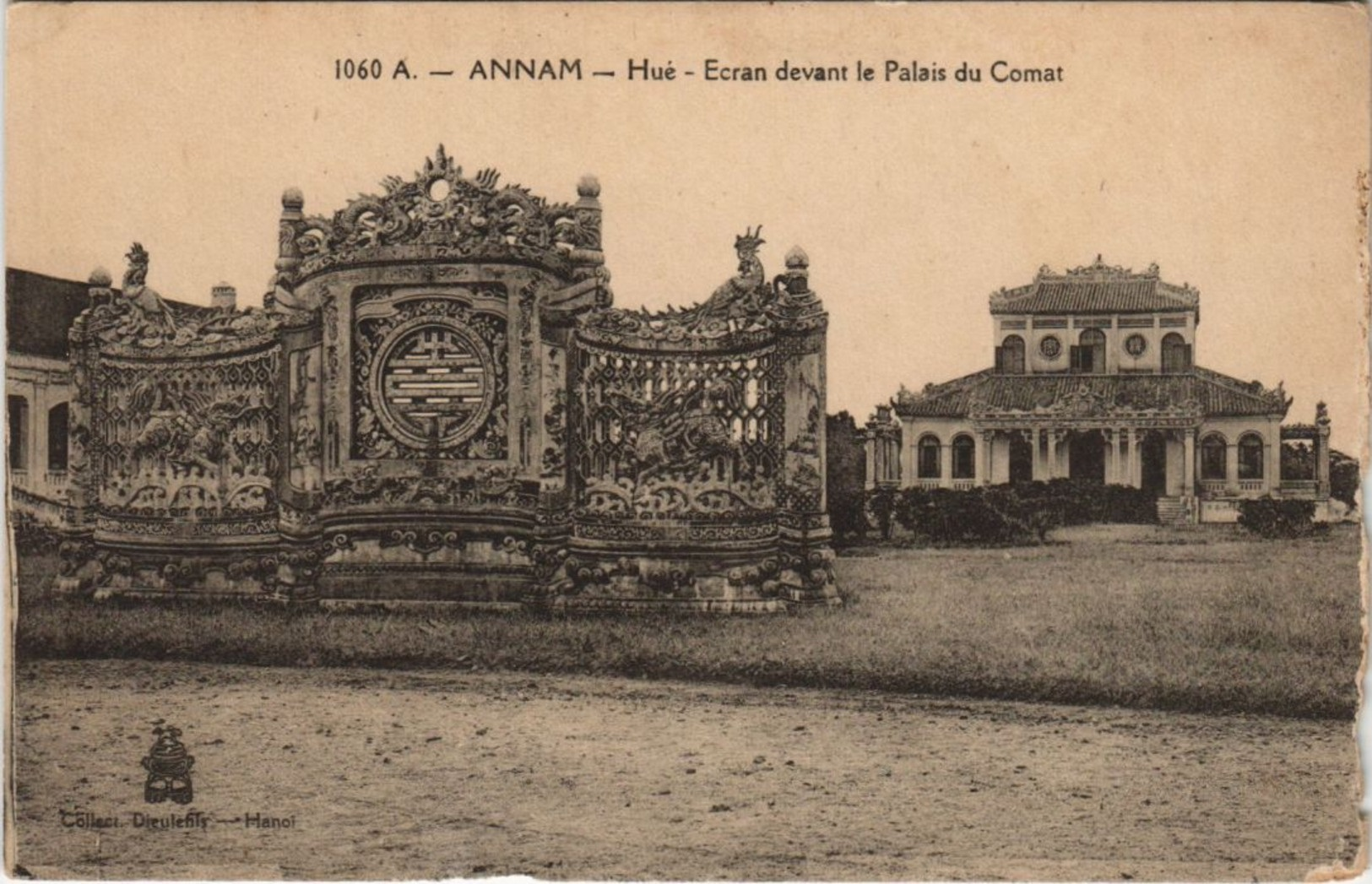
Bình phong wall (屏風) of privy council.

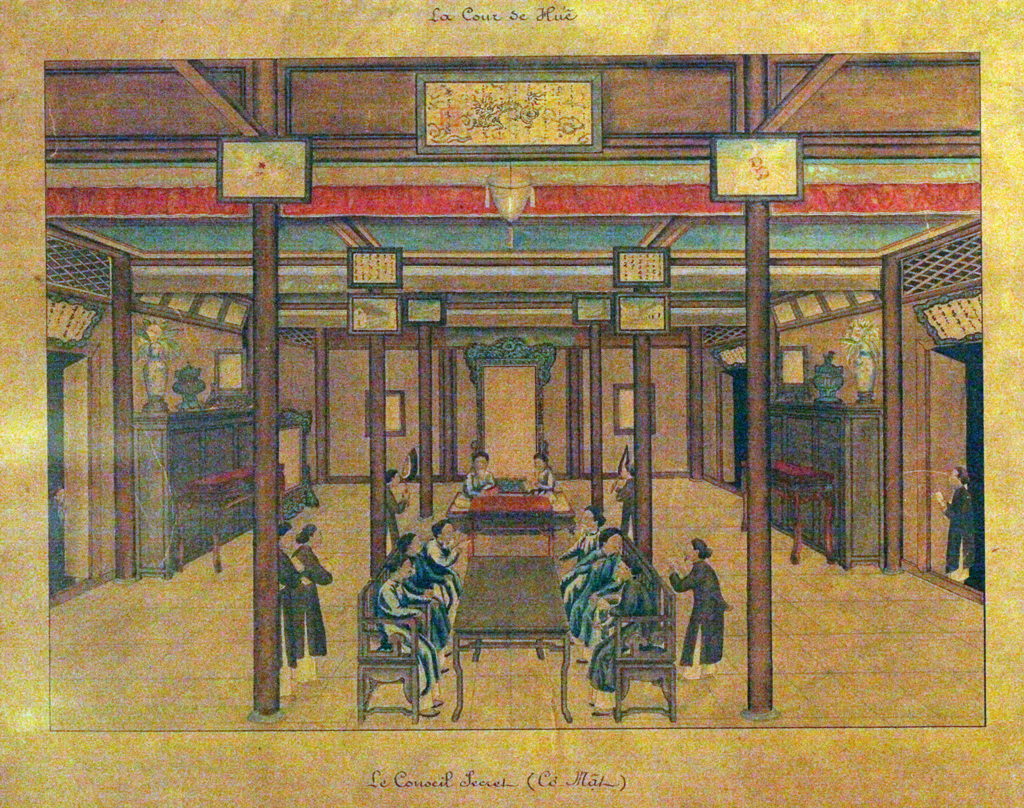
Privy council of the Nguyen dynasty (Cơ Mật Viện: 機密院).

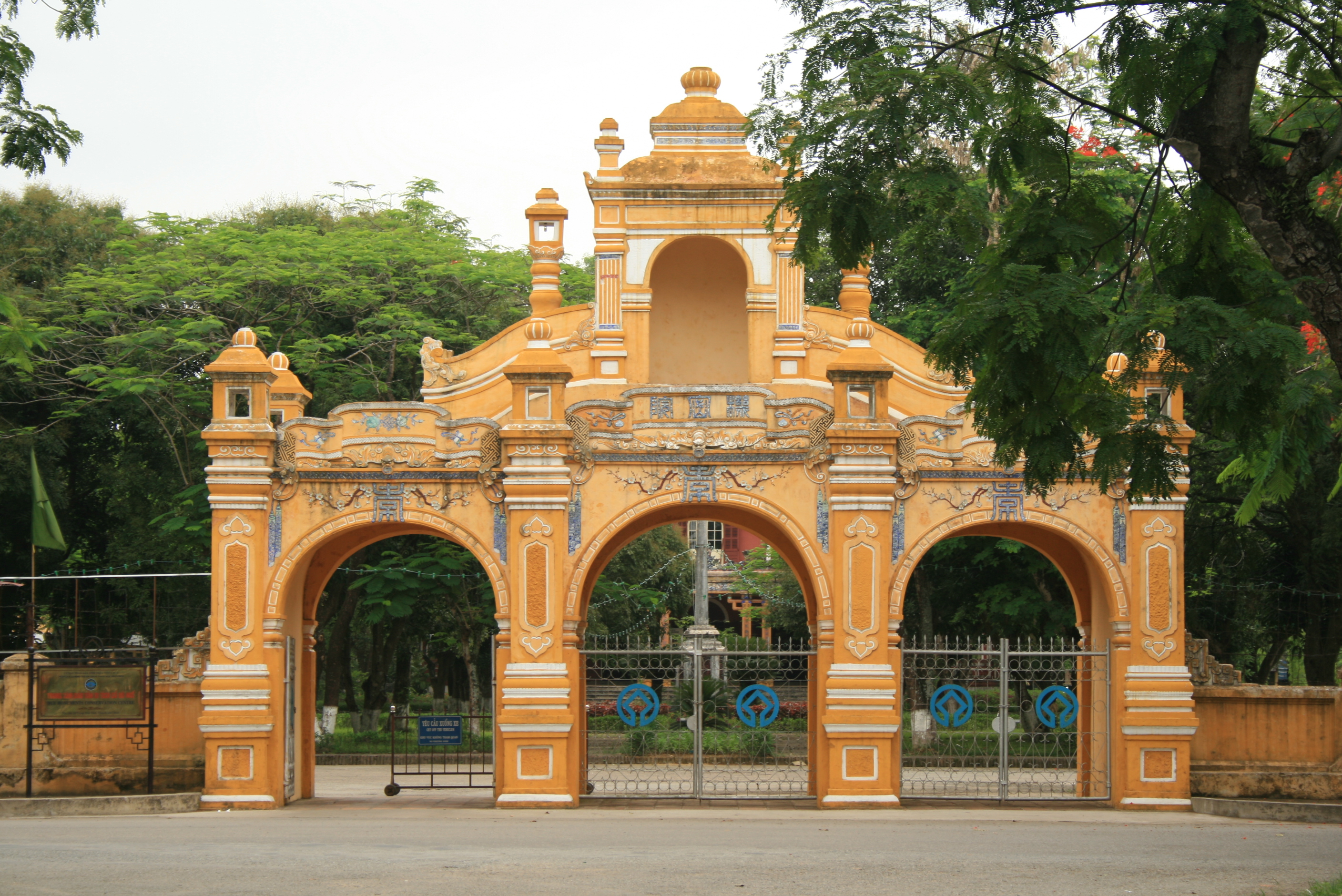
The entrance of the privy council.

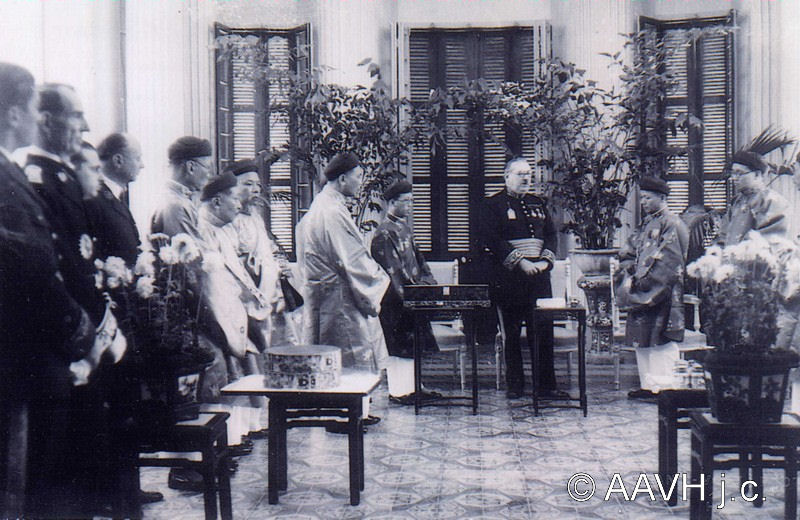
Maurice Fernand Graffeuil, governor of Annam visited privy council in 1936.

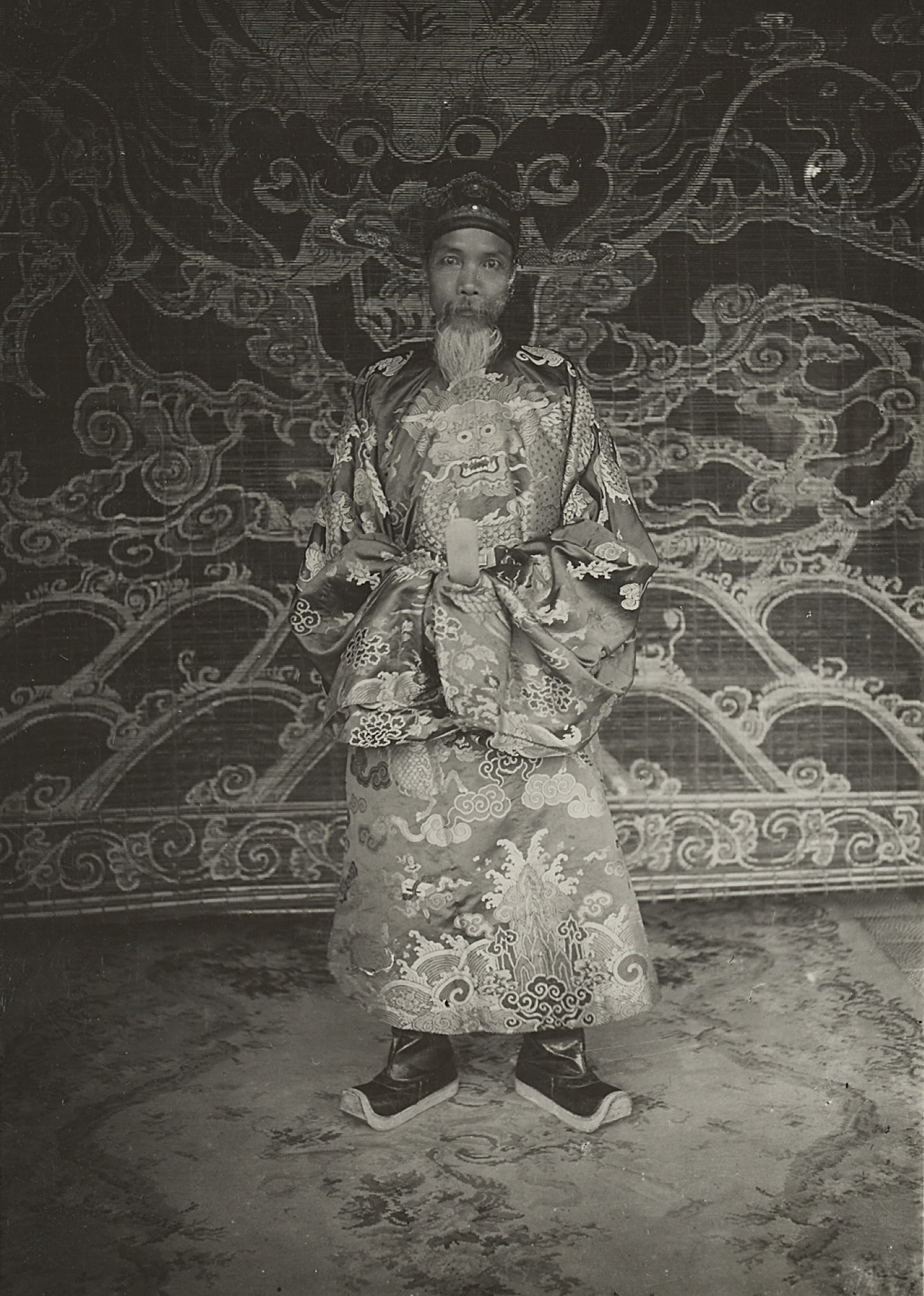
Hồ Đắc Trung, member of Nội các council that governed the privy council.

== Sources ==
- ThS. Hà Văn Huề, ThS. Nguyễn Thị Thu Hường, ThS. Đoàn Thị Thu Thuỷ, PGS.TS Nguyễn Công Việt - Ấn chương trên Châu bản triều Nguyễn. - Năm xuất bản : 2013 Nhà xuất bản : (NXB Hà Nội Cuốn sách). (in Vietnamese).
