= List of administrators of the French protectorate of Annam =

Resident-Superior of Annam
- Résident supérieur de l'Annam (French); Khâm sứ Trung Kỳ (Vietnamese) 欽使中圻 (chữ Hán)
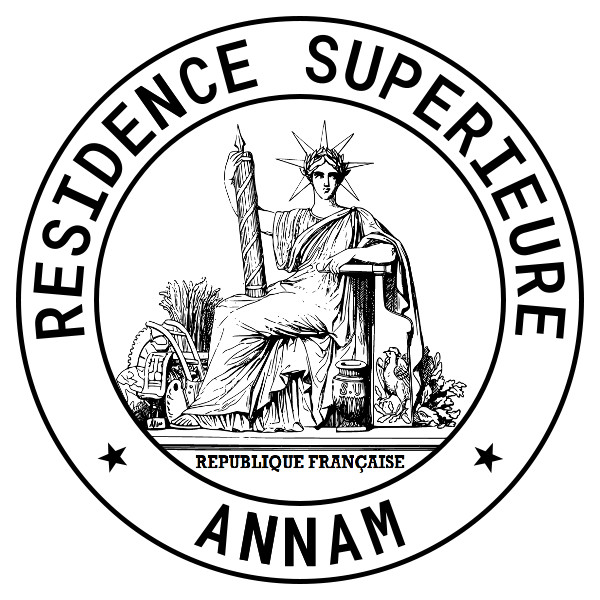
- The seal of the resident-superior of the French protectorate of Annam

- Reports to: Governor-General of French Indochina
- Seat: Huế
- Precursor: Resident-General of Annam and Tonkin
- Formation: 8 April 1886
- First holder: Charles Dillon
- Final holder: Georges Armand Léon Gautier (as High Commissioner in Vietnam)

The position of Resident-Superior of Annam (French: Résident supérieur de l'Annam; Vietnamese: Khâm sứ Trung Kỳ; chữ Hán: 欽使中圻) was established on 8 April 1886 as a successor to the Resident-General of Annam and Tonkin (résident général de l'Annam et du Tonkin) when it was decided to have one French resident for the French protectorate of Annam and a separate one for Tonkin. Although the emperors of the Nguyễn dynasty were still nominally in control of the protectorates of Annam and Tonkin, the resident-superior of Annam gradually gained more influence over the imperial court in Huế. In 1897 the resident-superior was granted the power to appoint the Nguyễn dynasty emperors and presided over the meetings of the Viện cơ mật. These moves incorporated French officials directly into the administrative structure of the Imperial Huế Court and further legitimised French rule in the legislative branch of the Nguyễn government. From this period onwards any imperial edicts issued by the emperors of Đại Nam had to be confirmed by the resident-superior of Annam giving him both legislative and executive power over the Nguyễn government.

In 1898 the federal government of French Indochina took over the financial and property management duties of the Nguyễn dynasty's imperial court, meaning that the Nguyễn dynasty emperor (at the time Thành Thái) became a salaried employee of the Indochinese colonial structure, reducing their power to being only a civil servant of the protectorate government. The resident-superior of Annam also took over the management of provincial mandarins and was a member of the Supreme Council (Conseil supérieur) of the Government-General of French Indochina.

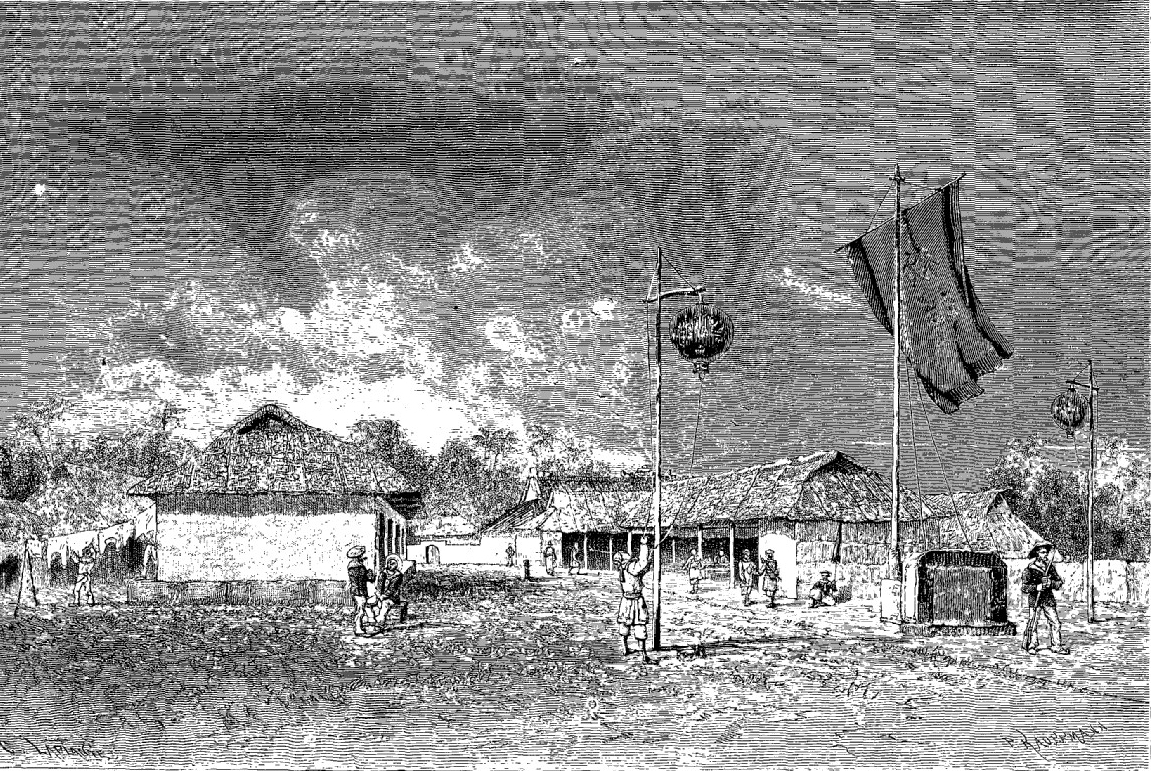
Resident building of French governor of Annam in 1875

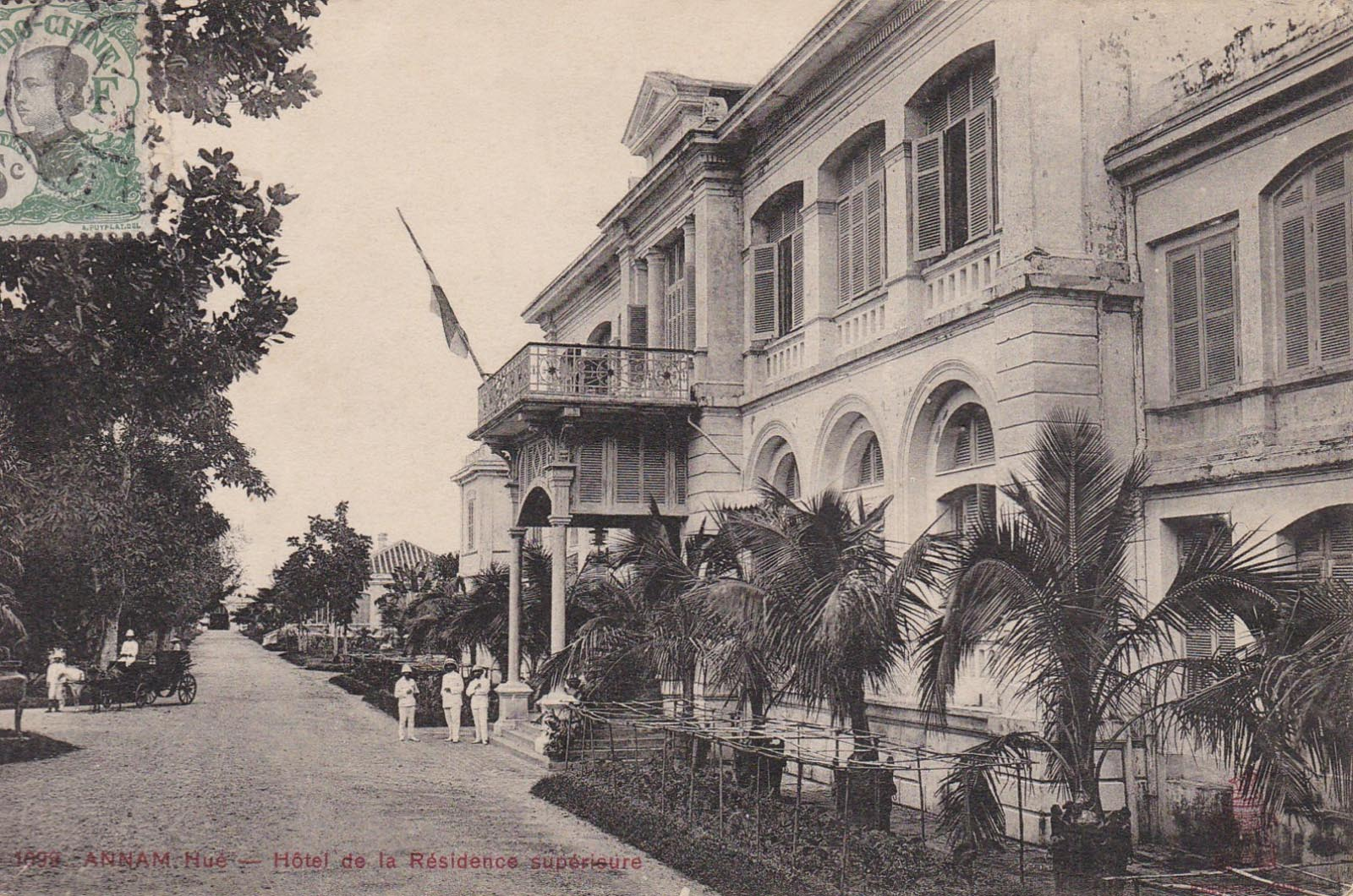
Resident building of French governor of Annam

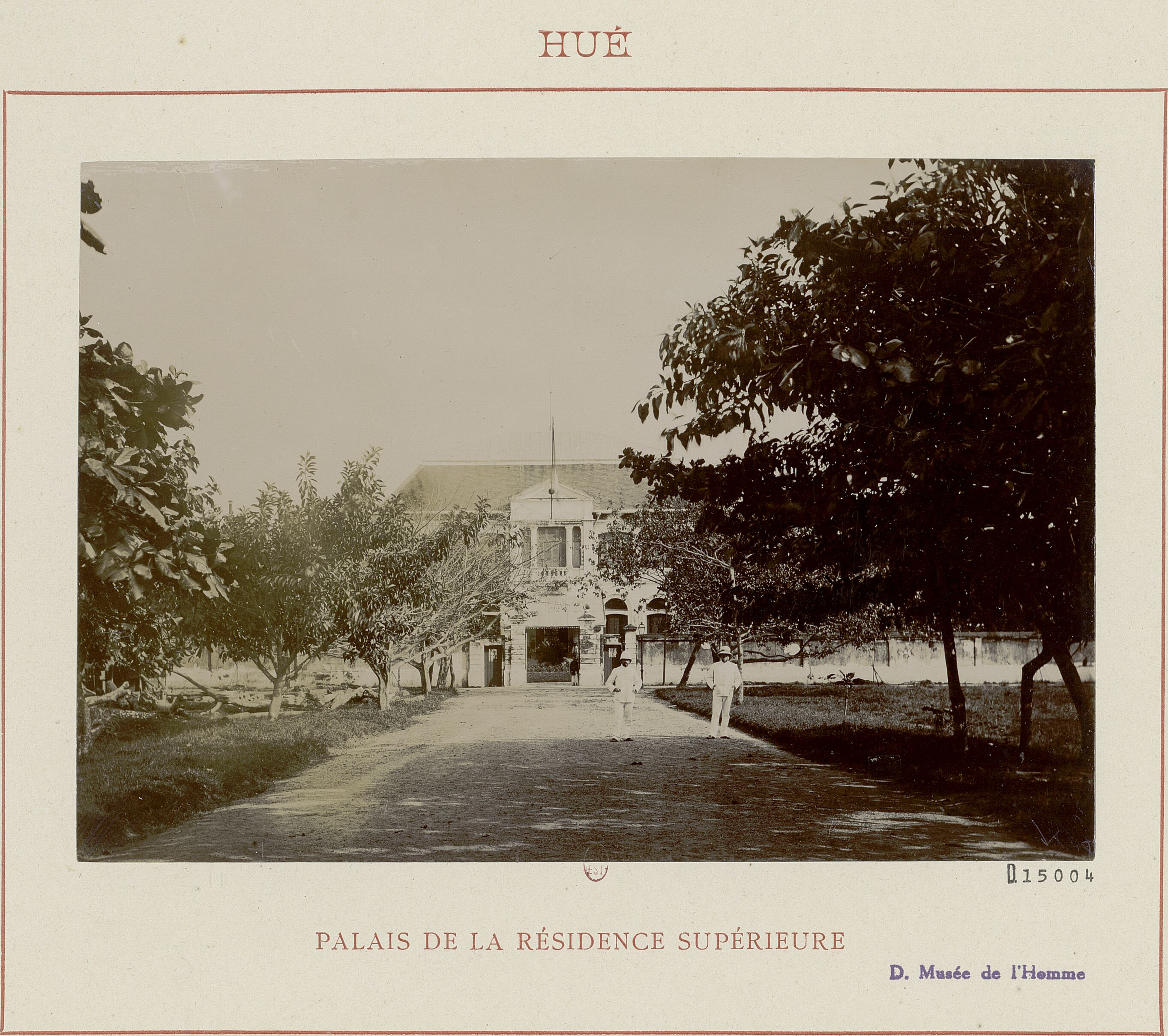
Facade of Resident building.

== List ==
List of administrators of the French protectorate of Annam

(Dates in italics indicate de facto continuation of office)

Tenure	Incumbent	Notes
French Suzerainty
8 April 1886 to 1888	Charles Dillon, Resident-Superior	In Huế; the city became permanent administrative seat
1888 to 1889	Séraphin Hector, Acting Resident-Superior	1st time
May 1889	Léon Jean Laurent Chavassieux, Acting Resident-Superior	
10 May 1889 to 27 October 1891	Séraphin Hector, Resident-Superior	2nd time
27 October 1891 to 11 April 1894	Ernest Albert Brière, Resident-Superior	1st time
11 April 1894 to 27 November 1894	Léon Jules Pol Boulloche, Acting Resident-Superior	1st time
28 November 1894 to 26 April 1895	Charles-Frédéric Baille, Acting Resident-Superior	
27 April 1895 to 1 January 1897	Ernest Albert Brière, Resident-Superior	2nd time
1 February 1897 to 7 March 1898	Jean Calixte Alexis Auvergne, Acting Resident-Superior	1st time
7 March 1898 to 1900	Léon Jules Pol Boulloche, Resident-Superior	2nd time
22 February 1900 to 1902	Jean Calixte Alexis Auvergne, Acting Resident-Superior	2nd time, acting to 9 May 1901
1902 to 1903	Louis Paul Luce, Acting Resident-Superior	
1903 to August 1904	Jean Calixte Alexis Auvergne, Resident-Superior	3rd time
1904 to 1906	Jean-Ernest Moulié, Interim Resident-Superior	
1906 to July 1908	Ernest Fernand Lévecque, Resident-Superior	
July 1908 to 1910	Élie Jean-Henri Groleau, Resident-Superior	
1910 to 1 January 1912	Henri Victor Sestier, Resident-Superior	
1 January 1912 to 15 May 1913	Georges Marie Joseph Mahé, Resident-Superior	
16 May 1913 to 16 May 1916	Jean-François dit Eugène Charles, Resident-Superior	1st time, acting to 17 May 1914
16 May 1916 to 27 January 1917	Henri Le Marchant de Trigon, Interim Resident-Superior	
27 January 1917 to May 1919	Jean-François dit Eugène Charles, Resident-Superior	2nd time
8 May 1919 to 5 May 1921	Honoré Louis Joseph Tissot, Interim Resident-Superior	
5 May 1921 to 1927	Pierre Marie Antonie Pasquier, Resident-Superior	
20 May 1922 to 11 September 1922	Jules Friès, Acting Resident-Superior	Acting for Pasquier
13 January 1924 to 28 September 1924	Aristide Eugène Le Fol, Acting Resident-Superior	Acting for Pasquier
4 October 1926 to 13 February 1927	Jean Charles Joseph d'Elloy, Interim Resident-Superior	
13 February 1927 to 1929	Jules Friès, Resident-Superior	
5 January 1929 to 1931	Aristide Eugène Le Fol, Resident-Superior	
23 May 1929 to 28 February 1930	Pierre Charles Edmond Jabouille, Acting Resident-Superior	Acting for Le Fol
11 June 1931 to 25 February 1933	Yves Charles Châtel, Resident-Superior	Acting to 21 November 1931
25 February 1933 to 27 June 1934	Léon Emmanuel Thibaudeau, Interim Resident-Superior	
27 July 1934 to June 1941	Maurice Fernand Graffeuil, Resident-Superior	
15 May 1936 to 16 April 1937	Eugène Guillemain, Acting Resident-Superior	Acting for Graffeuil
18 June 1941 to August 1944	Émile Louis François Grandjean, Resident-Superior	
23 August 1944 to 9 March 1945	Jean Maurice Norbert Haelewyn, Resident-General	Japanese prisoner 9 March 1945 - 23 August 1945
Japanese Suzerainty
March 1945 to August 1945	Yokoyama Masayuki, Supreme Adviser	
French Suzerainty
24 August 1945 to 1947	Jean Henri Arsène Cédile, Commissioner	
1947	Georges Edouard Jules Marie Saint-Mleux, Acting Commissioner	
20 May 1947 to 1949	Henri Pierre Joseph Marie Lebris, Interim Commissioner	
8 August 1949 to 22 August 1949	Claude Léon Raoul Vally, Acting Commissioner	
22 August 1949 to 1951	Général Lorillon, Commissioner	
1951 to 27 April 1953	Georges Émile LeBlanc, Commissioner	
27 April 1953 to 1954?	Georges Armand Léon Gautier, High Commissioner in Vietnam	

== See also ==
- History of Vietnam
- Annam (French protectorate)
- French colonial empire
