= Bùi Bằng Đoàn =

Vietnamese politician

His Excellency Bùi Bằng Đoàn (裴鵬摶)
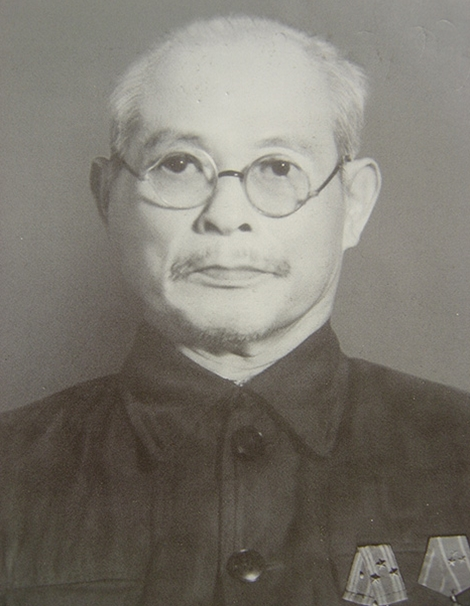

2nd Chairman of the National Assembly of the Democratic Republic of Vietnam
- In office 9 November 1946 – 13 April 1955
- President: Hồ Chí Minh
- Preceded by: Nguyễn Văn Tố
- Succeeded by: Tôn Đức Thắng

Member of the Council of State
- In office 2 March 1946 – 8 November 1946
- President: Hồ Chí Minh

Special Inspector for the Government of the Democratic Republic of Vietnam
- In office 6 January 1946 – 8 November 1946
- President: Hồ Chí Minh

Minister of Justice of the Nguyễn dynasty
- In office 1933–1945
- Monarch: Emperor Bảo Đại
- Preceded by: Tôn Thất Đàn
- Succeeded by: Trịnh Đình Thảo

Personal details
- Born: 11 September 1889 Liên Bạt, Ứng Hòa, Hà Nội province, Tonkin, French Indochina
- Died: 13 April 1955 (aged 65) Hanoi, Democratic Republic of Vietnam
- Spouse: Đoàn Thị Đức
- Children: Bùi Tín; Bùi Nghĩa
- Education: Trường Hậu bổ in Hanoi (Mandarin school)
- Profession: Politician

Bùi Bằng Đoàn (Vietnamese pronunciation: [ʔɓuj˨˩ ʔɓaŋ˨˩ ʔɗwaːn˨˩]; Chữ Hán: 裴鵬摶; 11 September 1889 – 13 April 1955) was a Vietnamese politician. He led the League for the National Union of Vietnam (Hội Liên hiệp quốc dân Việt Nam/Liên Việt) 1946–1951 and was Chairman of the National Assembly of Vietnam.

Bùi Bằng Đoàn started his political career as a mandarin working for the Confucian bureaucracy of the Southern dynasty in Tonkin, starting his career in 1913 as a district magistrate working up to become minister of justice for Annam in 1933. Following the August Revolution the chairman of the Indochinese Communist Party Hồ Chí Minh invited him to become a special inspector in the newly established government of the Democratic Republic of Vietnam where he would later be elected to become a member of the Standing Committee of the National Assembly on 6 January 1946.

Bùi Bằng Đoàn's son Bùi Tín, a senior Communist Party editor, defected to France in 1990.

== Biography ==
Bùi Bằng Đoàn descended from a line of prominent mandarins, his father was a Tuần Vũ (high-ranking military mandarin) and his grandfather received the title of Thủ-Khoa in the imperial examination system during the reign of the Minh Mạng, Tiến-sĩ during the reign of Thiệu Trị, and was the Tổng Ðốc of Bắc Ninh province during the reign of Tự Đức with the rank of Thái-tử-Thiếu-bảo.

=== Career as a mandarin in the Southern dynasty ===
In 1907 Bùi Bằng Đoàn started his education at the Trường Hậu bổ in Hanoi and in 1911 he graduated with the highest grades in the school. He got the degree of Cử nhân (舉人, senior bachelor) during the reign of Thành Thái. In school it was clear that he was exceptionally intelligent with his strongest skill being mathematics (especially algebra), he was further quite adept in French.

His career as a Mandarin of the government of the Nguyễn dynasty in the French protectorate of Tonkin started as a Tri-huyện (知縣, "district magistrate") of the Xuân Trường district in the Nam Định province. His family inferred a strict moral discipline into him telling him that he may not accept gifts from anyone and that if he ever received a gift that he would have to return it. During his time as district magistrate in the Xuân Trường district he implemented the construction of the Bạch Long (白龍, "White dragon") dyke to prevent salt water from contaminating the area to help agricultural production allowing for productive rice and strawberry fields to grow in the area. In recognition of his merits, the people of the Xuân Trường district made a sacrifice for the young "parent of the people" (父母之民, phụ mẫu chi dân) right at the place where he took office.

Between 1913 and 1925 he occupied 5 positions as a Tri-huyện and 2 as a Tri-phủ.

In 1925, in response to press condemnation of the brutal exploitation of plantation workers in French Cochinchina, the government of Southern dynasty sent Bùi Bằng Đoàn to French Cochinchina to inspect the French rubber plantations. There he conducted a thorough inspection, writing a 100-page report in French highlighting the absurdities of the policies of the plantation owners. The relevant recommendations of the report were accepted by the authorities, reducing the harsh regimes for rubber plantation workers at that time. In 1925 Bùi Bằng Đoàn was sent to Hanoi to act as an interpreter for the felony trial in the case of Phan Bội Châu, Bùi Bằng Đoàn clearly and honestly translated Phan Bội Châu's words and strong arguments so that his sentence would be reduced to being under public house arrest in Huế.

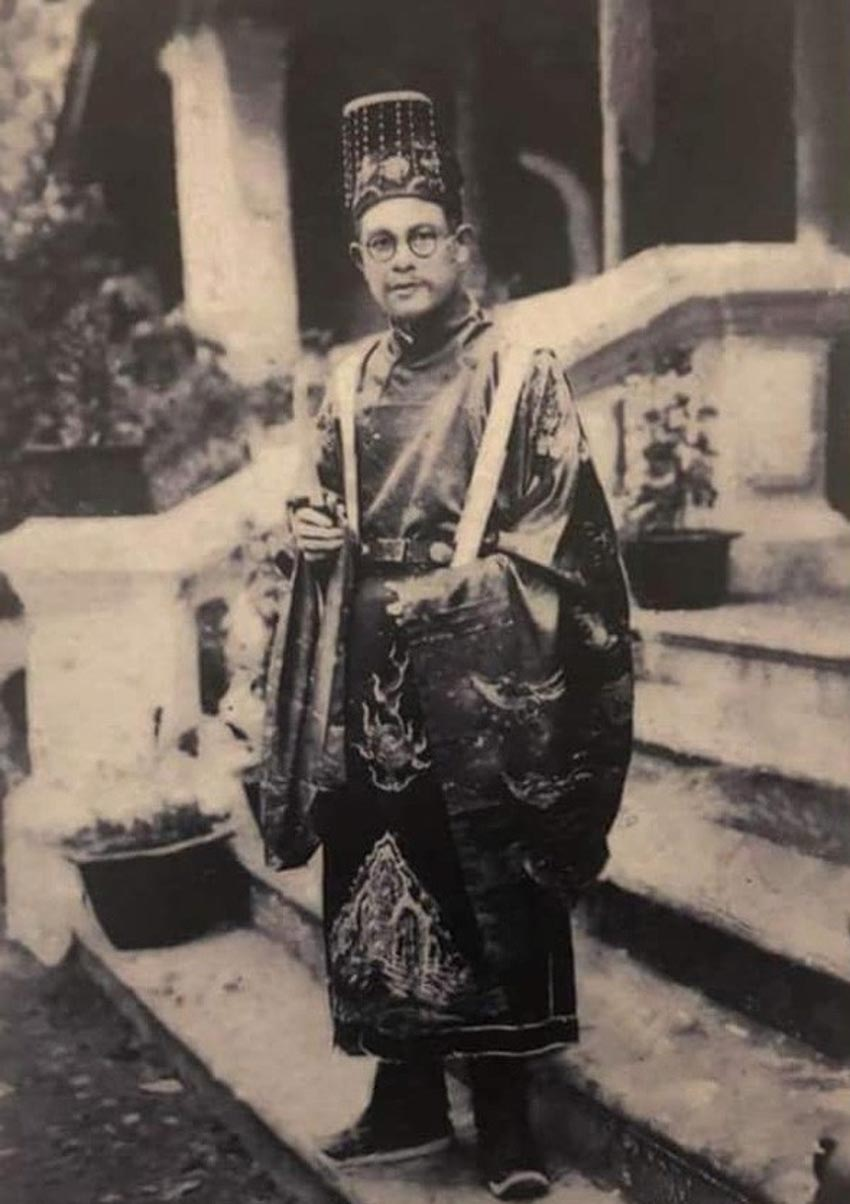
His excellence Bùi Bằng Đoàn in ceremonial costume during the Nam Giao Ceremony in Huế (1942).

In 1926 he got promoted to the position of the Surveillance Commissioner (Án sát) of the Bắc Ninh province and in 1928 he was promoted to be the Tuần phủ of the Cao Bằng province.

In 1930 he was charged with the functions of President of the Provincial Court in Bắc Ninh, functions which had been entrusted since the beginning of the judicial reform in Tonkin (1917) to French magistrates or civil service administrators.

In 1932 he again became the Tuần phủ of the Cao Bằng province and in 1933 he also became the Tuần phủ of the Bắc Ninh province. In 1933 the Bảo Đại Emperor appointed him to the position of Minister (Thượng thư) of the Ministry of Justice by recommendation of Phạm Quỳnh.

Following the Japanese coup d'état in French Indochina in March 1945 Bùi Bằng Đoàn resigned his position as minister of justice as he didn't want to be a part of the Japanese puppet government and returned to his hometown. However, the government of the Southern dynasty invited him to take up the position of Chief Justice of the High Court of Hanoi. During the "night before" of the August Revolution, the Việt Minh contacted him and invited to become the president of the association to protect political prisoners, which he accepted.

=== Career in the Democratic Republic of Vietnam ===
Following the August Revolution Bùi Bằng Đoàn was invited by President Hồ Chí Minh to attend the announcement of the Declaration of independence of the Democratic Republic of Vietnam at the Ba Đình flower garden (now the Ba Đình Square) in Hanoi on 2 September 1945. At the ceremony he met Hồ and later Hồ would invite him to join the revolutionary government. Bằng Đoàn recounted his experiences with Hồ Chí Minh to his children and grandchildren at his home soon after the event. Despite the invitation Bằng Đoàn wanted to "hang the seal of resignation" on peace in his hometown of Liên Bạt, where he lived on a plantation for a short while, but on 9 November 1945 he received a letter from President Hồ Chí Minh asking him to take charge of the water works of the Democratic Republic of Vietnam.

After this he left his hometown and joined the revolutionary government, where he held the following positions: advisor to the president, head of the Special Inspection Committee, member of the First National Assembly, and head of the Standing Committee of the National Assembly (the latter of which he held until his death). After the National Assembly Standing Committee had to be evacuated to a new location, for a while the headquarters of the National Standing Committee became his house in Liên Bạt, Ứng Hòa, Hà Đông province. During this period he became seriously ill and had to take a break from his work. While the French military was sweeping the area he encountered French soldiers in the Vân Đình district. At the time, his wife Đoàn Thị Đức was home alone, hiding the documents of the National Assembly and the Indochinese Communist Party when the French invaded their home and shot at her dead. He didn't learn of her demise until he returned home in 1946.

Bùi Bằng Đoàn was forced to retreat with the rest of the revolutionary government to the Việt Bắc area where he his relationship with President Hồ Chí Minh became closer causing the latter to write a classical Chinese poem for him. During his time in the forests and mountains of Việt Bắc he felt miserable and often encountered violence leading him to hand over some of his tasks to his deputies Tôn Đức Thắng and Tôn Quang Phiệt. While he was later far away from the war zone he still corresponded with and sent suggestions to the Central Committee and the Revolutionary Government on issues of concern to him. From time to time, Bằng Đoàn still gave interviews and wrote newspaper articles to encourage the troops and people to believe in the victory of their continued resistance to the French.

== Poems written between Hồ Chí Minh and Bùi Bằng Đoàn ==
He is also famous for his poetry exchange with President Hồ Chí Minh in 1948. Hồ gave him a poem in Traditional Chinese characters:

Sino-Vietnamese	Vietnamese translation	English translation
Khán thư sơn điểu thê song hãn Phê trát xuân hoa chiếu nghiễn trì Tiệp báo tần lai lao dịch mã Tư công tức cảnh tặng tân thi.	Xem sách chim rừng vào cửa đậu Phê văn hoa núi chiếu nghiên soi Tin vui thắng trận dồn chân ngựa Nhớ cụ thơ xuân tặng một bài.	See the book of wild birds at the gate Literature review of mountain flower mats and studies The good news of winning the horse-drawn battle Remember the old poet gave a song.

Bùi responded with the following poem:

Sino-Vietnamese	Vietnamese translation	English translation
Thiết thạch nhất tâm phù chủng tộc Giang sơn vạn lý thủ thành trì Tri công quốc sự vô dư hạ Thao bút nhưng thành thoái lỗ thi.	Sắt đá một lòng vì chủng tộc Non sông muôn dặm giữ cơ đồ Biết Người việc nước không hề rảnh Vung bút thành thơ đuổi giặc thù.	The whole iron heart backs the people rock-steadily Keeping citadels of the thousand-miles country Knowing you are not free cos of public affairs Swinging a pen into a poem to repel the enemy.

== Honours and decorations ==
Ribbon bar	Honour	Date and comment
	Commander of the Imperial Order of the Dragon of Annam	1934
	Commander of Agricultural merit	1936
	Commander of the Order of the Million Elephants and the White Parasol	1939
	Grand Commander of the Royal Order of Cambodia	1942
	Officer in the Legion of Honour	1942
	Order of Independence, 1st class	
	Resistance Order, 1st class	
