= Government of the Nguyễn dynasty =

Historic Vietnamese rulers

- Chánh-phủ Đại-Nam (政府大南); Chánh-phủ Nam-Triều (政府南朝); Gouvernement Impériál de l'Annam
- Heirloom Seal of the Southern Realm and coat of arms.

Overview
- Established: 1 June 1802
- Dissolved: 25 August 1945
- State: Nguyễn dynasty
- Leader: Emperor
- Appointed by: Emperor of the Nguyễn dynasty and the resident superior of Annam (1897–1945)
- Main organ: Thị Thư Viện, Thị Hàn viện, and Nội Hàn Viện (1802–1819); Văn thư phòng (1820–1829); Nội các (1829–1934); Viện cơ mật (1834–1945); Ngự tiền văn phòng (1934–1945)
- Headquarters: Imperial City of Huế

The government of the Nguyễn dynasty, officially the Southern Court (Vietnamese: Nam Triều; chữ Hán: 南朝) (Note: Could alternatively be translated as "Southern Court".) historicaly referred to as the Huế Court (Vietnamese: Triều đình Huế; chữ Hán: 朝廷化), centred around the Emperor (皇帝, Hoàng Đế) as the absolute monarch, surrounded by various imperial agencies and ministries which stayed under the emperor's presidency. Following the signing of the 1884 Patenôtre Treaty the French took over a lot of control and while the government of the Nguyễn dynasty still nominally ruled the French protectorates of Annam and Tonkin, in reality the French maintained control over these territories and the Nguyễn government became subsidiary to the administration of French Indochina. During World War II the Japanese launched a coup d'état ousting the French and establishing the Empire of Vietnam which was ruled by the Nguyễn government. During the August Revolution the Nguyễn government was abolished in the aftermath of World War II.

During the 1930s it was officially called the "Government of the Southern Court" (Chánh-phủ Nam-Triều).

== History ==
=== Establishment under Gia Long ===
After ascending to the throne the Gia Long Emperor adopted the organisational structure of the Revival Lê dynasty's government. From 1802 until 1906 the ministries of the imperial government of the Nguyễn dynasty consisted of the Ministry of Personnel (吏部, Lại Bộ), Ministry of Revenue (戶部, Hộ Bộ), Ministry of Rites (禮部, Lễ Bộ), Ministry of War (兵部, Binh Bộ), Ministry of Justice (刑部, Hình Bộ), and the Ministry of Public Works (工部, Công Bộ), these were known together as the Lục Bộ (六部).

=== Minh Mạng's reforms ===
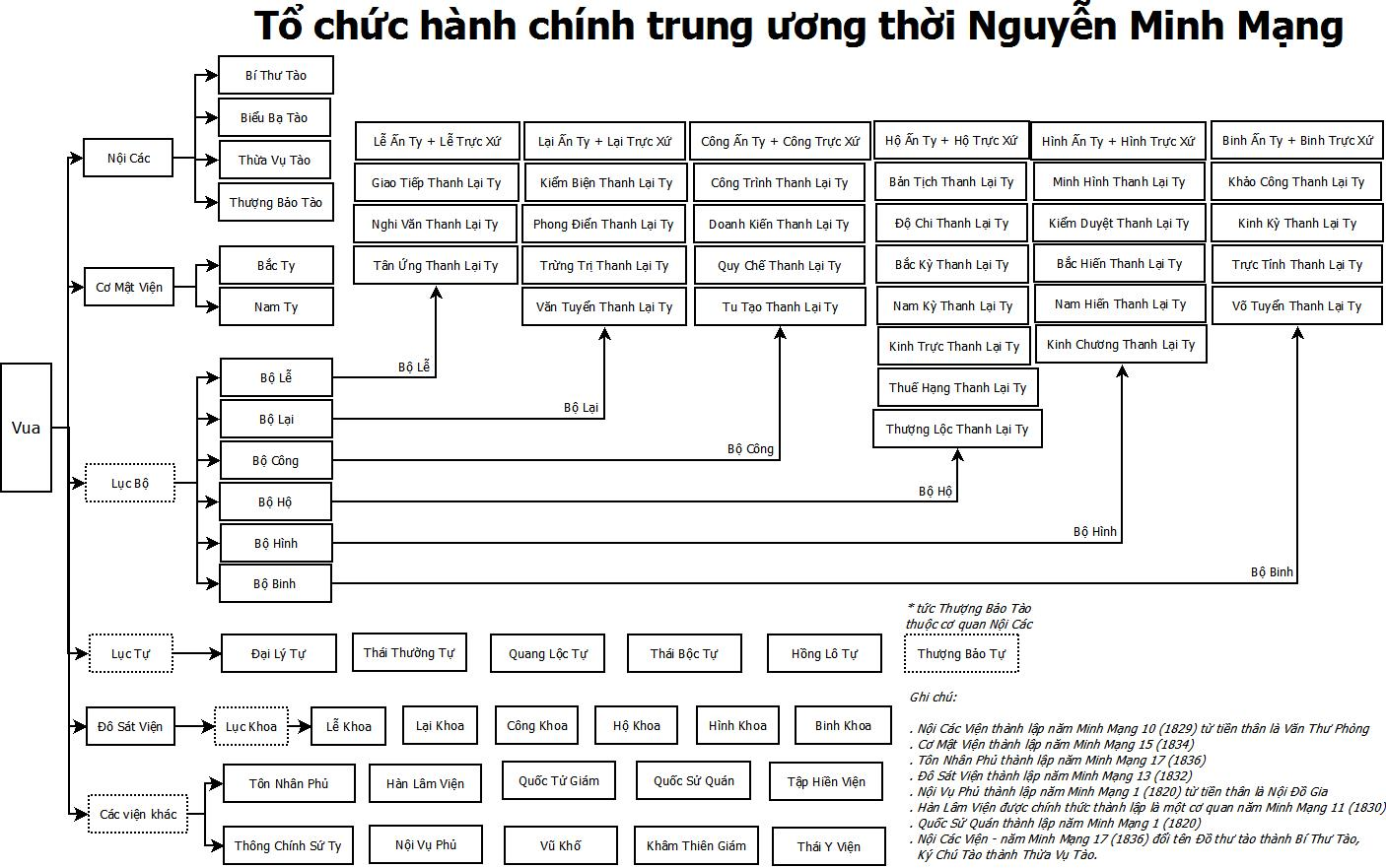
Organisation of the imperial government of the Nguyễn dynasty after the Minh Mạng reforms.

The reforms of Emperor Minh Mạng transformed the Vietnamese bureaucracy from a military apparatus created under Gia Long associated with generals, under the direction of the Công Đồng (公同, "Council"), mainly through top-down orders into a highly centralised meritocratic system. Minh Mạng's reforms to the Southern Court would remain largely unchanged until the Bảo Đại Emperor's reforms in 1933.

The administrative system of the Nguyễn dynasty was thinly spread across the country as the capital city of Huế is around 700 km from Hanoi and around 1000 km from Gia Định, the two most important economic centres of the country and most populous cities. Meaning that the imperial government had to spread diverse functions such as management tools, including directories, demographics, taxes, information tools, and administrative data storage systems across a vast territory. In order to better coordinate and communicate between the vastly distant and different regions of the country the Minh Mạng Emperor set up government stations and communication systems throughout his realm.

After ascending the throne in 1820, all of Minh Mạng's actions during his first decade on the throne were to the administrative apparatus (especially bureaucracies) to be prepared to replace the "low-literate" (ít chữ nghĩa) military generals, from 1831 to 1834 these changes would be implemented on a national scale. One of his first reforms to change the militaristic nature of the government of the Nguyễn dynasty was to establish two specialised agencies for communicating between Huế and the regions, namely the Bưu Chính ty and the Thông Chính ty. Before these tasks were done by the Ministry of War.

At the same time, in the first year of coming to power, the Minh Mạng Emperor reorganised the bureaucracy of the imperial court by consolidating the different cabinets into the Văn thư phòng (文書房). In 1829 the Văn thư phòng was replaced with the Nội các (內閣, "Cabinet"). This was because Minh Mạng understood the way how the government of the Manchu Qing dynasty in China functioned and used them as a model for establishing the Nội các and the Cơ mật viện (機密院, "Secret Institute"), based on the Nội các and Quân cơ xứ (軍機處) of the Qing. In the centralised administrations of China and Vietnam, the Emperor theoretically holds absolute power in all decisions. But in reality, he relies on an intricate bureaucratic apparatus below him to provide him with information, gather data, and prepare all agendas.

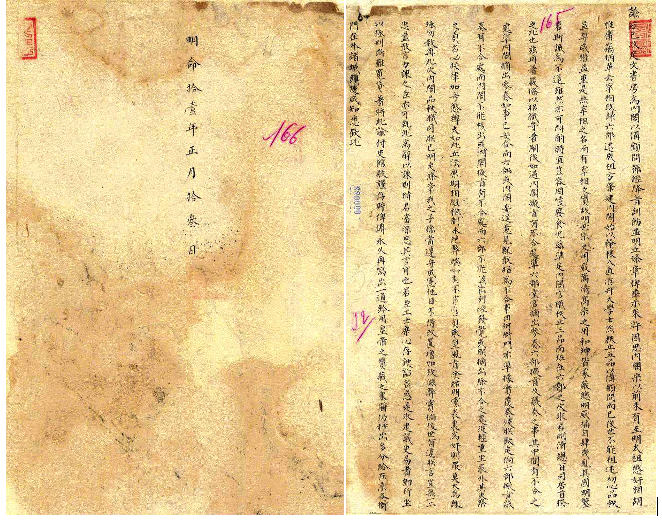
An imperial decree (諭, Dụ) of the Minh Mạng Emperor on the establishment of the Cabinet (內閣, Nội các) and the regulations of deliberation and supervision between the Cabinet and the Lục Bộ (六部).

Among the Minh Mạng Emperor's reforms was the increasingly close institutionalisation associated with the establishment of new government agencies. During the first 15 years of his rule, the Minh Mạng Emperor restructured the entire administration of the dynasty both at the central and local levels, basically codifying the political structures that the Nguyễn dynasty would use until its downfall in 1945. The Minh Mạng Emperor also increased the levels of supervision at every level of the bureaucracy, especially for the compiling, checking, copying, backing up, browsing, sending, and executing documents at every level of the Nguyễn administration.

The Minh Mạng Emperor also increased the direct influence of the monarch over the entire administrative system of the country and increased his power within the government.

This more complex system also meant that much more documents had to be created for communication between various agencies, the administrative divisions, and the imperial court in Huế. This increase in the number of government documents, especially imperial documents, shows an increase in the size and scope of the administrative system of the Minh Mạng period, associated with the expansion of the network of drafting and circulating documents. With most of the system centering on the Emperor, the Nội các, and the Cơ mật viện.

=== Expansion of French influence ===
Following the French conquest of Vietnam Đại Nam became two French protectorates in the form of Annam and Tonkin. Although the emperors of the Nguyễn dynasty were still nominally in control of the protectorates of Annam and Tonkin, the resident-superior of Annam gradually gained more influence over the imperial court in Huế. All constituent countries of French Indochina had their own legal systems. In Annam and Tonkin the laws of the Nguyễn dynasty, such as Sắc (敕, "Imperial Order"), Chí (誌, "Ordinance"), and Dụ (諭, "Decree"), remained in effect but were subordinate to the laws of the French administration.

Since the fall of Huế during the Cần Vương rebellion against the French on 7 May 1885 the government of the French protectorate of Annam would gradually take over the management of the budget and finances of the government of the Southern dynasty. In 1894, the court of the Thành Thái Emperor assigned Resident-Superior Léon Jules Pol Boulloche to take care of the management of the state's revenues, expenditures, taxes, etc. In 1897 the resident-superior was granted the power to appoint the Nguyễn dynasty emperors and presided over the meetings of the Viện cơ mật. These moves incorporated French officials directly into the administrative structure of the imperial Huế Court and further legitimised French rule in the legislative branch of the Nguyễn government. From this period onwards any imperial edicts issued by the emperors of Đại Nam had to be confirmed by the resident-superior of Annam giving him both legislative and executive power over the Nguyễn government.

In the year 1898 the federal government of French Indochina took over the financial and property management duties of the Nguyễn dynasty's imperial court meaning that the Nguyễn dynasty emperor (at the time Thành Thái) became a salaried employee of the Indochinese colonial structure, reducing their power to being only a civil servant of the protectorate government. The resident-superior of Annam also took over the management of provincial mandarins and was a member of the Supreme Council (Conseil supérieur) of the Government-General of French Indochina. In 1900, the governor-general of French Indochina issued a decree that established the Council of the Protectorate (Hội đồng Bảo hộ) alongside the resident-superior to "discuss and determine the revenue and expenditures of the budget of the French protectorate of Annam, but that this council would act according to the calculations and orders of the resident-superior. At the meetings of the Council of French Indochina (Hội đồng Đông Dương) the governor-general would decide through executive orders.

=== Creation of the Học Bộ ===
According to researcher Nguyễn Đắc Xuân, in 1907, the imperial court of the Nguyễn dynasty sent Cao Xuân Dục and Huỳnh Côn, the Thượng thư of the Hộ Bộ, to French Cochinchina to "hold a conference on education" (bàn nghị học chính) with the French authorities on the future of the Annamese education system. This meeting was also recorded in the work Hoàng Việt Giáp Tý niên biểu written by Nguyễn Bá Trác. The creation of a ministry of education was orchestrated by the French to reform the Nguyễn dynasty's educational system to match French ambitions in the region more.

On the ninth day of the ninth month of the first year of the reign of the Duy Tân Emperor the Học Bộ was established by imperial decree (諭, Dụ) to take over the functions relating to education from the Ministry of Rites.

While the Học Bộ was nominally a part of the Nguyễn dynasty's administrative apparatus, actual control was in the hands of the French Council for the Improvement of Indigenous Education in Annam (French: Conseil de Perfectionnement de l’Enseignement indigène en Annam; Vietnamese: Hội đồng Hoàn thiện giáo dục Bản xứ Trung Kỳ; Hán-Nôm: 會同完善教育本處中圻), which dictated its policies. All work done by the ministry was according to the plans and the command of the French Director of Education of Annam (監督學政中圻, Giám đốc Học chính Trung Kỳ). The French administration in Annam continuously revised the curriculum to be taught in order to fit the French system.

=== Regency (1925–1932) ===
On 6 November 1925 a "Convention" (Quy ước) was established after Khải Định's death that stated that while the sovereign is abroad a council (Hội đồng phụ chính) had the power to run all affairs of the Southern court, with the signing of the convention only regulations related to custom, favours, amnesty, conferring titles, dignitaries, among others are given by the emperor. Everything else is up to the French protectorate government. This document also merges the budget of the Southern court with the budget of the French protectorate of Annam and that all the meetings of the Council of Ministers (Hội đồng thượng thư) must be chaired by the resident-superior of Annam.

Thus, in this document, the French colonialists completely took over all the power of the government of the Southern dynasty, even in Trung Kỳ.

=== 1933 reforms ===
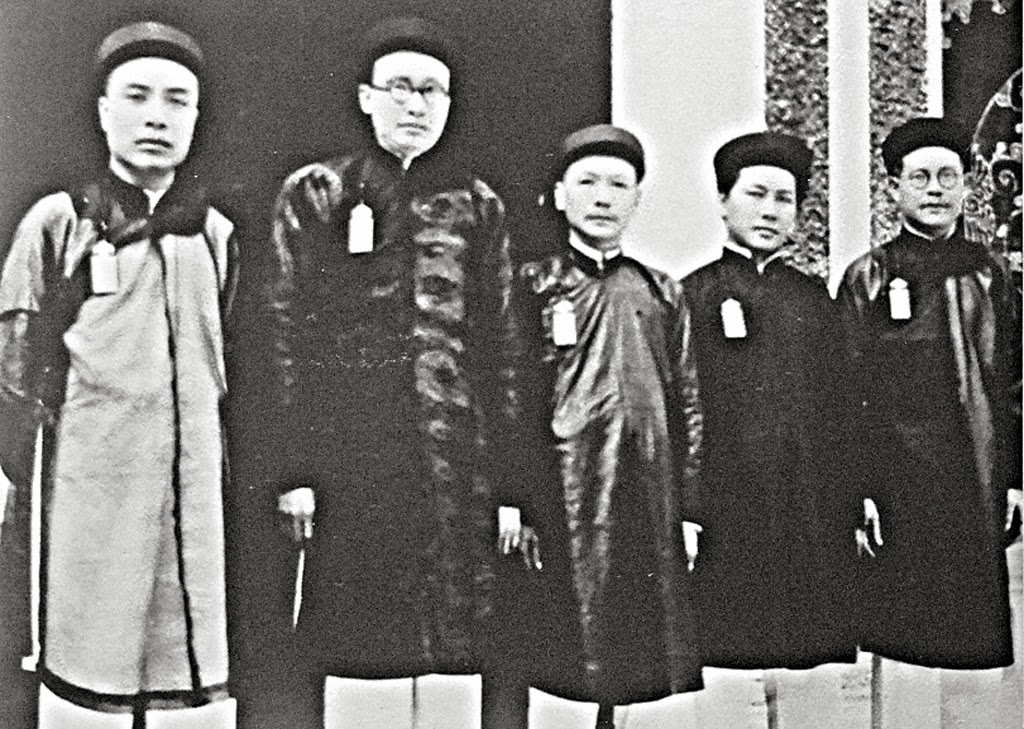
The five high-ranking mandarins (Thượng thư) of the Nguyễn dynasty during the reign of the Bảo Đại Emperor (from left to right): Hồ Đắc Khải, Phạm Quỳnh, Thái Văn Toản, Ngô Đình Diệm, and Bùi Bằng Đoàn.

In 1933 the Bảo Đại Emperor issued a series of reforms, among them he reformed the affairs of the court, such as rearranging internal affairs and administration. He also gave up a number of customs that the previous Nguyễn dynasty emperors had set forth such that subjects now did no longer have to bow down and could look up at the emperor whenever he went somewhere and instituted that mandarins would have to shake hands with the emperor instead of bowing down.

On 10 September 1932, the Bảo Đại Emperor issued Decree No. 1 abolishing the regency council and affirming the monarchy of Đại Nam and abolishing the regency.

Among these reforms was an imperial edict signed on 8 April 1933 that reshuffled the cabinet, as the Bảo Đại Emperor decided to govern himself and ordained five new well-known ministers from the academic and administrative circles. He retired Nguyễn Hữu Bài of the Ministry of Personnel (Bộ Lại), Tôn Thất Đàn of the Ministry of Justice (Bộ Hình), Phạm Liệu of the Ministry of War (Bộ Binh), Võ Liêm of the Ministry of Rites (Bộ Lễ), Vương Tứ Đại of the Ministry of Public Works (Bộ Công).

The firing of these high ranking mandarins of the government of the Southern dynasty caused a stir in public opinion at that time, these events caused the poet Nguyễn Trọng Cẩn to convey in detail the feelings of the Vietnamese people at the time through a poem using a unique set of homonyms as a play on words:

Năm cụ khi không rớt cái ình,
Đất bằng sấm dậy giữa thần kinh (Note: That is, the imperial city of Huế.).
Bài không đeo nữa xin dâng lại (Note: Nguyễn Hữu Bài - Thượng thư Bộ Lại.),
Đàn chẳng ai nghe khéo dở hình (Note: Tôn Thất Đàn - Thượng thư Bộ Hình.).
Liệu thế không xong binh chẳng được (Note: Phạm Liệu - Thượng thư Bộ Binh.),
Liêm đành chịu đói lễ đừng rinh (Note: Võ Liêm - Thượng thư Bộ Lễ.).
Công danh như thế là hưu hỉ,
Đại sự xin nhường lớp hậu sinh (Note: Vương Tứ Đại - Thượng thư Bộ Công.).

The old seven ministries were replaced with only five ministries, namely the Ministry of Personnel (Bộ Lại) headed by Ngô Đình Diệm, the Ministry of Ceremonies and Fine Arts (Bộ Lễ nghi - Mỹ thuật) headed by Thái Văn Toản, Ministry of National Education (Bộ Quốc gia Giáo dục) headed by Phạm Quỳnh, Ministry of Justice (Bộ Tư pháp) headed by Bùi Bằng Đoàn, and the Ministry of Public Works (Bộ Công chính) headed by Hồ Đắc Khải. Later the Bảo Đại Emperor also established the Ministry of Finance and Social Relief (Bộ Tài chính và Cứu tế Xã hội).

The Ministry of Personnel was the only ministry that the Bảo Đại Emperor didn't reform as it would remain practically unchanged until it was renamed to the Ministry of Internal Affairs in 1942.

On 24 October 1933 the Bảo Đại Emperor signed an imperial decree stating that the Consultative Assembly of Tonkin now represents the government of the Southern dynasty in the French protectorate of Tonkin. Later in December 1933 the Emperor traveled to Tonkin to visit the people and tell them about his reforms.

By 1939 the number of ministries in Bảo Đại's cabinet would increase to 7.

=== Trần Trọng Kim cabinet ===
Following the Japanese coup d'état in French Indochina, the Bảo Đại Emperor issued an imperial edict revoking the protectorate treaty of 1884 restoring Vietnamese independence from France, but in reality the Empire of Vietnam was a Japanese puppet state. Trần Trọng Kim, a renowned historian and scholar, was chosen to lead the government as its prime minister.

On 7 April 1945, the Bảo Đại Emperor signed Decree No. 5 approving the composition of Trần Trọng Kim's new cabinet and on 12 May he dissolved the House of Representatives of Annam.

The Trần Trọng Kim cabinet included 10 ministries, namely the Ministry of Foreign Affairs (Bộ Ngoại giao), Ministry of Internal Affairs (Bộ Nội vụ), Ministry of Justice (Bộ Tư pháp), Ministry of Education and Fine Arts (Bộ Giáo dục và Mỹ nghệ), Ministry of Economic Affairs (Bộ Kinh tế), Ministry of Public Finance (Bộ Tài chính), Ministry of Public Works (Bộ Công chính), Ministry of Youth Affairs (Bộ Thanh niên), Ministry of Health and Relief (Bộ Y tế và Cứu tế), Ministry of Material Assistance (Bộ Tiếp tế).

== Government agencies ==
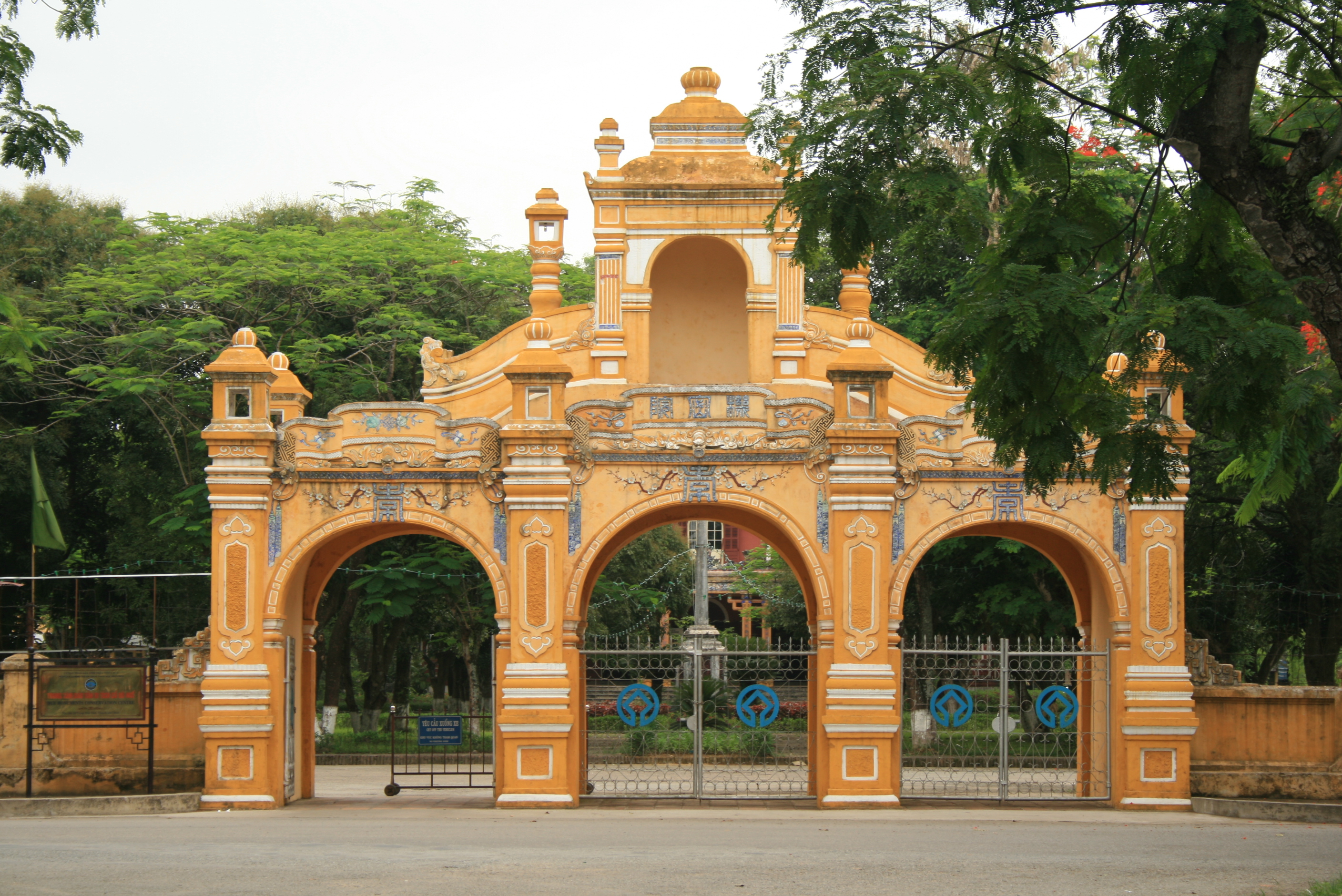
Viện cơ mật

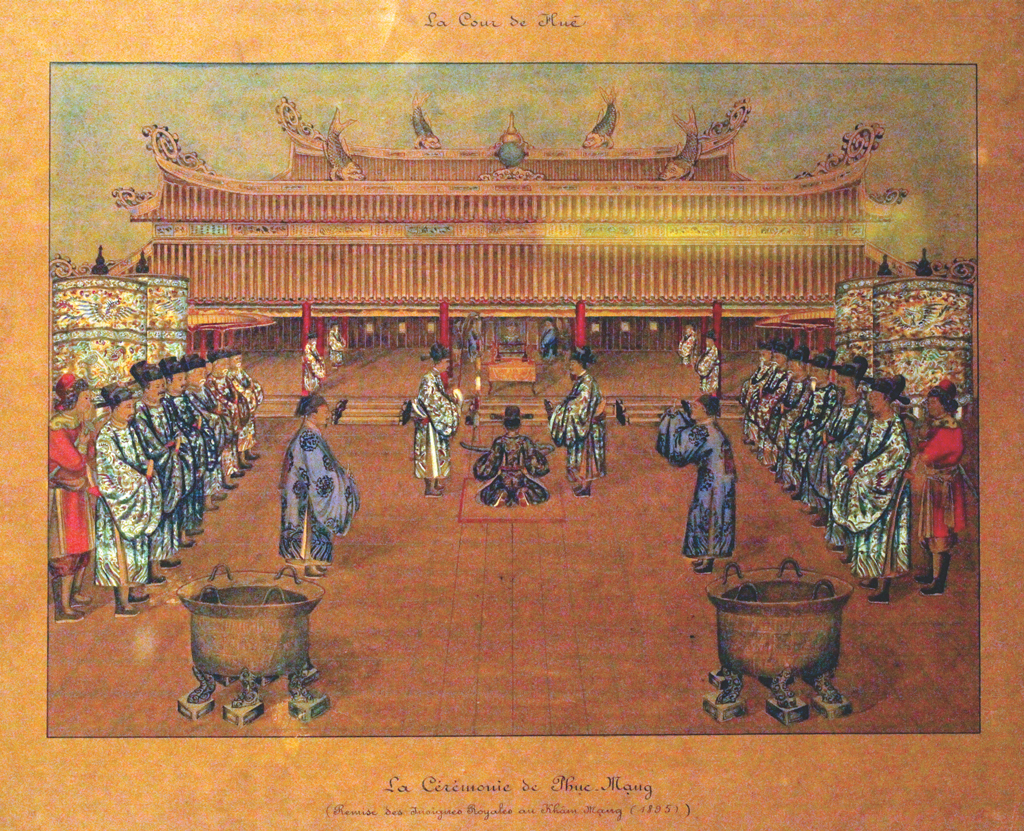
Royal audience

Vietnam under the Nguyễn (1802–1945) was an absolute monarchy. The Huế government was centrally administered by several advisory imperial agencies in a Sino–Vietnamese pattern. The Emperor was the head of state, also the head of the government, and the royal members stayed after. Under the emperor were layers of secretariats with officials (mandarins), organised with different functions, acted like a semi-parliamentary system.

- Viện cơ mật - (Privy Council) handled the state's internal affairs and also served as an interlocutor between the emperor and other royal agencies. It comprised four highest-ranking senior officials.
- Nội các - (Grand Secretariat/Cabinet) originally called Phòng Văn Thư. The Nội các has four senior officials and 28 (later 34) clerks thuộc viên that read, copy and record information, overall the Nội các processed documents and memorials from provinces and present them to the Emperor. The Nội các itself has four subordinate offices:
  - Thượng Bưu Sở - (Imperial seal office) created copies of all imperial edicts, proclamations, decrees.
  - Ty Luân Sở - (Imperial legislation office) recorded daily lectures and diaries of royal princes and copied judicial documents.
  - Bí Thư Sở - (Imperial books office) recorded and preserved imperial poetry, books, maps, and documents relating to foreign relations.
  - Bản Chương Sở - (Imperial record office) received memorials and documents, analyzed and processed them before storing them in the court's archive.
- Viện Hàn Lâm - (Literature Secretariat) with functions similar to Chinese Hanlin Academy.
- Quốc Tử Giám - Imperial Academy.
- Phủ nội vụ - Imperial Household Department.

=== Ministries ===
Ministries of the Nguyễn dynasty

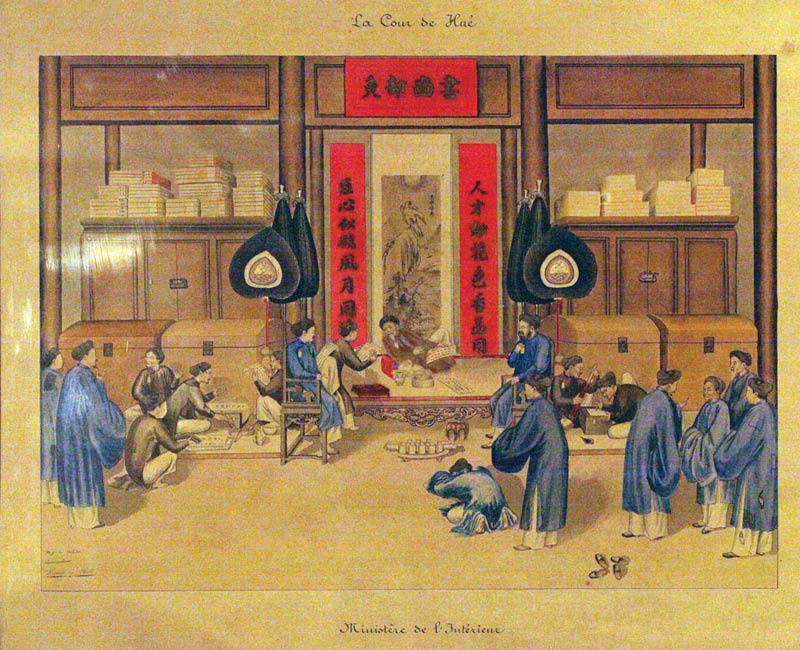
Administration

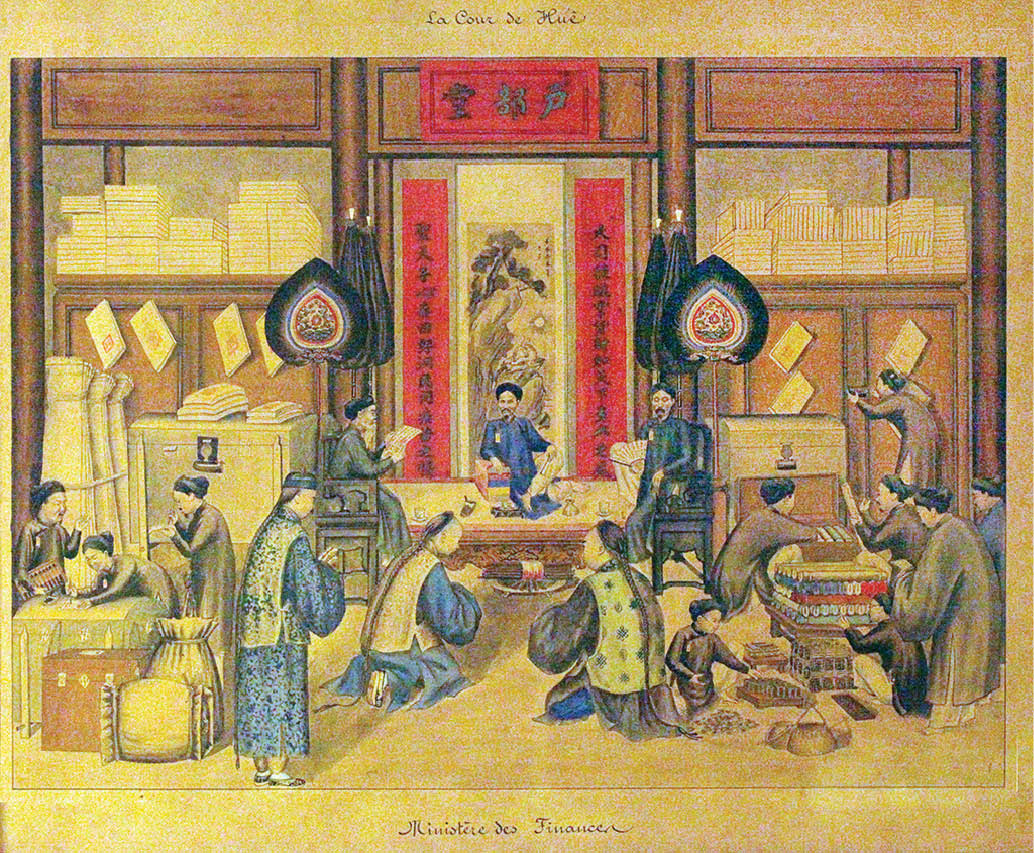
Finance

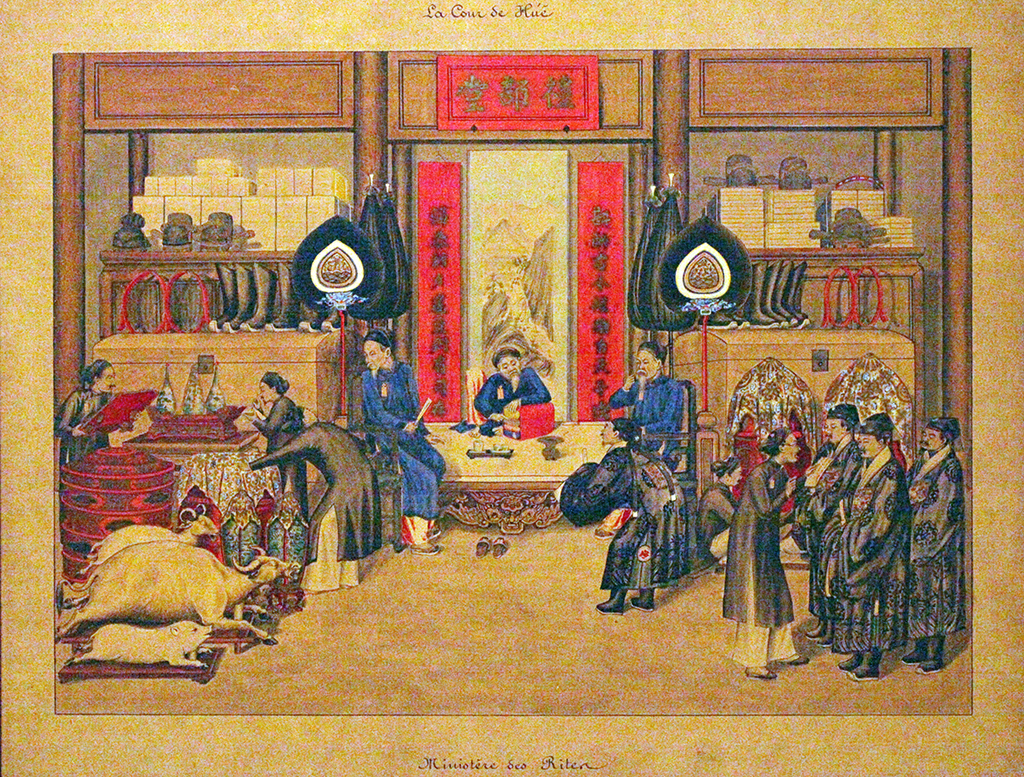
Rites

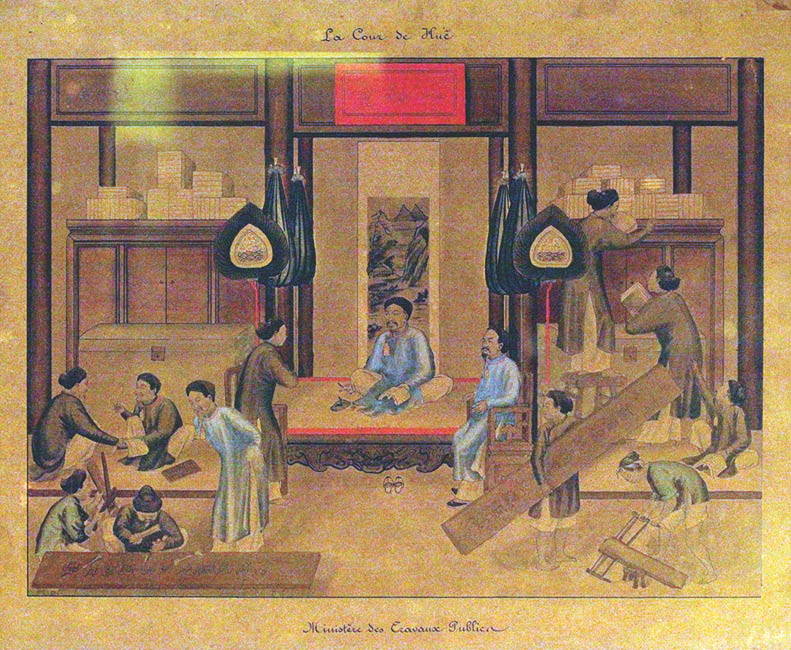
Public Works

The Lục Bộ (Council of Six Ministries) was a collective term for six royal agencies that held ministerial and judicial functions, administering the kingdom. Each ministry had a thượng thư (president), two tham tri (vice-president), two thị lang (minor-president). Under all above positions, the ministry divided itself into several thanh lại ty (panels), which their staffs were lang trung (directors), viên ngoại lang (vice-directors) and chủ sự (secretaries). All members of the whole six ministries always totally numbered 100 people.

- Bộ Lại - Ministry of Administration, supervised the specific appointments, transfers, promotions, and dismissals of individual civil officials in the bureaucracy.
- Bộ Lễ - Ministry of Rites, provided classical texts, helped the system to recruit officials through education and examinations, court rituals, festivals, and also was responsible for diplomatic relations with China and other states.
- Bộ Hộ - Ministry of Finance, had obligations to asset and collect taxes; print and spend money; watch the economy, particularly agriculture; adjust currency, salaries, price; and preserve imperial treasuries.
- Bộ Hình - Ministry of Justice, worked along with Đại lý tự (Grand Tribunal) and Viện đô sát (Censorate). It supervised the judicial system. At the end of each year, it reported to the emperor the numbers of inmates in jails and the numbers of unsolved cases on a list called hình danh sách.
- Bộ Công - Ministry of Public Works, managed workers and artisans to construct the imperial palaces, roads, bridges, buildings, and ships.
- Bộ Binh - Ministry of War, controlled the military bureaucracy, proposed the promotions, demotions, and assignments of officers, managed deployments of the army, and records military activities.

=== Censorate ===
The Viện đô sát (Censorate) was an important organ that observed the government and then reported to the Emperor. The Viện đô sát's senior officials were called Tả đô ngự sử (Censor-in-chief of the Left) and hữu đô ngự sử (Censor-in-chief of the Right). The Vietnamese censorate comprised six lục khoa ("office of scrutiny"), each headed by an Cấp sự trung (senior supervising secretary) official.

- Lại khoa, watching the Ministry of administration and the Viện Hàn Lâm.
- Hộ khoa, watching the Ministry of finance, the Phủ nội vụ, tào chính (transport administration).
- Lễ khoa, watching the Ministry of rites, Thái thường tự (Court of Imperial Sacrifices), Quang lộc tự (Court of Imperial Entertainments), and the Quốc Tử Giám.
- Binh khoa, watching the Ministry of military, Thái bộc tự (Court of the Imperial Stud) and Vũ khố (Armory arsenal).
- Hình khoa, watching the Ministry of justice and the Đại lý tự (Court of Judicial Review).
- Công khoa, watching the Ministry of public works.

== Bureau rank ==
The bureaucrat army of the royal court, local governments, and the military were divided into specific orders:

Rank	Civil position	Military position
First of firsts (Bậc trên nhất phẩm)	Royal Clan Court (Tông Nhân Phủ, Tôn nhân lệnh); Three Ducal Ministers (Tam công): * Grand Preceptor (Thái sư) * Grand Tutor (Thái phó) * Grand Protector (Thái bảo)	Same
First senior rank (Chánh nhất phẩm)	Left Right Imperial Clan Court (Tôn nhân phủ, Tả Hữu tôn chính"); Three Vice-Ducal Ministers (Tam Thiếu) * Vice Preceptor (Thiếu sư) * Vice Tutor (Thiếu phó) * Vice Protector (Thiếu bảo)	Same
First junior rank (Tòng nhất phẩm)	Council of State (Tham chính viện); House of Councillors (Tham Nghị viện); Grand Secretariat (Thị trung Đại học sĩ)	Banner Unit Lieutenant General, General-in-Chief, Provincial Commander-in-Chief
Second senior rank (Chánh nhị phẩm)	Lục Bộ (Lục bộ): * Ministry of Administration (Bộ Lại) * Ministry of Rites (Bộ Lễ) * Ministry of Justice (Bộ Hình) * Ministry of Finance (Bộ Hộ) * Ministry of Public Works (Bộ Công) * Ministry of Military (Bộ Binh); Supreme Censorate (Đô sát viện, Tả Hữu Đô ngự sử)	Banner Captain General, Commandants of Divisions, Brigade General
Second junior rank (Tòng nhị phẩm)	6 Ministerial Advisors (Lục bộ Tả Hữu Tham tri); Grand coordinator and provincial governor (Tuần phủ); Supreme Vice-Censorate (Đô sát viện, Tả Hữu Phó đô ngự sử)	Major General, Colonel
Third senior rank (Chánh tam phẩm)	Senior Head of 6 Ministries (Chánh thiêm sự); Administration Commissioner (Cai bạ); Surveillance Commissioner (Ký lục); State Auxiliary Academician of Secretariat (Thị trung Trực học sĩ); Court Auxiliary Academician (Trực học sĩ các điện); Court academician (Học sĩ các điện); Provincial governor (Hiệp trấn các trấn)	Brigadiers of Artillery & Musketry, Brigadier of Scouts, Banner Division Colonel
Third junior rank (Tòng tam phẩm)	Junior Head of Six Ministries (Thiếu thiêm sự); Senior Palace Administration Commissioner (Cai bạ Chính dinh); Chargé d'affaires (Tham tán); Court of Imperial Seals (Thượng bảo tự); General Staff (Tham quân)	Banner Brigade Commander
Fourth senior rank (Chánh tứ phẩm)	Provincial Education Commissioner of Quốc tử giám (Quốc tử giám Đốc học); Head of six ministries (Thiếu thiêm sự); Junior Court of Imperial Seals (Thượng bảo thiếu Khanh); Grand Secretariat (Nội các); Administration Commissioner of Trường Thọ palace (Cai bạ cung Trường Thọ); Provincial Advisor to Defense Command Lieutenant Governor (Tham hiệp các trấn)	Lieutenant Colonel of Artillery, Musketry & Scouts Captain, Police Major
Fourth junior rank (Tòng tứ phẩm)	Provincial Vice Education Commissioner of Quốc tử giám, Prefect (Tuyên phủ sứ),	Captain, Assistant Major in Princely Palaces
Fifth senior rank (Chánh ngũ phẩm)	Inner Deputy Supervisors of Instruction at Hàn Lâm Institutes, Sub-Prefects	Police Captain, Lieutenant or First Lieutenant
Fifth junior rank (Tòng ngũ phẩm)	Assistant Instructors and Librarians at Imperial and Hàn Lâm Institutes, Assistant Directors of Boards and Courts, Circuit Censors	Gate Guard Lieutenants, Second Captain
Sixth senior rank (Chánh lục phẩm)	Secretaries & Tutors at Imperial & Hàn Lâm Institutes, Secretaries and Registrars at Imperial Offices, Police Magistrate	Bodyguards, Lieutenants of Artillery, Musketry & Scouts, Second Lieutenants
Sixth junior rank (Tòng lục phẩm)	Assistant Secretaries in Imperial Offices and Law Secretaries, Provincial Deputy Sub-Prefects, Buddhist & Taoist priests	Deputy Police Lieutenant
Seventh senior rank (Chánh thất phẩm)	None	City Gate Clerk, Sub-Lieutenants
Seventh junior rank (Tòng thất phẩm)	Secretaries in Offices of Assistant Governors, Salt Controllers & Transport Stations	Assistant Major in Nobles' Palaces
Eighth senior rank (Chánh bát phẩm)	None	Ensigns
Eighth junior rank (Tòng bát phẩm)	Sub-director of Studies, Archivists in Office of Salt Controller	First Class Sergeant
Ninth senior rank (Chánh cửu phẩm)	None	Second Class Sergeant
Ninth junior rank (Tòng cửu phẩm)	Prefectural Tax Collector, Deputy Jail Warden, Deputy Police Commissioner, Tax Examiner	Third Class Sergeant, Corporal, First & Second Class Privates

== Politics ==
Along with the bureaucracy, nineteenth-century Vietnamese court politics also were dominated by several prominent figures. During Gia Long's reign, they were Nguyễn Văn Thành (1758–1817)-the Viceroy of Tonkin from 1802 to 06, Lê Văn Duyệt (1763–1832)-the Viceroy of Saigon from 1812 to 32, Phạm_Đăng_Hưng(1764–1825)-the minister of the Ministry of Rites, two Minh Hương Chinese Trịnh Hoài Đức (1765–1825) and Lê Quang Định (1759–1813) who held the minister position of the Ministry of Military, all formerly fought with Gia Long against the Taysons. During Thieu Tri and early Tu Duc' years (1840s–1860s), several regents arose in the court politics, such as Trương Đăng Quế (1793–1865), Lâm Duy Hiệp (1803–1863), and Nguyễn Tri Phương (1800–1873). For example, Trương Đăng Quế, originally was the minister of the Ministry of Military, earned the position of regent and Văn Minh đại học sĩ (second-highest rank in the Confucian hierarchy) in 1841 at the time when emperor Thieu Tri ascending the throne and became more powerful. He attained more power after had successfully installed conservative emperor Tu Duc to the crown in 1847, obtained the title đại học sĩ (highest rank in the Confucian hierarchy), quận công (highest noble title of all Vietnam), virtually became the dictator of Vietnam during the early years of Tu Duc.

== The Gia Long Code ==
Emperor Gia Long (r. 1802–19) published his legal code Hoàng Việt luật lệ, also known as the Gia Long Code in 1812, comprised 398 articles and was the last legal code of the Vietnamese monarchy. It is based on much of the Chinese legal code and reduced women's legal status in society. The Code was translated to French in 1865.

== Administrative divisions ==
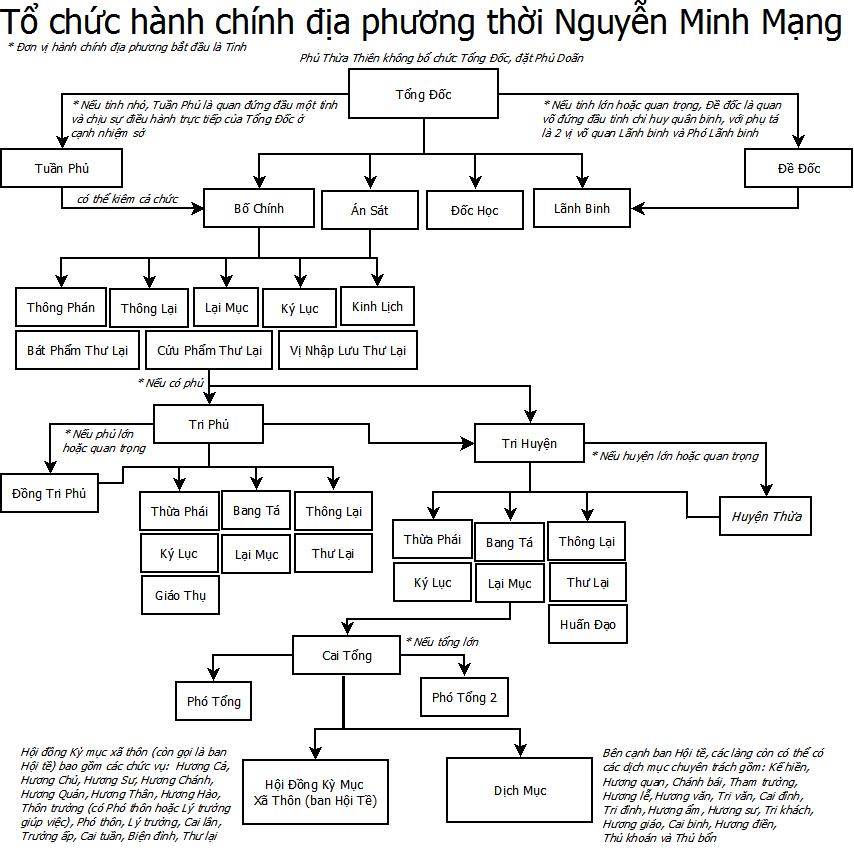
An organisational chart of the levels of mandarins in the provincial administration of the Nguyễn dynasty.

=== Under Gia Long ===
During the reign of Gia Long, the empire was divided into twenty-three quasi-militant protectorates trấn and four military departments doanh. Each protectorate, besides having their own separated regional governments, were under patrol of one greater, powerful unit called Overlord of Citadel, or the Viceroy. For examples, the northern protectorates had Bắc thành Tổng trấn (Viceroy of Northern Protectorates) in Hanoi, and southern protectorates had Gia Định thành Tổng trấn (Viceroy of Gia Định Protectorates) resides in Saigon. Two famously viceroys during Gia Long's reign were Nguyễn Văn Thành (Hanoi) and Lê Văn Duyệt (Saigon). By 1802, these were:

- 16 protectorates under joint-governance from the Viceroys.
1. Sơn Nam Thượng (Hanoi)
2. Sơn Nam Hạ (Nam Định)
3. Sơn Tây
4. Kinh Bắc (Bắc Ninh)
5. Hải Dương
6. Tuyên Quang
7. Hưng Hoá
8. Cao Bằng
9. Lạng Sơn
10. Thái Nguyên
11. Quảng Yên
12. Gia Định or Phiên An
13. Biên Hoà
14. Vĩnh Thanh (later became Vĩnh Long and An Giang
15. Định Tường (Bến Tre)
16. Hà Tiên
- 7 Central protectorates
1. Thanh Hoá
2. Nghệ An
3. Quảng Nghĩa (Quảng Ngãi)
4. Bình Định
5. Phú Yên
6. Bình Hoà (Khánh Hoà)
7. Bình Thuận
- 4 departments surrounding Huế, directly ruled by Gia Long.
1. Quảng Đức
2. Quảng Bình
3. Quảng Trị
4. Quảng Nam

=== Minh Mạng and later ===
In 1831, Minh Mạng reorganised his empire by converting all these protectorates into 31 provinces (tỉnh). Each province had a series of smaller jurisdictions: the prefecture (phủ), the subprefecture (châu, in areas whereas having a significant population of ethnic minorities). Under prefecture and subprefecture, there was the district (huyện), the canton (tổng). Under district and canton, the bundle of hamlets around one common religious temple or social factor point, the village làng or the commune (xã) was the lowest administrative unit, which one respected person nominally took care of village administrative, which called lý trưởng.

Two nearby provinces were combined into a pair. Every pair had a governor-general (Tổng đốc) and a governor (Tuần phủ). Frequently, there were twelve governor-generals and eleven governors, although, in some periods, the emperor would appoint a "commissioner in charge of patrolled borderlands" (kinh lược sứ) that supervising entire northern of the southern part of the empire. In 1803, Vietnam had 57 prefectures, 41 subprefectures, 201 districts, 4,136 cantons and 16,452 villages, and then by 1840s it had been increased to 72 prefectures, 39 subprefectures and 283 districts, which an average 30,000 people per district. Cambodia had been absorbed into the Vietnamese administrative system, bore the name Tây Thành Province from 1834 to 1845. With areas having minority groups like Tày, Nùng, Mèo (Hmong people), Mường, Mang and Jarai, the Huế court imposed the co-existing tributary and quasi-bureaucratic governance system, while allowing these people to have their own local rulers and autonomy.

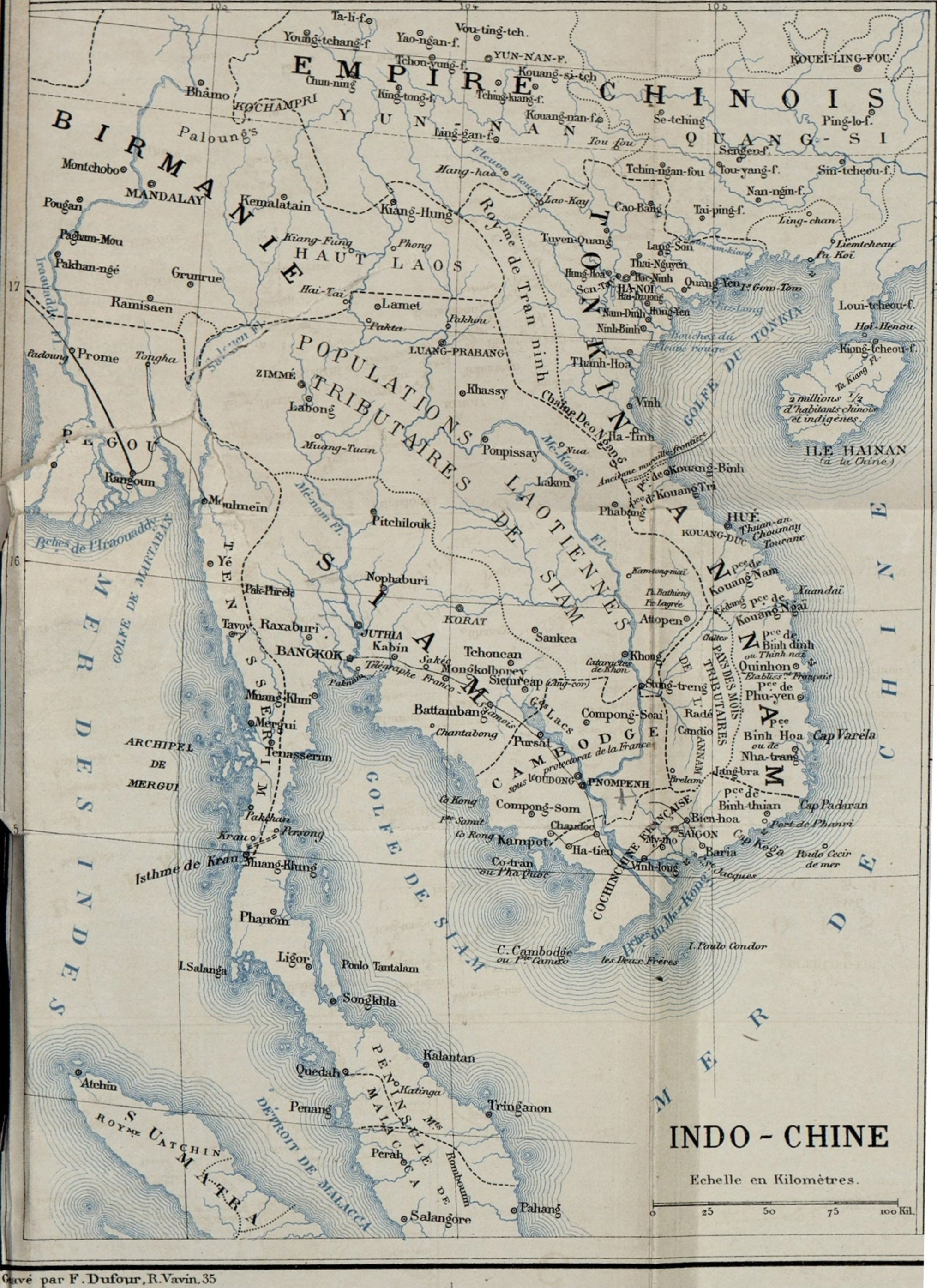
Map of 1883 Indochina Peninsula, shows three Vietnamese regions and client territories (Pays des Mois and Royme de Tran-ninh) of the Vietnamese Crown.

In 1832, there were:

- Three regions and 31 provinces (encompassed modern-day Vietnam):
1. Bắc Kỳ (Tonkin)
  1. Hanoi
  2. Lạng Sơn
  3. Cao Bằng
  4. Bắc Ninh
  5. Thái Nguyên
  6. Nam Định
  7. Hưng Yên
  8. Sơn Tây
  9. Hưng Hoá
  10. Tuyên Quang
  11. Hải Dương
  12. Quảng Yên
  13. Ninh Bình
2. Trung Kỳ (Annam)
  1. Thanh Hoá
  2. Nghệ An
  3. Hà Tĩnh
  4. Quảng Bình
  5. Quảng Trị
  6. Thừa Thiên
  7. Quảng Nam
  8. Quảng Ngãi
  9. Bình Định
  10. Phú Yên
  11. Khánh Hoà
  12. Bình Thuận
3. Nam Kỳ (Cochinchina)
  1. Biên Hoà
  2. Gia Định
  3. Vĩnh Long
  4. Định Tường
  5. An Giang
  6. Hà Tiên
- Client/dependent territories:
1. Luang Phrabang
2. Vientine
3. Cambodia
4. Jarai chiefdoms
- Chief cities:
1. Huế, capital city, population (1880): 30,000
2. Hanoi, major city, population (1880): 120,000
3. Saigon, major city, population (1880): 100,000

== See also ==
- Government of the Qing dynasty
