= Nội các (Nguyễn dynasty) =

Administrative office of the Nguyễn dynasty

Cabinet of the Nguyễn dynasty
- Nội các (內閣)
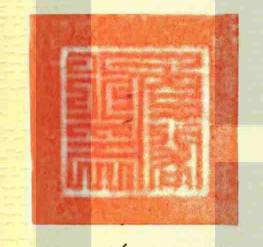
- Nội các chi ấn (內閣之印), the Great Seal of the cabinet of the Nguyễn dynasty used between 1931 and 1934.

Agency overview
- Preceding agency: Văn thư phòng
- Dissolved: 1934
- Superseding agency: Ngự tiền văn phòng
- Type: Cabinet
- Jurisdiction: Nguyễn dynasty
- Headquarters: Huế

Footnotes

The Grand Secretariat, or the Cabinet (Vietnamese: Nội các, 內閣) of the Nguyễn dynasty, was the highest branch of its government until the 1930s. Its functions were to serve at the pleasure of the emperor. The Grand Secretariat consisted of four senior officials and 28 employees who served as secretaries, readers, and recorders and worked for almost the imperial government's documents and affairs.

The senior officials were Thượng bảo tào, Biểu bạ tào, Bí thư tào and Ký chú tào.

During the reign of the emperor Gia Long (1802–1819), the cabinet comprised 3 secretaries: Thị Thư Viện, Thị Hàn viện and Nội Hàn Viện. In 1820, emperor Minh Mạng dissolved the three secretaries, incorporated them into the new organ called Văn thư phòng–the predecessor of the Nội các. However, the Văn thư phòng did not function as a legislature branch of the imperial court until 1829, when Minh Mạng reorganized it to become the Nội các.

== Seals ==
The first seal of the Nội các was a quan phòng and bore the seal script inscription Sung biện Nội các sự vụ Quan phòng (充辨内閣事務關防), having a size of 1 tấc (𡬷) in length and 7 phân (分) 2 ly (釐) in width it was similar in size of the Văn thư phòng quan phòng (文書房關防) seal of the preceding agency. The characters were divided 3-2-3 with the middle two characters being a bit larger than the characters on either side. The usage of this seal lasted from the inception of the Nội các until the very end of the reign of the Hàm Nghi Emperor. In September 1885 the Đồng Khánh Emperor was crowned and in December 1885 the Ministry of Rites ordered the creation of a new seal as the emperor's personal name was Nguyễn Phúc Biện (阮福昪) and because of a naming taboo the seal's inscription had to change from Sung biện Nội các sự vụ Quan phòng to Sung lý nội các sự vụ Quan phòng (充理内閣事務關防), the size of the new seal was 3,2 cm x 4,5 cm. During the Đồng Khánh period a kiềm ấn (small seal) was created with the inscription Nội các (內閣). The seal knob of the Sung lý nội các sự vụ Quan phòng was shaped like a sitting Chinese guardian lion.

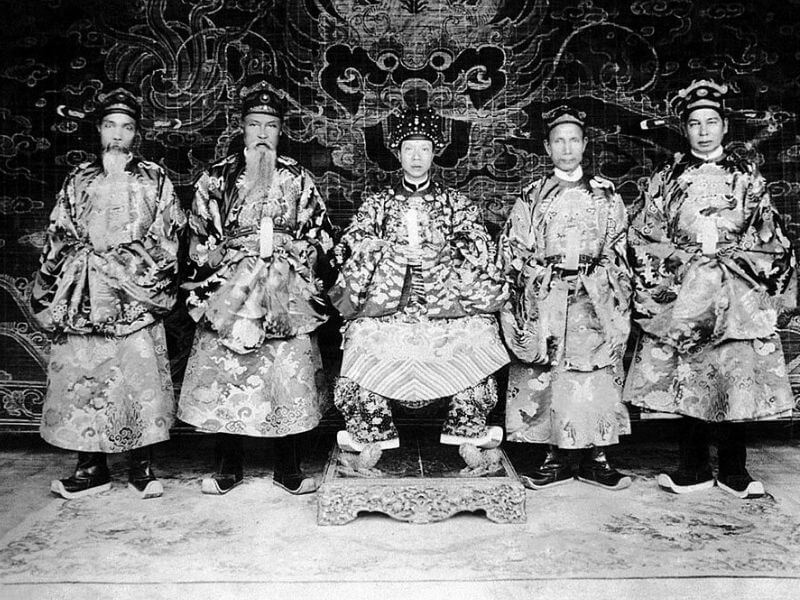
Emperor Khải Định and member of Nội các.From left to right: Hồ Đắc Trung, Tôn Thất Hân, emperor Khải Định (middle), Nguyễn Hữu Bài and Đoàn Đình Duyệt.

The Sung lý nội các sự vụ Quan phòng was used until the year Thành Thái 4 (1892), afterwards and during the entire Duy Tân and Khải Định reign periods a seal with the inscription Sung biện Nội các sự vụ Quan phòng was used, this inscription was identical to the seal used since the Minh Mạng period, but the characters were written using a different style of calligraphy.

In the year Bảo Đại 6 (1931) a new great seal was introduced, one with the inscription Nội các chi ấn (內閣之印), this size was 4 cm x 4 cm and continued to be used until the Nội các was superseded by the Ngự tiền văn phòng in the year Bảo Đại 9 (1934).

== Sources ==
- Goscha, Christopher (2016). Vietnam: A New History. Basic Books. ISBN 978-0-46509-436-3.
- ThS. Hà Văn Huề, ThS. Nguyễn Thị Thu Hường, ThS. Đoàn Thị Thu Thuỷ, PGS.TS Nguyễn Công Việt - Ấn chương trên Châu bản triều Nguyễn. - Năm xuất bản : 2013 Nhà xuất bản : (NXB Hà Nội Cuốn sách). (in Vietnamese).
- Woodside, Alexander (1988). Vietnam and the Chinese model: a comparative study of Vietnamese and Chinese government in the first half of the nineteenth century. Cambridge, Massachusetts: Harvard University Press. ISBN 0-674-93721-X.
