= Nguyễn Hữu Bài =

Vietnamese politician (1863–1935)

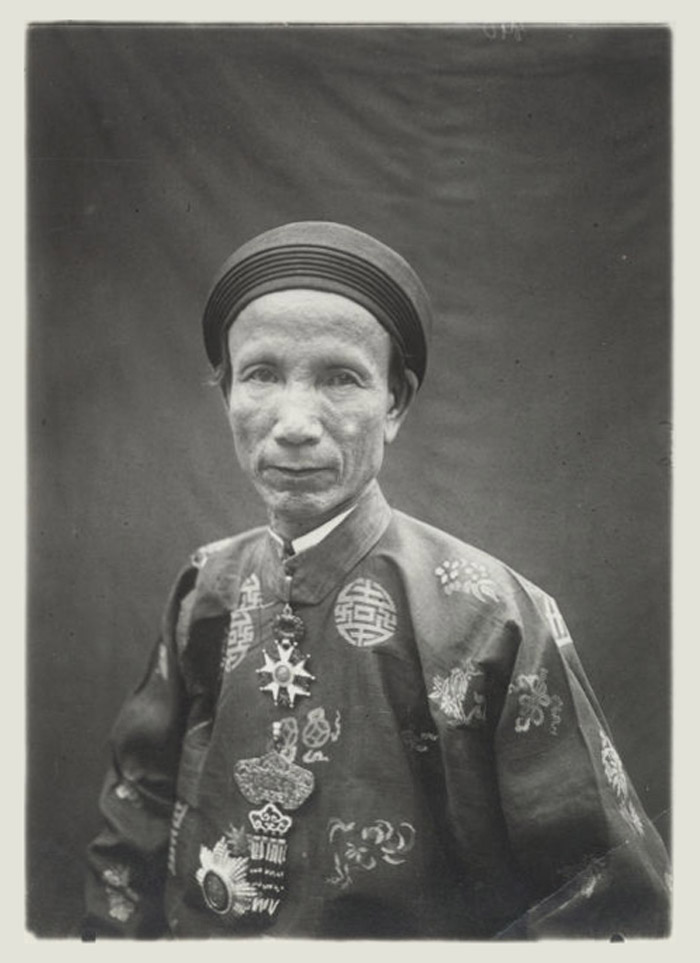
Nguyễn Hữu Bài

Nguyễn Hữu Bài (chữ Hán: 阮有排; 28 September 1863 – 10 July 1935) was a Minister of Personnel (Lại bộ Thượng Thư / 吏部尚書, similar to a minister of the interior) of the Nguyễn dynasty, serving under the Bảo Đại Emperor.

Bài was raised in Confucian ideals but was a Roman Catholic. He had taught Ngô Đình Diệm when he was a member of the royal court in the imperial capital of Huế, Vietnam. When the 13-year-old Bảo Đại Emperor returned to his studies in France after ascending the throne in 1926, Nguyễn Hữu Bài resumed leadership of the council of ministers of Annam, the protectorate occupying the central two thirds of French Indochina.

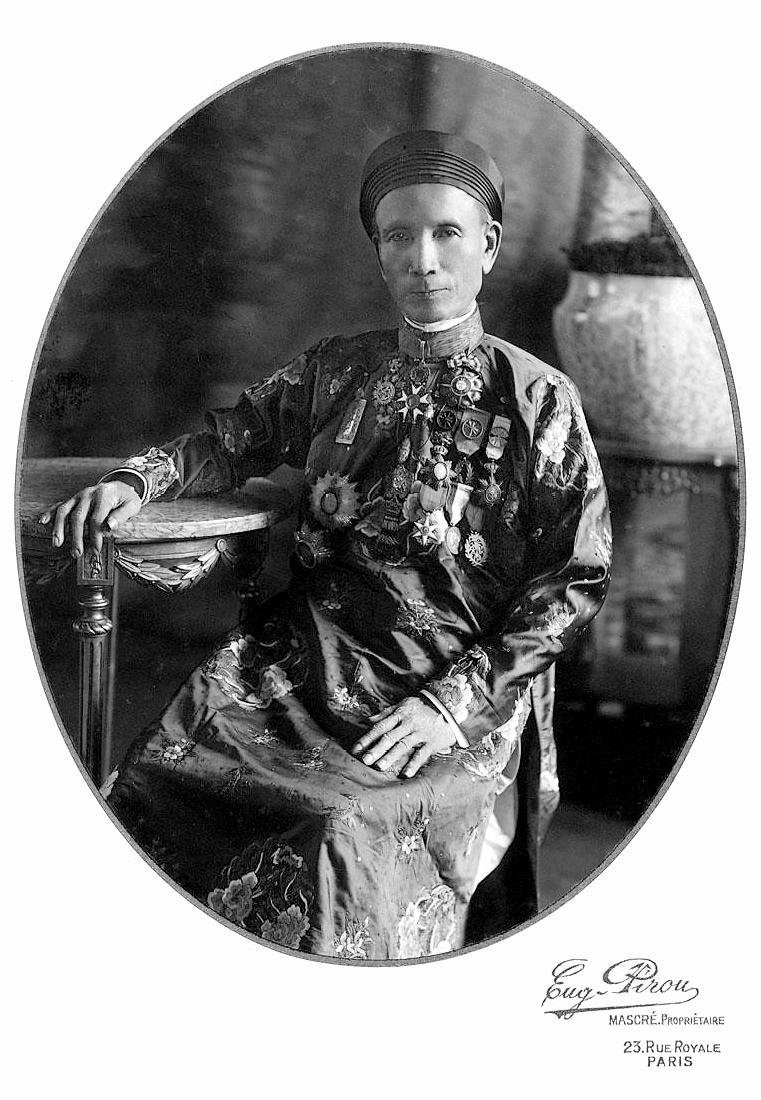

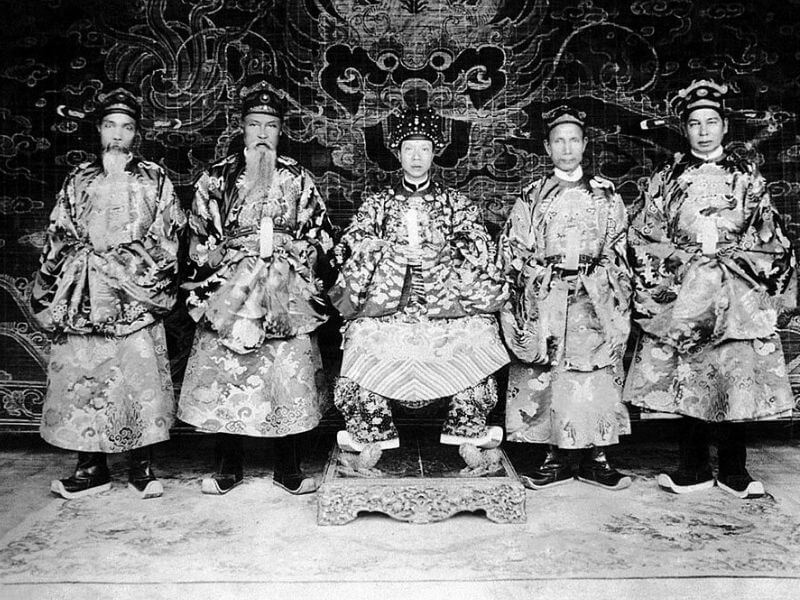
Nguyễn Hữu Bài in royal costume (second) from right

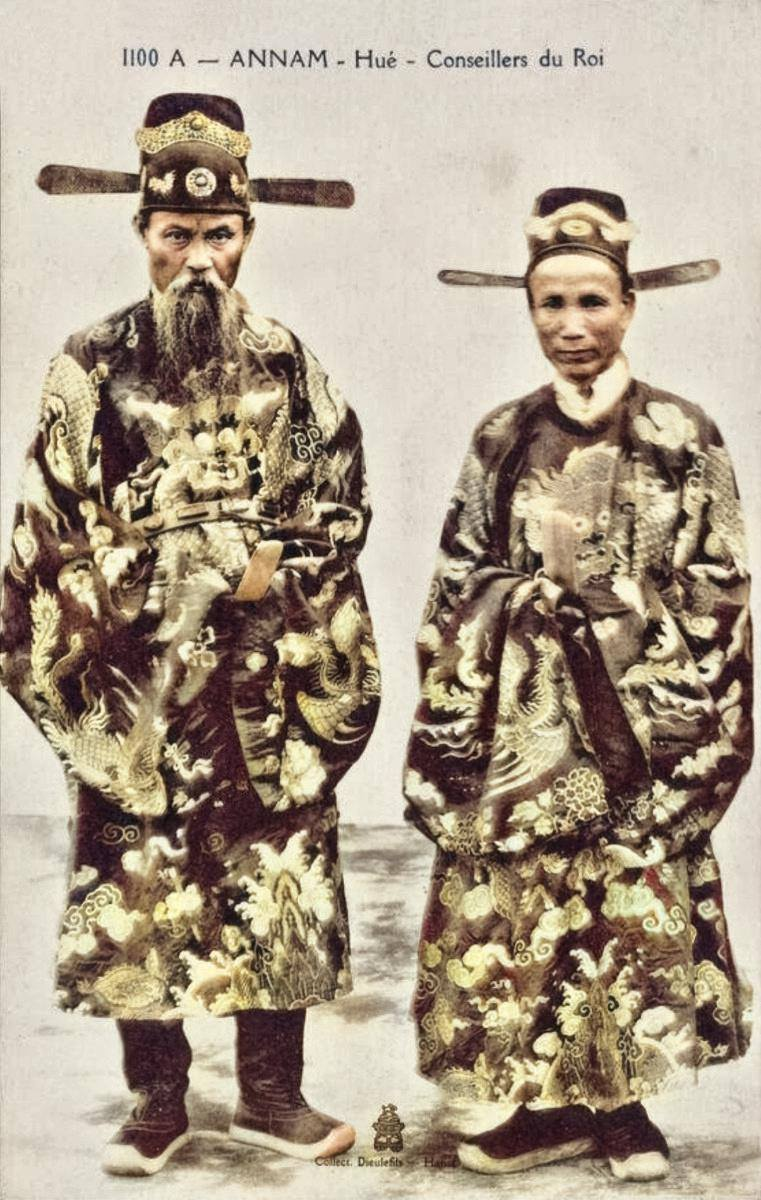
Tôn Thất Hân (left) and Nguyễn Hữu Bài in court dress, 1910s.

Lý Thường Kiệt Street in Hanoi (modern Nguyễn Thái Học Street) became known as phố Sinh Từ ("Living Temple Street"), due to a temple built to honour Bài while he was still alive, until 1908 when it was renamed Rue Duvillier by the French.

== Bibliography ==
- Chapuis, Oscar (2000). The Last Emperors of Vietnam. Westport, Connecticut: Greenwood Press. ISBN 0-313-31170-6. OCLC 42296168.
- Keith, Charles (2012). Catholic Vietnam: A Church from Empire to Nation. University of California Press. ISBN 978-0-520-95382-6.
