= Geismar (disambiguation) =

Geismar is a Thuringian municipality in the district Eichsfeld, in Thuringia, Germany

Geismar may also refer to:

== Places ==
- Ershausen/Geismar, a Verwaltungsgemeinschaft ("collective municipality") in the district Eichsfeld, in Thuringia, Germany
  - Geismar, a municipality in the above
- Geismar, Louisiana, an unincorporated area in Ascension Parish
- Geismar, an incorporated village of Göttingen, Germany

== People ==
- Gédéon Geismar (1863-1931), a French Brigadier-General
- Bertel Geismar Haarder (born 1944), a Danish politician
- Friedrich Caspar von Geismar, also known as Fyodor Geismar (1783–1848), an Austrian-German military officer
- Jårg Geismar (born 1958), a German artist
- Léon Geismar (born 1895), a French politician
- Luc Geismar (born 1966), French politician
- Maxwell Geismar (1909–1979), an American author
- Tom Geismar (born 1931), an American graphic designer
- Alain Geismar (born 1939), French politician

== Other ==
- Chermayeff & Geismar & Haviv, a New York-based branding and graphic design firm
