= Maurice Antoine François Monguillot =

French colonial administrator

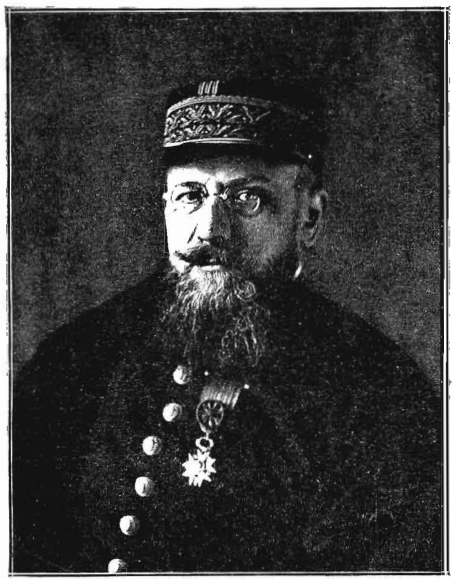

Governor-General of French Indochina
- In office 22 May 1919 – 19 February 1920
- President: Raymond Poincaré; Paul Deschanel
- Preceded by: Albert Sarraut
- Succeeded by: Maurice Long
- In office 23 Apr 1925 – 18 Nov 1925
- President: Gaston Doumergue
- Preceded by: Martial Henri Merlin
- Succeeded by: Alexandre Varenne
- In office 1 November 1927 – 7 August 1928
- President: Gaston Doumergue
- Preceded by: Pierre Marie Antoine Pasquier
- Succeeded by: Eugène Jean Louis René Robin

Personal details
- Born: 9 August 1874 Paris, France
- Died: 23 June 1945 (aged 70)
- Occupation: Colonial administrator

Maurice Antoine François Monguillot (9 August 1874 – 23 June 1945) was a French colonial administrator in French Indochina and soldier. He served as the acting governor-general of French Indochina three times; from May 1919 to February 1920, April 1925 to November 1925 and November 1927 to August 1928.

== Biography ==
Monguillot was named a Chevalier of the Légion d’Honneur on 18 January 1911, an Officier (Officer) of the Légion d’Honneur on 23 March 1916, Commandeur (Commander) of the Légion d’Honneur on 18 January 1921. His published notice for Commandeur of the Légion d’Honneur in 1925 notes that he had served as a Resident Superior (First Class) in Indo-China, Resident Superior in Tonkin and was later administrator of the Distilleries of Indochine, president of the Colonial Trust, then president of the nationalized tin mines in Upper Tonkin.

He won admission to the École Polytechnique of the Ministère de la Guerre in 1894 for four years, then served as an artillery soldier in the Troupes de marine from 1896 and into World War I until 1916. He served in Tonkin in 1902 during wartime, in peacetime Tunisia in 1906, to the French Antilles in 1908, in Cochinchina in 1909, wartime Tonkin in 1912, wartime Madagascar 1911–1912, French Equatorial Africa 1913–1914 and in the First World War in France from 2 August 1914 to 31 March 1916.

His school admission records to the École Polytechnique note that he was 1.67m tall with dark blonde hair and grey-blue eyes.

During his time as administrator in Asia, he published a decree on 30 October 1925, protecting the Angkor site. During Andre Malraux's time in Indochina, Monguillot watched him closely due to his association with Bolsheviks; when Malraux was in Hanoi, Monguillot refused to see him.

Monguillot asked to exercise (and was granted) his pension rights due to his long tenure with the government (with a special dispensation because of his age) starting 1 March 1929. He was aged 55 at the time.

Monguillot had a bird named after him, the Vietnamese greenfinch, so named by the American ornithologist Jean Théodore Delacour in 1926 under the binomial name Hypacanthis monguilloti
