= List of colonial administrators of French West Africa =

French West Africa

This is a list of European colonial administrators (French: Gouverneur général de l'Afrique occidentale française) responsible for the territory of French West Africa, an area equivalent to modern-day Mauritania, Mali, Niger, Senegal, Guinea, Ivory Coast, Burkina Faso, Benin and Togo.

== List ==
(Dates in italics indicate de facto continuation of office)

Tenure	Portrait	Incumbent	Notes
16 June 1895 to 1 November 1900		Jean-Baptiste Chaudié, Governor-General	
15 July 1897 to 2 October 1897		Noël Ballay, acting Governor-General	Acting for Chaudié
28 July 1898 to 13 November 1898		Noël Ballay, acting Governor-General	Acting for Chaudié
1 November 1900 to 26 January 1902		Noël Ballay, Governor-General	
19 April 1901 to 26 October 1901		Victor Lanrezac, acting Governor-General	Acting for Ballay
26 January 1902 to 15 March 1902		Pierre Paul Marie Capest, acting Governor-General	
15 March 1902 to 15 December 1907		Ernest Roume, Governor-General	
29 June 1902 to 25 October 1902		Victor Liotard, acting Governor-General	Acting for Roume
10 June 1903 to 29 October 1903		Martial Henri Merlin, acting Governor-General	Acting for Roume
8 July 1904 to 5 October 1904		Martial Henri Merlin, acting Governor-General	Acting for Roume
21 July 1905 to 5 November 1905		Martial Henri Merlin, acting Governor-General	Acting for Roume
18 March 1905 to 22 April 1905		Camille Guy, acting Governor-General	Acting for Roume
15 December 1907 to 9 March 1908		Martial Henri Merlin, acting Governor-General	1st time
9 March 1908 to 26 June 1915		William Merlaud-Ponty, Governor-General	
January 1912 to August 1912		François Joseph Clozel, acting Governor-General	Acting for Ponty
14 June 1915 to 3 June 1917		François Joseph Clozel, Governor-General	Acting for Ponty to 26 June 1915
3 June 1917 to 22 January 1918		Joost van Vollenhoven, Governor-General	
22 January 1918 to 30 July 1919		Gabriel Louis Angoulvant, acting Governor-General	
30 July 1919 to 16 September 1919		Charles Désiré Auguste Brunet, acting Governor-General	
16 September 1919 to 18 March 1923		Martial Henri Merlin, Governor-General	2nd time
18 March 1923 to 15 October 1930		Jules Carde, Governor-General	
31 May 1924 to 19 October 1924		Auguste Dirat, acting Governor-General	Acting for Cardé
17 April 1926 to 19 November 1926		Auguste Dirat, acting Governor-General	Acting for Cardé
23 March 1929 to 30 October 1929		Auguste Dirat, acting Governor-General	Acting for Cardé
15 October 1930 to 27 September 1936		Joseph Jules Brévié, Governor-General	
6 April 1933 to 2 December 1933		Albéric Auguste Fournier, acting Governor-General	Acting for Brévié
7 May 1935 to 5 December 1935		Pierre Boisson, acting Governor-General	Acting for Brévié
27 September 1936 to 14 July 1938		Jules Marcel de Coppet, Governor-General	
14 July 1938 to 28 October 1938		Léon Geismar, acting Governor-General	
28 October 1938 to 10 August 1939		Pierre Boisson, acting Governor-General	1st time
10 August 1939 to 25 June 1940		Léon Henri Charles Cayla, Governor-General	
25 June 1940 to 13 July 1943		Pierre Boisson, Governor-General	2nd time; also named Vichy French High Commissioner for all "French Africa", responsible for the territories that did not rally to the Free French
13 July 1943 to 2 April 1946		Pierre Charles Cournarie, Governor-General	
May 1946 to 27 January 1948		René Victor Marie Barthes, Governor-General	
27 January 1948 to 24 May 1951		Paul Béchard, Governor-General	
24 May 1951 to 21 September 1952		Paul Louis Gabriel Chauvet, acting Governor-General	
21 September 1952 to 5 July 1956		Bernard Cornut-Gentille, Governor-General	
5 July 1956 to 4 April 1957		Gaston Cusin, Governor-General	
4 April 1957 to July 1958		Gaston Cusin, High Commissioner	
July 1958 to 22 December 1958		Pierre Messmer, High Commissioner	

== See also ==
- French West Africa
- Ivory Coast
- Benin
  - French Dahomey
- Mali
  - French Sudan
- Guinea
- Mauritania
- Niger
- Senegal
- Burkina Faso
  - French Upper Volta
- Togo
  - French Togoland
- Lists of office-holders
- List of French possessions and colonies
