= Maurice Long =

Maurice Long may refer to:

- Maurice Long (politician) (1866–1923), French politician
- Maurice W. Long (1925–2023), American engineer
- Maurice Long, a character from the Canadian TV series Riverdale
- Maurice Long, a WWII French patrol ship; see list of shipwrecks in March 1945

== See also ==
- Maurice Long Museum, the first and largest economics museum in French Indochina, wsee Grand Palais (Hanoi)
- Maurice Longbottom, Australian rugby league and rugby union player
- Staats Long Morris (1728–1800), British army general
- .297/230 Morris Long, variant of the .297/230 Morris
