= Phú Riềng Đỏ =

Vietnam plantation worker strike (1930)

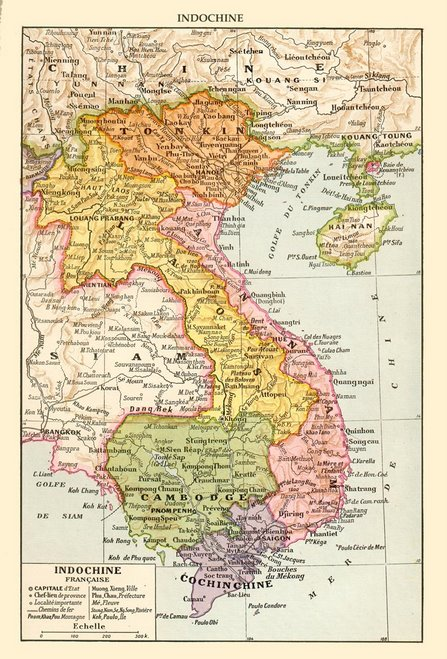
French Indochina in the 1930s.

Phú Riềng Đỏ or the Red Phú Riềng was a communist-instigated strike that took place in Michelin's Thuân-Loï rubber plantation near Phú Riềng in the Biên Hòa Province of Cochinchina on 4 February 1930. Most of the plantation labourers were peasants from Tonkin and Annam driven by poverty to seek livelihood in southern Vietnam. Working and living conditions on the plantations, however, were harsh and this situation was capitalised by the communists to launch the strike. Although the strike lasted only about a week, the unfolding of events at Phú Riềng Đỏ was significant as it served as a harbinger for important tactical and strategic considerations for other communist-led uprisings that followed later in the year. Hence, while the communists may not seem to have achieved much from Phú Riềng Đỏ, it actually offered them some valuable first lessons in their anti-colonial struggle.

== Background ==
Rubber production began in Cochinchina after 1907 when the French wanted a share of the profits that rubber brought to British Malaya. The colonial government encouraged investment from metropolitan France by granting large tracts of land to cultivate rubber on an industrial scale. Soon, both labour and infrastructure were harnessed in earnest as the virgin rainforests in eastern Cochinchina, the highly fertile 'red lands', were cleared for rubber plantations.

In fact by 1921, about 29,000 hectares of Cochinchinese land had turned into rubber plantations, and Biên Hòa, where Phu Rieng Do took place, was one of the most heavily cultivated provinces. French colonial earnings from rubber export were given a further boost with the implementation of the Stevenson Plan in 1922, which mandated the reduction of rubber production from the British colonies of Malaya and Ceylon "precisely at the time when the astronomical growth of automobile production created upward pressure on demand." Consequently, in the whole of Indochina, 90,225 hectares of land had already been cleared for rubber plantations by 1929.

Rubber cultivation was practised by both French and native Vietnamese planters. However, each had a very different experience of “heveaculture”, with the French plantations being much larger and having more access to resources from the colonial government and to cultivation techniques. Even so, the working conditions on these large French plantations were not conducive. On the other hand, smaller Vietnamese plantations invested little to improve their production processes because to them, scientific knowledge and advanced technology was the conduit through which new ideas could be harnessed to modernise Vietnam. In other words, while the French were profit-driven, the Vietnamese put nationalism before production, and the net effect was overall hardship for rubber plantation workers.

Rubber was very profitable to both colonial government and large French metropolitan companies given that the latter's combined output was nearly equivalent to the total latex output in Indochina. As a result, the government was very involved in economic activity "[f]rom the control of goods prices and financial or fiscal support... to the policing of worker dissent" to safeguard this very profitable export industry. Hence, while rubber planters and colonial administrators did not always agree on matters relating to the rubber industry, these large European plantations were the main sources of revenue in inter-war Vietnam, and were powerful symbols of the intricate symbiotic relationship between the colonial government and French commercial interests. By the time Phu Rieng Do broke up in 1930, the largest rubber plantations had formed the Section autonome de l'Union des planteurs de Caoutchouc de l'Indochine (Indochina Rubber Planters' Union) to further their interests.

Given their close relationship, one area of cooperation between government and planter was in labour procurement. With the increase in rubber demand after the First World War, large European plantations began to expand from their original sites of an arc 300 km long and about 40 km wide southeast to northwest of Saigon, to areas further north. This expansion depleted local labour supplies and resulted in a severe labour shortage by mid-1920s. In response, the director of labour recruitment, Herve Bazin, provided thousands of coolies to these large rubber plantations from "the overcrowded villages of the Red River Delta in Tonkin and the coastal lowlands of Annam", swelling the ranks of these poor migrant workers from 3,242 in 1922 to 41,750 in 1928.

=== Diffusion of communist influence from north to south ===
What seemed like a simple solution of channelling excess labour to areas of need actually sowed the seeds for Phu Rieng Do as the growth of communism started in northern Vietnam and spread to the south through the many migrant workers employed by rubber plantations in Cochinchina during the "rubber boom" from 1923 to 1928. One such northern worker was Trần Tử Bình, and he was to play a significant role in the strike.

Hence, although the colonial authorities tried to stamp out the danger of communist infiltration in 1929 – 1930 by getting the Sûreté to screen and "to weed out workers deemed politically undesirable and potential trouble-makers", this attempt ultimately failed given the sheer numbers of labourers who were recruited. Moreover, the employment terms – where food, shelter and wage were given in exchange for three years of service – tied these northern labourers to a form indentured labour with its many unstated obligations. In other words, communist or communist-inspired elements who slipped through the screening found ready listeners among these impoverished workers who usually felt compelled to extend their unfavourable contract because the accumulation of debts necessitated their repeated borrowing from moneylenders.

Moreover, it did not help that many of these recruited northerners were driven to destitution in the first place by a money-based capitalist economy. This was an effect of colonialism where cash economy had penetrated the rural economy. Consequently, both land and individual taxes had "to be paid in... solid silver piasters, which peasants often had to acquire solely for this purpose at marked-up rates of exchange from money lenders or landlords." Hence, these peasants had to resort to borrowing at inflated rates which resulted in many of them being trapped in unending indebtedness.

The new agrarian capitalism also divided society into the haves and the have-nots of land ownership, with the latter having to "sell their labour in order to subsist." For those peasants who thought they could continue to live off subsistence farming, the aforementioned tax system was actually pulling them deeper into the cash economy. As a result, many smallholders were expropriated while tenants, sharecroppers and wage-labourers were trapped in debts. Given the impoverished socio-economic condition of these peasants, the communists were winning these northerners over to their cause when they went to work in rubber plantations such as the one at Phu Rieng.

== Communist activities before the strike ==
In the decade prior to the outbreak of Phu Rieng Do, "a small politically conscious laboring [sic] class" had emerged in the 22,000 Vietnamese workers of which 36.8% were found in the modern agricultural sector. This, however, "made up no more than 2 per cent of the population." In other words, the pool of potential followers of the communist movement was small. Moreover, the communists were also fragmented in their various parties. In early 1930, "party leaders therefore opposed the use of revolutionary violence until the Communist movement could be unified and more fully developed." As such, the Viet Nam Cong San Dang (VNCSD) or the Communist Party of Vietnam began to strengthen itself through "the establishment of cells in factories, railroad works, mines, plantations, schools and military units." Popular-based organisations such as self-defence and mutual aid groups were also targeted in order to bring more people into their orbit of influence.

Unsurprisingly then, at Michelin's plantation in Phú Riềng, "the party branch position was to... organize mutual aid associations, sports teams, and arts groups to bring the masses together and to win them over." In fact, the Lao Dong Cong San or Communist Workers was already preparing for Phu Rieng Do as early as October 1929. To ensure success of the strike, members of this communist cell began to establish "hidden food caches, and making a pact with some of the local tribespeople whereby the latter promised not to serve as strikebreakers for the French." In reality, however, many of these coolies "had little or no intention of remaining in the position of full-time proletarians" but were instead more eager to return to their homes in northern Vietnam after fulfilling their contracts or having earned enough to pay the obligatory colonial taxes and other debts. This did not hinder the communists from capitalising on the grim day-to-day experience of these coolies whose squalid living quarters "were reportedly littered with communist pamphlets."

== The Phu Rieng Do strike ==
The strike at the sprawling 5,500 hectares Michelin rubber plantation in Phú Riềng took place on 4 February 1930, the sixth day of Tết, the Vietnamese Lunar New Year. It was noted that an air of "millenarian excitement [had] gripped Phu Rieng workers" where emotions ran high at this time of "spiritual renewal". Consequently, the strike began when 300 workers refused to work "under the pretext of attending the burial of a co-worker." The communists had capitalised on the man's death to stir up anti-French emotions by attributing it to oppressive plantation management. However, by the time the local Delegue Administratif went to investigate the incident on 5 February, the workers had resumed their duties. The peace did not last when a foreman was arrested on the same day for alleged theft from the workers.

This foreman was a certain "Comrade Lu" who was said to be sympathetic to the workers. When he discovered a spy sent by the plantation management to gather intelligence for the work cessation the day before, he gave chase but was arrested by French foremen who accused him of theft instead. When the workers got news of this, 1,300 of them gathered "in a village on the plantation and would not disperse on orders from the Delegue and his twenty police escorts." Instead, they demanded the release of Lu. The workers also repeated their demands made earlier on 30 January, the first day of Tết, for the dismissal of two greatly despised assistant managers and to have eight-hour work day amongst others. This implies that Soumagnac, the plantation manager, had underestimated the situation when the workers first articulated their demands on 30 January.

These earlier demands were made in a veiled fashion when Trần Tử Bình, together with two other communists, "comrade Hong" and "comrade Ta", reciprocated Soumagnac's customary Tết greeting with their own, cleverly weaving in other requests of "not to steal or dock our pay, not to beat us... not to collect head taxes from us any more". In response, Soumagnac "hemmed and hawed and promised he would consider the demands." Things came to a head when "his office was surrounded by angry workers three days later" to demand Lu's release and only then "did he telephone the nearest military post for reinforcements." However, the workers were able to "disarm seven soldiers and send an entire platoon into retreat."

=== Discrepancies in the dates of events ===
At this juncture, it may be of interest to highlight discrepancies in the dates of events in the narrative by Tran Bu Binh and David Marr with that by Cedric Allen Sampson. From Trần's account, the funeral for a fellow worker seemed to have taken place on 31 January, the second day of Tết, and the arrest of Lu on 1 February, the third day of Tết. This culminated in the surrounding of Soumagnac's office on that same day till 2 February, the fourth day of Tết. This agrees with Marr's reading of the event that Soumagnac only made a telephone call to the military post three days after 30 January, on 2 February.

On the other hand, Sampson wrote that the strike began on 4 February, the sixth day of Tết, with the workers stopping work on the pretext of a fellow worker's burial. To Sampson, the arrest of foreman Lu took place on 5 February or the seventh day of Tết. Regardless of the actual dates, however, both narratives agree that the funeral and the arrest of Lu were trigger events for the strike, which culminated in the workers surrounding Soumagnac's office, forcing him to telephone for military aid.

=== Negotiation and victory celebrations ===
Trần Tử Bình was amongst those representing the workers to negotiate with the plantation owners. Under duress, Soumagnac, representing the owners, signed an agreement granting all demands of the workers. Revolutionary festivities began after that with a march from Soumagnac's house to other parts of the plantation. In their demonstrations of victory, the hammer and sickle was raised and "The Internationale" was sung. Soon, the workers were bold enough to fire the captured rifles into the air followed by the burning of office files. Supplies stores were broken into and the workers helped themselves to the food. After their "torchlight banquet", the workers entertained themselves with cheo, or traditional Vietnamese opera performance. In the midst of all these, "all supervisory staff were allowed to flee the plantation."

=== Deliberation on the next course of action ===
Within the communist leadership, two diametrically opposed options were mooted. The first, which was to fight the French when they returned with a larger force, was popular with the majority of workers whose confidence was boosted by their recent victory. Trần Tử Bình, on the other hand, cautioned that the time was not ripe as the party "[had] not yet directed [them] to seize power." He felt that Phu Rieng Do could not afford to be isolated from the liberation of the entire country as this would mean a swift crushing by the concentrated forces of the French. Unable to resolve the dilemma, the strike simply continued.

== French response ==
When news of Phu Rieng Do reached Jean-Félix Krautheimer, Lieutenant-Governor of Cochinchina, he despatched the gendarmerie regiments from Biên Hòa and Saigon to the plantation to restore peace. This force of "three hundred legionnaires and five hundred red sash troops" quickly ended the strike and the leaders were arrested. The arrests, however, "provoked the only serious clashes during the dispute." Pierre Pasquier, Governor-general of Indochina, defended Krautheimer's decision as he was convinced that "'credulous' plantation workers made willing, if unwitting, communist recruits", which reflected his assessment of Phu Rieng Do as a communist-instigated unrest.

The arrested leaders of the strike were put on trial on 1 April 1930. However, they were convicted "not on the basis of witness testimony, but by the Sûreté political intelligence reports sent to the Biên Hòa Tribunal correctionnel in mid-March." Such reports were gathered by the labour inspectorate, established in 1927, for the original purpose of "monitoring plantations and wage levels" to safeguard the welfare of workers. These reports, however, soon took on a policing slant with information from "regional officials and policemen... [regarding] plantation conditions and the 'mood' prevailing inside the lines." In fact, such intelligence was the basis for deployment of the police for pre-emptive monitoring of workplaces. Hence, the conviction of the Phu Rieng Do ringleaders served to exemplify the intertwining of colonial political and economic interests such that activities of the police were largely swayed by "the operation of colonial wage economies and the extent to which corporate and settler interests controlled them."

=== Punishment of the ringleaders ===
Although there were no casualties or major damage to property, the heavy sentences of between six months and five years' imprisonment meted out to the ringleaders reflected the "combination of harsh labour discipline and fear of sedition that informed government responses to industrial protest." Trần Tử Bình was given a five years' sentence on Côn Sơn prison island where, ironically, he was further schooled in Marxist–Leninist ideology.

=== Dismissal of Michelin's case ===
The Michelin management was disturbed by the fact that "a handful of communists had managed to convince 1,300 coolies to join the strike action" and was therefore convinced that its plantation was not given adequate protection. In response, the government "shifted responsibility for the strike's escalation... to the maltreatment that made the workforce receptive to communist propaganda in the first place." In fact, Pasquier even "assigned his economic affairs division in Hanoi to investigate health and hygiene standards on Michelin's estates." The official stance on the case was to deflect "attention from the company's accusation that local police and troop levels were too low."

== Reasons for the strike ==
Michelin's rubber plantation at Phú Riềng was a classic example of the hand-in-glove collaboration between colonial administrative and economic interests where the colony had "her every economic fabric attuned to the demands of financial and industrial interests in France." As such, costs for the upkeep of workers were kept to a minimum for maximum profit and this resulted in dire living and working conditions. This situation was further compounded by effects of the Great Depression, which then led to ready support for the communist-led strike.

=== Inhospitable living conditions ===
Given the priority for economic output, living conditions on the plantation were "abysmal" with frequent outbreaks of malaria, only to be made worse by food and water that were often contaminated or scarce. The workers were housed in villages of "between 300 and 500" each. Inside each village, the workers slept in barracks that were hot and humid which became flooded during the rainy season. Such barracks with their long bunks, however, were cost effective even if they were unconducive for living.

=== Harsh working conditions ===
Although Michelin only entered the rubber industry in 1926, with only 1,800 of its 5,500 hectares plantation at Phu Rieng planted in 1931, all aspects of production were highly labour intensive. Manual labour was required from clearing large tracts of malaria-infested virgin forests to the planting and caring for the saplings. As such, the already harsh working conditions were worsened by long hours of work. In general, the entire "rubber plantation work force never exceeded 41,000 in any one year" because the harsh conditions resulted in high numbers of death and escape.

Tellingly, just one year into operation, the death rate of Phu Rieng workers in 1927 was a high 17%, which was considered a conservative figure as the plantation management had reason to under report. It was said that about a hundred names were recorded on the death register of the plantation each month. Unable to bear with the hardship, many workers also resorted to desertion. In 1925 and 1926, "about one in every ten plantation workers deserted."

A direct contributing factor to the harshness of the workplace was "the ceaseless efforts of overseers to compel reluctant coolies to work." These Vietnamese cais often used "intimidation, harassment, and physical violence in order to squeeze labour-time out of direct producers." Bullying was also institutionalised with the European overseers contriving "an extensive system of fines to punish coolies for infractions and alleged violations of plantation rules" which usually resulted in the docking of wages. Compliance and docility were exacted from workers through the use of physical abuse such as beatings and floggings.

=== Effects of the Great Depression ===
The prices of rubber began to fall in 1929 and finally reached its lowest mark in 1931-1932. This was a challenge to the governments in Hanoi and Saigon long used to reaping high profits from rubber exports and "taxes imposed on commercial property and on migrant workers flooding into Cochin-China's wage economy." Hence, in a bid to correct budget deficits, the colonial government increased taxation while devaluing the piaster. This resulted in wage-earners such as Phu Rieng workers to suffer the dual blows of reduced purchasing power and higher taxation. However, the plantation owners and the authorities failed to grasp the potential impact of the workers' grievances as the former was more concerned about declining profits while the latter, ironically, was nervous over possible dissent in the top export industry of rubber.

=== Instigation by local communist cadres ===
As mentioned earlier, the communists recognised their structural and numerical weaknesses and this prompted the VNCSD to "avoid precipitous and premature action." Although the VNCSD was not yet strong enough to take on the French colonial government, "unless it confronted the authority it would lose prestige as a revolutionary organization." This dilemma resolved itself when "local Communist cells began to precipitate indirect confrontation through strikes and work stoppages" of which Phu Rieng Do was the first. This rendered the upper hierarchy a mere follower in the face of the agency exercised by the lower echelons that "acted independently, without directives, to lead the people against the French."

Therefore, while Phu Rieng Do was a communist-instigated strike, its launch had no authorisation from "either the Regional or Central committees of the VNCSD as part of the overall strategy for Viet Nam [sic]." In fact, according to Nguyen Nghia, a southern communist leader, the "Provisional Executive Committee of the VNCSD in Cochinchina did not order overt action until May 1." In other words, despite its official portrayal as the "first Party directed strike action of the 1930 campaign", the reality was that subsequent strikes in other parts of Vietnam after Phu Rieng Do merely followed this pattern of "independent action by lower echelon Communists" who responded to "fortuitous circumstances" such as the death of a rubber plantation worker.

== Implications of Phu Rieng Do for the communist movement ==
The dilemma that Trần Tử Bình and his comrades faced when they deliberated on their next course of action was a case writ large for careful consideration of strategy and tactics in subsequent communist-instigated uprisings. They were in a catch-22 where the choice to preserve strength would diminish the credibility of the communists as a viable anti-colonial force, potentially hastening the demise of the already numerically weak movement; taking action from a position of weakness, however, would stretch the resources of the communists and similarly risk the destruction of the movement by the government. Therefore, while stalemate rendered the Phu Rieng cell leaders passive, the decisions made by communist higher echelons in the case of Nghệ-Tĩnh Soviets where the party overplayed its hand in a "suicidal struggle against great odds", almost led to its total annihilation as an organisation. Hence, the nascent communist party still had a long way to go in the maturation of its ideology, organisation and of its grasp of timing in the 1930s.

This, however, was a necessary time of experimentation as the period between 1925 and 1945 was what David Marr considered the "full emergence of a new anti-colonial generation", superseding the previous one of scholar-gentry led anti-colonial movement of 1885 to 1925. Essentially, the communist movement that emerged as part of this new generation was able to combine and articulate its goal as being both "anti-imperialist" and "anti-feudal", something that eluded the previous generation and whose leaders were thought to be "too conservative, too traditionalist, in outlook". In a bid for success, risk-taking was therefore a necessary evil as the communists had to explore and navigate through the many uncertainties and challenges of that time.

== See also ==
- Yên Bái mutiny
- Nghệ-Tĩnh Soviets
