= List of governors-general of French Equatorial Africa =

French Equatorial Africa

This is a list of European colonial administrators (French: Gouverneur général de l'Afrique équatoriale française) responsible for the territory of French Equatorial Africa, an area equivalent to modern-day Gabon, Republic of the Congo, Central African Republic and Chad.

== List ==
(Dates in italics indicate de facto continuation of office)

| Tenure | Portrait | Incumbent | Notes |
|---|---|---|---|
| 1 August 1886 to 28 September 1897 | | Pierre Savorgnan de Brazza, Commissioner-General | |
| 1 August 1886 to 1 October 1886 | | Georges Élie Pradier, acting Commissioner-General | Acting for Brazza |
| 1 October 1886 to March 1887 | | Charles de Chavannes, acting Commissioner-General | 1st time; acting for Brazza |
| 16 January 1888 to May 1890 | | Noël Ballay, acting Commissioner-General | Acting for Brazza |
| 25 November 1891 to March 1892 | | Charles de Chavannes, acting Commissioner-General | 2nd time; acting for Brazza |
| April 1892 to May 1892 | | Charles de Chavannes, acting Commissioner-General | 3rd time; acting for Brazza |
| June 1892 to March 1893 | | Charles de Chavannes, acting Commissioner-General | 4th time; acting for Brazza |
| 17 March 1893 to 6 October 1893 | | Alphonse Edouard Lippmann, acting Commissioner-General | Acting for Brazza |
| October 1893 to November 1893 | | E. Gervais, acting Commissioner-General | Acting for Brazza |
| December 1893 to May 1894 | | Charles de Chavannes, acting Commissioner-General | 5th time; acting for Brazza |
| May 1894 to 1 June 1894 | | Jean-Marie Le Divellec, acting Commissioner-General | Acting for Brazza |
| 1 June 1894 to November 1894 | | Albert Dolisie, acting Commissioner-General | 1st time; acting for Brazza |
| January 1895 to January 1896 | | Albert Dolisie, acting Commissioner-General | 2nd time; acting for Brazza |
| March 1897 to 28 September 1897 | | Albert Dolisie, acting Commissioner-General | 3rd time; acting for Brazza |
| 28 September 1897 to 28 April 1900 | | Henri-Félix de Lamothe, Commissioner-General | |
| June 1898 to October 1898 | | Albert Dolisie, acting Commissioner-General | 4th time; acting for Lamothe |
| October 1898 to April 1899 | | Martial Henri Merlin, acting Commissioner-General | Acting for Lamothe |
| October 1899 to March 1900 | | Jean-Baptiste Philémon Lemaire, acting Commissioner-General | Acting for Lamothe |
| 28 April 1900 to December 1900 | | Jean-Baptiste Philémon Lemaire, acting Commissioner-General | |
| December 1900 to 1902 | | Albert Grodet, acting Commissioner-General | |
| 1902 to 1903 | | Charles Noufflard, acting Commissioner-General | |
| 1903 to 21 January 1904 | | Arnaud, acting Commissioner-General | |
| 21 January 1904 to 13 February 1908 | | Émile Gentil, Commissioner-General | |
| 17 August 1905 to 11 May 1906 | | Édouard Émile Léon Telle, acting Commissioner-General | Acting for Gentil |
| 25 September 1906 to 5 April 1907 | | Alfred Fourneau, acting Commissioner-General | Acting for Gentil |
| 5 April 1907 to 28 June 1908 | | Alfred Albert Martineau, acting Commissioner-General | Acting for Gentil |
| 28 June 1908 to 15 May 1917 | | Martial Henri Merlin, Governor-General | |
| 28 June 1908 to 16 February 1909 | | Alfred Albert Martineau, acting Governor-General | Acting for Merlin |
| 18 October 1909 to 1910 | | Charles Amédée Rognon, acting Governor-General | 1st time; acting for Merlin |
| 1910 | | Adolphe Cureau, acting Governor-General | Acting for Merlin |
| 1910 to 6 March 1911 | | Charles Amédée Rognon, acting Governor-General | 2nd time; acting for Merlin |
| 6 March 1911 to 1911 | | Édouard Dubosc-Taret, acting Governor-General | Acting for Merlin |
| 1911 to 11 May 1911 | | Charles Henri Vergnes, acting Governor-General | 1st time; acting for Merlin |
| 17 October 1912 to c. May 1913 | | Charles Henri Vergnes, acting Governor-General | 2nd time; acting for Merlin |
| c. May 1913 to 17 November 1913 | | Georges Virgile Poulet, acting Governor-General | Acting for Merlin |
| 17 November 1913 to 14 September 1914 | | Frédéric Estèbe, acting Governor-General | 1st time; acting for Merlin |
| 15 May 1917 to 16 May 1920 | | Gabriel Louis Angoulvant, Governor-General | |
| 17 June 1917 to 23 July 1918 | | Frédéric Estèbe, acting Governor-General | 2nd time; acting for Angoulvant |
| August 1918 to 16 May 1920 | | Frédéric Estèbe, acting Governor-General | 3rd time; acting for Angoulvant |
| 16 May 1920 to 5 September 1920 | | Maurice Lapalud, acting Governor-General | |
| 5 September 1920 to 21 August 1923 | | Victor Augagneur, Governor-General | |
| 21 August 1923 to 8 July 1924 | | Robert Paul Marie de Guise, acting Governor-General | 1st time |
| 8 July 1924 to 1924 | | Matteo Mathieu Maurice Alfassa, acting Governor-General | 1st time |
| 1924 to 1 October 1924 | | Robert Paul Marie de Guise, acting Governor-General | 2nd time |
| 1 October 1924 to 16 October 1924 | | Matteo Mathieu Maurice Alfassa, acting Governor-General | 2nd time |
| 16 October 1924 to 20 September 1934 | | Raphaël Antonetti, Governor-General | |
| 11 May 1925 to December 1925 | | Matteo Mathieu Maurice Alfassa, acting Governor-General | 3rd time; acting for Antonetti |
| 22 January 1927 to 1927 | | Jean Marchessou, acting Governor-General | 1st time; acting for Antonetti |
| 1927 to 17 October 1927 | | Joseph-François Reste, acting Governor-General | 1st time; acting for Antonetti |
| November 1929 to August 1930 | | Matteo Mathieu Maurice Alfassa, acting Governor-General | 4th time; acting for Antonetti |
| 27 November 1930 to 11 March 1931 | | Adolphe Deitte, acting Governor-General | Acting for Antonetti |
| December 1932 to 11 December 1933 | | Matteo Mathieu Maurice Alfassa, acting Governor-General | 5th time; acting for Antonetti |
| 20 September 1934 to 16 October 1934 | | Jean Marchessou, acting Governor-General | 2nd time |
| 16 October 1934 to 15 March 1935 | | Georges Édouard Alexandre Renard, Governor-General | |
| 20 March 1935 to 5 April 1936 | | Jean Marchessou, acting Governor-General | 3rd time |
| 5 April 1936 to 21 April 1939 | | Joseph-François Reste, Governor-General | 2nd time |
| 21 April 1939 to 3 September 1939 | | Léon Solomiac, acting Governor-General | |
| 3 September 1939 to 28 August 1940 | | Pierre Boisson, Governor-General | |
| 17 July 1940 to 28 August 1940 | | Louis Husson, acting Governor-General | Acting for Boisson |
| 28 August 1940 to 12 November 1940 | | Edgard de Larminat, acting Governor-General | Deposed in the Battle of Gabon |
| 12 November 1940 to 30 December 1940 | | Adolphe Sicé, acting Governor-General | |
| 30 December 1940 to 17 May 1944 | | Félix Éboué, Governor-General | Acting to 15 July 1944 |
| August 1941 to July 1942 | | Adolphe Sicé, High Commissioner of Free French Africa | |
| 15 February 1944 to 3 August 1946 | | André Bayardelle, Governor-General | Acting to 2 October 1944 (for Éboué to 17 May 1944) |
| 3 August 1946 to 5 June 1947 | | Jean Louis Marie André Soucadaux, acting Governor-General | 1st time |
| 5 June 1947 to 5 July 1947 | | Laurent Péchoux, acting Governor-General | |
| 5 July 1947 to 17 September 1947 | | Charles Luizet, Governor-General | |
| 17 September 1947 to 26 March 1948 | | Jean Louis Marie André Soucadaux, Governor-General | 2nd time; acting to 15 November 1947 |
| 26 March 1948 to 21 September 1951 | | Bernard Cornut-Gentille, Governor-General | |
| 21 September 1951 to 4 April 1957 | | Paul Louis Gabriel Chauvet, Governor-General | |
| 4 April 1957 to 29 January 1958 | | Paul Louis Gabriel Chauvet, High Commissioner | |
| 29 January 1958 to 15 July 1958 | | Pierre Messmer, High Commissioner | |
| 15 July 1958 to 15 August 1960 | | Yvon Bourges, High Commissioner | |

== See also ==
- French Equatorial Africa
- Chad
  - French Chad
- Central African Republic
  - Ubangi-Shari
- Republic of the Congo
  - French Congo
- Gabon
- Lists of office-holders
- List of French possessions and colonies
- French colonial empire
- French colonial flags
