= Jean-Félix Krautheimer =

Governor of French Cochinchina
- In office 1929–1934
- Governor: Pierre Pasquier
- Preceded by: Paul Marie Alexis Joseph Blanchard de la Brosse
- Succeeded by: Pierre André Michel Pagès

Personal details
- Born: November 1, 1874
- Died: 1943

Jean-Félix Krautheimer (1 November 1908–1943) was a French colonial administrator who served as the governor of French Cochinchina from 1929 to 1934.

Prior to his tenure as governor he was mayor of Chợ Lớn from 1905 to 1907, and administrator of Guangzhouwan on two occasions from 1919 to 1923. During his time as governor the Phú Riềng Đỏ was suppressed and several of the Spratly Islands were annexed into Cochinchina.

== Early life ==
Jean-Félix Krautheimer was born on 3 December 1874.

== Career ==
Krautheimer came to work in French Indochina on 1 November 1908. From 30 December 1905 to 3 January 1907, he was the mayor of Chợ Lớn. was the French administrator of Guangzhouwan from 1919 to 1922, and from 1922 to 1923. He was the governor of French Cochinchina from 1929 to 1934, before being replaced by Pierre André Michel Pagès. Eugéne Henri Eutrope was acting governor of Cochinchina from 21 November 1931 to 11 November 1932, while Krautheimer was on leave.

In 1930, he was involved in suppression of the Phú Riềng Đỏ rubber plantation strikes. Krautheimer issued a degree in which taxes would be paid in the commune of residence rather than the commune of birth starting on 1 July 1930.

The Spratly Islands of Amboyna Cay, Taiping Island, Song Tử, Loaita Island, and Thitu Island were annexed into Cochinchina by a degree signed by Krautheimer on 21 December 1933.

The Legion of Honour was given to Krautheimer.

== Death ==
Krautheimer died in 1943.

== Works cited ==
=== Books ===
- Annuaire général de l'Indo-Chine. Imprimerie D'Extreme Orient. 1912. ISBN 9780822947028 – via Gallica.
- Corfield, Justin (2013). Historical Dictionary of Ho Chi Minh City. Anthem Press. ISBN 9780857282859.

=== News ===
- "Chronique de Haiphong". La Volonté Indochinoise. 9 June 1926.
- "Vietnam's sovereignty over Hoang Sa in the French colonial period". VietNamNet. 28 June 2014. Archived from the original on 7 July 2025.
- Roubaud, Louis (4 July 1930). "Le Bon Exemple De La Cochinchine". Le Petit Parisien.
