= Dambach-la-Ville =

Dambach-la-Ville Dàmbàch
- Commune
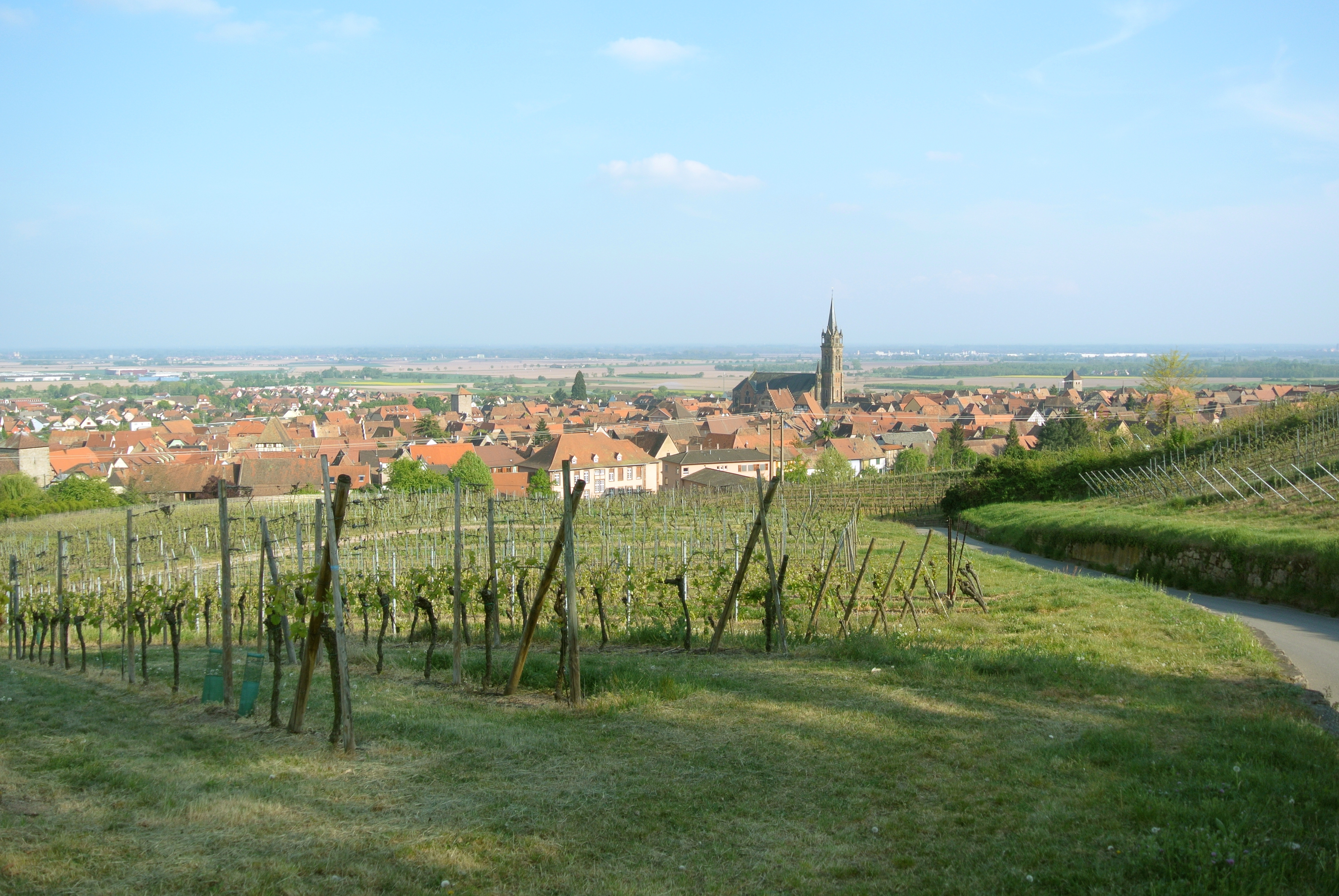
- Panorama of Dambach-la-Ville, seen towards southeast and the plain

- Coat of arms
- Location of Dambach-la-Ville
- Location within France Location within Grand Est
- Coordinates: 48°19′29″N 7°25′41″E
- Country: France
- Region: Grand Est
- Department: Bas-Rhin
- Arrondissement: Sélestat-Erstein
- Canton: Obernai

Government
  - Mayor (2020–2026): Claude Hauller
- Area^{1}: 28.83 km^{2} (11.13 sq mi)
- Highest elevation: 662 m (2,172 ft)
- Lowest elevation: 164 m (538 ft)
- Population (2023): 2,165
  - Density: 75.10/km^{2} (194.5/sq mi)
- Demonym: Dambachois
- Time zone: UTC+01:00 (CET)
  - Summer (DST): UTC+02:00 (CEST)
- INSEE/Postal code: 67084 /67650
- ^{1} French Land Register data, which excludes lakes, ponds, glaciers > 1 km^{2} (0.386 sq mi or 247 acres) and river estuaries.

Dambach-la-Ville (French pronunciation: [dɑ̃bak la vil]; German: Dambach) is a commune in the Bas-Rhin department in Alsace in north-eastern France.

It lies northwest of Sélestat, on the eastern slopes of the Vosges mountains.

Dambach-la-Ville is known for its quality wines.

== History ==
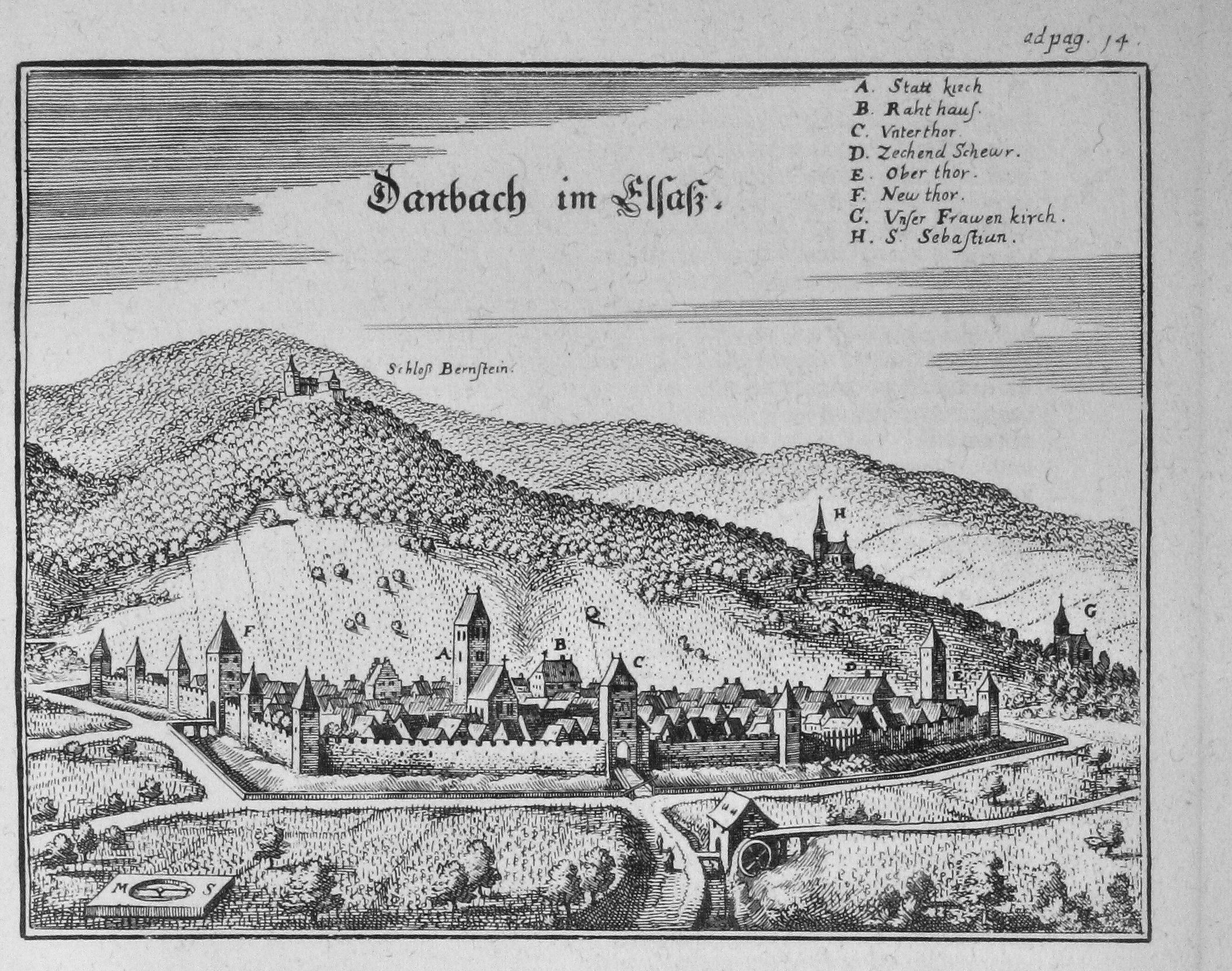
A sketch of Dambach in 1663 by Matthäus Merian the Younger.

The village was first recorded in 1125 as Tambacum. In the thirteenth century, the Bishop of Strasbourg, Berthold I of Teck, made Dambach annex two local villages, Altenwiller and Oberkirch. The Chapelle of Saint-Sébastien is located in what used to be Oberkirch.

== Population ==
Historical population
Year	Pop.	±% p.a.
1968	2,051	—
1975	2,039	−0.08%
1982	1,907	−0.95%
1990	1,800	−0.72%
1999	1,973	+1.02%
2007	1,924	−0.31%
2012	2,016	+0.94%
2017	2,201	+1.77%
2023	2,165	−0.27%
Source: INSEE

== Twin towns ==
Dambach-la-Ville is twinned with:

- Wemding, Germany - 1988

== Wine ==
Dambach-la-Ville is the largest wine-producing village in Alsace. Its vineyards produce one of the finest Alsacian wines: the Grand Cru Frankstein.

== Notable residents ==
- Gédéon Geismar

== See also ==
- Communes of the Bas-Rhin department
