= Trần Tử Bình =

Vietnamese revolutionary

Major General Trần Tử Bình
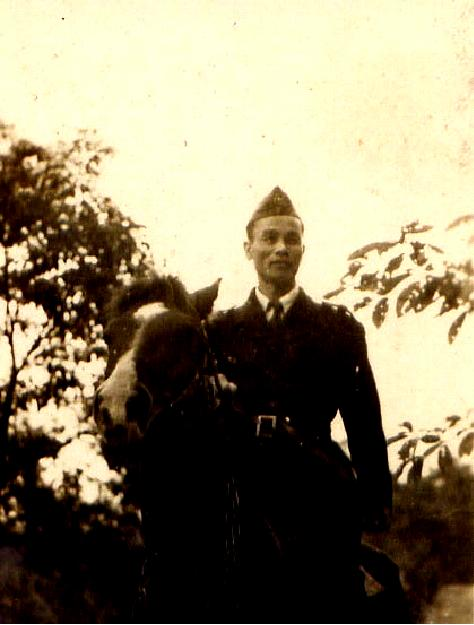
- Trần Tử Bình (right) and Tôn Đức Thắng (left) (Việt Bắc, 1951)

Personal details
- Born: Phạm Văn Phu; 1907 Bình Lục, Hà Nam, Tonkin (French protectorate)
- Died: 1967 (aged 59–60) Hà Nội, Democratic Republic of Vietnam
- Party: Communist Party of Vietnam
- Awards: Gold Star Order; Ho Chi Minh Order

Military service
- Allegiance: Democratic Republic of Vietnam
- Branch/service: People's Army of Vietnam
- Rank: Major general
- Battles/wars: First Indochina War

Trần Tử Bình (1907–1967) was a Vietnamese revolutionary who later became one of the first generals of the Democratic Republic of Vietnam (1948) and Vietnam's Ambassador to People's Republic of China (1959–1967).

Trần Tử Bình was originally named Phạm Văn Phu. Later, during revolutionary time he changed his name into Trần Tử Bình (a name which means "man who can die for peace"). He is most famous for being a leader of Phú Riềng Đỏ labor movement in 1930 and one of the most prominent diplomats of Vietnam, who worked as the Ambassador of Vietnam to China during period 1959–67.

Honours and Awards

- Gold Star
- Ho Chi Minh Order

== Biography ==
Trần Tử Bình was born in an all-Catholic village named Tieu Dong, Bình Lục District, Hà Nam Province in the Red River Delta of northern Vietnam. His family were poor peasants supported by his fathers income selling manure, which Trần described was the lowliest occupation in the village. His parents managed to scrape together enough money to enroll Trần Tử Bình at a seminary. At school, he was remembered as a brilliant but very restive and steady student. In 1926, because of the French priests disdain for him and his participation in the public mourning the death of Phan Chu Trinh, a prominent Vietnamese scholar-patriot, and mobilizing the students and young people in the neighbourhood to protest against French colonial rule in Vietnam, Trần Tử Bình was expelled from the seminary. His parents and relatives were very much disappointed about it but he did not regret it. In 1927, while reticently giving Bible lessons in schools, he befriended a revolutionary convinced Trần to proletarianize himself and later became a Communist party member. He had a strong belief that what he did was an obligation of any responsible Vietnamese. At that moment, without yet knowing it, Trần Tử Bình joined the ranks of the young patriot intelligentsia, a group destined to play a critical role in modern Vietnamese history.

=== Early revolutionary years ===
In 1927 he signed up to a working labor on Michelin's Phú Riềng rubber plantation in the distant region of southern Vietnam Cochinchina. This decision was another blow to the family because, even without a school diploma, with his education Trần Tử Bình could have found a respectable job as a village clerk or landlord's agent. Again Trần Tử Bình was determined to break away, to seek adventure, to test his physical and spiritual powers in the totally unfamiliar land. This decision proved crucial for his entire life.

It is during this period working in Phú Riềng plantation that he first met communist revolutionaries and learned about the Marxist–Leninist theory. In 1929 he joined the Indochina Communist Party. On 3 February 1930 he became the Party Secretary of Phú Riềng and directly led a revolt of more than 5000 workers against the cruel French colonial exploitation at rubber plantation. The movement was repressed by French, Phú Riềng strike leaders were all imprisoned, nonetheless it forced the Michelin company to make certain changes to improve labor's working and living conditions. The Phú Riềng's labor movement 1930, also known as Phu Rieng Do, has become known as the first big labor movement in the history of Vietnam. This remarkable period is chronicled in Trần Tử Bình's memoir, Red Earth: A Vietnamese Memoir of Life on a Colonial Rubber Plantation, first published in Hanoi in 1965, and translated into English in 1985.

After the Phu Rieng Do incident French colonial government sentenced Trần Tử Bình to 10 years on the infamous Côn Đảo Prison, where he met many communist revolutionary leaders of Vietnam, i.e. Tôn Đức Thắng, Hoang Quoc Viet, Phạm Văn Đồng, Le Van Luong, Pham Hung, Ha Huy Giap, Tran Xuan Do, Nguyen Van Phat and took advantage of this opportunity to improve his knowledge of communist ideology and nationalism.

=== August Revolution ===
In 1936, the Popular Front forced the French colonial government to release some political prisoners from Côn Đảo. Trần Tử Bình was one of them. After being amnestied from Côn Đảo he returned home to work as a clerk in Bình Lục District and secretly continued to take part in communist activities against French. From 1936-1940 Trần Tử Bình was appointed as communist party secretary of Bình Lục District and then party secretary of Ha Nam Province.

In 1940 he was elected by the communist party as a member of Northern Region (Tongkin) Committee (Xu Uy Bac Ky) and Commissar of Interregional Network C (including Hà Nam, Nam Đinh, Thái Bình, Ninh Binh Provinces) and network D (Vinh Phuc, Phuc Yen, Phu Tho, Tuyen Quang Provinces) in 1941 and 1943. He became one of the most wanted objects of French Gendarmerie in TongKing during the 1940s.

On 24 December 1943 Trần Tử Bình was arrested again in Thái Bình Province and was imprisoned in Hà Nam Prison. In early 1944, after an unsuccessful attempt at jailbreak, he was sent to Hỏa Lò Prison (Hanoi), where he became one of the organizers of a famous collective escape for over 100 political prisoners.

After he returned to the rear, Trần Tử Bình was appointed as a standing member of Xu Uy Bac Ky and was in charge of establishment and development of Hoa-Ninh-Thanh military base for the League for the Independence of Vietnam (Viet Minh).

On August 14, 1945, the Japanese surrendered to the Allies. The leaders of Viet Minh decided to act promptly to seize the power from the weak and helpless Trần Trọng Kim's pro-Japanese puppet government before the French returned. On 19 August 1945, Trần Tử Bình and Nguyen Khang, the two representatives of Xu Uy Bac Ky remained in Hanoi, directly commanded the general uprising in Hanoi and some neighboring provinces which lead to a start of the successful August Revolution of 1945.

=== Military and political career ===
After the establishment of the Democratic Republic of Vietnam, Trần Tử Bình was appointed as Vice Rector, Political Commissar of Tran Quoc Tuan Military Training Academy.

In 1947, he became Deputy Secretary of the General Political Department of Vietnamese People's Army. Late 1947, together with Lê Thiết Hùng, he successfully led the Vietnamese military forces to a military victory at Song Lo front.

On 1 January 1948, Trần Tử Bình was honored to receive a rank of major general and became one of the first 11 generals of the Democratic Republic of Vietnam along with other outstanding military officers like Võ Nguyên Giáp, Nguyễn Sơn, Lê Thiết Hùng, Chu Văn Tấn, Hoàng Sâm, Hoàng Văn Thái, Lê Hiến Mai, Văn Tiến Dũng, Trần Đại Nghĩa, Nguyễn Bình. In the same year he was appointed as Deputy Chief Inspector of the Vietnamese People's Army.

From 1950-56 he served as Political Commissar of the Vietnam's Ground Forces Officer Academy, which at that time was based in China. Since 1951 he was elected to be a representative of the Army Forces to the Third and Fourth National Communist Party Congress and member of the National Assembly.

After the First Indochina War (1946–54) general Trần Tử Bình was appointed as the Chief Inspector of the Army, Deputy Chief Inspector of the State. He served at these positions for two years (1956–58) before moved to the Ministry of Foreign Affairs following the personal request of president Ho Chi Minh.

In 1959, Trần Tử Bình was appointed as the Ambassador of Vietnam to the People's Republic of China and Mongolia. He worked as ambassador in China for two terms (1959–1967), perfectly performed his duty and contributed greatly to the development of cooperative relations between China and Vietnam.

On 11 February 1967, he died at the age 60 due to hypertension in Hanoi. He was honoured posthumously with the Gold Star medal, the most noble medal of the Socialist Republic of Vietnam, befitting his long service to the state and people of Vietnam.
