= List of governors-general of French Indochina =

Governor-General of French Indochina
- Gouverneur de l'Indochine Française (French); Đông Dương tổng thống toàn quyền đại thần (Vietnamese) អគ្គទេសាភិបាលឥណ្ឌូចិនបារាំង (Khmer) 東洋總統全權大臣 (chữ Hán) 法屬印度支那總督 (Traditional Chinese)
- Emblem of the government-general of French Indochina

- Vietnamese-style great seal and kiềm ấn of the governor-general of French Indochina (Note: Used on Classical Chinese language documents. The inscription of the great seal reads Đại Pháp Quốc Khâm mệnh Tổng thống Đông Dương Toàn quyền đại thần quan nho (大法國欽命總統東洋全權大臣關伩)) and the inscription of the kiềm ấn reads Toàn quyền đại thần (全權大臣, "governor-general") written in seal script.)

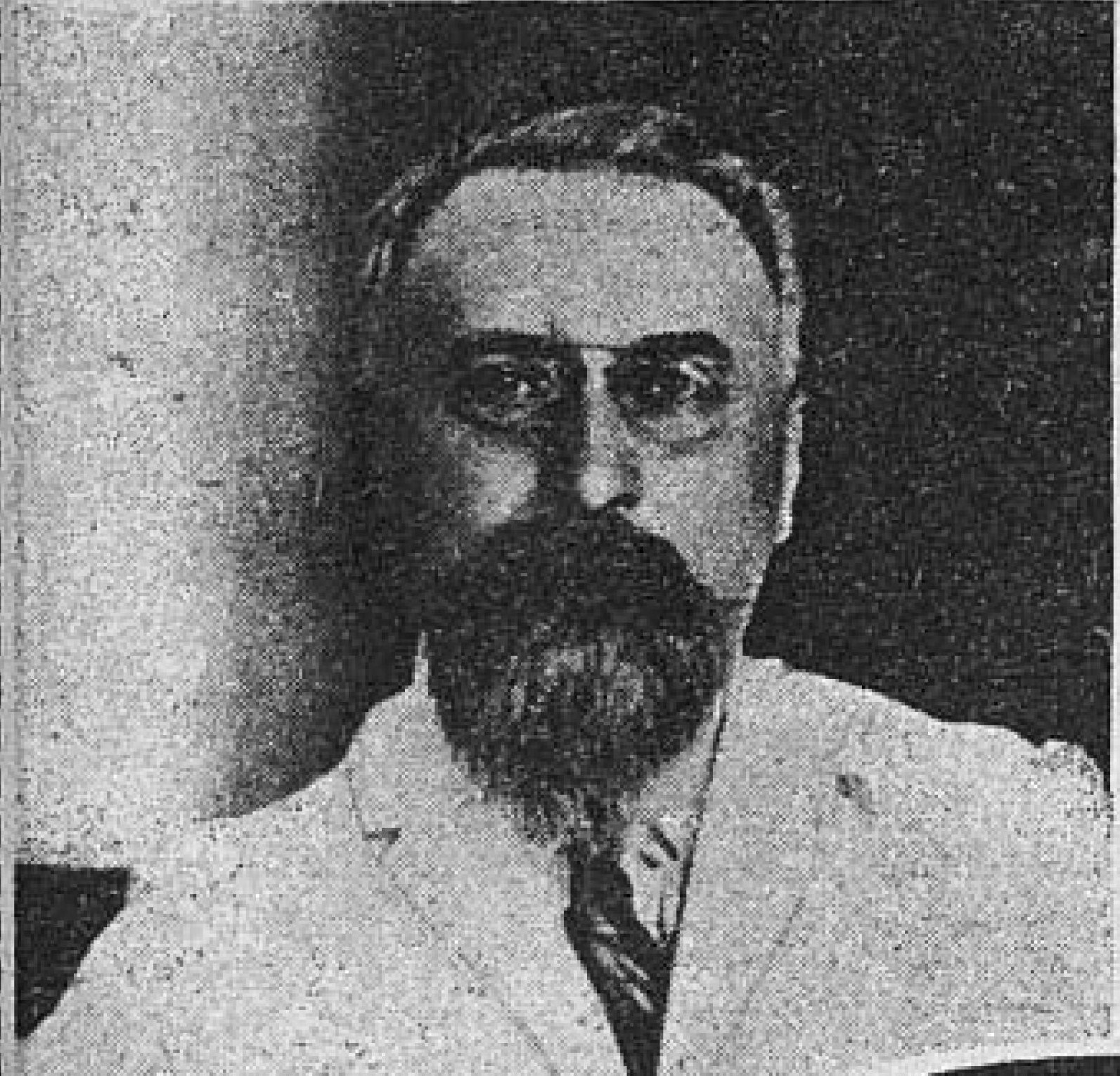
- Longest serving Pierre Pasquier; 26 December 1928 – 15 January 1934
- Member of: Government of France 日本の内閣
- Reports to: Ministry of the Colonies 拓務省
- Residence: Norodom Palace (1887–1902); Residence of the governor-general (1902–1945)
- Seat: Saigon, Cochinchina (1887–1902); Hanoi, Tonkin (1902–1945)
- Appointer: President of France Head of State (Vichy France) Emperor of Japan President of the Republic of China (Representing the Allied side in Tonkin) Monarch of Great Britain (Representing the Allied side in Cochinchina)
- Formation: 16 November 1887
- First holder: Jean Antoine Ernest Constans
- Final holder: Henri Hoppenot
- Abolished: 21 July 1956

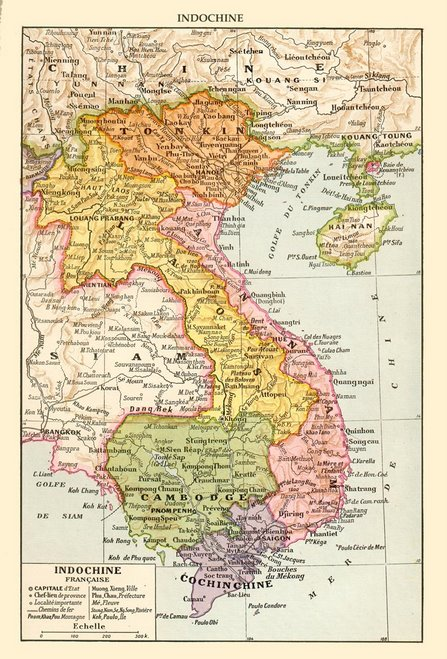
French Indochina (including Guangzhouwan), 1930.

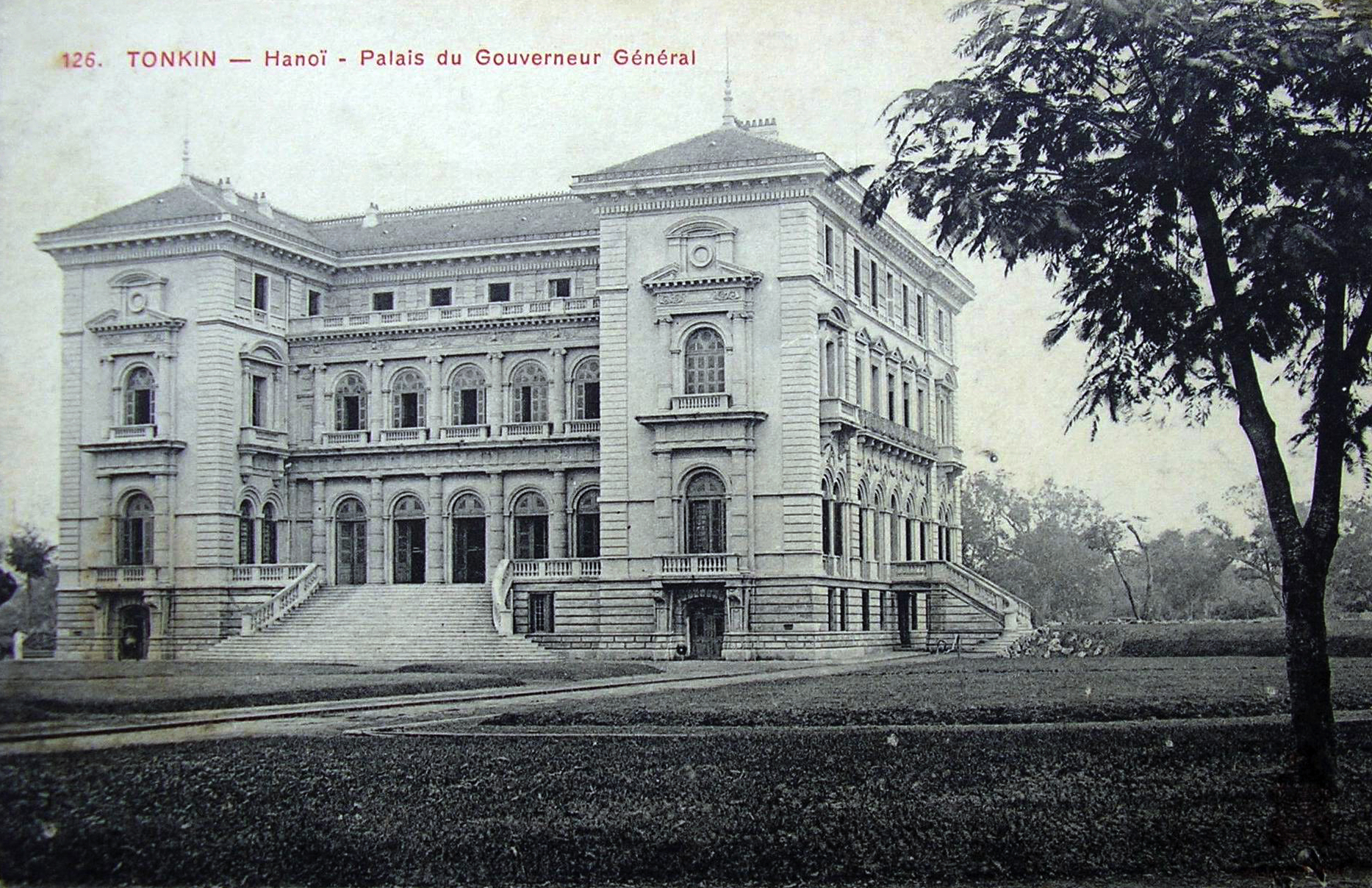
Residence of the governor-general in Hanoi, Tonkin

European (as well as Japanese and Chinese) colonial administrators (French: Gouverneurs généraux de l'Indochine française) had historically been responsible for the territory of French Indochina, an area equivalent to modern-day Vietnam, Laos, Cambodia, and the Chinese city of Zhanjiang.

== List of governors-general ==
The following have held the position of governor-general of French Indochina.

=== Pre–1945 ===
Tenure start	Tenure end	Incumbent	Notes
French Indochina formed (Cambodia, Annam, Tonkin, and Cochinchina, and from 19 April 1899, Laos)
Governors-general
16 November 1887	22 April 1888	Jean Antoine Ernest Constans	Provisional
22 April 1888	30 May 1889	Étienne Antoine Guillaume Richaud	Acting until 8 September 1888
31 May 1889	18 April 1891	Georges Jules Piquet	
18 April 1891	26 June 1891	François Marie Leon Bideau	Acting
26 June 1891	29 December 1894	Jean Marie Antoine de Lanessan	
10 March 1894	26 October 1894	Léon Jean Laurent Chavassieux	Acting for Lanessan
29 December 1894	16 March 1895	François Pierre Rodier	Acting
16 March 1895	10 December 1896	Paul Armand Rosseau	
21 October 1895	14 March 1896	Paul Julien Auguste Fourès	Acting for Rosseau. 1st time
10 December 1896	13 February 1897	Paul Julien Auguste Fourès	Acting. 2nd time
13 February 1897	14 March 1902	Joseph Athanase Paul Doumer	Future president of France.
29 September 1898	24 January 1899	Paul Julien Auguste Fourès	Acting for Doumer. 3rd time
16 February 1901	20 August 1901	Édouard Alfred Marie Broni	Acting for Doumer. 1st time
14 March 1902	14 October 1902	Édouard Alfred Marie Broni	Acting. 2nd time
15 October 1902	28 February 1908	Jean Baptiste Paul Beau	
28 February 1908	23 September 1908	Louis Alphonse Bonhoure	Acting
24 September 1908	17 February 1911	Antony Wladislas Klobukowski	
13 January 1910	10 June 1910	Albert Jean George Marie Louis Picquié	Acting for Klobukowski
17 February 1911	14 November 1911	Paul Louis Luce	Acting
15 November 1911	22 November 1913	Albert-Pierre Sarraut	1st time
22 November 1913	3 March 1915	Joost van Vollenhoven	Acting
3 March 1915	22 May 1916	Ernest Nestor Roume	
23 May 1916	21 January 1917	Jean-François dit Eugène Charles	Acting
22 January 1917	9 December 1919	Albert-Pierre Sarraut	2nd time
22 May 1919	19 February 1920	Maurice Antoine François Monguillot	Acting. 1st time
20 February 1920	15 April 1922	Maurice Long	
18 November 1920	31 March 1921	Joseph Maurice Le Gallen	Acting for Long
15 April 1922	9 August 1923	François Marius Baudouin	Acting
9 August 1923	23 April 1925	Martial Henri Merlin	
23 April 1925	18 November 1925	Maurice Antoine François Monguillot	2nd time
18 November 1925	22 August 1928	Alexandre Varenne	
4 October 1926	16 May 1927	Pierre Marie Antoine Pasquier	Acting for Varenne. 1st time
1 November 1927	7 August 1928	Maurice Antoine François Monguillot	Acting for Varenne. 3rd time
7 August 1928	26 December 1928	Eugène Jean Louis René Robert	Acting. 1st time
26 December 1928	15 January 1934	Pierre Marie Antoine Pasquier	2nd time
1 December 1930	30 June 1931	Eugène Jean Louis René Robert	Acting for Pasquier. 2nd time
15 January 1934	23 July 1934	Maurice Fernand Graffeuil	Acting
23 July 1934	9 September 1936	Eugène Jean Louis René Robert	Acting for Pasquier. 3rd time
9 September 1936	14 January 1937	Achille Louis Auguste Silvestre	Acting
14 January 1937	20 August 1939	Joseph-Jules Brévié	
20 August 1939	25 June 1940	Georges Catroux	Acting
25 June 1940	9 March 1945	Jean Decoux	Interim until 29 August 1940. Continued serving after the Japanese invasion; deposed in the Japanese coup d'état
Japanese military occupation
9 March 1945	28 August 1945	Yuitsu Tsuchihashi	Japanese military commander in Indochina and provisional governor-general
9 March 1945	15 August 1945	Takeshi Tsukamoto	Acting for Tsuchihashi
10 April 1945	September 1945	Gabriel Sabattier	PGFR delegate-general; in opposition to Japanese occupation after the coup. Retreated with remaining troops to China in May
Allied military administration
14 September 1945	14 May 1946	Lu Han	Military governor (Republic of China), above 16th parallel
13 September 1945	28 March 1946	Douglas Gracey	Military governor (United Kingdom), below 16th parallel

=== Post–1945 ===
No.	Portrait	Name (Birth–Death)	Term of office		
No.	Portrait	Name (Birth–Death)	Took office	Left office	Time in office
High commissioner (Hauts-commissaires de France en Indochine)
–	Jean Cédile [fr]	Jean Cédile (1908–1984); Acting	23 September 1945	5 October 1945	12 days
–	Philippe Leclerc de Hauteclocque	Philippe Leclerc de Hauteclocque (1902–1947); Acting	5 October 1945	31 October 1945	26 days
1	Georges Thierry d'Argenlieu	Georges Thierry d'Argenlieu (1889–1964); Appointed as the High Commissioner 17 August 1945, but did not enter his position until 2 November.	2 November 1945	27 March 1947	1 year, 145 days
2	Émile Bollaert	Émile Bollaert (1890–1978)	27 March 1947	20 October 1948	1 year, 207 days
3	Léon Pignon	Léon Pignon (1908–1976)	20 October 1948	13 December 1950	2 years, 54 days
4	Jean de Lattre de Tassigny	Jean de Lattre de Tassigny (1889–1952)	13 December 1950	11 January 1952 †	1 year, 29 days
5	Raoul Salan	Raoul Salan (1899–1984)	11 January 1952	18 April 1952	98 days
6	Jean Letourneau	Jean Letourneau (1907–1986)	18 April 1952	27 April 1953	1 year, 9 days
Commissioners-general (Commissaires généraux en Indochine)
1	Jean Letourneau	Jean Letourneau (1907–1986)	27 April 1953	23 July 1953	87 days
2	Maurice Dejean [fr]	Maurice Dejean (1899–1982); Served at the time of the Battle of Dien Bien Phu	23 July 1953	4 June 1954	316 days
3	Paul Ély	Paul Ély (1897–1975)	4 June 1954	April 1955	9 months
4	Henri Hoppenot	Henri Hoppenot (1891–1977)	April 1955	21 July 1956	1 year, 3 months

== See also ==
- French Indochina
