= Martial Henri Merlin =

French colonial administrator (1860–1935)

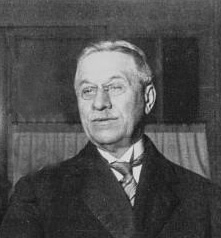

Governor-General of Guadeloupe
- In office 1901–1903
- President: Émile Loubet
- Preceded by: Joseph Pascal François
- Succeeded by: Paul Marie Armand de La Loyère

Governor-General of French West Africa
- In office 1907–1908
- President: Armand Fallières
- Preceded by: Ernest Roume
- Succeeded by: Amédée William Merlaud-Ponty

Governor-General of French Equatorial Africa
- In office 28 June 1908 – 15 May 1917
- President: Armand Fallières; Raymond Poincaré
- Preceded by: Alfred Albert Martineau
- Succeeded by: Gabriel Louis Angoulvant

Governor-General of French Madagascar
- In office 24 July 1917 – 1 August 1918
- President: Raymond Poincaré
- Preceded by: Hubert Auguste Garbit
- Succeeded by: Abraham Schrameck

Governor-General of French West Africa
- In office 16 September 1919 – 18 March 1923
- President: Raymond Poincaré; Paul Deschanel; Alexandre Millerand
- Preceded by: Charles Désiré Auguste Brunet, (acting)
- Succeeded by: Jules Carde

Governor-General of French Indochina
- In office 9 August 1923 – 23 April 1925
- President: Alexandre Millerand; Gaston Doumergue
- Preceded by: François Marius Baudouin (acting)
- Succeeded by: Maurice Monguillot

Personal details
- Born: 20 January 1860 Paris, France
- Died: 8 May 1935 (aged 75) Paris, France
- Occupation: Colonial administrator

Martial Henri Merlin (20 January 1860 – 8 May 1935; also Martial Merlin) was a French colonial administrator of the 19th and 20th centuries. He served as the governor-general of Guadeloupe (1901–1903), French West Africa (1907–1908 and 1919—1923), French Equatorial Africa (1908–1917), French Madagascar (1917–1918), and French Indochina (1923–1925).

== External links and sources ==
"Notice no. 19800035/31/3997". Base Léonore (in French).
