= Pierre-Olivier Lapie =

French lawyer, politician, writer and freedom fighter

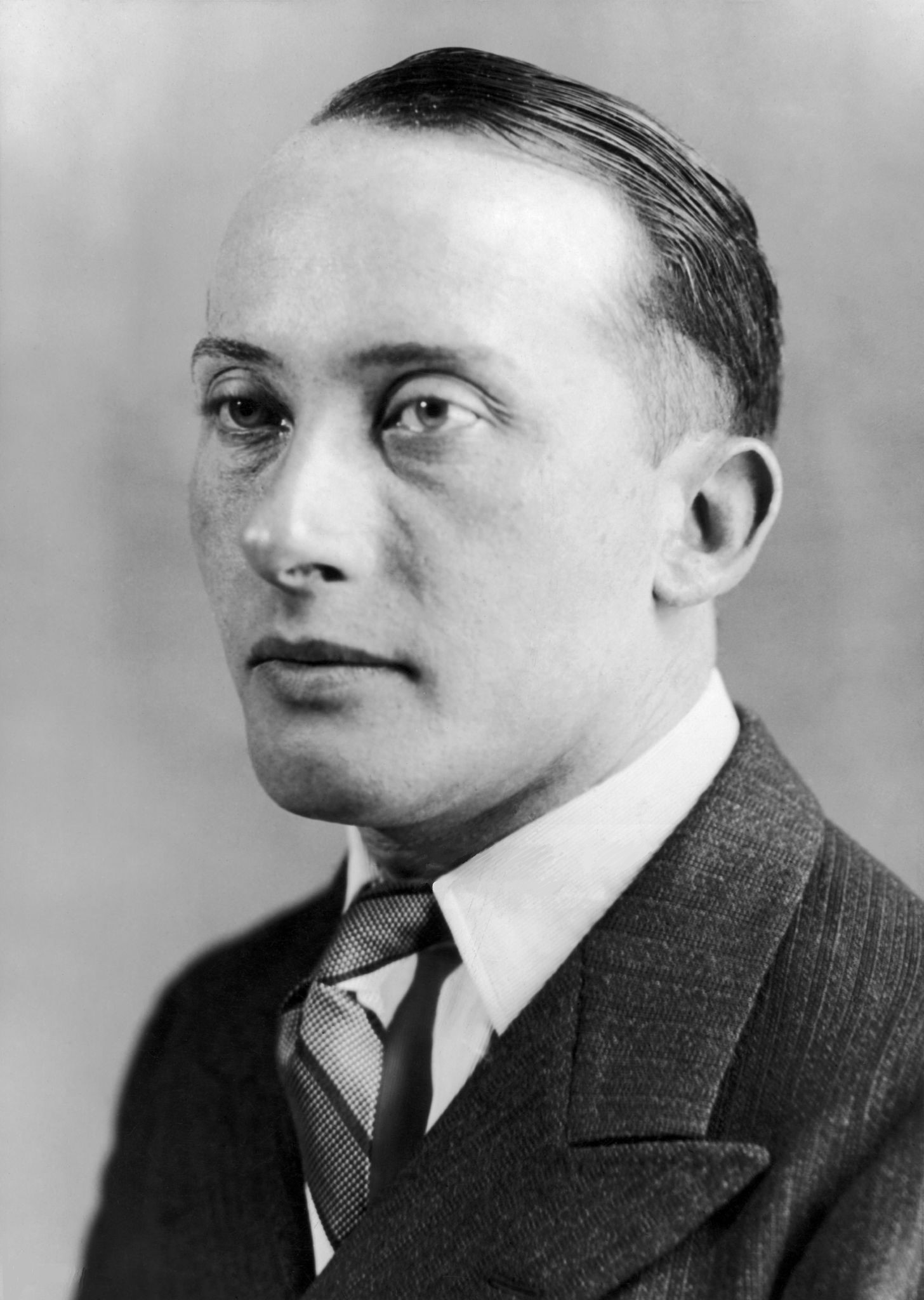
- Pierre-Olivier Lapie around 1936

Minister of National Education
- In office 12 July 1950 – 11 August 1951
- President: Vincent Auriol
- Prime Minister: René Pleven
- Preceded by: André Morice
- Succeeded by: André Marie

Personal details
- Born: 2 April 1901 Rennes, France
- Died: 10 March 1994 (aged 92) Paris, France
- Party: SFIO (1945–1958)
- Other political affiliations: Independent (Social Gaullism) (1959–1994)
- Education: Lycée Condorcet
- Alma mater: Sciences Po

Lapie's flag as Governor of Chad

Pierre-Olivier Lapie (French pronunciation: [pjɛʁ ɔlivje lapi]; 2 April 1901 – 10 March 1994) was a French lawyer, politician, writer, and freedom fighter.

== Biography ==
In 1936, Lapie was elected deputy under the Popular Front but was mobilized into service at the outbreak of World War II in 1939. He took part in the Norwegian campaign in February 1940 before joining Free France. He was then appointed Governor of Chad in November 1940, succeeding Félix Éboué. In 1942, he obtained a command in the 13th Demi-Brigade of the Foreign Legion and served in Tunisia and Libya. He was reassigned as a Liaison to Britain in January 1943 before being appointed to the Provisional Consultative Assembly based in Algiers from October 1943 to August 1945.

In September 1945, he was elected a deputy of Nancy to the First Constituent Assembly under the SFIO. In 1946, he was then reelected to the newly created National Assembly where he held several portfolios until an electoral defeat in 1958. He then aligned himself with the Social Gaullists and represented France on various European bodies.
