= Jean Marchessou =

French colonial administrator

Acting Governor-General of French Equatorial Africa
- In office 1927, 1934, 1935–1936

Governor of Moyen-Congo
- In office 1 December 1929 – 4 December 1930

Governor of New Caledonia Commissioner General in the Pacific High Commissioner to the New Hebrides
- In office 6 December 1936 – 11 July 1938

Personal details
- Born: 24 June 1879 Le Puy-en-Velay, France
- Died: 6 April 1964 (aged 84) Chamalières-sur-Loire, France
- Profession: Colonial administrator

Marcel Alix Jean Marchessou (24 June 1879 – 6 April 1964) was a French colonial administrator, spending over 30 years in Africa.

== Biography ==
Marchessou became the first Mayor of Bangui in 1912. He served as Acting Governor-General of French Equatorial Africa in 1927, before becoming Acting Governor of Moyen-Congo in December 1929, remaining in post for just over a year. He was Acting Governor-General of French Equatorial Africa again in September–October 1934, and again between March 1935 and April 1936. He was also briefly head of Dahomey in 1934.

In December 1936 he moved to New Caledonia to start a two-year term as Governor of New Caledonia, Commissioner General in the Pacific and High Commissioner to the New Hebrides. During his time in the Pacific he gained the nickname "Marche dessous" (walk underneath) due to his height of only 5'. After finishing his term, he returned to France.

Following World War II he was excluded from the Legion of Honour for his alleged role in court-martialing members of the French resistance in Riom during the Vichy regime.
