= Jules Marcel de Coppet =

French Colonial Administrator

Jules Marcel de Coppet (18 May 1881 in Paris – 31 August 1968 in Quiberville, France) was a French colonial administrator stationed in several countries in Africa before becoming governor-general of French West Africa.

He was also a significant figure in the French intellectual and literary life of his time, close to André Gide and especially Roger Martin du Gard, whose daughter he married.

== Biography ==
Coppet was governor of the colony of Dahomey from 1933 until 1934. From 7 May 1934 to 18 July 1935, he governed French Somaliland.

Succeeding Jules Brévié, he became governor-general of French West Africa on September 27, 1936, and retained the position until July 14, 1938. Upon his departure, Léon Geismar took over for a few months until the arrival of Pierre Boisson.

He also oversaw the creation of an encyclopedia devoted to Madagascar which was published in 1947.

== See also ==
- History of Benin
- List of colonial heads of Côte d'Ivoire
- List of colonial heads of French Sénégal
- List of colonial heads of Chad
- List of colonial governors of Dahomey
- List of colonial heads of Djibouti (French Somaliland)
- History of Madagascar

== Bibliography ==
- Hommes et destins : dictionnaire biographique d'Outre-mer (in French). Paris: Académie des sciences d'outre-mer. 1981. p. 144. ISBN 2-900098-03-3.
- Alain Couturier (2006). Le Gouverneur et son miroir. Marcel de Coppet (1881-1968) (in French). Paris: L'Harmattan. p. 202. ISBN 2-296-01823-8.
