= Jules Brévié =

French colonial administrator

Joseph-Jules Brévié
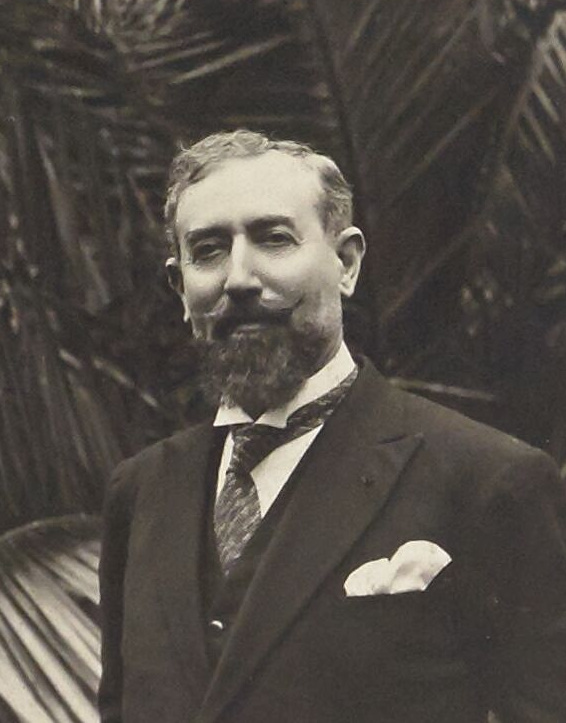
- Jules Brévié at the 7th North African Conference in Tunis, 1930

Commandant, then Lieutenant Governor of Niger
- In office 1921 – 9 October 1929
- Preceded by: Lucien Émile Rueff
- Succeeded by: Jean Baptiste Robert Fayout

Governor General of French West Africa
- In office 15 October 1930 – 27 September 1936
- President: Gaston Doumergue; Paul Doumer; Albert Lebrun
- Preceded by: Jules Carde
- Succeeded by: Jules Marcel de Coppet

Governor General of French Indochina
- In office 14 January 1937 – 20 August 1939
- President: Albert Lebrun
- Preceded by: Achille Louis Auguste Silvestre (acting)
- Succeeded by: Georges Catroux

Minister of Overseas France and the Colonies
- In office 18 April 1942 – 26 March 1943
- Prime Minister: Pierre Laval
- Preceded by: Charles Platon
- Succeeded by: Henri Bléhaut

Personal details
- Born: 12 March 1880 Bagnères-de-Luchon, Haute-Garonne, France
- Died: 28 July 1964 (aged 84) Pierrefitte, Cantal, France
- Occupation: Colonial administrator

Joseph-Jules Brévié (French pronunciation: [ʒozɛf ʒyl bʁevje]; 12 March 1880 – 28 July 1964) was a French colonial administrator who became governor-general of French West Africa from 1930 to 1936, and then governor-general of French Indochina from 1937 to 1939. He promoted liberal and humanistic policies, and thought it important to have deep understanding of the local people and respect for their civilization. He saw the role of the administration as being the economic and human development of the people. During World War II (1939–1945) he was Minister of Overseas France and the Colonies from April 1942 to March 1943. As a result of his participation in the Vichy government he was deprived of his rank and pension after the war.

== Life ==
=== Early years (1880–1930) ===
Joseph-Jules Brévié was born on 12 March 1880 in Bagnères-de-Luchon, Haute-Garonne. He graduated from the École coloniale (Colonial School) and was appointed a trainee administrator in 1902. He served in the Finance department of the government general at Dakar from January to April 1903. Brévié was involved in the occupation and organization of the colony of Upper Senegal and Niger. He served in Bamako, Niafunké and Bougouni in 1903–1906, 1907–1909 and 1910–1912. In 1904 Brévié discovered a site near Tondidarou in what is now Mali that contained a remarkable group of phalliform stone monuments.

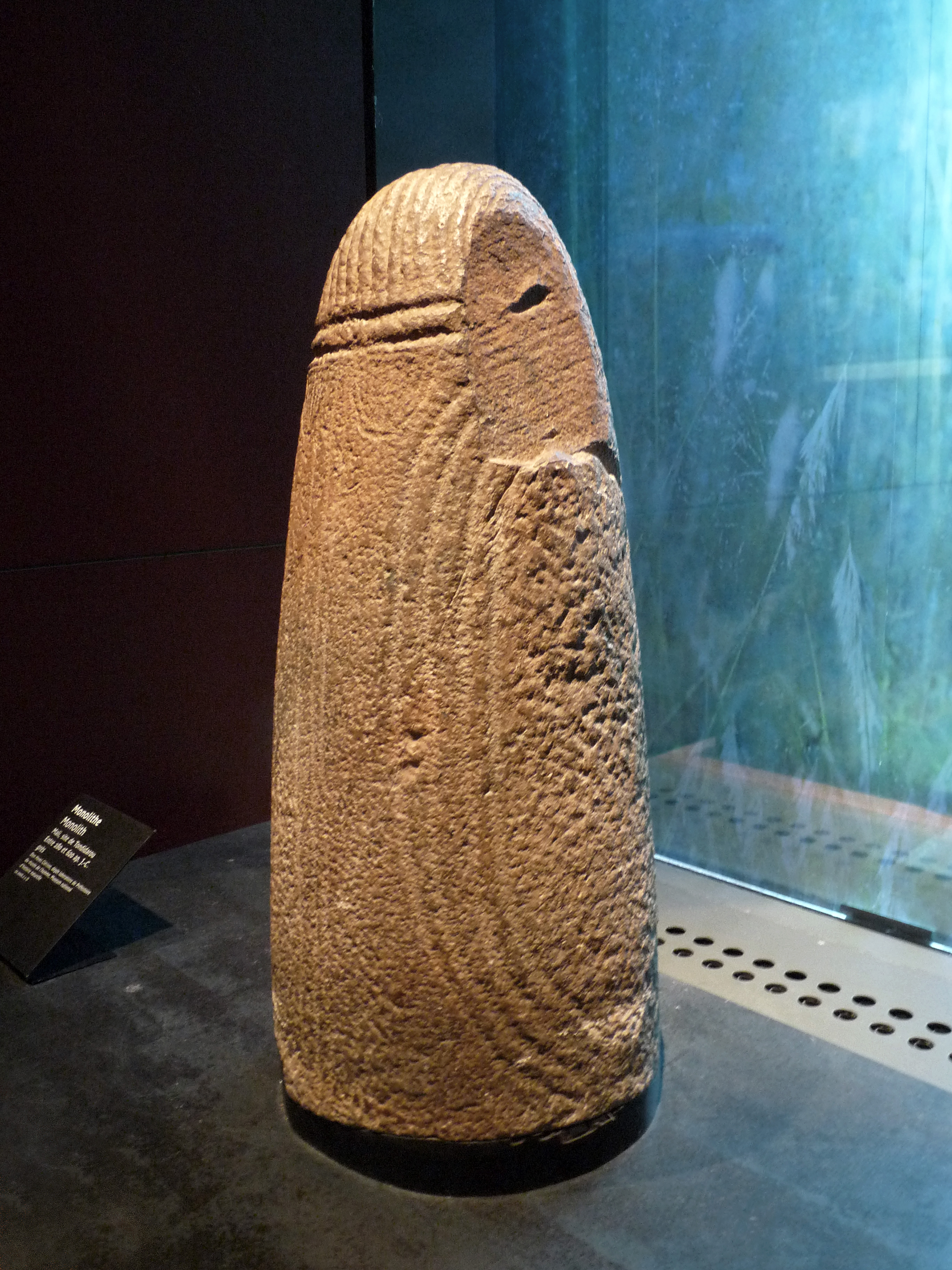
Monolith found by Brévié in Mali, now in the Musée du quai Branly

Brévié served in Guinea from 1913 to 1919. In November 1915 there was a revolt in the Black Volta bend against the French. Brévié arrived at the end of the month to review the situation. He was present at the battle of Yankasso on 23 December 1915 in which the French were checked. After a series of engagements, most of Burkina Faso was at peace by the end of July 1916.

In 1915 Brévié was visiting the village of Massantola in the Beledougou region of Mali when he heard a woman singing a lamentation she had composed in the Bamana language about her son, who had been killed in a rebellion against the French. In 1918 Brévié published the original and a translation with notes and commentary in Dakar as A propos d'une chanson bambara (About a Bambara Song). He explained that the rebellion had been led by two local chiefs after the imposition of direct rule by the French, which had decreased their power. After their defeat, they had retreated to a fort. The French lost many men before forcing their way in. One chief had killed himself and his followers while the other had escaped in the hope of fighting again. Brévié explained that the local people saw the affairs as a tragedy while the French saw it as a victory.

After World War I (1914–18) Brévié was in charge of the economy in Guinea. In 1920 he joined the Office of Political Affairs in Dakar. He served in Niger in 1920–1923, 1925–1927 and 1928–29. He was lieutenant governor of Niger from 1922 to 1929. He followed Maurice Delafosse in his hostility to Islam as a disruptive force and in support for traditional authority, a position he explained in his 1923 book L'Islamisme contre 'Naturisme'.

=== Governor of French West Africa (1930–1936) ===
Brévié was governor-general of French West Africa (Afrique occidentale française, AOF) from 15 October 1930 to 27 September 1936. As governor of AOF, he promoted scientific and humanist administrative policies. He felt that a successful native policy required detailed understanding of the local people. He saw the value of indigenous religious practices when compared to the imported Islamic religion. He believed that French colonial policy should try to preserve the essentially collectivist character of African civilizations.

As soon as he took office Brévié announced that the phase of exploration and conquest was ended, and a new phase was starting in which economic and human development would be the main concerns. He told the colonial governors, "it is not in offices and through intermediaries that we exercise our control over the indigenous milieu ... it is by making ourselves seen and heard, by tirelessly circulating ... always in movement ... constant, thoughtful and always attentive. ... It is not sufficient to be strong and just; we must also know how to bring, in our relations with natives, untiring kindness, concern at all times, and well-informed indulgence." In 1935 Brévié sent a circular to the West African administrators asking them to collect oral material, verbal art, since that would help them better understand the people of the colonies.

Brévié wrote, "colonization is becoming a question of method, of calculation, or predictions and, we should say, of science, It remains without a doubt and first of all a political and psychological art, but one that must be guided and clarified by exact scientific data.". Brévié wanted a methodical research program into colonial history and African culture and lobbied for an official scientific institute to undertake geographical, ethnographic and historical research. He wrote that "colonization needs scholars, impartial and disinterested researchers with broad vision, outside of the urgency and fire of action. After much planning and preparation the Institut Français d'Afrique Noire (French Institute of Black Africa) was established in 1938 in Dakar.

Brévié took office at the start of the Great Depression and a slump in the local economy. He partly blamed colonial capitalists for the problems and obtained large loans from the French government to support African producers. However, by 1932 the value of export crops was dropping despite increased yields, and Africans were starting to return to food crops. Brévié responded by measures such as reducing rail tariffs, subsidizing the movement of laborers in Senegal, creating foods banks and programs to increase agricultural productivity. An inquiry found that the results did not justify the costs. Brévié promoted public works, health and education in the belief that the colonial subjects must see "proof that the whole colonial enterprise works to make him happier." He was concerned that the drop in living standards would cause the people to lose confidence in French rule and to be vulnerable to communist propaganda.

The status of people of mixed blood was an issue. In 1934 Brévié wrote to the governor-general of French Indochina asking him for information on "what has been done in Indochina to assist and educate children of mixed blood ... any information you are willing to share will serve as an inspiration." In 1935 Brévié issued a circular of the status of African Christians. He said that the moral development of the "natives" would benefit from conversion to Christianity, and they must be give freedom to convert. However, a minor could not be baptized without the consent of the head of the family. Christian Africans must not become marginalized. The legal status of the convert was awkward. They could not be judged under traditional local law, which they had rejected, nor under European law since they were not citizens. Brévié proposed a compromise law that would reconcile Catholic principles with local customs.

=== Governor of French Indochina (1936–1939) ===
Brévié was appointed governor-general of French Indochina in 1936 by the Popular Front government led by Léon Blum. He replaced René Robin as governor general. While Brévié was being received in a ceremony at the landing stage in Saigon in January 1937 the colonial police were engaged nearby in a violent clash with several thousand communist workers from Saigon and the vicinity. When Brévié arrived in Hanoi there was a ban on processions and banners. Brévié was liberal-minded, and tried to defuse an extremely tense political situation by making concessions such as granting amnesties to political prisoners, giving greater freedom to the press and removing restrictions on nationalist political parties. Brévié, a socialist, made concessions to the trade unions in Saigon.

In late August 1937 there were floods that ruined the rice harvest in Cochinchina and Cambodia. China contributed $50,000 Shanghai dollars for relief, which Brévié called "a gesture of great humanity." Brévié's administration stepped up public works projects and took measures to provide rice for replanting and to build up seed stocks. The motive in part was to stave off anti-colonial discontent. In 1937 Brévié spoke at the inauguration of the Do Luong barrage in Nghệ An Province, which was also attended by the emperor Bảo Đại. He noted that the barrage enabled irrigation in a "particularly disadvantaged" area that had been the "theater of serious and prolonged troubles in 1930." In 1938 Brévié announced plans to build the capacity to irrigate 500,000 hectares (1,200,000 acres) in the Red River Delta to boost rice production. The plan would use modern technology to create food security and would maintain political control.

Missionaries found that Brévié treated them sympathetically. In 1938 Brévié called a meeting on the métis question attended by the head of the military, the heads of the departments of schools, law, health, welfare and economics, and the president of the Société d'assistance aux enfants franco-indochinois. The group decided to expand the framework that charities had established, to increase their budgets and provide administrative support. Efforts would be made to find children of mixed blood, who would be accommodated by the charities, or given to nuns to raise until they were 5 years old, particularly to the Sisters of Saint Paul of Chartres. The Jules Brévié Federation was founded in July 1939. The Federation distributed financing and directed efforts to handle issues concerning the métis. It coordinated charities, both secular and religious, that provided "education and placement of children of mixed Franco-Indochinese blood."

The hill station of Da Lat had boarding schools that served all of Vietnam. It had been seen as a possible center of government that would be hygienic and segregated between Europeans and Vietnamese. However, the proliferation of the Vietnamese elite in the town made it increasingly impracticable to practice segregation. When Brévié visited Da Lat he told a racially mixed set of students at the Lycée Yersin on 12 July 1938,

At points on the globe where there is contact between different races an incredible effervescence is developing. We must prevent this from degenerating into chronic disorder; we must re-establish the harmony essential for the well-being of men and the progress of societies in all aspects. This is the role vested in you, by the very fact of your presence in a place where these transformations are occurring.

Brévié came into conflict with Admiral Victor Petit, who commanded the navy in Indochina, over occupation of the Paracel Islands. The islands would provide protection to the peninsula, but the navy refused to occupy them. Brévié had to buy some old merchant vessels for the task. In 1939 Brévié's administration defined the "Brévié Line", which defined the border between the waters of Cambodia and Cochin China. This was the subject of post-colonial disputes between Vietnam and Cambodia. The reform program he instituted came to a halt when the Popular Front left office in France, followed by the start of World War II. Brévié was succeeded by Georges Catroux (1877–1969) in August 1939. Brévié wrote the prefaces to two charming books by Tran Van Tung, Sourvenirs d'un enfant de campagne (1939) and Rêves d'un campagnard annamite (1940). (Note: Tran Van Tung received the Prix Verrière from the Académie française for his 1941 Rêves d'un campagnard annamite. In 1952 the Académie française awarded him the Prix Lange for his Le Viet-Nam et sa civilisation.)

=== Later career (1939–1964) ===
Brévié was retired by decree on 13 March 1940. In 1941 he chaired the group of colonial professionals while serving as a member of the constitutional committee of the National Council. He was elected a member of the Academy of Colonial Sciences on 19 December 1941. The Vichy government appointed him Minister of Overseas France and the Colonies when Pierre Laval became prime minister in April 1942. He held office from 18 April 1942 to 26 March 1943, replacing Charles Platon. As minister he set up the Colonial Scientific Research Office to further develop his concept of scientific colonization. The former minister Henry Lémery proposed to Laval in August 1942 that the French West Indies should have a Conseil Local and that Guadeloupe and Martinique should be made standard departments of France. Laval and Brévié accepted the first proposal but rejected the second, creating an administrative anomaly.

Brévié was stripped of his honorary rank of governor-general of colonies in January 1945. In March 1945 he was permanently deprived of his pension and of the right to wear any French or foreign decoration. Jules Brévié died at the age of 84 on 28 July 1964 in the village of Pierrefitte near Talizat, Cantal. As of 2012 a street in the administrative quarter of Niamey still bore his name.

== Publications ==
- Jules Brévié (1917). "A propos d'une chanson bambara". Annuaire du Comité d'Études Historiques et Scientifiques de l'Afrique Occidentale Française (in French). Gorée: Imprimierie du Gouvernment Géneral: 217–222.
- Jules Brévié; Maurice Delafosse (preface) (1923). Islamisme contre 'Naturisme' au Soudan français. Essai de psychologie politique, coloniale (in French). Paris: Ernest Leroux. p. 320.
- Gustave Daumas; Jules Brévié (preface); Cardinal Verdier (introduction) (1936). Le Sourire de la France en Afrique noire (in French). Impr. S.I.L.I.C.
- Jules Brévié (1936). Trois études. Gorée, Impr. du gouvernement. p. 43.
- Bui-Dinh San; Jules Brévié (preface) (1938). Histoire de Viêt-Nam. Hanoï, Haiphong, Saïgon, Mai-Linh. p. 238.
- Trâ`n-Van-Tùng; Jules Brévié (preface) (1939). Souvenirs d'un enfant de campagne. Hanoï: G. Taupin. p. 281.
- Trâ`n-Van-Tùng; Jules Brévié (preface) (1940). Rêves d'un campagnard annamite. Hanoï. p. 281.

== Sources ==
Media related to Jules Brévié at Wikimedia Commons

- Barbier, Colette; Hoppenot, Henri (1999). Henri Hoppenot (25 octobre 1891-10 août 1977): diplomate (in French). Peter Lang. ISBN 978-2-11-089154-9.
- "BRÉVIÉ Jules" (in French). Académie des sciences d'outre-mer.
- Corfield, Justin (2014-11-01). Historical Dictionary of Ho Chi Minh City. Anthem Press. ISBN 978-1-78308-333-6.
- Garcia, Luc (2008-02-01). Quand les missionnaires rencontraient les Vietnamiens (1920–1960) (in French). KARTHALA Editions. ISBN 978-2-8111-4247-6.
- Ginio, Ruth (2006-12-01). French Colonialism Unmasked: The Vichy Years in French West Africa. U of Nebraska Press. ISBN 0-8032-5380-X.
- Gunn, Geoffrey C. (2014-02-21). Rice Wars in Colonial Vietnam: The Great Famine and the Viet Minh Road to Power. Rowman & Littlefield Publishers. ISBN 978-1-4422-2303-5.
- Hale, Thomas A.; Sidikou, Aissata G. (2013-12-02). Women's Songs from West Africa. Indiana University Press. ISBN 978-0-253-01021-6.
- Idrissa, Abdourahmane; Decalo, Samuel (2012-06-01). Historical Dictionary of Niger. Scarecrow Press. ISBN 978-0-8108-6094-0.
- Jennings, Eric T. (2004-01-01). Vichy in the Tropics: Petain's National Revolution in Madagascar, Guadeloupe, and Indochina, 1940–44. Stanford University Press. ISBN 978-0-8047-5047-9.
- Ken Knabb; Ngo Van (2011-04-01). In the Crossfire: Adventures of a Vietnamese Revolutionary. ReadHowYouWant.com. ISBN 978-1-4596-1735-3.
- Lockhart, Bruce McFarland; Duiker, William J. (2010). The A to Z of Vietnam. Rowman & Littlefield. ISBN 978-0-8108-7646-0.
- Peckham, Robert; Pomfret, David M. (2013-01-01). Imperial Contagions: Medicine, Hygiene, and Cultures of Planning in Asia. Hong Kong University Press. ISBN 978-988-8139-12-5.
- Peterson, Brian James (2011-01-01). Islamization from Below: The Making of Muslim Communities in Rural French Sudan, 1880-1960. Yale University Press. ISBN 978-0-300-15273-9.
- Pettibone, Charles D. (2010). The Organization and Order of Battle of Militaries in World War II. Trafford Publishing. ISBN 978-1-4269-4633-2.
- Raimbault, Michel; Sanogo, Kléna (1991). Recherches archéologiques au Mali : prospections et inventaire, fouilles et études analytiques en zone lacustre (in French). Paris: Karthala. ISBN 9782865372850.
- Rupley, Lawrence; Bangali, Lamissa; Diamitani, Boureima (2013). Historical Dictionary of Burkina Faso. Rowman & Littlefield. ISBN 978-0-8108-6770-3.
- Saada, Emmanuelle; Goldhammer, Arthur (2012-03-02). Empire's Children: Race, Filiation, and Citizenship in the French Colonies. University of Chicago Press. ISBN 978-0-226-73307-4.
- Salifou, André (2002-11-01). Le Niger (in French). Editions L'Harmattan. ISBN 978-2-296-29156-0.
- "TRAN-VAN-TUNG" (in French). Académie française.
- Van Quang Pham (2013-10-24). L'Institution de la littérature vietnamienne francophone (in French). Editions Publibook. ISBN 978-2-342-01415-0.
- Wilder, Gary (2005-12-01). The French Imperial Nation-State: Negritude and Colonial Humanism Between the Two World Wars. University of Chicago Press. ISBN 978-0-226-89768-4.
