= Jules Carde =

French colonial administrator

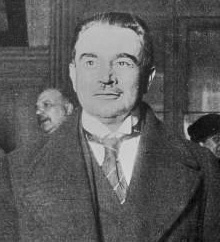
- Jules Carde. Press photograph taken at the gare d'Orsay in 1923

Governor General of French West Africa
- In office 18 March 1923 – 15 October 1930
- Preceded by: Martial Henri Merlin
- Succeeded by: Jules Brévié

Governor General of Algeria
- In office 3 October 1930 – 21 September 1935
- Preceded by: Pierre-Louis Bordes
- Succeeded by: Georges le Beau

Personal details
- Born: Jules Gaston Henri Carde; 3 June 1874 Batna, Algeria
- Died: 10 July 1949 (aged 75)
- Occupation: Colonial administrator
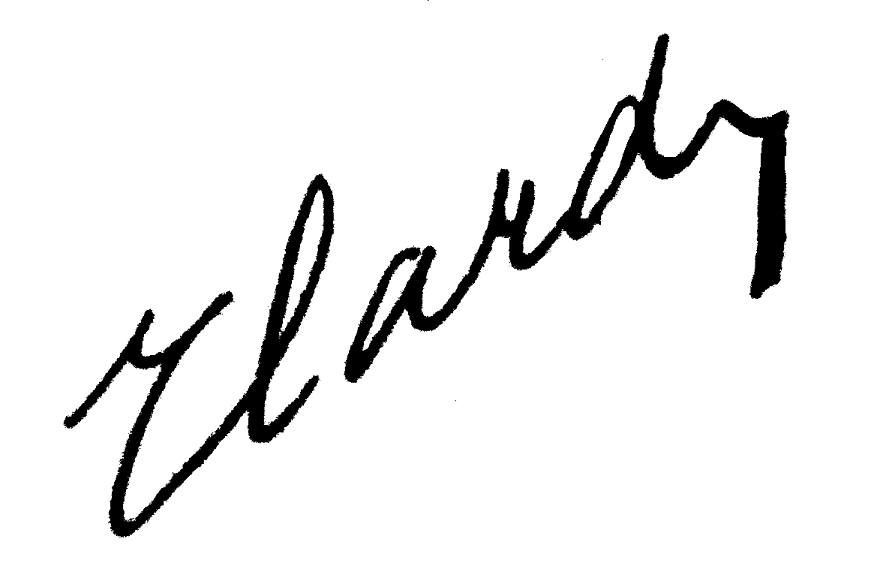
- Signature

Jules Gaston Henri Carde (3 June 1874 – 10 July 1949) was a French colonial administrator who served as Governor General of French West Africa and then Governor General of Algeria.

== Life ==
Jules Gaston Henri Carde was born in Batna, Algeria on 3 June 1874. He joined the colonial administration under Joseph Gallieni in Madagascar, where he remained for seven years until 1907. He was then Chief of Staff to the Governor of Martinique, secretary general of the Ivory Coast, Chief of Staff of the Governor General of French Equatorial Africa (AEF), lieutenant governor of French Congo and General Secretary of the Governor of French West Africa (AOF). From 1919 to 1923 he was the first Commissioner of the French Republic in Cameroon, whose status changed during this period.

Succeeding Martial Merlin, Jules Carde was appointed governor-general of French West Africa on 18 March 1923, a position he held until 15 October 1930. Shortly after installation, on 11 November 1923, he laid the first stone of the Dakar Cathedral. The ceremony was attended by Blaise Diagne, then deputy for Senegal. Carde was particularly interested in economic development, public health and education. Under his authority, public education was reorganized in the AOF, by the decree of 1 May 1924. Jules Brévié was his successor as head of the AOF. On 3 October 1930 Carde was appointed civilian governor-general of Algeria, a position he held until 21 September 1935.

Jules Carde died on 10 July 1949. He was buried in the Alphonse Karr cemetery in Saint-Raphaël, Var. He was an officer of the Legion of Honour.

== Bibliography ==
- Principales réformes réalisées et mesures adoptées, 1920, 75 p.
- « La réorganisation de l'enseignement en Afrique occidentale française », Revue indigène, May–June 1924, n° 185-186, p. 111-129
- Magasins généraux de la santé publique : notice n° 5, 1933
- Instructions d'ordre général relatives au fonctionnement de l'assistance médicale : notice n° 3, 1933
- L'Afrique Occidentale française, Vie Technique, Paris, 1926, 130 p.
- Exposé de la situation générale de l'Algérie en 1934, Solal, 1935
- « La colonisation indigène dans la vallée du Niger », Le Monde colonial illustré, Paris, 17e year, n° 189, March 1939

== Memorials ==
The African School of Medicine and Pharmacy, founded in 1916 in Dakar, at first was named after him. Today his memory is perpetuated by the Boulevard Carde in Abidjan, the seat of the Constitutional Council of Côte d'Ivoire .
