= List of colonial governors of Chad =

(Dates in italics indicate de facto continuation of office)

Tenure	Incumbent	Notes
French Suzerainty
5 September 1900 to 10 October 1900	Émile Gentil, Commandant	
Under the lieutenant governors of Oubangui-Chari
10 October 1900 to 1901	Georges Destenave, Commandant	
1901 to 1901	... Julien, Commandant	
1902 to 1904	Victor Emmanuel Étienne Largeau, Commandant	1st Term
1904 to 1906	Henri Gouraud, Commandant	
1906 to 1908	Victor Emmanuel Étienne Largeau, Commandant	2nd Term
1908 to 1909	Constant Millot, Commandant	
6 October 1909 to 15 January 1910	Henry Moll, Commandant	
Incorporated into French Equatorial Africa
15 January 1910 to 1910	Henry Moll, Commandant	
1910 to 1911	Joseph Édouard Maillard, Commandant	
1911 to 1912	Victor Emmanuel Étienne Largeau, Commandant	3rd Term
1912 to 1912	James Édouard Hirtzman, Commandant	
1912 to 1913	Gabriel Julien Joseph Briand, Commandant	1st Term
1913 to 1915	Victor Emmanuel Étienne Largeau, Commandant	4th Term
1915 to 1916	Gabriel Julien Joseph Briand, Commandant	2nd Term
1916 to 1918	Clément Léon Martelly, Commandant	
1918 to 17 March 1920	Albert Ducarré, Commandant	
10 August 1920 to 30 January 1923	Fernand Marie Joseph Antoine Lavit, Lieutenant-Governor	
30 January 1923 to 1925	François Reste, acting Lieutenant-Governor	1st Term
1925 to 1925	Antoine Touzet, Lieutenant-Governor	
9 April 1925 to 25 January 1926	François Reste, Lieutenant-Governor	2nd Term
25 January 1926 to 13 January 1928	Marcel de Coppet, acting Lieutenant-Governor	1st Term
13 January 1928 to 21 April 1929	Adolphe Deitte, Lieutenant-Governor	1st Term
21 April 1929 to 22 November 1929	Émile Buhot-Launay, acting Lieutenant-Governor	1st Term
22 November 1929 to 14 May 1932	Marcel de Coppet, Lieutenant-Governor	2nd Term
14 May 1932 to 26 January 1933	Georges David Pierre Marie Prouteaux, acting Governor-Delegate	
26 January 1933 to 17 August 1934	Richard Brunot, Governor-Delegate	1st Term
17 August 1934 to 21 May 1935	Adolphe Deitte, Governor-Delegate	2nd Term
21 May 1935 to 30 May 1935	Richard Brunot, Governor-Delegate	2nd Term
30 May 1935 to 23 October 1936	Pierre Simon Antonin Bonnefont, acting Governor-Delegate	
23 October 1936 to 24 October 1936	Émile Buhot-Launay, acting Governor-Delegate	2nd Term
24 October 1936 to 28 March 1938	Max de Masson de Saint-Félix, Governor-Delegate	
28 March 1938 to 1939	Émile Buhot-Launay, acting Governor-Delegate	3rd Term
1939 to 19 November 1938	Émile Buhot-Launay, acting Governor	
19 November 1938 to 12 November 1940	Félix Éboué, Governor	
12 November 1940 to 30 July 1942	Pierre-Olivier Lapie, Governor	
30 July 1942 to 5 November 1943	André Latrille, Governor	
5 November 1943 to 27 October 1946	Jacques Rogué, Governor	
French overseas territory
27 October 1946 to 24 November 1948	Jacques Rogué, Governor	
24 November 1948 to 7 July 1949	Paul Le Layec, Governor	
7 July 1949 to 27 January 1951	Henry de Mauduit, Governor	
27 January 1951 to 19 October 1951	Charles Hanin, acting Governor	
19 October 1951 to 19 December 1951	François Casamatta, acting Governor	
19 December 1951 to 3 November 1956	Ignace Colombani, Governor	
3 November 1956 to 22 January 1959	René Troadec, Governor	
Republic of Chad	Autonomous	
22 January 1959 to 11 August 1960	Daniel Doustin, High Commissioner	
11 August 1960	Independence as Republic of Chad	

For continuation after independence, see: President of Chad

== See also ==
- Chad
  - Heads of state of Chad
  - Heads of government of Chad
- Lists of office-holders
