= La Montagne (newspaper) =

Regional daily newspaper published in France

- Type: Regional daily newspaper
- Format: Tabloid
- Owner: Centre France group
- Founder: Alexandre Varenne
- Founded: 1919; 106 years ago
- Political alignment: Socialist
- Language: French
- Headquarters: Clermont-Ferrand
- Country: France
- Circulation: 140,752 (as of 2020)
- ISSN: 0767-4007
- OCLC number: 474205368
- Website: La Montagne

La Montagne (French pronunciation: [la mɔ̃taɲ]) is a French language regional daily newspaper based in Clermont-Ferrand, France. The title was selected to reflect its alignment with the ideas of the Montagnards of the French Revolution. The paper has been in circulation since 1919.

== History and profile ==
La Montagne was established as an independent socialist publication by Alexandre Varenne in 1919. He also served as the editor-in-chief of the paper which is headquartered in Clermont-Ferrand.

La Montagne was censored during World War II when France was occupied by the German forces, and the paper was suspended on 27 August 1943. It was relaunched on 15 September 1944 and became the main daily in Auvergne.

The Centre France group is the owner of La Montagne, which also owns other regional dailies and weeklies. The majority shareholder in the company is the Alexander and Margaret Varenne Foundation. La Montagne began to be published in tabloid format in January 2008.

== Circulation ==
La Montagne sold 246,900 copies in 1990 and 224,000 copies in 1991. The paper sold 209,000 copies in 2000. The circulation of the paper rose to 211,941 copies in 2001 and had a readership of 632,000 the same year. La Montagne sold 206,813 copies in 2002. The paper had a circulation of 204,000 copies during the first quarter of 2006. In the period of 2007-2008 its circulation was 191,000 copies.

Year	2009	2010	2011	2012	2013	2014	2016	2017	2018	2019	2020
Circulation	197,424	196,108	191,927	186,233	182,600	179,862	168,759	165,390	157,392	145,385	147,735

== See also ==
- List of newspapers in France
