= Léon Geismar =

French colonial administrator (1895–1944)

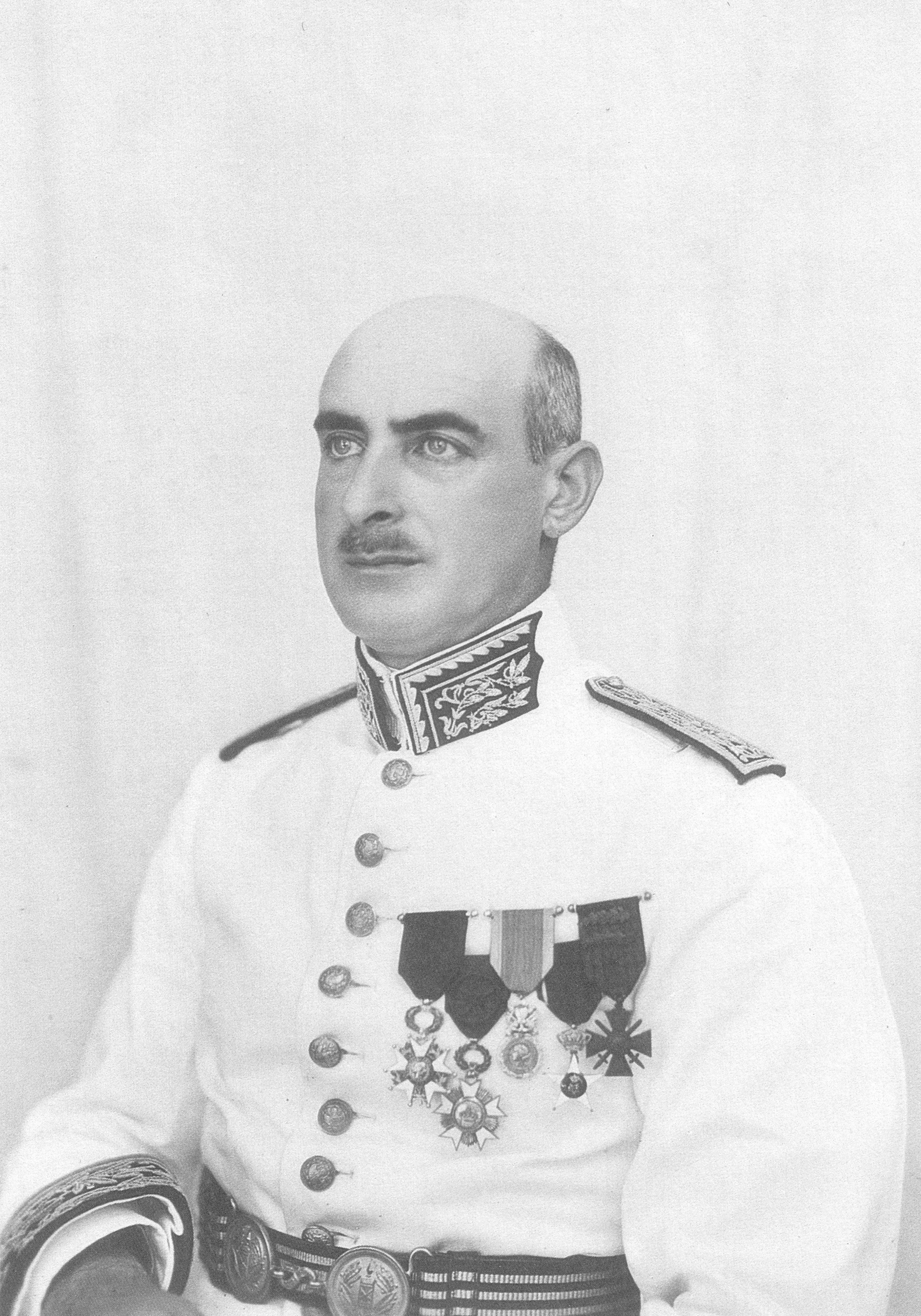

Governor-General of French West Africa
- Preceding: Jules Marcel de Coppet
- Succeeded by: Pierre François Boisson

Personal details
- Born: 15 July 1895 Alsace, German Empire
- Died: 11 May 1944 (aged 48) Casablanca, French Morocco
- Awards: Legion of Honour

Léon Geismar (1895–1944) was a French politician and colonial governor of French West Africa.

== Early life ==
He was born in Alsace to a pious Jewish family. His father was a winemaker, and his ancestors included General Gédéon Geismar.

== Life and career ==
He initially served for the German army in World War One, but deserted to France in September 1914. He received several awards for his actions during the war, including the Escapees' Medal and the Volunteer Combatant's Cross.

After the war ended, Geismar studied for university and then moved to Dakar shortly after. His importance eventually grew to the point where he became Governor General of French West Africa. He received several honours during his time in Africa, including the Black Star, Dragon of Annam, and finally a Knight of the Legion of Honour, the highest order of merit in France.

Under the Vichy regime, Geismar was subjected to extreme persecution, and told by authorities that he would have to give up all his posts within a month. He was then demoted from Governor general to Treasurer for Ivory Coast.

== Personal life ==
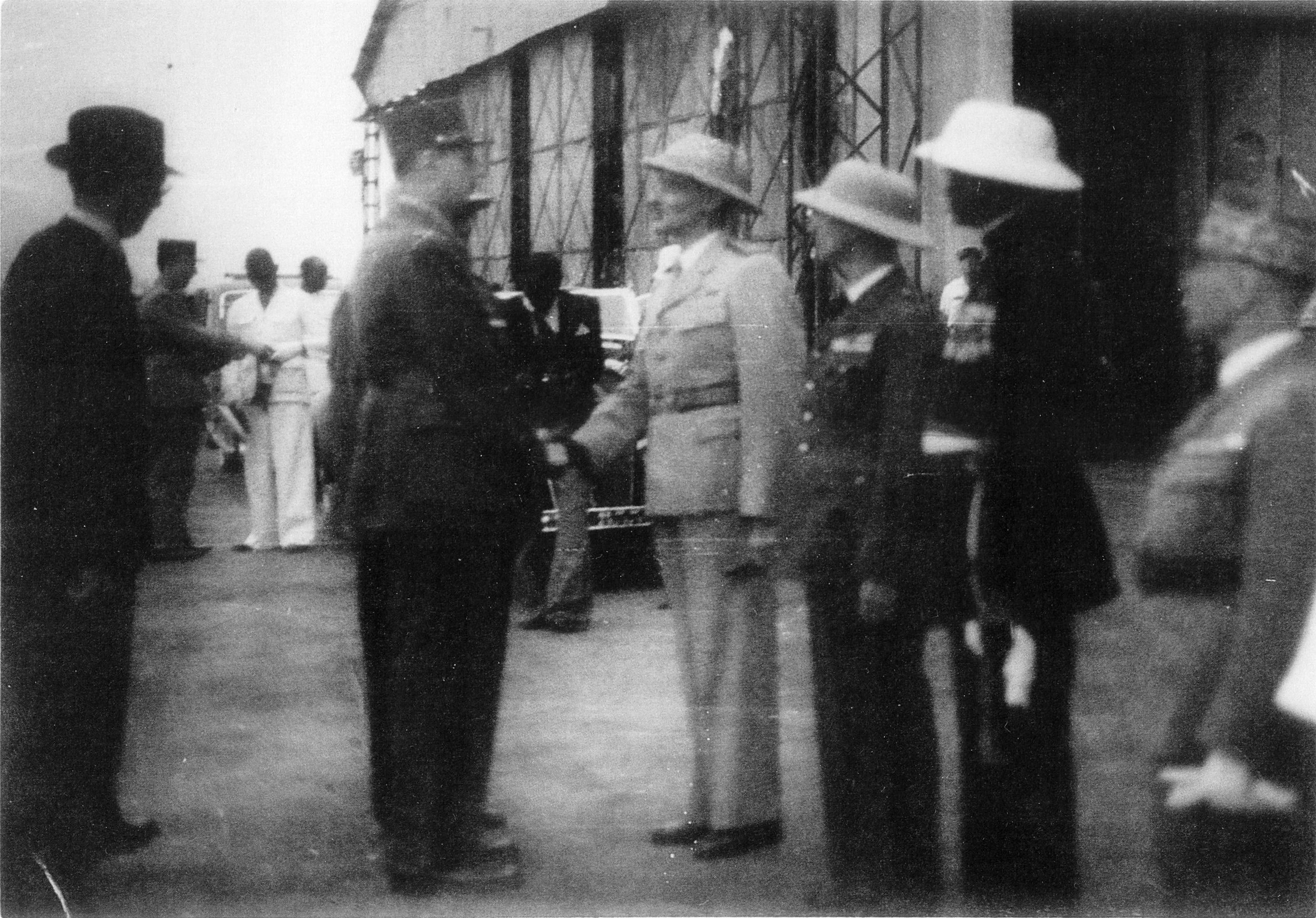
Geismar with General Gaulle in Dakar.

He was married to a Malagasy Catholic, Marguerite Mouneyres, a descendant of Ranavalo III, and had one daughter. Geismar converted to Catholicism after marriage, but was still treated as a Jew by Vichy authorities. Geismar was fluent in six languages (including French, German, Hausa, and English) and had at least some knowledge of Italian, Portuguese, and Dutch.

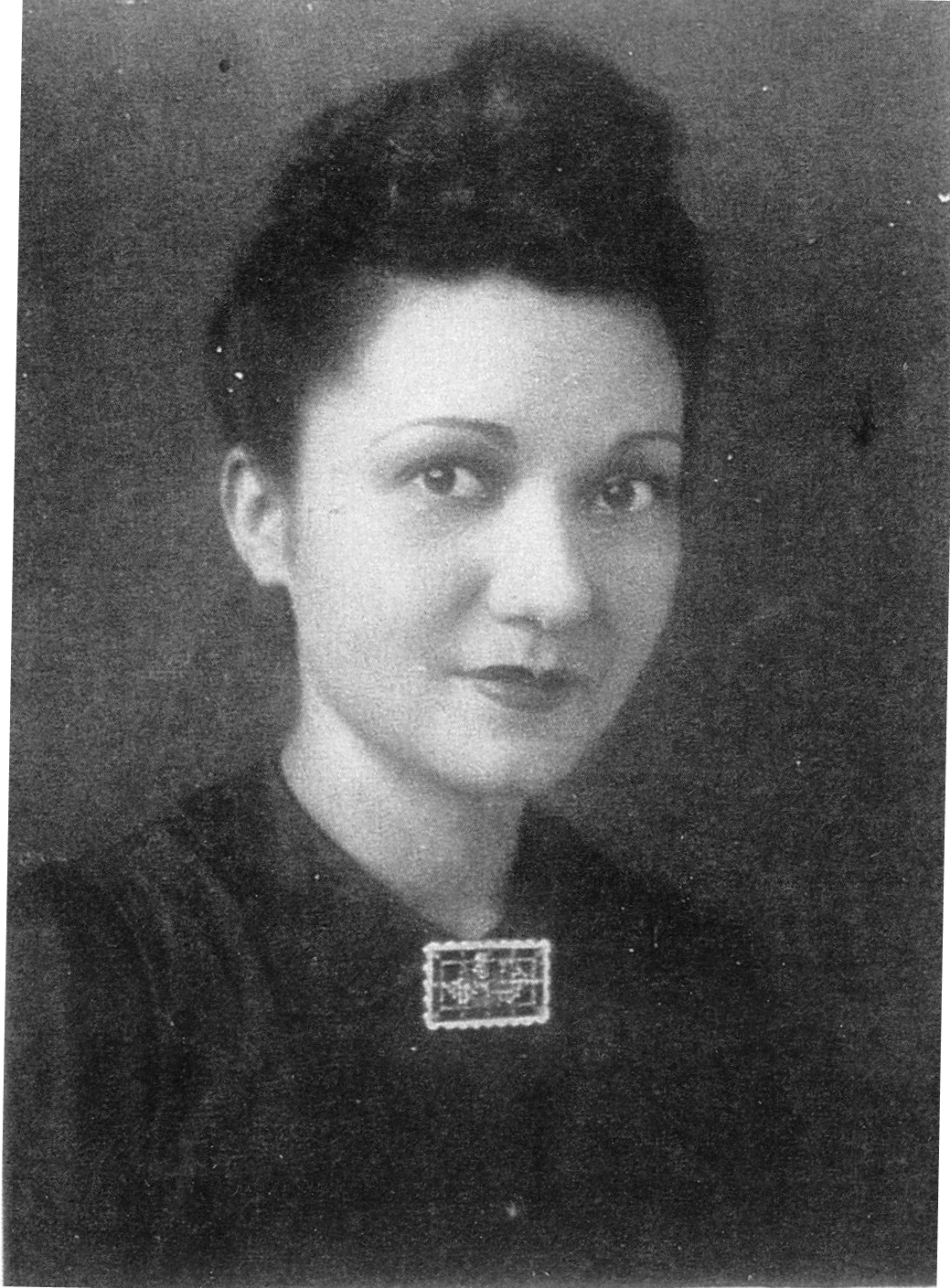
Geismar's wife Marguerite.

Geismar's views on the Zionist movement remain unclear, however, in 1940 he expressed doubt in a letter to his Zionist sister that a Jewish state would be possible given that the Middle East had "become an Arab state". Besides this letter, there are no other records of Geismar stating his opinion on Zionism again.

== Works ==
- Recueil des coutumes civiles des races du Sénégal : établi par L. Geismar ...
- Rapport général sur l'artisanat indigène : congrès international et intercolonial de la Société indigène, 5 au 10 octobre : Exposition coloniale internationale de Paris, 1931
- Rapport général sur la protection de la vie locale : congrès international et intercolonial de la Société indigène, 5 au 10 octobre : Exposition coloniale internationale de Paris, 1931

== See also ==
- History of the Jews in Africa
