= Maurice Long (politician) =

French politician

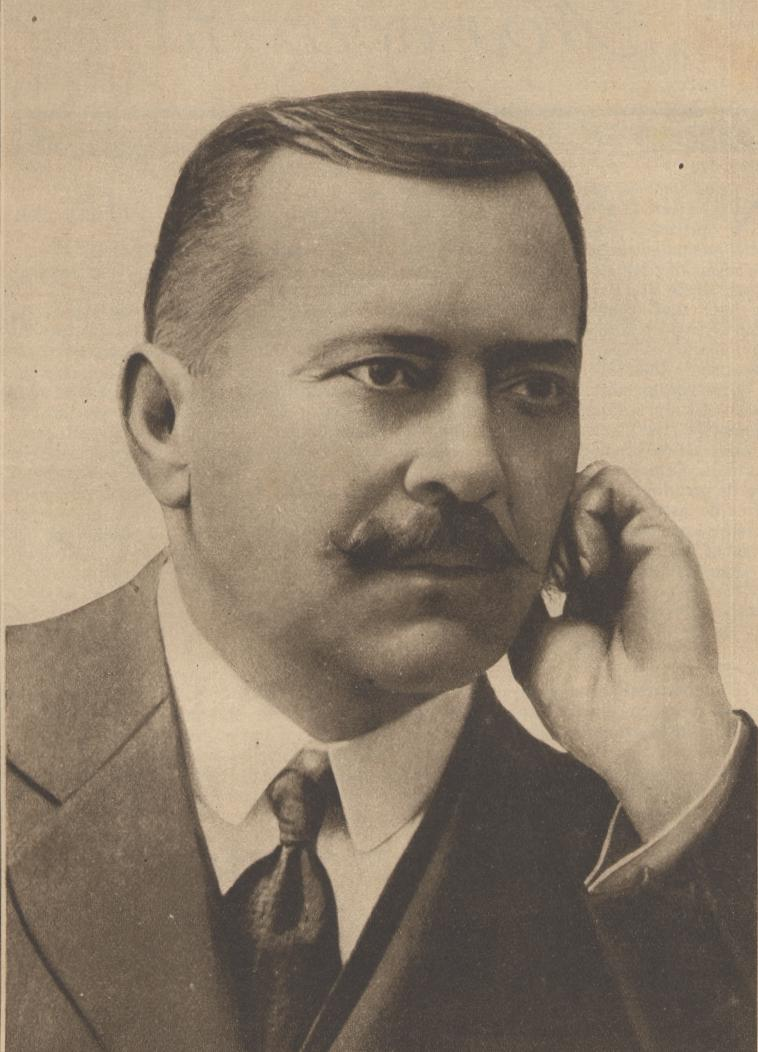

Member of the Chamber of Deputies for Drôme
- In office 8 May 1910 – 15 January 1923

Minister of Supply
- In office September 12, 1917 – 17 November 1917
- President: Paul Painlevé

Governor-General of French Indochina
- In office 10 December 1919 – 15 January 1923
- President: Raymond Poincaré; Paul Deschanel; Alexandre Millerand
- Preceded by: Maurice Antoine François Monguillot
- Succeeded by: Joseph Maurice Le Gallen

Personal details
- Born: 15 March 1866 Crest, France
- Died: 15 January 1923 (aged 56) Colombo, Ceylon

Maurice Long (15 March 1866 – 15 January 1923) was a French politician. A député for Drôme, he was briefly a Minister of Supply under the government of Paul Painlevé in 1917 and the Governor-General of French Indochina from 10 December 1919 until his death.

== Biography ==
Maurice Long was born on 15 March 1866 in Crest, Drôme. From 8 May 1910 until his death, he represented his home department in the Chamber of Deputies as a member of the Radical-Socialist Party. During World War I, Long was the Minister of Supply for the cabinet of Paul Painlevé from 12 September to 17 November 1917. On 10 December 1919, Long was appointed Governor-General of French Indochina, a position he held until his death.

=== Death and legacy ===
At the age of 57, Maurice Long died in Colombo, Ceylon on 15 January 1923 while returning to Indochina after a stay in France.

The Musée Maurice Long, a former commercial and industrial museum in Hanoi, was named after the late Governor-General. On 1 May 1938, at the museum, "a meeting of many thousands of Hanoi workers demanded 'freedom, democracy, the right to organise trade unions, the improvement of the quality of life', a key event in the build-up to the First Indochina War against the French."

== See also ==
- French Third Republic
