= Gédéon Geismar =

French military officer (1863–1931)

- Born: 10 January 1863; Dambach-la-Ville
- Died: 28 June 1931 (aged 68); Paris
- Education: École Polytechnique
- Military career
- Allegiance: France
- Conflicts: World War One
- Awards: Legion of Honour; Croix de guerre 1914-1918

Gédéon Geismar (10 January 1863 – 28 June 1931) was a French-Jewish military officer who became a Zionist activist later in life. He was the first president of the Jewish National Fund and a president of the Eclaireurs Israélites de France. He was the uncle of French politicians Léon Geismar and Max Hymans.

== Early life ==
Gédéon Geismar was born in Dambach-la-Ville on 10 January 1864 in the German Empire to Marx Geismar and Jeanne Léopold. He studied in Dambach-la-Ville's small Jewish school, where he learned German and Hebrew. (Note: He was familiar with the Alsatian dialect of German.)

In 1874, his father sent him to a boarding school in Belfort in order "to be French". He studied there until 1882.

Geismar graduated from Paris' École Polytechnique on 1 November 1883. Upon his graduation, he decided to pursue a military career, deciding to work with artillery.

== Military career ==
On 1 October 1885 he entered as a second-lieutenant at the School of Artillery and Engineering Application (French: École d'application de l'artillerie et du génie) in Versailles. On 1 October 1887 he was promoted to lieutenant in the 5th Artillery Regiment.

In 1894, Geismar became captain in the Second Foot Artillery Battalion. He was made a squadron leader in 1905 for the 40th artillery regiment.

Assigned to the staff of the Third Artillery Corps in Rouen in 1907, he progressed upwards to the position of lieutenant-colonel and had become the corps' chief of staff by the outbreak of the First World War.

Geismar entered the 44th Artillery Regiment when the war broke out. He was appointed colonel of the Regiment on 5 May 1915. On 28 October 1915, he was awarded with the Croix de guerre for his "talent of organization, his masterful manner, and his activity which are all beyond praise, which permitted him to obtain from all his subordinates, by his personal energy and example, the maximum results" which he had displayed during an artillery charge in September.

In 1918, he commanded the 21st Army Corps' artillery regiment in Strasbourg. On 7 February that year, he received the rank of brigadier general, assuming command of the 4th Army Corps' Artillery.

== Zionist activism ==
When Geismar finally retired in January 1923, he became increasingly active in the Zionist movement, assisting the development of Keren Hayesod (Reconstruction Fund), with André Spire. He then became honorary president of the K.K.l (Keren Kayemeth Leisrael or Jewish National Fund)'s Central Commission. His knowledge of Hebrew made him able to read Mandatory Palestine's press. He participated and was a member of the steering committee for France-Palestine, a Zionist advocacy group founded in 1926 by Joseph Paul-Boncour and Justin Godart. His fellow members included Édouard Herriot, Paul Painlevé, Jules Cambon, Aristide Briand, Raymond Poincaré, Alexandre Barthou, and Gaston Doumergue. The society's Secretary-General was Henri Hertz. In 1927, he was elected to the executive committee of the Zionist Federation of France. He helped found the Franco-Palestinian Centre of Commerce. In 1928, he accepted the presidency of the Éclaireuses et éclaireurs israélites de France (EEIF), saying he was "training the young recruits of the Jewish people."

== Death ==
Gédéon Geismar died on 28 June 1931 in the 14th arrondissement of Paris. He is buried in Montmartre Cemetery.

== Personal life ==
Geismar was deeply religious, having grown up in a devout family. He refused to garrison in cities without synagogues.

=== Family and ancestry ===
Geismar's father, Marx (c. 1817-1898) was born in Grussenheim, Haut-Rhin. His mother Jeanne Léopold was from Pfaffenhoffen, and died in Paris.

He married Parisian-born Marthe Léa Lévy on 16 October 1903. They had two children: Yvonne Geismar, a lawyer and the deputy mayor of the 15th arrondissement of Paris, and Jean Gabriel, a business magnate.

He had two notable nephews: Léon Geismar, governor of French West Africa, and Max Hymans, CEO of Air France.

== Works ==
- Instruction for the observation service in the German foot artillery, translated by G. Geismar, published in 1891.
- Instructions for the direction of fire in the German foot artillery published 1892.
- Organization of Objectives for German Artillery Fire Schools published in 1895.

== Decorations ==
- In the Order of the Legion of honour : Knight on 10 July 1907; officer on 1 January 1917; Commander on 29 December 1922.
- Croix de Guerre on 28 October 1915.

== Legacy ==
A road in his hometown, Dambach-la-Ville, is named after him.
