= Adolphe Deitte =

French colonial administrator

Adolphe Deitte (1879–1949) was a French colonial administrator; from 1928 until 1929 he was lieutenant governor of Chad. He served as that colony's governor from 1934 until 1935. He was the lieutenant-governor of Mauritania from 5 July - August 1934 and governor of Côte d'Ivoire from 1935 until 1936, replacing Dieudonné Reste in that capacity. In his turn he was replaced in Abidjan by Gaston Mondon.

== See also ==
- List of colonial heads of Chad
- List of colonial heads of Côte d'Ivoire

== Bibliography ==
- Marcel Souzy, Les coloniaux français illustres, B. Arnaud, Paris, 1940
