= Pierre Pasquier (colonial administrator) =

French colonial administrator (1877–1934)

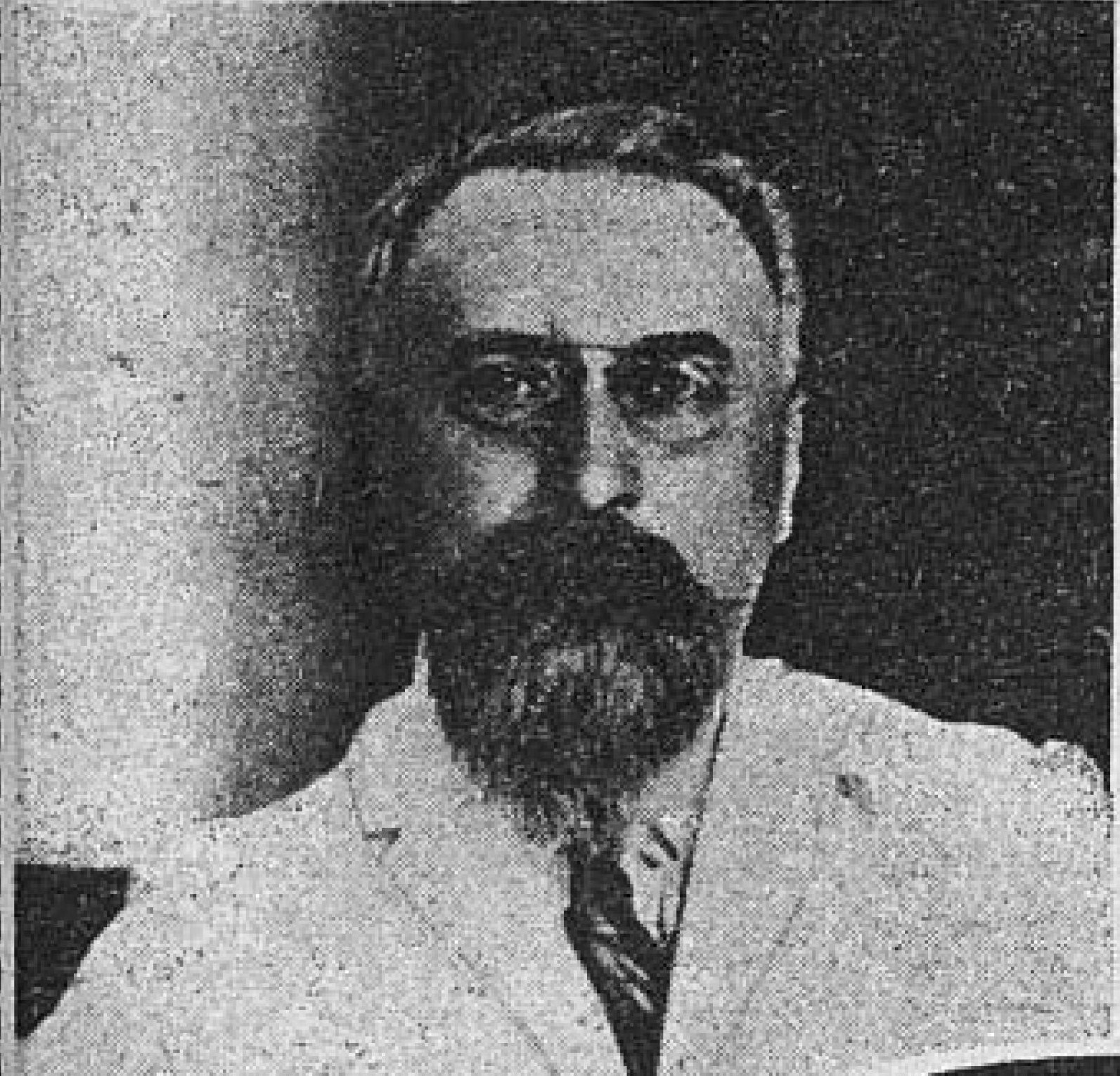

Governor-General of French Indochina
- In office 4 October 1926 – 16 May 1927
- President: Gaston Doumergue
- Preceded by: Alexandre Varenne
- Succeeded by: Maurice Antoine François Monguillot
- In office 26 December 1928 – 15 January 1934
- President: Gaston Doumergue; Paul Doumer; Albert Lebrun
- Preceded by: Eugène Jean Louis René Robin
- Succeeded by: Eugène Jean Louis René Robin

Personal details
- Born: 6 February 1877 Marseille, France
- Died: 15 January 1934 (aged 56) Corbigny, France
- Occupation: Colonial administrator

Pierre Marie Antoine Pasquier (6 February 1877 – 15 January 1934) was a French colonial administrator.

== French Indochina ==
Pasquier served as the governor-general of French Indochina two times; from October 1926 to May 1927 (in temporary replacement of Alexandre Varenne) and from December 1928 to January 1934. He died when the Dewoitine D.332 airliner he was travelling on crashed near Corbigny (France) during a trip from Saigon to Paris.

== Works ==
- Pasquier, Pierre (1907). L'Annam d'autrefois, essai sur la constitution de l'Annam avant l'intervention française (in French). Paris: Société d'éditions géographiques, maritimes et coloniales. ASIN B0038JD47Q.
- Pasquier, Pierre (1918). La colonisation des terres incultes: et le problème de la main d'oeuvre en Indochine (in French). Ardin & fils.

== See also ==
- Dewoitine D.332
