= Alexandre Varenne =

French politician and journalist

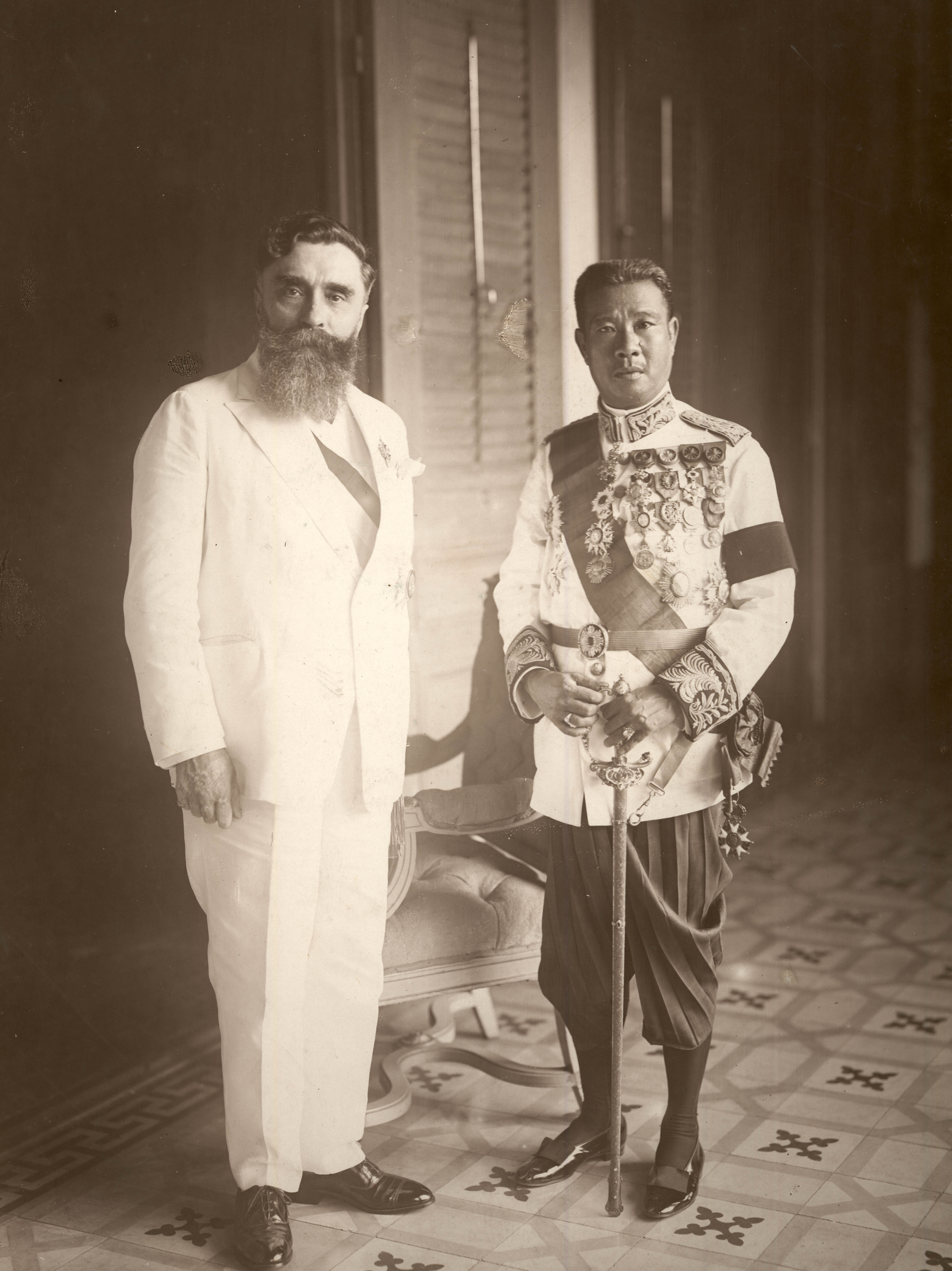
Alexandre Varenne and King Sisowath Monivong

Alexandre Varenne (French pronunciation: [alɛksɑ̃dʁ vaʁɛn]; 3 October 1870 in Clermont-Ferrand – 16 February 1947 in Paris) was a French politician and journalist, best remembered as the founder of the newspaper La Montagne. He was the Governor-General of French Indochina from 1925 to 1928.
