= Pierre Boisson =

French civil servant & colonial administrator (1894-1948)

High-Commissioner for French Africa Governor-General of French West Africa
- In office 25 June 1940 – 13 July 1943
- Preceded by: Léon Cayla
- Succeeded by: Pierre Cournarie

Governor-General of French Equatorial Africa
- In office 3 September 1939 – 28 August 1940
- Preceded by: Joseph-François Reste
- Succeeded by: Edgard de Larminat

Personal details
- Born: 19 June 1894 Saint-Launeuc, Cotes du Nord, France
- Died: 20 July 1948 (aged 54) Chatou, Ile-de-France, France

Military service
- Battles/wars: World War I; World War II; • Battle of Dakar

Pierre François Boisson (French pronunciation: [pjɛʁ fʁɑ̃swa bwasɔ̃]; 19 June 1894 – 20 July 1948) was a senior French civil servant, colonial administrator, and the Governor General of French Equatorial Africa (AEF) and French West Africa (AOF). His diplomatic career included two terms where he reigned as Governor-General of the AOF and one term as Governor-General of the AEF. During his second reign over these territories, he is remembered for assuming the role of High Commissioner to Vichy France. His diplomatic actions were met with strong condemnation from the French Resistance. These attitudes significantly aroused negative French public sentiment after the war until his death. As such, Boisson's legacy is significantly tainted by his decision to surrender French colonial control to Vichy administrative forces.

== Early life and career ==
Pierre Boisson was born in Saint-Launeuc, Cotes du Nord. His mother was a teacher and his father was a disabled war veteran. He took after the occupation ambitions of his parents to become a schoolteacher until the First World War broke out.

== World War I ==
During the First World War, he held the position of second lieutenant in the 71st Infantry regiment. He served in the battles of Artois, the Argonne, and at Verdun. Over the course of the war, Boisson attained many wounds, eventually having one of his legs amputated due to injuries in 1917.

== Interwar period ==
After the First World War, Boisson decided to take up colonial administration. His advancements were notably quick. In 1920, he was appointed as an assistant administrator at Brazzaville in the Congo. Over the next twelve years, he spent his career working in various African postings within the French colonies. By 1932, Boisson had been designated the chief of cabinet role of the under secretary of colonies.

Between 1938 and 1939, Boisson served as temporary governor-general of the AOF, governor-general of the AEF, and governor of the Congo.

== World War II ==
On 3 September 1939, Boisson had been appointed to the role of Governor-General of French Equatorial Africa.

By June 1940, the Nazis had overrun Belgium, the Netherlands, Luxembourg, and most of France.

On 25 June 1940, Boisson was appointed to the position of high commissioner of French West Africa. In the face of a mounting diplomatic crisis, Boisson believed that acting in favour of Vichy French forces, while being a difficult decision to commit to, was in the best interest of the French nation. Charles de Gaulle was notably critical of Boisson's decision to cave in to the diplomatic pressures of the Vichy administration in stating that Boisson's "ambition was greater than his discernment". Boisson, however, stood vehemently against German and English depredations of his colonial territories alike and, therefore, asserted territorial control by way of "defending the Empire from any and all invaders". Furthermore, Boisson's actions had been viewed as courageous acts of sacrifice for France's overseas colonies. On 5 June 1941, it was reported by the Glasgow Herald that he was to be awarded the Order of the Nation for the defense of Dakar against de Gaullists by Petain personally.

== See also ==
- Battle of Dakar
- French West Africa in World War II
