= List of colonial governors of Mali =

This is a list of Colonial Heads of Mali:

(Dates in italics indicate de facto continuation of office)

Term	Incumbent	Notes
French Suzerainty
27 February 1880 to 29 July 1880	Charles Émile Boilèv, Commandant-Superior	1st Term
Haut-Sénégal (French territory of Upper Senegal) under Senegal
6 September 1880 to 3 September 1883	Gustave Borgnis-Desbordes, Commandant-Superior	
3 September 1883 to 18 June 1884	Charles Émile Boilève, Commandant-Superior	2nd Term
18 June 1884 to 4 September 1884	Antoine Vincent Auguste Combes, acting Commandant-Superior	
4 September 1884 to September 1885	Antoine Vincent Auguste Combes, Commandant-Superior	
September 1885 to August 1886	Henri-Nicolas Frey, Commandant-Superior	
August 1886 to 10 September 1888	Joseph Simon Galliéni, Commandant-Superior	
10 September 1888 to 18 August 1890	Louis Archinard, Commandant-Superior	1st Term
French Sudan Territory
18 August 1890 to 1891	Louis Archinard, Commandant-Superior	1st Term (contd.)
1891 to 27 August 1892	Pierre Marie Gustave Hubert, Commandant-Superior	
separate colony
27 August 1892 to 2 August 1893	Louis Archinard, Commandant-Superior	2nd Term
2 August 1893 to 26 December 1893	Eugène Bonnier, acting Commandant-Superior	
26 December 1893 to 16 June 1895	Louis Albert Grodet, Governor	
Incorporated into French West Africa
16 June 1895 to 1898	Louis Edgard de Trentinian, Governor	
1898 to 17 October 1899	Marie Michel Alexandre René Audéoud, acting Governor	
Dissolution of French Sudan
17 October 1899 to 10 October 1902	William Merlaud-Ponty, Delegate	
Senegambia and Niger Colony
10 October 1902 to 18 October 1904	William Merlaud-Ponty, Delegate	
Haut-Sénégal-Niger (Upper Senegal and Niger)
18 October 1904 to 20 October 1904	William Merlaud-Ponty, Delegate	
20 October 1904 to 18 February 1908	William Merlaud-Ponty, Lieutenant-Governor	
18 February 1908 to 16 June 1915	François Joseph Clozel, Lieutenant-Governor	
16 June 1915 to 1 July 1915	Philippe Henry, acting Lieutenant-Governor	
1 July 1915 to 28 July 1916	Louis Digue, acting Lieutenant-Governor	
28 July 1916 to 20 April 1917	Raphaël Antonetti, acting Lieutenant-Governor	
20 April 1917 to 21 May 1917	Albert Nebout, acting Lieutenant-Governor	
21 May 1917 to 20 February 1918	Louis Periquet, acting Lieutenant-Governor	
20 February 1918 to 16 May 1919	Auguste Brunet, Lieutenant-Governor	
16 May 1919 to 4 December 1920	Marcel Achille Olivier, Lieutenant-Governor	
French Sudan
4 December 1920 to 21 August 1921	Marcel Achille Olivier, Lieutenant-Governor	
21 August 1921 to 26 February 1924	Jean Henri Terrasson de Fougères, acting Governor	
26 February 1924 to 31 December 1930	Jean Henri Terrasson de Fougères, Governor	
31 December 1930 to 4 April 1931	Joseph Urbain Court, acting Governor	
4 April 1931 to 11 June 1931	Gabriel Omar Descemet, acting Governor	
11 June 1931 to 31 March 1933	Louis Jacques Eugène Fousset, acting Governor	1st Term
31 March 1933 to 22 May 1933	René Desjardins, acting Governor	
22 May 1933 to 30 November 1933	Léon Solomiac, acting Governor	
30 November 1933 to 19 February 1935	Louis Jacques Eugène Fousset, Governor	2nd Term
19 February 1935 to 22 November 1935	Félix Sylvestre Adolphe Éboué, acting Governor	
22 November 1935 to 9 November 1936	Matteo-Mathieu-Maurice Alfassa, Governor	
9 November 1936 to 4 December 1936	Ferdinand Jacques Louis Rougier, acting Governor	
4 December 1936 to 28 March 1938	Ferdinand Jacques Louis Rougier, Governor	
28 March 1938 to 15 November 1940	Jean Desanti, acting Governor	
15 November 1940 to 17 April 1942	Jean Desanti, Governor	
17 April 1942 to 29 December 1942	Auguste Calvel, acting Governor	
29 December 1942 to 15 May 1946	Auguste Calvel, Governor	
15 May 1946 to 27 October 1946	Edmond Louveau, Governor	
French Sudan	French overseas territory	
27 October 1946 to April 1952	Edmond Louveau, Governor	
April 1952 to 10 July 1952	Camille Victor Bailly, Governor	
10 July 1952 to 23 February 1953	Salvador Jean Etchéber, acting Governor	
23 February 1953 to 2 December 1953	Albert Jean Mouragues, Governor	
2 December 1953 to 10 February 1954	Lucien Eugène Geay, acting Governor	
10 February 1954 to 3 November 1956	Lucien Eugène Geay, Governor	
3 November 1956 to 24 November 1958	Henri Victor Gipoulon, High Commissioner	
Sudanese Republic	autonomous	
24 November 1958 to 4 April 1959	Jean Charles Sicurani, High Commissioner	
Mali Federation	union of Sudanese Republic and Senegal	
4 April 1959 to 20 June 1960	Jean Charles Sicurani, High Commissioner	
20 June 1960	Independence as Mali Federation	

For continuation after independence, see: Heads of State of Mali

== See also ==
- History of Mali
