= Ducuing =

Ducuing is a French surname. Notable people with the surname include:

- François Ducuing (1817–1875), French journalist and politician
- Gabriel Auguste Ferdinand Ducuing (1885–1940), French Army officer
- Nans Ducuing (born 1991), French rugby union player
- Paul Ducuing (1867–1949), French sculptor
