= Volta-Bani War =

1915-1917 uprising in French West Africa

- Part of World War I
- Map of French West Africa, 1913
Date	17 November, 1915 – 12 August 1917 (1 year, 10 months, and 5 days)
Location	Burkina Faso, Mali
Result	French victory

Belligerents
France; Upper Senegal and Niger	Anti-colonial coalition

Commanders and leaders
(French Third Republic) François Clozel (French Third Republic) Joost Vollenhoven (French Third Republic) Henri Maubert	Yisu Kote

Strength
5,000	130,000 (total); 20,000–30,000 (peak)

Casualties and losses
300 killed	Unknown
- At least 30,000 Africans killed (including rebels and civilians); 112 villages destroyed

The Volta-Bani War was an anti-colonial rebellion that mostly took place in the area between the Bani River and the Volta River (now modern Burkina Faso and Mali) between 1915 and 1917. It was fought between a heterogeneous coalition of villages and the Troupes coloniales. Fighting also occurred between the coalition and villages that were either loyal to the French government or sought to remain neutral.

Around one thousand villages joined the rebellion representing up to 900,000 people. At peak strength, the rebels could gather 20,000 to 30,000 men, with approximately up to 130,000 people having fought against the French throughout the war. French authorities mobilized 5,000 troops, mostly Senegalese Tirailleurs and local auxiliaries, who were better equipped and supported by six cannon and four machine-gun units. The total number of deaths is impossible to determine with many poorly documented battles occurring between the coalition and villages that either refused to join them or had sided with the French. At least 30,000 Africans, including civilians, were killed, compared to around 300 French soldiers. French forces did not discriminate between civilians and combatants, razing about 112 villages to the ground.

The war started after the 1915 rainy season when a group of representatives from around a dozen villages gathered at Bona where they resolved to take up arms against the French occupiers. This took place in the context of World War I and introduction of conscription for the French Army. There was also widespread optimism that the colonial government could be beaten at this moment of weakness. It went through various phases as the colonial army organised two suppression campaigns but initially failed in its purpose, in the face of fierce opposition and superior tactics.

After roughly a year of heavy fighting and several setbacks, French forces defeated the insurgents, imprisoning or executing their leaders. Small pockets of resistance continued until 1917. The Volta-Bani War was one of the most significant armed oppositions to colonial government anywhere in Africa. It was the main reason for the creation of French Upper Volta (now Burkina Faso) after World War I, by splitting off seven districts from the large colony of Haut Sénégal-Niger.

The name "Volta-Bani War" was coined by Mahir Saul and Patrick Royer in their book West African Challenge to Empire: Culture and History in the Volta-Bani War (2001). A fictional account of the revolt was the subject of one of the important literary works of West Africa, Nazi Boni's Crépuscule des temps anciens (1962).

== See also ==
- African theatre of World War I
