= École normale supérieure William Ponty =

College in French West Africa

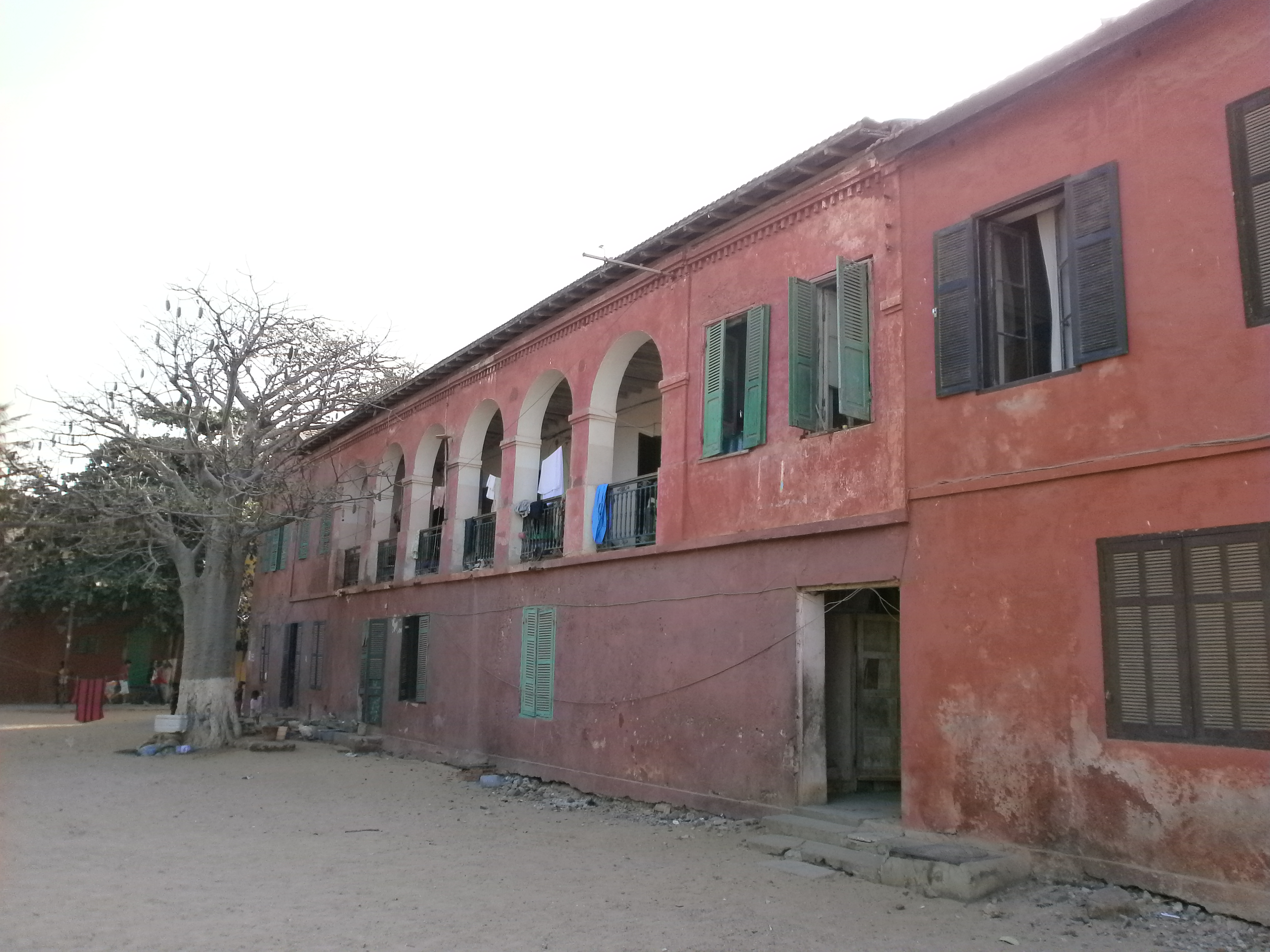
The site of the original École William Ponty in Gorée

École William Ponty was a government teachers' college in French West Africa, in what is now Senegal. The school is now in Kolda, Senegal, where it is currently known as École de formation d’instituteurs William Ponty. It is associated with the French university IUFM at Livry-Gargan (France).

== Notable alumni ==
Many of the school's graduates would one day lead the struggle for independence from France, including Félix Houphouët-Boigny and Bernard Binlin Dadié of Côte d'Ivoire, Modibo Keïta of Mali, Hamani Diori and Boubou Hama of Niger, Yacine Diallo of Guinea, Hubert Maga of Benin (Dahomey), Mamadou Dia of Senegal and Maurice Yaméogo and Daniel Ouezzin Coulibaly of Burkina Faso (Upper Volta). André Davesne, author of children's books like Mamadou et Bineta apprennent à lire et à écrire, and André Demaison are Ponty graduates, as are Justin Auriol and Marcel Séguier, authors of books to teach mathematics to elementary and middle school students. Other students included internationally known jurists Kéba Mbaye and Ousmane Goundiam and Guinean politician Diallo Telli, who was a founder of the Organisation of African Unity.

== History ==
Begun by Governor General Jean-Baptiste Chaudié of the French colonial government at Saint-Louis, Senegal on 24 November 1903, the school was moved to the Island of Gorée in 1913. In 1915 it was named in honour of the recently deceased William Merlaud-Ponty, Governor General of French West Africa.

From 1913 to 1938 the school occupied a building on Gorée originally built before 1800 for the pirate slave traders Jean and Pierre Lafitte. After 1938 the school occupied a former military garrison in Sébikotane, about 40 kilometres from Dakar, and a village called Sébi-Ponty sprang up to house the school's indigenous African personnel. In 1965 the school moved to Thiès, 70 kilometres east of Dakar, and a portion of the Sebikotane building was turned into a prison. During the government of Senegalese Prime Minister Léopold Senghor, repairs to the building at Sébikotane were neglected, and its occupation by squatters was tolerated. In 1984 the school moved to Kolda.

The school has a two-year common core curriculum followed by students intending to become teachers or administrative clerks. Those who intend to study medicine, pharmacy or midwifery study a further year of introductory science at William Ponty School before transferring to the National School of Medicine and Pharmacy.

== Bibliography ==
- Peggy Roark Sabatier, Educating a colonial elite: the William Ponty school and its graduates, University of Chicago, 1977 (thesis)
- (in French) R. Dumargue, "L'enseignement du français à l'école William-Ponty (AOF)" in L'Information d'Outre-Mer, No. 1, Jan.-Feb. 1939, pp. 27–32
- (in French) Christophe Batsch, Un rouage du colonialisme: L’École normale d’instituteurs William Ponty, Paris, Université de Paris VII, 1973, 97 p. (master's thesis)
- (in French) Yamar Sarr Fall, L’École Normale William Ponty de 1912 à 1948, Université de Dakar, 1986, 115 p. (master's thesis)
- Denise Savineau, Reports No. 1-18 to the Governor General of French West Africa, 1937 (French with English translation and annotations by Claire Griffiths of the University of Hull)
