= Vincent Allègre =

French lawyer and politician

Vincent Gaëtan Allègre
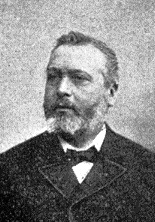

Deputy of Var on
- In office 5 March 1876 – 21 July 1881

Governor of Martinique
- In office 1881–1887
- Preceded by: Hyacinthe Laurent Théophile Aube
- Succeeded by: Louis Albert Grodet

Senator of Martinique
- In office 17 December 1882 – 1 February 1883
- Preceded by: Joseph Desmazes
- Succeeded by: Hubert Michaux

Senator of Martinique
- In office 21 October 1888 – 18 May 1899
- Preceded by: Hubert Michaux
- Succeeded by: Amédée Knight

Personal details
- Born: 7 August 1835 Six-Fours, Var, France
- Died: 18 May 1899 (aged 63) Mèze, Hérault, France
- Occupation: Lawyer, politician

Vincent Gaëtan Allègre (7 August 1835 – 18 May 1899) was a French lawyer and politician. He was a radical republican and was dismissed from his position as mayor of Toulon by the monarchist ministry of Albert de Broglie in 1873. From 1876 to 1881 he was Deputy of Var. He was then Governor of Martinique from 1881 to 1887, and Senator of Martinique from 1888 until his death in 1899.

== Life ==
=== Early years ===
Vincent Gaëtan Allègre was born on 7 August 1835 in Six-Fours, Var. His parents were Jean Baptiste Allègre (born 1798), a sea captain, and Henriette Alexandrine Baptistine Aycard (born 1808). His paternal grandfather was a garde champêtre on the King's estates. His family was legitimist, supporters of the Bourbon dynasty. Vincent Allègre became a lawyer and registered at the bar of Toulon, Var.

After the fall of the Second French Empire and its replacement by the French Third Republic on 4 September 1870 Allègre was named mayor of Toulon. He was also a member of the Var General Council for several years, representing the canton of Toulon West. Allègre was a radical Republican, a supporter of the Paris Commune, who protested the executions of Louis Rossel and Gaston Crémieux in November 1871 and veiled the tricolour flag at the Town Hall as a sign of mourning. Under the first ministry of the monarchist Albert de Broglie he was dismissed from his office as mayor on 24 May 1873.

=== Deputy of Var ===
Allègre ran for election on 20 February 1876 as Deputy of Var for the 2nd constituency of Toulon and was elected in the second round by 7,361 votes out of 8,227. He was reelected on 14 October 1877. His election manifesto pledged him to demand amnesty for the Communards and separation of church and state. He sat with the Republican Union and followed the policy of the Opportunist Republicans led by Léon Gambetta. He voted with the majority for invalidation of the election of Louis Auguste Blanqui, for return of the Assembly to Paris, for application of existing laws to congregations, for free and compulsory primary education and for the vote of confidence in the Jules Ferry ministry on 11 November 1880.

=== Governor of Martinique ===
On 20 July 1881, a few days before the next general elections, Allègre accepted the position of Governor of Martinique and resigned as deputy. In December 1881 Allègre said the clergy of the island was aligned with "the small reactionary minority", and Bishop Carméné^{(fr)} had agreed with "parties hostile to the Republic" to make out that the colony was totally disorganized. On 17 December 1882 Allègre was elected Senator of Martinique in place of Joseph Desmazes, who had died. He was made a Knight of the Legion of Honour on 24 December 1882. His election to the Senate while still Governor was cancelled on 1 February 1883 as being tainted with illegality. In 1883 he asserted,

I am more and more firmly resolved to administer Martinique according to republican principles; I do not care about the color of people and without distinction I welcome with favor whites ... and blacks, provided they are republicans.

Allègre was promoted to Officer of the Legion of Honour on 24 December 1886. In 1887 he was replaced as governor by Albert Grodet.

=== Senator of Martinique ===
On 21 October 1888 Allègre was elected to the Senate for Guadeloupe in place of Hubert Michaux, who had died. He was reelected on 3 January 1897. He sat with the Democratic Left group. He belonged to the colonial party. He was a member of the Colonial committee and vice-president of the Naval Committee. He spent most of his time on colonial issues including finance, economy and tariff administration. In 1889 he was involved in the question of improving French seaports.

In 1891 Martinique was devastated by a hurricane. A commission of members of the General Council undertook an investigation of damages that Allègre described as "meticulous" and estimated the total costs were almost 89 million francs. The central government considered this estimate to be extreme, as did the business elite of Paris, and reduced the estimated to 72 million francs. A commission of outside investigators led by Jean-Baptiste Chaudié further reduced the estimate to 50 million francs. Allegre wrote to the colonial office of the Ministry of Marine protesting that the outside inspectors did not understand the true losses of Martinique's "energetic population who, in trying to lift itself up, will use up its last resources and count on the future as well as the goodwill of the mother country." Allegre continued to pressure the government to arrange a loan to fund reconstruction and to provide tariff relief on sugar and tafia exports.

In 1892–93 Allègre participated in discussions on recruitment and organization of the colonial army. He also defended small rural landholdings. Due to failing health he moved to the calm of Mèze, Hérault, where he died in office on 18 May 1899.

== Sources ==
- Amayenc, Michel, "Gaétan Vincent ALLEGRE", Geneanet (in French)
- Church, Christopher M. (December 2017), Paradise Destroyed: Catastrophe and Citizenship in the French Caribbean, U of Nebraska Press, ISBN 978-1-4962-0449-3
- Delisle, Philippe (2000), Histoire religieuse des Antilles et de la Guyane françaises: des chrétientés sous les tropiques? 1815-1911 (in French), KARTHALA Editions, ISBN 978-2-84586-085-8
- Jolly, Jean, ed. (1960), "ALLÈGRE (VINCENT, GAËTAN)", Dictionnaire des parlementaires français de 1889 à 1940, Presses universitaires de France
- Persell, Stuart Michael (1983), The French Colonial Lobby, 1889-1938, Hoover Press, ISBN 978-0-8179-7833-4
- Ribbe, Claude (2016), "VINCENT ALLÈGRE (1835-1899)", Une Autre Histoire (in French)
- Robert, Adolphe; Cougny, Gaston (1889–1891), "ALLÈGRE (VINCENT-GAETAN)", in Edgar Bourloton (ed.), Dictionnaire des Parlementaires français (1789–1889) (in French)
- Vincent, Gaëtan Allègre (in French), Assemblée nationale
