= Albert Grodet =

French civil servant, colonial administrator and politician

Louis Albert Grodet
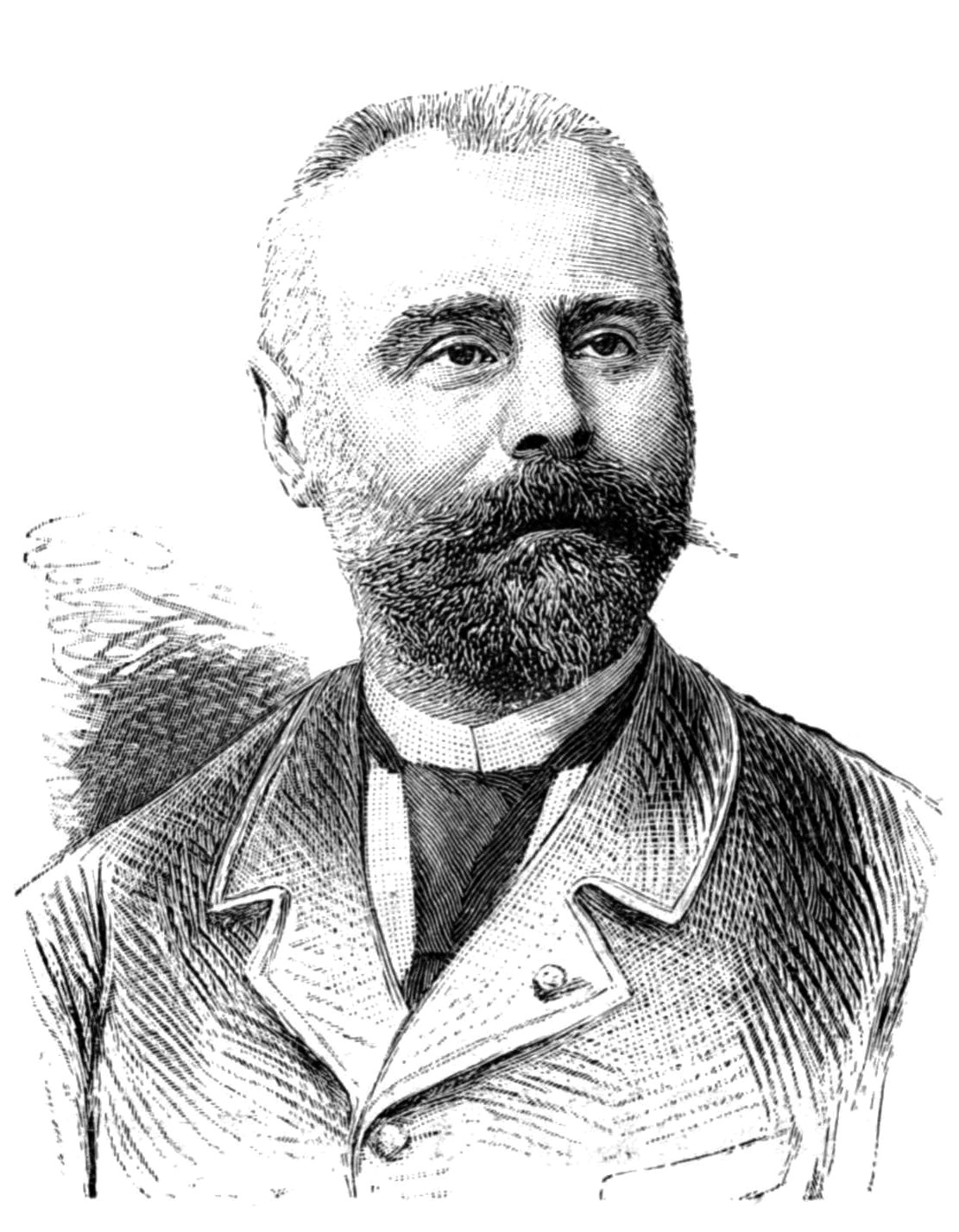
- M. Grodet, le nouveau gouverneur civil du Soudan français from Le Monde illustré, 2 December 1893

Governor of Martinique
- In office September 1887 – 1888
- Preceded by: Vincent Allègre
- Succeeded by: Germain Casse

Governor of French Guiana
- In office April 1891 – 1893
- Preceded by: Anne Léodor Philotée Metellus Gerville-Réache
- Succeeded by: Paul Émile Joseph Casimir Fawtier

Governor of French Sudan
- In office 26 December 1893 – 16 June 1895
- Preceded by: Louis Archinard then Eugène Bonnier (acting)
- Succeeded by: Edgard de Trentinian

Governor of French Congo (Acting)
- In office December 1900 – 1902
- Preceded by: Jean-Baptiste Philémon Lemaire
- Succeeded by: Charles Henri Adrien Noufflard

Governor of French Guiana
- In office 1903–1904
- Preceded by: Émile Joseph Merwart
- Succeeded by: Charles Emmanuel Joseph Marchal

Deputy of Guyana
- In office 24 April 1910 – 7 December 1919
- Preceded by: Gustave Franconie
- Succeeded by: Jean Galmot

Personal details
- Born: 4 May 1853 Saint-Fargeau, Yonne, France
- Died: 30 January 1933 (aged 79) Paris, France
- Occupation: Colonial administrator and politician

Louis Albert Grodet (4 May 1853 – 30 January 1933) was a French civil servant, colonial administrator and politician. He trained as a lawyer, then worked his way up the ranks in the Ministry of Commerce and then the Colonial Ministry. He was governor in turn of Martinique, French Guiana, French Sudan, French Congo and French Guiana for a second term. Although forceful, he lacked leadership skills and had poor judgement. In the French Sudan he was unable to stop the army from ignoring government instructions and pursuing a costly expansionist policy. He tried but failed to suppress slavery, at a time when the local troops often expected a share of booty in the form of slaves. After retiring he was Deputy of French Guiana from 1910 to 1919.

== Early years (1853–73) ==
Louis Albert Grodet was born in Saint-Fargeau, Yonne on 4 May 1853. His father was an employee of the Paris Octroi (shipment tax office). He earned a degree in law by the age of 18. He then joined the Ministry of Commerce for a career in the administration. He did his military service in 1873 in the 14th Infantry Regiment.

== Civil servant (1873–87) ==
Grodet quickly moved up through the hierarchy of the administration. He was a rédacteur in 1875 and deputy chief of office in 1881, when he served as deputy chief in the office of the Minister of Commerce. He was named a Knight of the Legion of Honour in 1881. In 1882 he became chief of office, and in 1883 was appointed deputy director at the central office. In 1883 he transferred from the Ministry of Commerce to the Colonial Ministry. In January 1886 he was promoted to Officer of the Legion of Honour. In January 1887 Grodet was admitted the Paris Bar as a trainee advocate, but resigned after the probationary period in March 1887. In 1887 the Ministry of Commerce named him an Honorary Deputy Director.

== Colonial administrator (1887–1905) ==
=== Martinique and Guiana ===
Grodet was appointed Governor of Martinique in September 1887, serving for just over a year. He then went into the reserve for a few years. He gave his support to the Congrès colonial national that opened on 10 December 1889 with the goal of "creating permanent relations among the diverse societies that are occupied with colonial questions." This was an early step in creating the influential colonial lobby in France. In April 1891 he was appointed Governor of French Guiana. He was particularly interested in developing public education in the colony. He was recalled in 1893. In Martinique and French Guiana Grodet gained a reputation as a tough boss who would keep tight control over his subordinates. He also became known for poor judgement and mismanagement.

=== Sudan ===
In 1893 Théophile Delcassé, Under-Secretary for Colonies, appointed Grodet commandant-supérieur of French Sudan in place of Louis Archinard in the hope of regaining control of the Sudanese budget and administration. Delcassé told Grodet, "the period of conquest and territorial expansion must be considered definitely at an end." Grodet was thought to be strong enough to face down the army officers, and certainly was not intimidated by them. He felt no need to be tactful. However, as a civilian Grodet had no control over his senior officers, who greeted him with "a wall of silence deliberately calculated to prevent me from taking any action." The code books had been removed so that he could not even monitor army communications. The only way he could have asserted his authority would have been to install civilians in key administrative posts, but this was impossible due to the unsettled state of the country.

When Grodet reached Sudan the acting commandant-supérieur, Eugène Bonnier, had already left on an expedition against Timbuktu despite strict instructions by the government to the contrary. Grodet reached Kayes on the Senegal River on 26 December 1893. The same day Bonnier left Ségou 350 miles (560 km) to the east on the Niger River bound for Timbuktu, which he expected to take without difficulty. Bonnier was following instructions he had been given by Archinard to continue the prepared plan for occupation of Timbuktu. At Mopti on 1 January 1894 a message reached Bonnier from Grodet ordering him to return to Ségou. Bonnier replied that his gunboats under Lieutenant Boiteux, which had gone in advance, had run into trouble at Kabara and he had to rescue them. On 5 January 1894 a furious Grodet sent letters that relieved Bonnier of his command. On 10 January 1894 Bonnier reached Timbuktu, which he entered without opposition, and joined Boiteux. Bonnier continued on from Timbuktu, and in the early morning of 15 January 1894 he and most of his column were massacred by a force of Tuaregs.

Samori Ture made a treaty with Grodet in which the French were to pay him an annual tribute in return for peace, then retired to the area south of French Sudan along the borders of what are now Mali, Guinea and the Ivory Coast. The war against Samori continued at increasing cost. During the war the only way the French could maintain the loyalty of the tirailleurs was to give them plunder, which meant slaves. The French also depended on slaves as porters, and the liberty villages became pools of forced labour. The practice was clearly illegal under the French law of 1848, which said "the principal that the soil of France liberates the slave who touches it is applied to colonies and possessions of the Republic." Grodet wrote in September 1894, "I cannot admit that on territory of the Republic at the headquarters of a cercle, among the articles of purchase and of sale are representatives of the human species." Grodet asked that liberty villages be established where there were none, and complained strongly about distribution of slaves. In 1894 Grodet tried to abolish the practice, but his army commanders made every effort to ensure the tirailleurs did not hear of this, since they might desert. Grodet was anti-clerical and was disliked by the missionaries, but one of them wrote of him

He had a thankless task which he performed in a malicious and maladroit manner, but men of good will always be grateful to him for his courageous initiative against slavery, the great plague of the Sudan. This praiseworthy act earned him the hostility of men who are in general upright, but warped by absolutely false ideas on this important question.

Henri Gaden wrote of Grodet after dining with him on 7 February 1895 that he was "well received, polite and talkative... With the eye of a half-deranged person, he is impulsive. A droll individual. Not at all what is needed for the countries around here, despite the high opinion he has of himself. [He] found a very difficult situation here and much hostility, but he has managed to make the situation even worse in attracting everyone's rancour." In May 1895 Gaden wrote "... what a blunder to appoint a civilian Governor in a colony where the Governor would be the only civilian; and an individual who knows absolutely nothing about the country! It is unimaginable!". Grodet was blamed for the lack of economic growth in the colony and for the defeat by Samori in the Ivory Coast of Parfait-Louis Monteil's Kong column. Grodet returned to France on leave in July 1895. He was replaced by Colonel Edgard de Trentinian. The Sudan was returned to military control as part of the newly formed French West Africa federation.

=== Switzerland, Congo and Guiana ===
While waiting for his next posting Grodet assisted the French Ambassador in Bern during arbitration of the Franco-Brazilian conflict over the borders of French Guiana, which had been referred to the President of the Swiss Confederation. In 1900 he was appointed Acting Governor of the Congo, holding office until 1902. He was again appointed Governor of French Guiana in 1903 and recalled in 1904. He retired from the colonial service in 1905.

== Later career (1905–33) ==
Grodet was readmitted to the Paris Bar on 2 August 1907, and enrolled in the Grand Tableau on 20 November 1907. He does not seem to have been very active in this occupation.

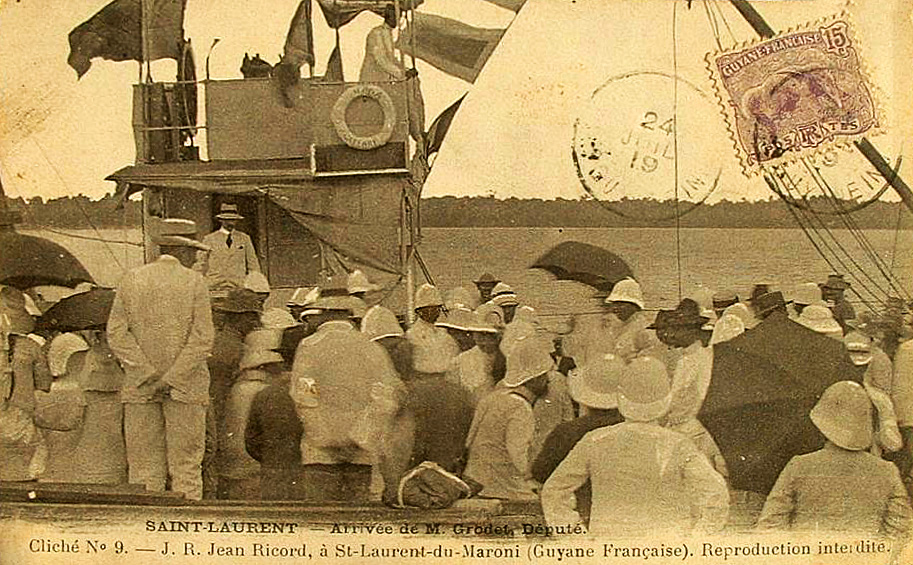
Arrival of the Deputy Grodet in Saint-Laurent-du-Maroni, French Guiana, 1919

On 24 April 1910 Grodet was elected Deputy of Guiana as an independent socialist in the first round. In the chamber he was mainly concerned with administrative organization and budgetary issues. He became in turn a member of the committees on External Affairs of the Protectorates and Colonies, on Economies, on Octrois, on Final Accounts and on the 1914 Budget. In 1911 he supported giving constitutional status to the Declaration of the Rights of Man and of the Citizen. He was reelected in the first round on 26 April 1914. He continued to be much involved in budgetary issues, and made many speeches on the subject.

Blaise Diagne, an indigenous Senegalese, was elected deputy for Senegal in 1914 despite protests about whether he had French nationality. He made his first speech in 1917, where he said that he had the right to serve as a deputy as a French citizen. The text of his speech was countersigned by Louis-Albert Grodet (Guiana), Paul Bluysen (French India), Joseph Lagrosillière, Gratien Candace (Guadeloupe), Georges Boussenot (Réunion), Achille René-Boisneuf (Guadeloupe), Henry Lémery (Martinique), Lucien Gasparin (Reunion) and Ernest Outrey (Cochinchina).

In the 1919 general elections Grodet was defeated in the first round by Jean Galmot. He resigned from the Paris Bar on 19 October 1927, at the age of 74. Grodet died in Paris on 30 January 1933.

== Sources ==
- Chathuant, Dominique (January–March 2009), "L'émergence d'une élite politique noire dans la France du premier 20e siècle?", Vingtième Siècle. Revue d'histoire, 101 (101), Sciences Po University Press: 133–147, doi:10.3917/ving.101.0133, JSTOR 20475551
- Dilley, Roy (2014-01-02), Nearly Native, Barely Civilized: Henri Gaden's Journey through Colonial French West Africa (1894-1939), BRILL, ISBN 978-90-04-26528-8
- Jolly, Jean, ed. (1960), "GRODET (ALBERT)", Dictionnaire des parlementaires français de 1889 à 1940, Presses universitaires de France
- Klein, Martin A. (1998-07-28), Slavery and Colonial Rule in French West Africa, Cambridge University Press, ISBN 978-0-521-59678-7
- Moor, Jaap A. de; Wesseling, H. L. (1989), Imperialism and War: Essays on Colonial Wars in Asia and Africa, BRILL, ISBN 90-04-08834-2
- Persell, Stuart Michael (1983), The French Colonial Lobby, 1889-1938, Hoover Press, ISBN 978-0-8179-7833-4
- Porch, Douglas (2005-06-22), The Conquest of the Sahara: A History, Farrar, Straus and Giroux, ISBN 978-1-4299-2209-8
- Roberts, Richard L. (1987), "The Colonial State and the Economy, 1883-1905", Warriors, Merchants, and Slaves: The State and the Economy in the Middle Niger Valley, 1700-1914, Stanford University Press, ISBN 978-0-8047-6613-5
- Roberts, Richard; Klein, Martin A. (1980), "The Banamba Slave Exodus of 1905 and the Decline of Slavery in the Western Sudan", The Journal of African History, 21 (3), Cambridge University Press: 375–394, doi:10.1017/S0021853700018363, JSTOR 181190
