= Joost van Vollenhoven =

Dutch-French soldier and colonial administrator (1877–1918)

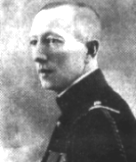
- Born: Joost van Vollenhoven; 21 July 1877; Rotterdam
- Died: 20 July 1918 (aged 40); Parcy-et-Tigny, Aisne
- Cause of death: War
- Resting place: Villers-Cotterêts, Aisne
- Occupations: colonial administrator and soldier

Joost van Vollenhoven (21 July 1877, Rotterdam – 20 July 1918, Parcy-et-Tigny, Aisne) was a Dutch-born French soldier and colonial administrator. Van Vollenhoven died in the Second Battle of the Marne.

== Early life ==
Joost van Vollenhoven was Dutch by birth. His parents had commercial interests in Algeria, then a French colony, and this is where he grew up, eventually studying law. He took French citizenship in 1899 at the age of 22, and entered the École coloniale to train as a colonial administrator, where he later taught. After his military service in the 1st regiment of Zouaves, he left the army as a reserve sergeant in 1902. By 1903 he was appointed Secretary General of the Ministry of Colonies, and director of finance in 1905. From there he was made Secretary General to the Governor of French Equatorial Africa.

== Colonial service ==
His most important early postings were as acting governor of Senegal and Guinea (1907). Moved to Asia, he became acting Governor-General of French Indochina from January 1914 to 7 April 1915, when he was replaced by Ernest Roume. Later he, like Roume, would be named and Governor-General of French West Africa (1917–1918).

== First World War ==
After 1914 van Vollenhoven had an enormous desire to return to Europe and fight for his adopted country.

In April 1915 he got his chance, having been relieved of his Civil duties he entered the African colonial forces of the RICM (Régiment d'infanterie coloniale du Maroc, later renamed the Régiment d'infanterie-chars de marine). Initially a sergeant, he was almost immediately promoted to position of Sous Lieutenant.

In his first period at the front he was wounded numerous times and received numerous citations for valour. After being wounded in Arras on 25 September 1915, he remained in hospital for 7 months. In April 1916 he is appointed as Chief of the General Staff of the 6th Brigade 6me Brigade Chasseurs au Pied.). He serves on the staff for over a year, until mid-May 1917. Alsace, in the Somme, and in Champagne. He is wounded again in 1917.

== Governor General of French West Africa ==
In May 1917 van Vollenhoven returned to his Civil duties as Governor General of French West Africa - this at the age of 40. His tenure as Governor General had an importance which belies its brevity. It marked a change in both the philosophy and tactics of colonial rule in French West Africa, brought on by crises and revolts which preceded him, and completed by post-war Governors General.

=== Crisis in the AOF ===
Van Vollenhoven was recruited to return to West Africa in the midst of crisis both there and in the Metropole. The war was going poorly for the French in Europe. The Governors General Ponty (1908–1915) and Clozel (1915) were under pressure to produce both resources and colonial troops for the war effort. The year 1915 was punctuated by a number of revolts in rural French West Africa over forced conscription into the Senegalese Tirailleurs and growing direct taxation of Africans who had no voice in the governing of the colonies.

=== Reforms ===
Van Vollenhoven suspended conscription in the Second zone of West Africa: those area's where the population was governed not by French citizenship law but by the decree system of the Indigénat. Instead he offered inducements to those Africans who held nominal French citizenship in the Four Communes in modern Senegal. Here he induced African leaders such as the elected representative Blaise Diagne and the Senegalese Marabout Amadou Bamba to recruit for the military, with the promise of an extension of democracy after the war. In 1916 the originaires (those Africans born in the theoretically free cities of Saint-Louis, Dakar, Gorée, and Rufisque) were granted full voting rights while maintaining legal protections offered by local customary law. Prior to this, most originaires had feared abandoning their rights to face local courts, and never begun the often arduous process of becoming French citizens.

In 1908, most African voters in Saint-Louis had been removed from the rolls by Governor General Ponty, and in the Decree of 1912, the government said that only originaires who complied with the rigorous demands of those seeking French Citizenship from the outside, would be able to exercise French rights. Even then, originaires were subject to customary and arbitrary law if they stepped outside the Four Communes. The protracted battle by Senegalese Deputy Blaise Diagne, and his help to Van Vollenhoven in recruiting thousands of Africans to fight in World War I, won legal and voting rights were to the originaires with the Loi Blaise Diagne of 29 September 1916

=== Economic centralisation ===
Economically, Van Vollenhoven used the colonial state system to enter into centralised trade and production agreements with the largest French companies. This had been the norm in French Equatorial Africa for twenty years, where monopoly concessions had pushed out the smaller French trading firms. Historians have analysed the post-war colonial system in the AOF as monopolistic, extractive, and mercantilist. France's West African colonies now longer existed as part of a great diplomatic rivalry, or to serve the interests of specific (if influential) firms. Rather they were to pay their way. Though they never did, this market oriented government logic, combined with a market free monopoly system was first formed by van Vollenhoven's administration. Clozel had helped create a board to coordinate colonial exports for the war effort which produced results at the expense of famine, revolt and huge flight of populations away from French colonies. Van Vollenhoven didn't change this approach so much as soften it. Under his rule the French demanded less, and did so through appointed African "chiefs". This was a model of how the French would operate after the war.

=== New model of administration ===
Philosophically, van Vollenhoven was a proponent of the Association: a variant of indirect rule, as opposed to the Assimilationist policy of his predecessors. This change had both positive and negative aspects for Africans living under French rule, but it was to become the empire's guiding principle until decolonisation. Van Vollenhoven's assistant, Maurice Delafosse and Robert Delavignette, (who was to later become High Commissioner of French Cameroon) inspired some of the most proficient administrative dissidents pushing for French decolonisation. Governors General Jules Carde (also a deputy to Van Vollenhoven) and his successor Jules Brevié put into place many of the elements of indirect and tiered authority first outlined under van Vollenhoven. In this revised colonial system, those Africans outside the urban centers and western Senegal were offered greater freedoms which (in promise) offered the full French citizenship of the Assimilation model. The rest of the population were subject to the Indigénat, and starting with van Vollenhoven's circular on 15 August 1917 "reestablishing" chieftaincies throughout AOF, Africans were increasingly subject to African intermediaries appointed by the French. During the war, with the risk of revolt fresh in the government's mind, head taxes and forced labor was used more sparingly, and greater oversight was forced on the previously unmonitored rule of French Cercle Commanders. This was not a reflection just of van Vollenhoven's regard for his African subjects, but rather a feeling that African cultures were at base un-assimilatable; a French reflection of the British concept of the "Noble savage" and a reflection of his boyhood as a European colonist in Algeria. While such arbitrary demands returned under his replacement Gabriel Louis Angoulvant and survived under the Indigénat system until 1944–56, the model under which later Governors General in French Africa worked was changed by van Vollenhoven's reforms.

But at the time, these changes were quickly reversed. By the end of the year he was engaged in a major disagreement with the French Government over the recruitment of African soldiers. Blaise Diagne had been appointed to Clemenceau's War Cabinet, and the French government felt that with his help, they could again begin recruiting African Subjects, a move resisted by van Vollenhoven. With the Governor General unwilling to put the plan into practice, the government threatened to appoint Diange a co-equal Governor General of Military Affairs. Angry and this coup, worried for the stability of the colony, and jealous of the success of Diange, van Vollenhoven resigned.

== Second service at front ==
On 28 Jan 1918 he rejoined his old regiment as Captain of the 1st Company of the first Bn.

Launching their attack from the Forest of Retz on the morning of 18 July 1918 the RICM had taken Longpont within 45 minutes of the commencement at 04:35 hours. Two hours later having secured the village the Regiment had advanced a further 4 kilometres and seized Mont Rambœuf. By midday on 19 July Parcy had fallen - their objective achieved the regiment secured their line that evening. It was during this final assault on Parcy that van Vollenhoven was fatally wounded leading his men into the attack at Montgobert, in the Longpont Forest (Villers-Cotterêts, Aisne). Captain van Vollenhoven was "observing, upright, without helmet, amid the ripe corn," when a bullet struck his skull. He had the power to get himself up and staggered to the first aid post. He died at the age of 41 while being transported to the field hospital of his division. He is buried in Montgobert not far from the village of Longpont.

There now stands a monument there to the RICM, marking their furthest point of advance on 19 July 1918. Over three days of fighting the regiment captured 825 prisoners, 24 pieces of artillery and 120 machineguns. Their own losses however were considerable - in advancing seven kilometres the RICM lost 754 men killed and wounded. Both the regiment and Captain van Vollenhoven received further citations for their achievements during the battle, and it is these that are inscribed on his monument. On 22 July 1918 the French 38th Division (of which the RICM were a part) was relieved by the British 34th Division.

== Monuments ==
- A memorial to Captain van Vollenhoven is located on departmental highway No. 2 (between Villers-Cotterêts and Longpont).
- The central secondary school in Dakar, Senegal named for Joost van Vollenhoven in 1940 was renamed after independence Lycée Lamine Guèye.
- Avenue Van Vollenhoven in Cotonou, Benin is named after Joost van Vollenhoven.

== See also ==
- History of Senegal
- French West Africa
- French Indochina

== Bibliography ==
=== Sources ===
- (in French) Une âme de chef. Le Gouverneur général J. van Vollenhoven, Paris, 1920, 285 p.
- (in French) Y. Cazaux, « Joost van Vollenhoven », dans Septentrion, 1980, 9, 3, p. 84-87
- (in French) Pol Victor Mangeot, La vie lucide et passionnée de Joost van Vollenhoven grand administrateur colonial, soldat héroïque, Impr. Montsouris, 1940
- (in French) Pol Mangeot, La vie ardente de van Vollenhoven, gouverneur général de l'AOF. Un grand colonial et un grand Français, Paris, Fernand Sorlot, 1943, 141 p.
- (in French) Albert Prévaudeau, Joost van Vollenhoven, 1877-1918, Larose, 1953, 61 p.
- (in Dutch) Silvia Wilhelmina de Groot, Joost van Vollenhoven : 1877–1918 : portret van een Frans koloniaal ambtenaar, Amsterdam, Historisch Seminarium van de Universiteit van Amsterdam, 1991

=== Works by van Vollenhoven ===
- (in French) Essai sur le fellah algérien, Paris, 1903, 311 p.
- (in Dutch) Multatuli en congé. Documents officiels inédits publiés par Joost van Vollenhoven, Amsterdam, Maas & Van Suchtelen, 1909, 89 p.

Government offices
Preceded by Marie François Joseph Clozel; 14 Jun 1915 - 3 Jun 1917	Governor General of French West Africa; 3 June 1917 - 22 January 1918	Succeeded by Gabriel Louis Angoulvant (acting for Martial Merlin); 22 Jan 1918 - 30 Jul 1919
Preceded by Albert Sarraut; 15 Nov 1911 - 22 Nov 1913	Governor General of French Indochina; 22 November 1913 - 3 March 1915	Succeeded by Ernest Roume; 3 Mar 1915 - 22 May 1916
