= Louis Hippolyte de Lormel =

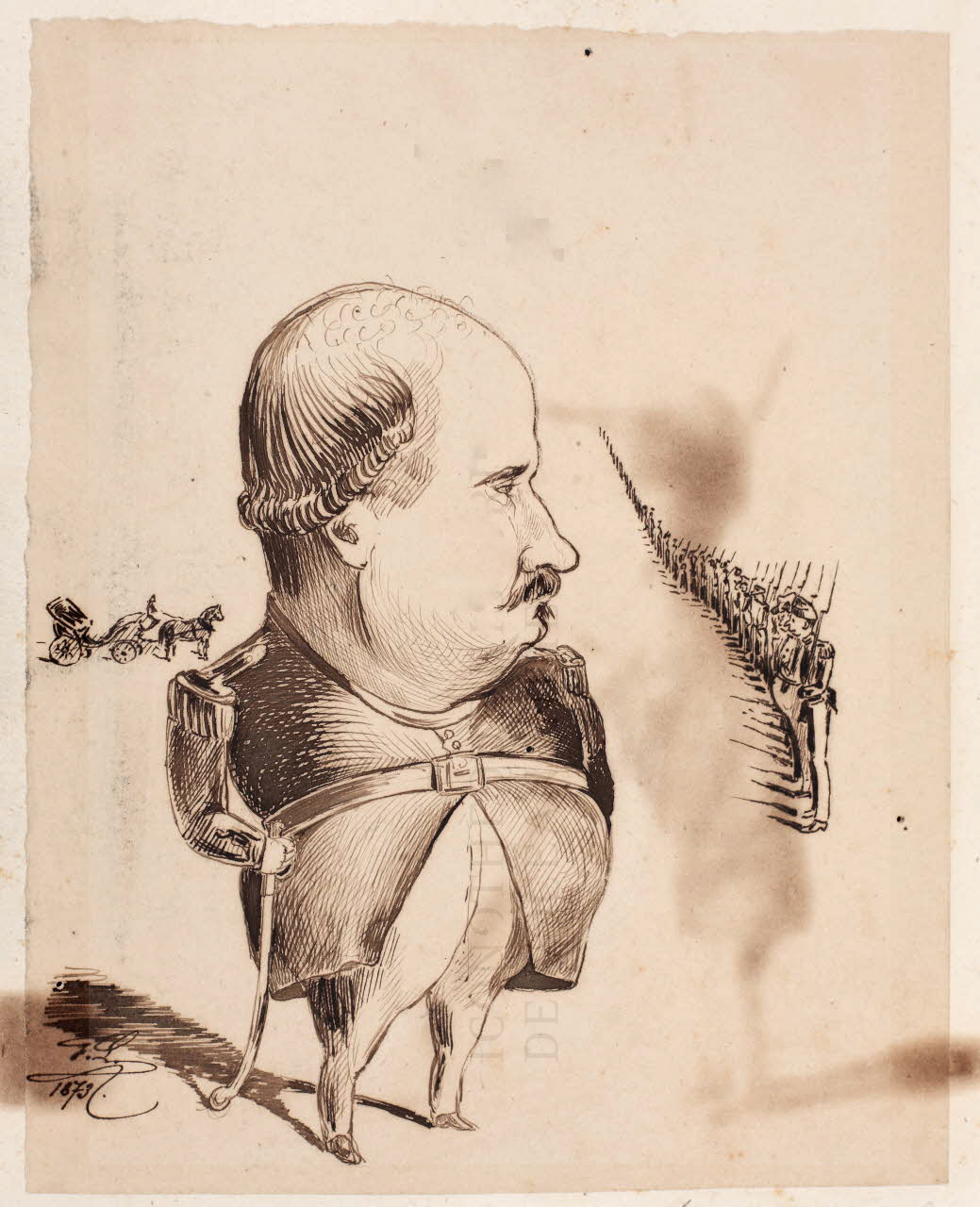
- 1875 caricature by Frédéric Maydell Legras

Governor of Guadeloupe
- In office 23 April 1864 – 7 December 1868
- Preceded by: Charles Victor Frébault; Joseph Desmazes (acting)
- Succeeded by: Joseph Desmazes (acting); Gabriel Couturier

Governor of Réunion
- In office 27 September 1869 – 18 September 1875
- Preceded by: Marie Jules Dupré
- Succeeded by: Pierre Aristide Faron

Personal details
- Born: 19 October 1808 Lesina, Dalmatia
- Died: 31 March 1888 (aged 79) Paris, France

Louis Hippolyte de Lormel (19 October 1808 – 31 March 1888) was a French colonial administrator who served as Governor of Guadeloupe from 1864 to 1870, and of Réunion from 1869 to 1875.

== Family ==
Louis Hyppolite de Lormel was born on 19 October 1808 in Lesina, Dalmatia (now Hvar in Croatia), where his father was a surgeon in the French army of occupation. He was baptized on 26 October 1808. His parents were Alexandre Louis Delormel (ca 1784–1861) and Elisabeth Angelinin (died 1835). His sister was Laure Adèle Delormel (1816–1877). On 21 December 1844, he married Narcisse Joséphine Laurent (died 1872) in Saint-Germain-des-Prés, Paris. They had a child Eugène François Louis de Lormel (1847–1910).

== Career ==
De Lormel studied law and became a notary. He rose through the ranks of the notarial profession, becoming Clerk Grade 1 around 1930. In 1933 he was living at 36 rue du Cadran in Paris. He served in Algeria from 1841 to 1858. He became a knight of the Legion of Honour in 1851, and later became an Officer and Commander of the Legion of Honour. He was given an honorable mention by the Minister of War for his fight against a cholera epidemic in Algeria. He was stationed in Paris from 1858 to 1859.

== Guadeloupe ==
On 4 February 1861, Lormel was appointed Director of the Interior of Guadeloupe. On 11 January 1862, Lormel became interim governor in place of General Charles Victor Frébault. Frébault resumed office as governor on 4 July 1862. On 26 February 1864, Joseph Desmazes became interim governor.

Lormel became governor on 19 May 1864. His son, Eugène François Louis Lormel (1847-1910), an army lieutenant, served as his aide-de-camp in 1874-1875. Lormel issued a decree of 18 June 1864 that removed the need for residents to buy and carry an internal passport at all times, subject to a year's labor if found without it, a law that in practice was only enforced for non-whites.

Lormel sent an Exposé général sur la situation de la Guadeloupe dated 26 September 1865 to the Ministry of the Navy, a useful source of information on the sugar industry. In September 1865, the island was hit by a violent hurricane, and this was followed by an epidemic of Asian cholera that continued until April 1866. In 1867, the colony had 151,744 inhabitants. It had a railroad 6.3 kilometres (3.9 mi) long.

Lormel appointed the convinced Bonapartist Frédéric Alfred Eggiman as Director of the Interior. Eggiman did not resign until 1873, when it became certain that France would remain a republic. On 7 December 1868, Desmazes again became interim governor of Guadeloupe, holding office until Gabriel Couturier assumed the post of governor on 24 April 1870.

== Réunion ==
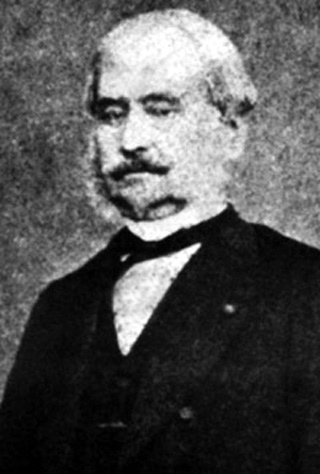
Lornel

On 31 August 1869, Lormel was appointed Governor of Réunion in place of Rear-Admiral Marie Jules Dupré. Louis Hippolyte de Lormel arrived in Réunion on 27 September 1869 to take over from Laborde, the commissaire ordonateur, who had acted as governor since the departure of Rear-Admiral Dupré. He was the first civilian governor on the island. His inauguration on 2 December 1869 was on the first anniversary of the tragic events in Saint Denis, (Note: There had been an anti-clerical demonstration on 2 December 1868 in which soldiers had opened fire on the crowd and killed nine people, with thirty wounded.) but he avoided serious trouble.

Many of the settlers in Reunion were dissatisfied by the imperial administration's financial management. A telegram of 20 July 1870 arrived on 5 August 1870 and told of the outbreak of war between France and Prussia. News of the fall of the Second French Empire began to trickle into the colony from the start of October 1870. On 2 November 1870, the passenger ship Emirne arrived in the bay of Saint-Denis and the news was official. On 3 November 1870, Lormel proclaimed the French Third Republic from the platform decorated with tricolor flags in the Place du Gouvernement. The proclamation was made to a huge crowd, in the presence of leading military and civilian authorities.

On 9 February 1871, a decree was published that allowed a 13 February 1871 election by universal suffrage for the 24 members of the General Council, which first met on 8 March 1871. News of the peace with Prussia arrived on 15 March 1871. Lormel's wife died in Saint Denis on 13 April 1872, and from 21 September to 22 November 1873, Lormel was given leave from his duties. His main achievement while in office was to develop primary education. He created a permanent health services at the end of his term due to the frequent outbreaks of epidemics.

== Last years ==
Lormel left office at his request on 18 September 1875 and handed over to Laborde as interim governor. Lormel died in Paris on 31 March 1888, and is buried in the Père Lachaise Cemetery, 14th division. The epitaph on his grave reads "Esprit élevé et libéral. Il a servi la France et aimé sa famille avec passion." (With a high and liberal spirit, he served France and loved his family with passion).

== Sources ==
- Annuaire de la Guadeloupe et dépendances pour l'année 1903, Basse-Terre: Imprimerie du Gouvernement, 1903
- Combeau, Yvan (2002), "De Bourbon a La Réunion, L'histoire D'une Île (du Xviie au XXe Siècle)", Hermès, la Revue (in French) (32–33), C.N.R.S. Editions: 91, doi:10.4267/2042/14363, ISSN 0767-9513
- Dragon, Denis, "Louis Hyppolyte de Lormel", Geneanet (in French)
- "Infanterie de Marine / 1869", Ecole Navale (in French)
- "La famille Dagomel", Généalogie et Histoire de la Caraïbe (in French), 17 June 2017
- Lormel, Louis Hippolyte de (1809-1888) (in French), AAPPL: Association des Amis et Passionnés du Père-Lachaise
- "Louis Hippolyte de Lormel : Gourverneur de l'île", Le guide de la Réunion (in French)
- Martineau, Alfred; May, L.-Ph. (1935), Trois Siècles D'histoire Antillaise Martinique et Guadeloupe de 1635 a Nos Jours (PDF), Pointe-à-Pitre: Société De L'histoire Des Colonies Françaises et Librairie Leroux
- Mignot, Dom. Aimé (October–December 2001), "Le conseil privé du gouverneur aux Antilles" (PDF), Bulletin de la Société d'Histoire de la Guadeloupe (in French) (130): 63, doi:10.7202/1043136ar
- Schoelcher, Victor (1872), L'arrêté Gueydon à la Martinique et l'arrêté Husson à la Guadeloupe (in French), Paris: Le Chevalier
