= List of senators of Martinique =

Location of Martinique in France

Following is a list of senators of Martinique, people who have represented the department of Martinique in the Senate of France.

== Third Republic ==
Senators for Martinique under the French Third Republic were:

In office	Name	Notes
1876–1882	Joseph Desmazes	died in office
1882–1883	Vincent Allègre	election annulled
1883–1888	Hubert Michaux	died in office
1888–1899	Vincent Allègre	died in office
1899–1916	Amédée Knight	died in office
1920–1924	Henry Lémery	
1924-1924	Fernand Clerc	election annulled
1924–1941	Henry Lémery	

== Fourth Republic ==
Senators for Martinique under the French Fourth Republic were:

In office	Name	Notes
1946–1948	Thélus Léro	
1946–1948	Victor Sablé	
1948–1958	Émile Lodéon	died in office
1948–1959	Paul Symphor	
1958–1959	Auguste Rejon	

== Fifth Republic ==
Senators for Martinique under the French Fifth Republic were:

In office	Name	Party	Notes
1959–1968	Paul Symphor	Socialist Party (PS)	died in office
1959–1977	Georges Marie-Anne	Union for the New Republic (UNR) then Rally for the Republic (RPR)	
1968–1977	François Duval	Union of Democrats for the Republic (UDR) then Rally for the Republic (RPR)	
1977–1986	Edmond Valcin	Rally for the Republic (RPR)	
1977–1995	Roger Lise	Centrist Union of Democrats for Progress (UCDP)	
1986–2004	Rodolphe Désiré	Martinican Progressive Party (PPM)	
1995–2011	Claude Lise	Socialist Party (PS)	
2004- 2017	Serge Larcher	Socialist Party (PS)	
from 2011	Maurice Antiste	Socialist Party (PS)	
from 2017	Catherine Conconne		First woman senator from Martinique

== Sources ==
- Liste des anciens sénateurs de la IIIème République par circonscription (in French), Sénat de France
- Liste des anciens sénateurs de la IVème République par circonscription (in French), Sénat de France
- Liste des anciens sénateurs de la Vème République par circonscription (in French), Sénat de France
- Liste par département – Martinique (in French), Sénat de France
