= William Merlaud-Ponty =

French colonial administrator

Amédée William Merlaud-Ponty
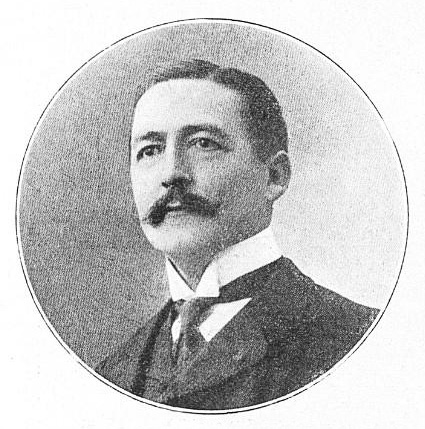

Governor General of French West Africa
- In office 1908 – 13 June 1915
- Preceded by: Ernest Roume
- Succeeded by: François Joseph Clozel

Personal details
- Born: 4 February 1866 Rochefort, Charente-Maritime, France
- Died: 13 June 1915 (aged 49) Dakar, Senegal

Amédée William Merlaud-Ponty (4 February 1866 – 13 June 1915) was a French colonial administrator. He was a Governor General of French West Africa (1908–1915) who particularly interested himself in the economic development and education of Africa.

During World War I, Merlaud-Ponty was responsible for recruiting volunteers for African battlefields.

At Dakar's railway station a 1923 monument dedicated "to the creators of French West Africa and the glory of the Black army" features Paul Ducuing's statues of the tirailleur Demba and the zouave Dupont. The same monument honours the French conqueror of Senegal, Louis Faidherbe, as well as four Governors-General, Noël Ballay, Joost van Vollenhoven, François Clozel and Ponty himself.

== See also ==
- (in French) Colonial administrators in Senegal
- History of Senegal
- Education in Senegal
- William Ponty school
- (in French) Dakar College of Science and Veterinary Medicine
- École nationale de médecine et pharmacie (Senegal)
- (in French) Georges Hardy, Une conquête morale: l'enseignement en AOF, L'Harmattan, 2005, 275 p. (ISBN 2747592979)
