= Native code (France) =

1881–1947 French colonial laws for natives

The Native code (French: Code de l'indigénat (Note: Code de l'indigénat (French pronunciation: [kɔd də lɛ̃diʒena]): called régime de l'indigénat or simply indigénat by modern French historians.)) was a diverse and fluctuating set of arbitrary laws and regulations which created in practice an inferior legal status for natives of French colonies from 1881 until 1944–1947. (Note: The Native code was promulgated by the French government for Algeria on 28 June 1881. It was officially abolished during 1946, but parts of it remained in force until Algerian independence during the early 1960s. The senatus consulte of 14 July 1865 implemented many of the elements of the future Code de l'Indigénat in Algeria, and prior to 1887, other colonial subjects lived under similar conditions.)

The Native code was introduced by decree, in various forms and degrees of severity, to Algeria and Cochinchina in 1881, New Caledonia and Senegal in 1887, Annam–Tonkin and Polynesia in 1897, Cambodia in 1898, Mayotte and Madagascar in 1901, French West Africa in 1904, French Equatorial Africa in 1910, French Somaliland in 1912, and the Mandates of Togo and Cameroon in 1923 and 1924.

Under the term indigénat are often grouped other oppressive measures that were applied to the native population of the French empire, such as forced labor, requisitions, capitation (head tax), etc.

== Introduction in Algeria ==
The Native code (French: Code de l'indigénat) was created first to solve specific problems of administering Algeria during the early-to-mid-19th century. In 1685, the French royal Code Noir decreed the treatment of subject peoples, but it was in Algeria during the 1830s and 1840s that the French government began actively to rule large subject populations. It quickly realised that it was impractical in areas without a French population, and French experiences with large groups of subject people had also convinced many that both direct rule and eventual assimilation were undesirable.

In 1830, Algeria became the first modern French colony. The treaty in which the Dey of Algiers capitulated to France stipulated that France undertook not to infringe the freedom of people or their religion. The term indigène was already in use in 1830 to describe locals who, whether Jewish or Muslim, were not considered French prior to the royal decree of 24 February 1834. However, they still did not have full citizenship.

A royal ordinance of 1845 created three types of administration in Algeria. In areas that Europeans comprised a substantial part of the population, the colons elected mayors and councils for self-governing "full exercise" communes (communes de plein exercice). In the "mixed" communes, where Muslims were a large majority, government was exercised by officials, most of whom were appointed but some elected. The governments included representatives of the grands chefs (great chieftains) and a French administrator. The indigenous communes (communes indigènes), remote areas that were not adequately pacified, remained under the régime du sabre, direct rule by the military.

The first native code was implemented by the Algerian senatus consulte of 14 July 1865, under Napoleon III, which changed the situation by allowing Algerian Jews and Muslims full citizenship on request. Its first article stipulated:

"Indigenous Muslims are French; however, they continue to be governed by Muslim law. They may be admitted to serve in the army or navy. They may be called to civil functions and jobs in Algeria. Upon request, they may be permitted to enjoy the rights of a French citizen; in this case, they are governed by the political and civil laws of France."

That was intended to promote assimilation, but as few people were willing to abandon their religious values, it had the opposite effect. By 1870, fewer than 200 requests had been registered by Muslims and 152 by Jewish Algerians. The 1865 decree was then modified by the 1870 Crémieux decrees, which granted full French nationality to Algerian Jews, followed in 1889 by étrangers ("foreigners"). The opposition was keen to give the same right to Muslims, but the French settlers did not want to equip the natives with rights equal to their own, primarily for demographic reasons. Moreover, it was at Algeria's request for an 1889 Act restoring the droit du sol, French citizenship being awarded to anyone born in France, not being applied to Muslims.

In 1881, the Code de l'Indigénat formalised de facto discrimination by creating specific penalties for indigènes and by organising the seizure or appropriation of their lands.

The Franco-Algerian philosopher Sidi Mohammed Barkat described the legal limbo: "Not really inclusion nor in fact exclusion, but the indefinite hanging on for some future inclusion". He argued that the legal limbo allowed the French to treat the colonised as a less-than-human mass, but still subject to a humanising mission. They would become fully human only when they had cast off all the features that the French would use to define them as part of the mass of the indigène.

In practical terms, by continuing the fiction that the "indigenous is French", the Code de l'Indigénat enabled French authorities to subject a large alien population to their rule by legal separation and a practice of indirect institutions to supplement a tiny French governing force.

== Expanding empire: 1887–1904 ==
While the Indigénat grew from circumstances of the colonial rule of North Africa, it was in sub-Saharan Africa and Indochina that the code became formalised. As French rule expanded during the "Scramble for Africa", the government found itself nominal ruler of some 50 million people with only a tiny retinue of French officials. The Berlin Conference specified that territory seized must be ruled actively, or other powers were welcome to seize it. The Indigénat was the method by which France ruled all its territories in Africa, Guiana, New Caledonia and Madagascar without having to extend the rights of Frenchmen to the people who lived there.

The protectorates (Tunisia and Morocco for example) were not affected by the regime.

== In practice: Africa 1887–1946 ==
=== Punishment ===
The commandant de cercle was free to impose summary punishment under any of 34 (later 12) headings of infractions specified by the code, ranging from murder to 'disrespect' of France, its symbols, or functionaries. Punishment could range from fines, to 15 days in prison or immediate execution. The statute stated that all punishments must be signed by the colonial governor, but that was almost always done after the fact. Corporal punishment was outlawed, but still used regularly. Although these powers were periodically reformed, in practice they became arbitrary and frequently used. More than 1,500 infractions reported officially were punished by the indigénat in Moyen Congo in 1908–1909 alone.

=== Taxes and forced labour ===
Along with the punishments were a set of methods for extracting value from colonial subjects. In Africa, they included the corvée (forced labour for specific projects), Prestation (taxes paid in forced labor), Head Tax (often arbitrary monetary taxes, food and property requisitioning, market taxes), and the Blood Tax (forced conscription to the native Tirailleur units). Many major projects in French West Africa in this period were performed by forced labour, including work on roads and mines and in fields of private companies.

Demands for taxes and forced labour varied according to the local cercle, and in some areas, forced contract labour continued as a staple of the colonial economy, such as if private enterprises could not attract sufficient workers or for projects of colonial officials. In the interwar period, the demand for forced labour increased massively. Even the most well-intentioned officials often believed in 'forced modernization' (supposing that 'progress' would result only from coercion), and French-created 'chiefs' also enjoyed tremendous coercive power. That resulted in enrichment for chiefs and the French, and harsh conditions for African labourers.

Plantations, forestry operations and salt mines in Senegal continued to be operated by forced labour, mandated by the local commandant and provided by official chiefs until the 1940s. Forced agricultural production was common in Sub-Saharan Africa from the 19th century until the Second World War, mandated sometimes by the central French government (rubber until 1920, rice during the Second World War), sometimes for profit (the cotton plantations of Compagnie Française d'Afrique Occidentale and Unilever), and sometimes on the personal whim of the local commandant, such as one official's attempt to introduce cotton into the Guinean highlands. Unlike the Congo Free State, infamous for its 19th-century forced rubber cultivation by private fiat, the French government administration was bound legally to provide labour for its rubber concessionaires in French Equatorial Africa and settler-owned cotton plantations in Côte d'Ivoire.

=== Native governance ===
In addition, native sub-officials, such as the appointed local chiefs, made use of forced labour, compulsory crops and taxes in kind at their discretion. As the enforcers of the indigénat, they were also partly beneficiaries. Still, they themselves were very much subject to French authority when the French chose to exercise it. It was only in 1924 that chefs du canton were exempted from the Indigénat, and if they showed insubordination or disloyalty, they could still, like all Africans, be imprisoned for as many as ten years for 'political offences' by French officials, subject to a signature of the Minister of Colonies.

=== Courts ===
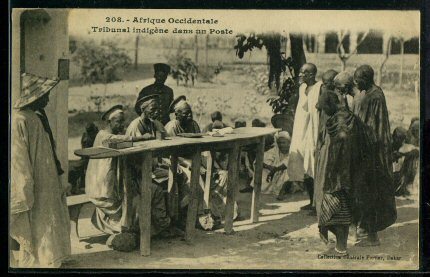
A customary court in French West Africa, c. 1920. Note the native judges are wearing traditional French judges' hats. A uniformed Guard de Cercle stands in the background.

In Africa, sujets were assigned to two separate court systems. After their creation by Governor-General Ernest Roume and Secretary General Martial Merlin in 1904, most legal matters were processed officially by the so-called customary courts. They were courts convened by village chefs du canton or some other French-recognized native authority or were Muslim Sharia courts. While Muslim courts had some real local relevance behind them, the French history of chief-creation was to replace traditional chiefs with Africans who would be dependent upon the French. Consequently, customary courts often served simply to increase the power of official chiefs. What was deemed customary differed from cercle to cercle, with the Commandant relying upon his native subofficials to interpret and formalize oral traditions of which the French had little knowledge. Civil cases that came to the attention of the French officials were tried by an administrator-judge in a tribunaux du premier degré for which the administrator-judge was an appointed African notable (other than local chief).

Matters deemed especially serious by the French officials or matters for which the colonial power had any interest were handled by a French administrator-judge. All criminal cases were handled by a tribunaux du premier degré directed by the chef du subdivision (the lowest post held by caucasians) with the assistance of two local notables and two caucasian officials or (in practice) anyone whom the administrator-judge chose. They could be appealed to the tribunal criminal, where the administrator-judge was the local Commandant du cercle and was not bound to heed the advice of even his own appointed assistants. Beyond that, there was no functioning appeals process though in theory, the colonies' governor had to sign off on all decisions that imposed punishments greater than those allowed for summary sentences. Historians examining the court records have found that governors were asked for approval after the fact and in all but a minuscule number of cases signed off on whatever their commandants decided.

Those Africans who had obtained the status of French citizens (Évolué) or those born into the Four Communes of Senegal (originaires) were subject to a small French court system, operating under the Code Napoleon as practiced in France. The lack of an adversarial system (in French law, the judge is also the prosecutor) may have worked in France but was hardly trusted by educated Africans. That may explain why French Africans' demand for access (promoted by politician Lamine Guèye) to both local and French courts was so strong and why so few who managed to meet the requirements of citizenship chose to pursue it but abandoned themselves to French justice.

Even originaires were not free from summary law. During 1908, most African voters in Saint-Louis were eliminated from the rolls, and in the Decree of 1912, the government said that only originaires who complied with the rigorous demands of those seeking French citizenship from the outside would be able to exercise French rights. Even then, originaires were subject to customary and arbitrary law if they stepped outside the Four Communes. It was only through a protracted battle by Senegalese Deputy Blaise Diagne and his help recruiting thousands of Africans to fight in World War I that legal and voting rights were restored to even the originaires with the Loi Blaise Diagne of 29 September 1916.

=== Resistance ===
Resistance, while common, was usually indirect. Huge population shifts occurred in France's African colonies, especially when large conscription or forced labour drives were implemented by particularly-zealous officials and when many African slaves were emancipated by the French authorities following French conquest.

Whole villages fled during the roadbuilding campaign during the 1920s and the 1930s, and colonial officials gradually relaxed the use of forced labour. Rober Delavignette, a former colonial official, documented the mass movement of some 100,000 Mossi people from Upper Volta to Gold Coast to escape forced labor, while the investigative journalist Albert Londres claims that the figures were closer to 600,000 sujets fleeing to Gold Coast and 2 million fleeing to Nigeria.

== Indigénat regime in Algeria ==
In practice, the Indigénat regime put in place from 1830 clearly appeared to be a favour done to the vanquished Algerians. They were not bound to respect French laws or French jurisdiction. They followed Qur'anic justice served according to Qur'anic custom until the abolishment of the Indigénat regime in 1945. To be admitted to full French citizenship, when that is possible, the Muslim had to renounce Qur'anic law and promise to follow the law of the Republic. There were important differences such as on polygamy, arranged marriage, divorce, and inequality between man and woman in matters. In 1874, a list of infractions punishable by French justice is made on the Indigénat on matters such as an unauthorised meeting or disrespectful act. In 1860s, the Indigénat regime was being debated. Napoléon III dreamed of an Arab Kingdom in Algeria, which was very unpopular for French settlers. After the Empire fell, the Republic tried to simplify naturalisation procedures and even a mass naturalisation, but that provoked massive outrage from settlers. The local authorities also dragged their feet to complicate the task of Muslums wanting to naturalise. That caused between 1865 and 1915 only 2396 Muslims in Algeria to naturalise.

The indigenous got a limited vote and participated notably in Muslim electoral colleges for municipal councils and had a minority of seats. However, the Muslim population was often the majority. Muslims were a fifth of the council until 1919, when they became a third. After the First World War, the Law of 4 February 1919 reformed the procedure for full naturalisation. That reform disappointed the Muslims, and only 1204 of them in Algeria naturalised from 1919 to 1930. Lyautey, followed the negotiations with the settlers, noted, "I consider the situation incurable. The French farming settlers have a full Gerry mentality, with the same theories on inferior races worth exploiting without mercy. They have no humanity or intelligence." (Weil Patrick, Qu'est-ce qu'un Français, Paris, Grasset, 2002, p. 241)

== Dissolution ==
Some elements of the Indigénat were reformed over time. The formal right of caucasian civilians to exercise summary punishment was eliminated by the decree of 15 November 1924. This decree reduced the headings by which subjects could be summarily punished to 24, which was later further reduced to 12. Maximum fines decreased from 25 francs to 15, and summary imprisonment was capped at five days. In practice, though, summary punishment continued at the discretion of local authorities. In French-controlled Cameroon, during 1935 there were 32,858 prison sentences for these 'administrative' offenses, compared to 3,512 for common law offenses.

Head taxes had been increasing well above inflation from the First World War right through to the economic crisis of the 1930s and reached their high point during the Second World War, but it was decolonisation which saw a real drop in taxes paid without representation.

Gradually, the corvée system was reformed because of international criticism and popular resistance. In French West Africa, the corvée had been formalised by the local decree of 25 November 1912. Duration and conditions varied, but as of 1926, all able-bodied men were required to work for no longer than eight days at a stint in Senegal, ten in Guinea and twelve in Soudan and Mauritania. Workers were supposed to be provided with food if they were working more than 5 km from home, but that was often ignored. In 1930, the Geneva Convention outlawed the corvée, but France substituted a work tax (Prestation) by the French West Africa decree of 12 September 1930 in which able-bodied men were assessed a high monetary tax, which they could pay via forced labor.

=== Political moves ===
It was, in fact, political processes that doomed the indigénat system.

The Popular Front government in the decrees of 11 March and 20 March 1937 created the first labor regulations on work contracts and the creation of trade unions, but they remained largely unenforced until the late 1940s.

The journalism of André Gide and Albert Londres, the political pressure of the French left and groups like the League for Human Rights and Popular Aid put pressure on the colonial system, but it was the promises made at the Brazzaville Conference of 1944, the crucial role of the colonies for the Free French during the Second World War and the looming Indochina War and the Malagasy Uprising that all made the new Fourth Republic reorient France to decolonization. The declaration at Brazzaville, more revolutionary for its discussion of the issue rather than any formal process, declared the "progressive suppression" of the code de l'indigénat but only after the end of the war.

The small political representation from the colonies after the war made ending the indigénat as a primary goal even though the men were drawn from the Évolué class of full French citizens. The passage of the Loi Lamine Guèye was the culmination of this process, and repealed the courts and labour laws of the Indigénat.

Legally, the Indigénat was dismantled in three phases. The ordinance of 7 May 1944 suppressed the summary punishment statutes, and offered citizenship to those who met certain criteria and would surrender their rights to native or Muslim courts. The citizenship was labeled à titre personnel: their (even-future) children would still be subject to the Indigénat. The loi Lamine Guèye of 7 April 1946 formally extended citizenship across the empire, indigènes included. Third, the law of 20 September 1947 eliminated the two-tier court system and mandated equal access to public employment.

Applied in fact only very slowly, the abrogation of the code de l'indigénat did not become real during 1962, when most of the colonies had become independent and French law adopted the notion of double jus soli. Thus, any children of colonial parents born in French-ruled territory became French citizens. All others were by then full citizens of their respective nations.

Full voting representation and full French legal, labour, and property rights were never offered to the entire sujet class. The Loi Cadre of 1956 extended more rights, including consultative 'legislatures' for the colonies within the French Union. Within three years, this was replaced by the referendum on the French Community in which colonies could vote for independence The First Indochina War resulted in independence for the different regions of French Indochina. The Algerian War and the French Fifth Republic of 1958 resulted in independence for most of the rest of empire in 1959 to 1962. The Comoros Islands (except Mayotte) and Djibouti gained independence during the 1970s. Those parts of the empire that remained (Mayotte, New Caledonia and French Guiana) became legally parts of France and only then was the category of French subject ended.

== See also ==
- Armée indigène
- Assimilation (French colonialism)
- Code Noir (1689)
- Décret Crémieux
- Évolués
- French citizenship and identity
- French Colonial Empire
- French nationality law
- French rule in Algeria
- French Union
- Indirect rule
- Indygenat, recognition of foreign noble status in the Polish-Lithuanian Commonwealth
- Loi Cadre (1956 Overseas Reform Act)
