= Eugène Bonnier =

French soldier

Tite Pierre Marie Adolphe Eugène Bonnier
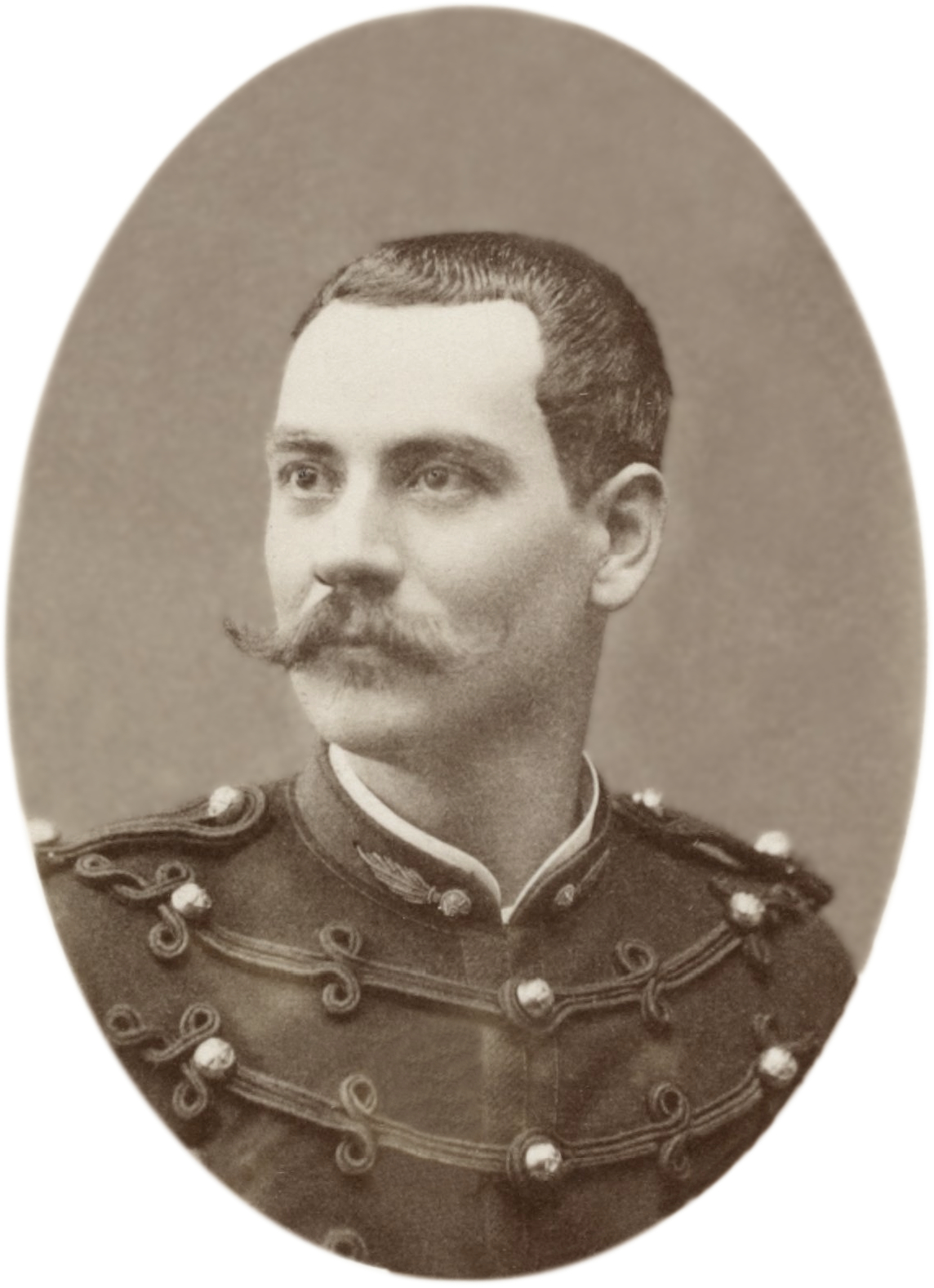

Commandant Supérieur of French Sudan
- In office 2 August 1893 – 26 December 1893
- Preceded by: Louis Archinard
- Succeeded by: Albert Grodet

Personal details
- Born: 4 January 1856 Saint-Leu, Réunion
- Died: 15 January 1894 (aged 38) near Timbuktu, French Sudan
- Occupation: Soldier

Tite Pierre Marie Adolphe Eugène Bonnier (4 January 1856 –15 January 1894) was a French soldier. He served in New Caledonia, Senegal and Tonkin. He and most of the men in his column were killed by a force of Tuaregs in a dawn massacre outside Timbuktu in what is now Mali.

== Early years ==
Tite Pierre Marie Adolphe Eugène Bonnier was born on 4 January 1856 in Saint-Leu, Réunion, His parents were Eugène Constant Bonnier (1819–88), a banker, and Henriette Ferdinande Elisa de Pindray D'Ambelle (1823–63). His brother, Gaëtan Bonnier (1857–1944) became a divisional general. Eugène Bonnier was described as "Brown hair, high forehead, strong nose, dark chestnut eyes, small mouth, round chin, oval face, 171 centimetres (67 in)".

== Army career ==
Bonnier became a colonel in the army, and was assigned to topography in New Caledonia and then in French Sudan. In 1883 he participated in the Upper Senegal expedition under Gustave Borgnis-Desbordes. As a captain of the artillery and marine, he was named Chevalier of the Legion of Honour on 16 August 1883. He was orderly officer for Borgnis-Desbordes from 1886 to 1893. He participated in the Tonkin Campaign in 1888–89. In 1893 Bonnier succeeded Louis Archinard as military commander of the Sudan, and left from Bordeaux on 5 August 1893 to take up his new command. He had no instructions and had decided to follow Archinard's advice, use his own judgement and seize Timbuktu.

== Timbutu expedition ==
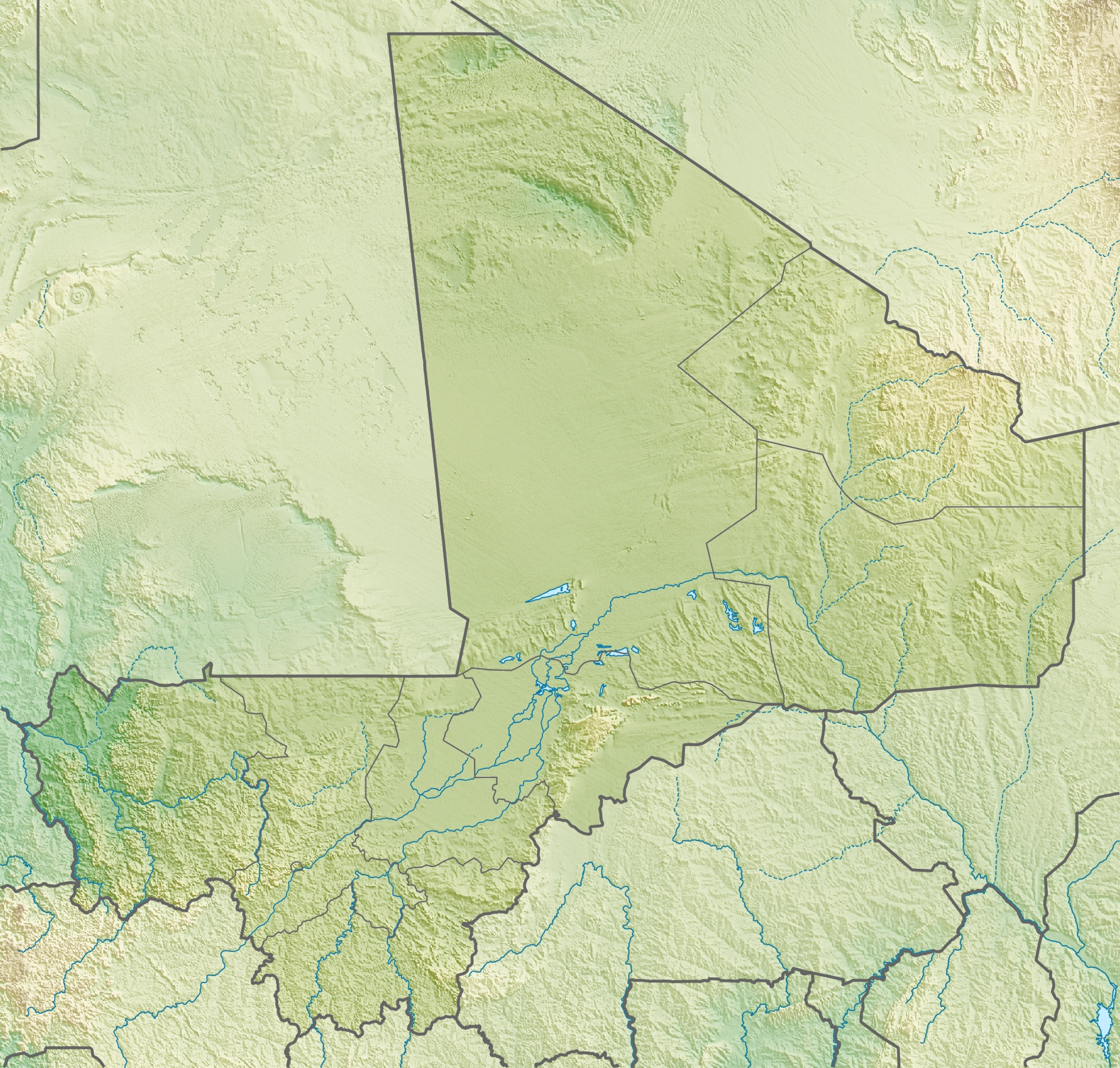
Locations in Mali

When the civilian governor Albert Grodet reached Sudan Eugène Bonnier had left on an expedition against Timbuktu despite strict instructions by the government to the contrary. Bonnier was following instructions he had been given by Archinard to continue the prepared plan for occupation of Timbuktu. Grodet reached Kayes on the Senegal River on 26 December 1893. The same day Bonnier left Ségou 350 miles (560 km) to the east on the Niger River bound for Timbuktu, which he expected to take without difficulty. Bonnier's force consisted of 204 Senegalese tirailleurs, 13 French officers and 9 non-commissioned officers. They had two eight-millimeter cannons, and travelled down the Niger in a small flotilla of canoes. Lieutenant H. Boiteux preceded the force with two gunboats. Bonnier was followed two days later by Major Joseph Joffre with a force of 400 infantry and cavalry, 700 porters, 200 mules and a battery of field artillery.

Soon after leaving Segou, Bonnier received a message from Grodet saying he had taken charge. Bonnier replied on 27 December 1893 that he was making a tour of inspection of the northern frontier. Bonnier reached Mopti after four days, and found that rather than wait there as ordered, Boiteux had continued with the gunboats to Kabara, the port for Timbuktu. On 1 January 1894 Bonnier pushed on, struggling through the swampy Inner Niger Delta. Several boats sank, including the one with the artillery. A message reached Bonnier from Grodet ordering him to return to Ségou. Bonnier replied that his gunboats under Lieutenant Boiteux, which had gone in advance, had run into trouble at Kabara and he had to rescue them. On 5 January 1894 a furious Grodet sent letters that relieved Bonnier and Joffre of their commands.

On 10 January 1894 Bonnier reached Kabara. He found that Boiteux had reached the port on 28 December 1893, and had walked into Timbuktu with four Europeans and some African sailors without incident. In Boiteux's absence a force of Tuareg had attacked the gunboats and killed 17 of the men. Bonnier left one of the companies of tirailleurs at Kabara and marched to Timbuktu with the other. In a heated interview he accused Boiteux of having left the main party that he should have been protecting, and of having then abandoned his boats with the loss of 17 men, so he could be the first to reach Timbuktu. Bonnier confined Boiteux to quarters for thirty days, a lenient sentence but typical of colonial Africa of the time when all the soldiers were scrambling to obtain glory.

== Death and legacy ==
Bonnier left Timbuktu and moved west towards Goundam. On 12 January 1894 he raided a Tuareg encampment and took over 500 sheep, cattle and camels. On 14 January 1894 the column camped within a square stockade of thorn bushes, leaving their livestock tethered outside. At four the next morning the Tuaregs attacked. The animals stampeded and the Tuareg broke through the thorns and killed Bonnier and 11 other officers, two NGOs, a native interpreter and 68 tirailleurs. One officer managed to escape, Captain Nigotte, and accompanied by a few other survivors brought back the news of the massacre.

The death of Bonnier followed the 1881 massacre by Tuaregs of the expedition of Paul Flatters. The general view in France was that Bonnier too had died because of rashness and incompetence, and in particular because of his failure to patrol or post enough guards. However, after the disappearance in 1896 of the desert expedition organized by the marquis de Morès there were growing demands to inflict punishment on the Tuaregs. General Louis Archimbaud was dispatched to retake the Niger Bend, another expedition went to seize Lake Chad, and Jean-Baptiste Marchand set out from the Congo to take the eastern Sudan, where he was stopped at Fashoda by the large Anglo-British expedition that was operating against Muhammad Ahmad the self-proclaimed Mahdi.

== Publications ==
- Bonnier, Eugène (January–July 1894), 3 croquis : "Marche de la colonne Bonnier du 12 au 15 janvier 1894", combat de "Tacoubao" et "Croquis de Tombouctou" (au verso, fin d'un texte sur la conquête du Soudan, daté 7-13 juillet 1894) (Three sketches), Document d'archives

== Sources ==
- "BONNIER Tite Pierre Marie Adolphe", Léonore (in French), French Archives Nationales
- Eugène Bonnier (1856-1894) (in French), BnF: Bibliothequenationale de France
- Fleming, Fergus (2007-12-01), The Sword and the Cross: Two Men and an Empire of Sand, Grove/Atlantic, Incorporated, ISBN 978-0-8021-9752-8
- Garric, Alain, "Eugène BONNIER", geneanet (in French)
- Moor, Jaap A. de; Wesseling, H. L. (1989), Imperialism and War: Essays on Colonial Wars in Asia and Africa, BRILL, ISBN 90-04-08834-2
- Porch, Douglas (2005-06-22), The Conquest of the Sahara: A History, Farrar, Straus and Giroux, ISBN 978-1-4299-2209-8
- Slavin, David Henry (2001-10-09), Colonial Cinema and Imperial France, 1919–1939: White Blind Spots, Male Fantasies, Settler Myths, JHU Press, ISBN 978-0-8018-6616-6
