= Gaëtan Bonnier =

French general (1857–1944)

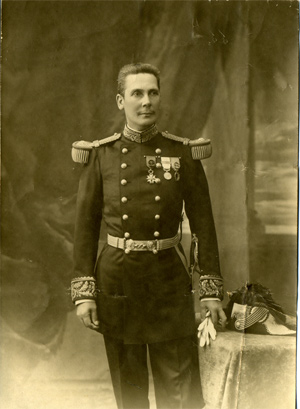
Bonnier in 1900

François Xavier Louis Henry Gaëtan Bonnier (3 December 1857 – 29 October 1944) was the first French general to learn to fly. During the First World War, Bonnier participated in the Battle of the Somme as the head of the 16th Colonial Infantry Division. From December 1917 to December 1919 he was the Commander of the colonial forces of French West Africa.

His older brother, Eugène Bonnier (1856–84), was also a soldier, and died during an expedition to Timbuktu when he was killed by a force of Tuaregs in a dawn massacre.
