= Ernest Roume =

French colonial administrator

Ernest Nestor Roume
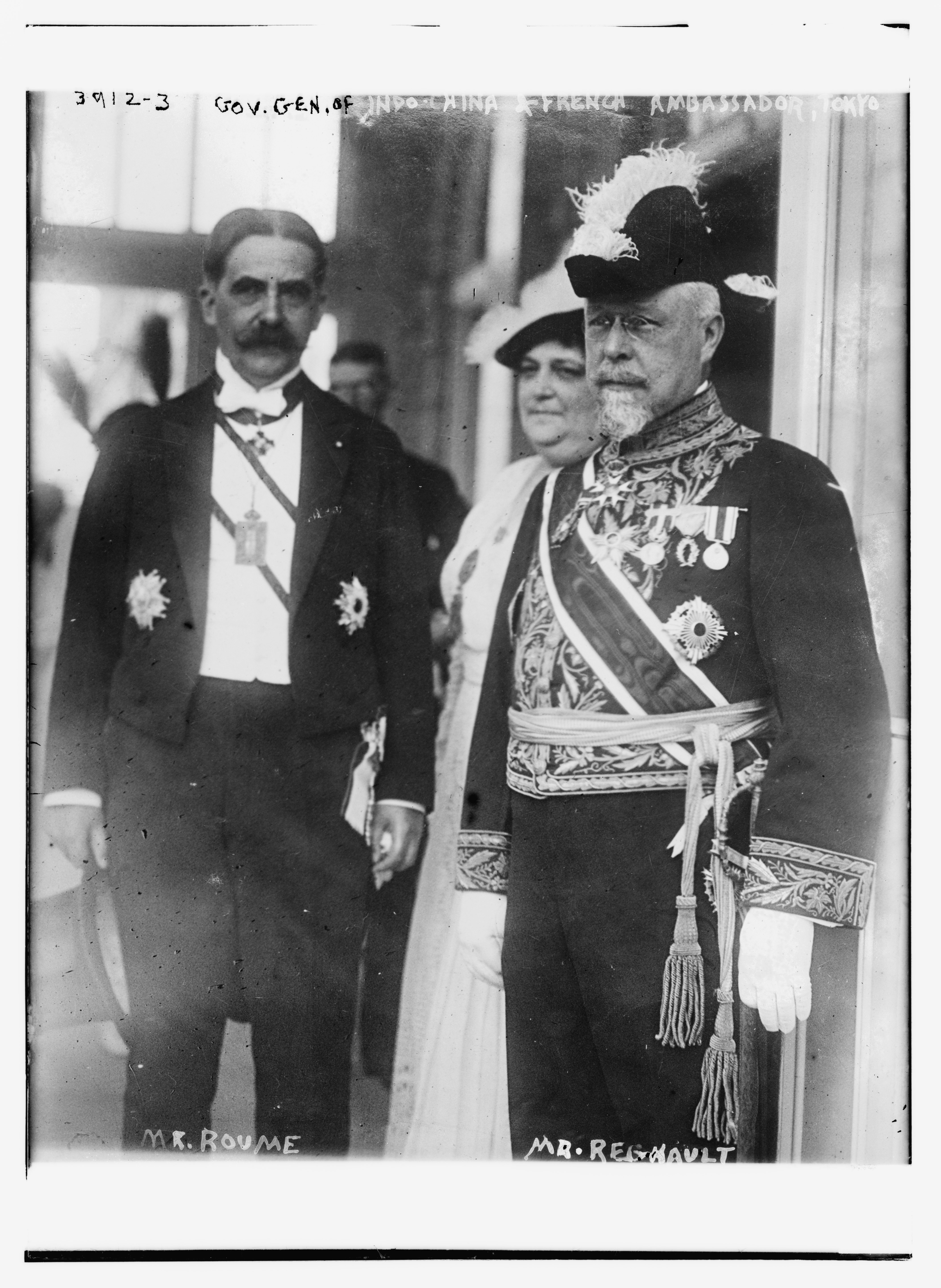
- Ernest Roume (on left), 1916

Governor General of French Indochina
- In office 3 March 1915 – 22 May 1916
- President: Raymond Poincaré
- Preceded by: Joost van Vollenhoven
- Succeeded by: Jean-François dit Eugène Charles

Governor General of French West Africa
- In office 15 March 1902 – 15 December 1907
- President: Émile Loubet; Armand Fallières
- Preceded by: Noël Ballay
- Succeeded by: William Merlaud-Ponty

Personal details
- Born: 12 July 1858 Marseille, France
- Died: 16 April 1941 (aged 82)

Ernest Nestor Roume (12 July 1858 – 16 April 1941) was a French colonial administrator and governor of French West Africa from 15 March 1902 to 15 December 1907, and governor of French Indochina from 1915–1916.
