= Parcy-et-Tigny =

- Commune
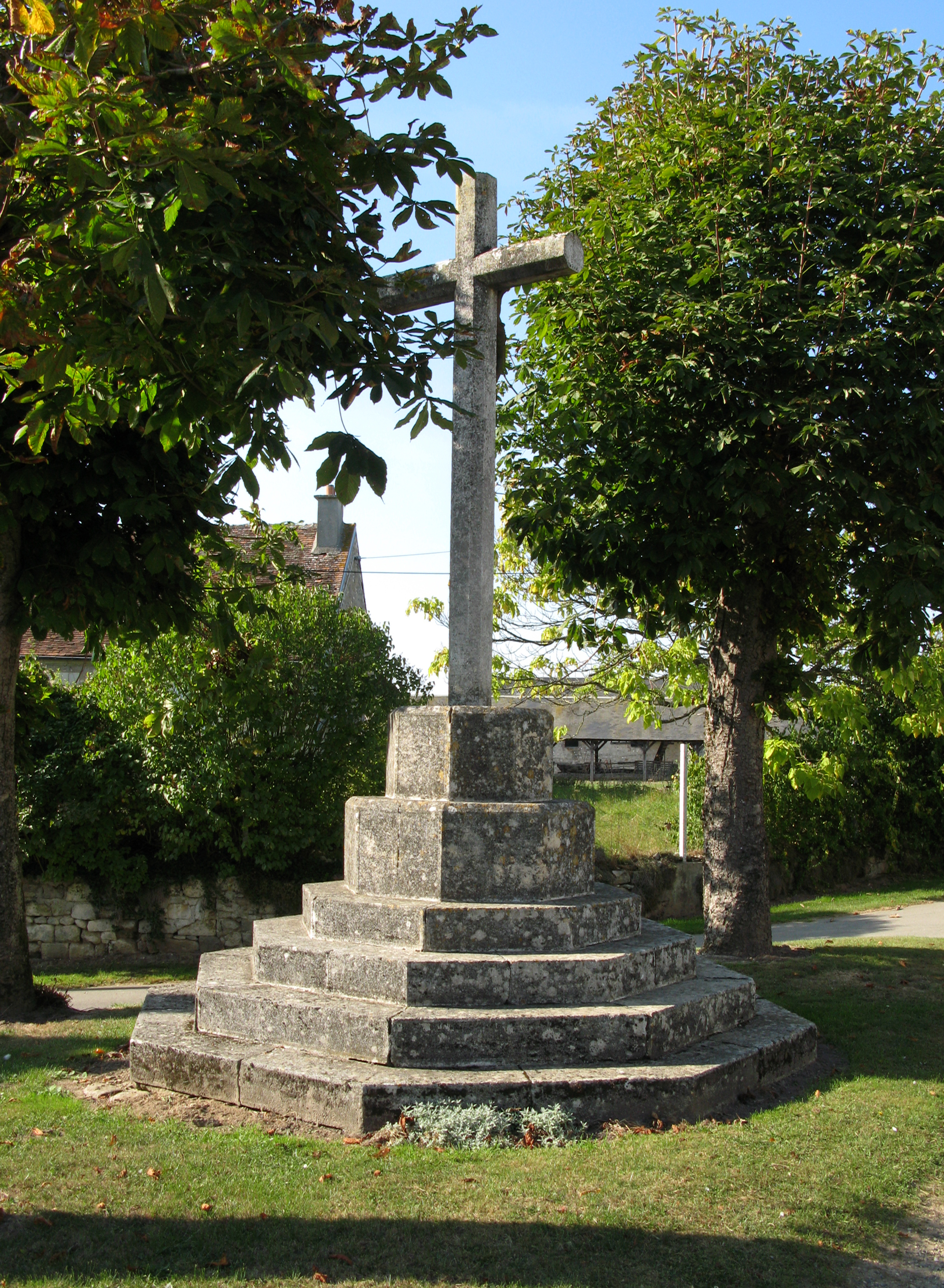
- The calvary of Parcy
- Location of Parcy-et-Tigny
- Location within France Location within Hauts-de-France
- Coordinates: 49°16′46″N 3°20′09″E
- Country: France
- Region: Hauts-de-France
- Department: Aisne
- Arrondissement: Soissons
- Canton: Villers-Cotterêts
- Intercommunality: Oulchy le Château

Government
  - Mayor (2026–32): Frédérique Driviere
- Area^{1}: 10.59 km^{2} (4.09 sq mi)
- Elevation: 140 m (460 ft)
- Highest elevation: 200 m (660 ft)
- Lowest elevation: 105 m (344 ft)
- Population (2023): 245
  - Density: 23.1/km^{2} (59.9/sq mi)
- Time zone: UTC+01:00 (CET)
  - Summer (DST): UTC+02:00 (CEST)
- INSEE/Postal code: 02585 /02210
- ^{1} French Land Register data, which excludes lakes, ponds, glaciers > 1 km^{2} (0.386 sq mi or 247 acres) and river estuaries.

Parcy-et-Tigny (French pronunciation: [paʁsi e tiɲi]) is a commune in the Aisne department in Hauts-de-France in northern France.

== Population ==
Historical population
Year	Pop.	±% p.a.
1968	245	—
1975	216	−1.78%
1982	210	−0.40%
1990	241	+1.74%
1999	243	+0.09%
2007	248	+0.25%
2012	249	+0.08%
2017	256	+0.56%
2023	245	−0.73%
Source: INSEE

== See also ==
- Communes of the Aisne department
