= Noël Ballay =

French explorer and colonial administrator (1847–1902)

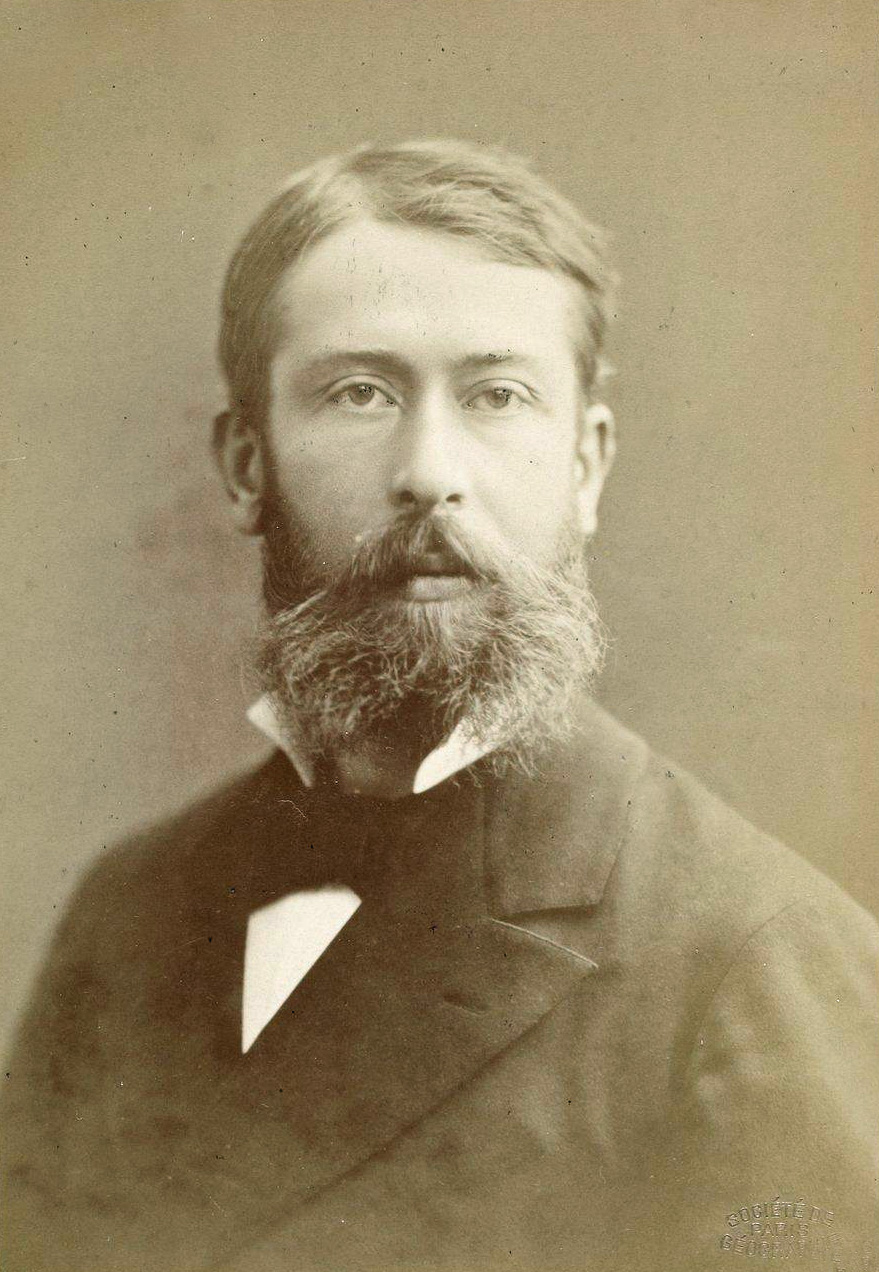
- Photograph of Noël Ballay by Nadar, 1878

Lieutenant governor of Gabon
- In office 1886–1889

Governor of French Guinea
- In office 1891 – November 1900

Governor-General of French West Africa
- In office 1 November 1900 – 26 January 1902
- Preceded by: Jean-Baptiste Chaudié
- Succeeded by: Ernest Roume

Personal details
- Born: Noël Eugène Ballay; 14 July 1847 Fontenay-sur-Eure
- Died: 26 January 1902 (aged 54) Saint-Louis, Senegal
- Profession: Doctor

Noël Eugène Ballay (14 July 1847 – 26 January 1902) was a French auxiliary doctor of the French navy, and a poet. He was an explorer and colonial administrator, the second Governor-General of French West Africa.

== Early years ==
Noël Ballay was born at Fontenay-sur-Eure on 14 July 1847, the younger son of a farm worker. He attended church schools at Bonneval and then Chartres, then a lay college, graduating as a bachelor in letters in 1864 and in science in 1865. He then became a student at the Faculty of Medicine in Paris. During the 1870 Franco-Prussian War he enlisted in the National Guard of Eure-et-Loir, where he was promoted to sergeant major, fought at Fréteval and later fought for the Paris Commune. After peace was restored he returned to the Faculty of Medicine, and in 1871 started a course as an extern of the Paris hospitals, serving in the Hôpital de la Charité in 1872, the Hôpital Beaujon in 1873 and in St-Antoine with Dr Duplay in 1874.

The French at that time were in a race with Leopold II of Belgium to establish physical occupation of the Congo region. Ballay saw an advertisement by Pierre Savorgnan de Brazza, who was looking for a young doctor to accompany him on a mission of exploration in Equatorial Africa, still a relatively unknown area. He went to meet Brazza in person, and was accepted as medical assistant since he had not completed his course with a thesis, (Note: When Ballay did submit his doctoral thesis in 1880 it drew on his observations during the first Gabon expedition. Among other topics, he noted the most effective way to administer quinine, and observed that syphilis was increasingly rare at greater distances from the coast, indicating it had been brought by the Europeans. The thesis went beyond purely medical topics, and was called "Some words about the Ogooué and Lower Congo and the benefits they offer to trade.") required to qualify as a doctor. In May 1875 Brazza and Ballay left Bordeaux in an officially sponsored voyage to explore the Ogooué River.

== Explorer ==
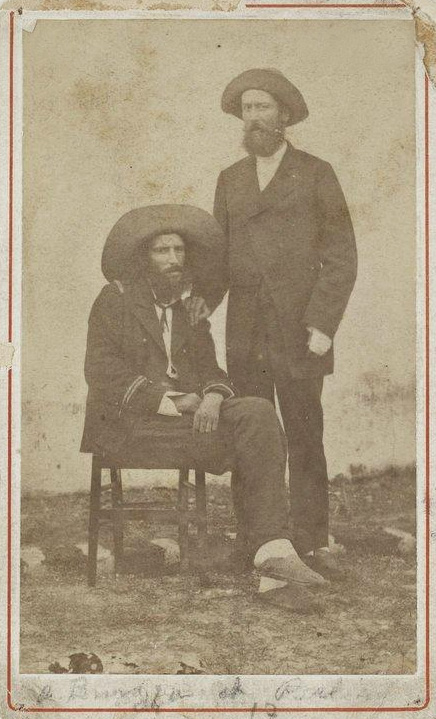
Noël Ballay, standing, beside Pierre Savorgnan de Brazza

The first expedition in what is now Gabon was challenging, a journey of thousands of kilometers from the mouth of the Ogooué through the forest, up into the Batéké Plateau and down to the Congo Basin, where they found the Alima river. They descended this river for two days before turning back, exhausted by three years of fever, illness and hostile local people. They were unaware that the Alima was a tributary of the Congo River. On the return journey the explorers were forced to abandon much of their equipment and the specimens they had collected.

During the expedition, he treated victims of a smallpox epidemic. He also participated in the second expedition, which started in 1879 and was responsible for transporting the components of a steamboat from France to Gabon. Due to delays and damage, he did not reach Brazza until June 1883 at Diélé, near Franceville. He represented France at the Berlin Conference in 1885.

== Administrator ==
In 1886 Ballay was appointed lieutenant governor of Gabon, but due to disagreements over Brazza's management of the colony he resigned in 1889. This break would prove permanent since Chavannes was unable to get the two men to overcome their quarrel. On 2 July 1890, he was a delegate from France at the International Conference of Brussels for the abolition of slavery. In 1891 he became the first Governor of French Guinea, based in Conakry, and began attempts to improve sanitation in the region, particularly in estuaries of the country of the Baga people. Ballay twice was acting governor of French West Africa during the absence of Governor-General Jean-Baptiste Chaudié, from 15 July to 2 October 1987 and from 28 July to 13 November 1898.

At the turn of the century, Senegal was decimated by an epidemic of yellow fever, fatal to many Europeans. The Governor General of French West Africa, Jean-Baptiste Chaudié, returned to France after catching the disease. Doctor Ballay left Guinea for Senegal to help fight against the scourge. He was appointed Governor General on 1 November 1900. He soon became ill in turn, and he died in St. Louis on 26 January 1902. He "died of a fever which was not diagnosed, since there was no longer a doctor in St. Louis qualified to do so". He was given a state funeral on 4 March 1902, celebrated in Chartres Cathedral, and was buried in Fontenay-sur-Eure.

Ernest Roume succeeded Ballay as Governor-General of French West Africa after Victor Lanrezac was acting governor from 19 April until 26 October 1901, followed by Pierre Capest as acting governor from 26 January 1902 to 15 March 1902.

== Legacy ==
In 1906 a special stamp was issued in the Upper Senegal and Niger series. Several highways are named after him in Paris and Chartres.
