= Joseph Desmazes =

French politician

Joseph Gustave Desmazes
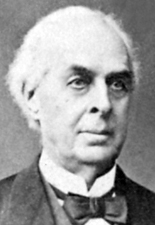

Senator of Martinique
- In office 27 February 1876 – 22 September 1882
- Succeeded by: Vincent Allègre

Personal details
- Born: 16 November 1806 Saint-Pierre, Martinique, France
- Died: 22 September 1882 (aged 75) Paris, France
- Occupation: Naval commissioner, Senator

Joseph Gustave Desmazes (16 November 1806 – 22 September 1882) was a French naval commissioner who was Senator of Martinique from 1876 to 1882.

== Naval career ==
Joseph Gustave Desmazes was born in Saint-Pierre, Martinique on 16 November 1806. His father was Joseph Desmazes (1746–1842), a naval commissioner. He joined the French Navy on 15 June 1819 and was commissioned on 26 December 1826. He became a sub-commissioner on 22 June 1840, deputy commissioner on 23 December 1847 and commissioner on 25 May 1853. He was named ordonnateur (head of administration) of Guadeloupe on 25 May 1853. He was interim governor in Martinique, then in turn in Guyana, Reunion and Guadeloupe. He was acting governor of Guadeloupe from 26 February 1864 to 23 April 1864.

In 1848 Desmazes married a creole from Martinique. Desmazes was made a Knight of the Legion of Honour in 1848, Officer on 18 September 1860 and Commander on 4 January 1870. He retired as commissioner-general in 1870. He became a municipal councillor at Fort-de-France, and president of the General Council of Martinique, where he represented the canton of Mouillage.

== Senator ==
On 27 February 1876, Desmazes was elected Senator of Martinique by 36 votes out of 44. His election was sponsored by Victor Schœlcher. He sat with the Republican left. He refused the dissolution of the chamber demanded by the Broglie-Fourtou ministry in 1877, and supported the Republican ministries that followed. He was reelected in the triennial renewal of 5 January 1879 by 37 of 43 votes and again sat with the Republicans in the Senate. He died of an attack of apoplexy (stroke) in Paris on 22 September 1882.

== Sources ==
- Cahoon, Ben, "Guadeloupe", Worldstatesmen
- Garric, Alain, "M Joseph Gustave DESMAZES", Geneanet (in French)
- "Informations", Journal de Loiret (in French), 26 September 1882
- Le Figaro (1876), Sénateurs et Députés: silhouettes à la plume (in French), au Journal Le Figaro
- Robert, Adolphe; Cougny, Gaston (1889–1891), "DESMAZES (JOSEPH-GUSTAVE)", in Edgar Bourloton (ed.), Dictionnaire des Parlementaires français (1789–1889) (in French)
