= Paul Symphor =

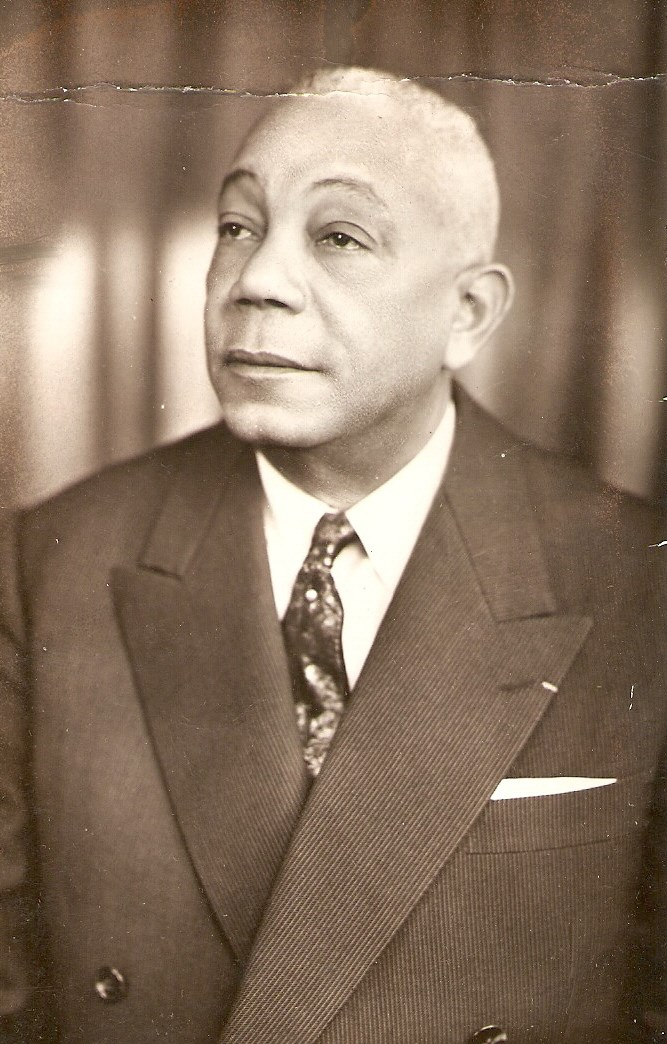
Paul Symphor

Paul Symphor (August 7, 1893 in Martinique – March 27, 1968 in Paris) was a politician from Martinique who served in the French Senate from 1948–1958.
