= François Ducuing =

French journalist and politician (1817–1875)

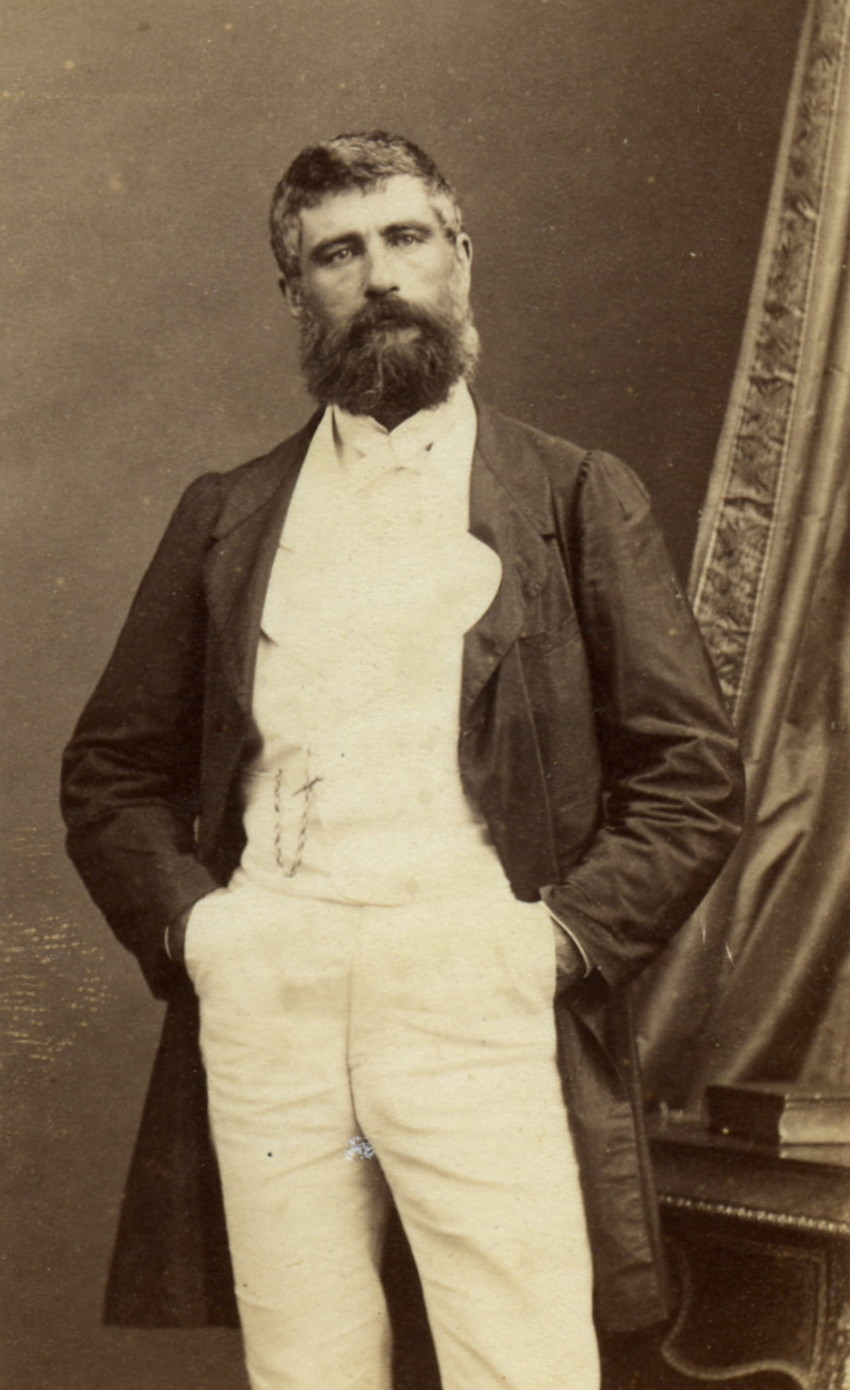
- Born: 23 May 1817; Izaux, Hautes-Pyrénées, France
- Died: 2 October 1875 (aged 58); Asnières, Hauts-de-Seine, France
- Occupations: Journalist, politician

François Ducuing (23 May 1817 – 2 October 1875) was a French journalist and politician. He served as a member of the National Assembly from 1871 to 1875, representing Hautes-Pyrénées. He belonged to the Centre gauche parliamentary group.
