= Fontenay-sur-Eure =

- Commune
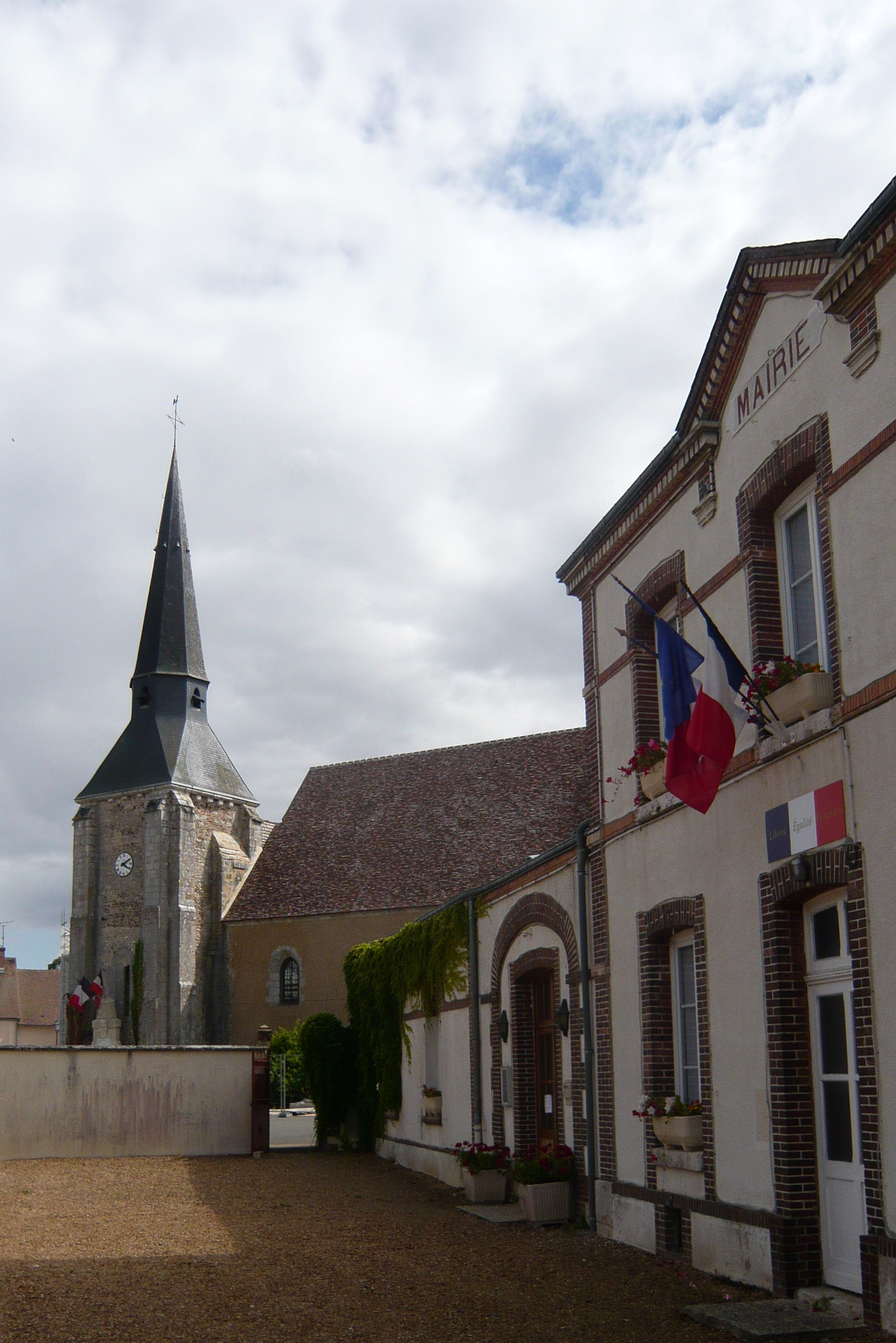
- The town hall and church in Fontenay-sur-Eure
- Location of Fontenay-sur-Eure
- Location within France Location within Centre-Val de Loire
- Coordinates: 48°23′50″N 1°24′27″E
- Country: France
- Region: Centre-Val de Loire
- Department: Eure-et-Loir
- Arrondissement: Chartres
- Canton: Lucé
- Intercommunality: CA Chartres Métropole

Government
  - Mayor (2020–2026): Michel Charpentier
- Area^{1}: 13.8 km^{2} (5.3 sq mi)
- Elevation: 22 m (72 ft)
- Highest elevation: 161 m (528 ft)
- Lowest elevation: 135 m (443 ft)
- Population (2023): 1,206
  - Density: 87.4/km^{2} (226/sq mi)
- Time zone: UTC+01:00 (CET)
  - Summer (DST): UTC+02:00 (CEST)
- INSEE/Postal code: 28158 /28630
- ^{1} French Land Register data, which excludes lakes, ponds, glaciers > 1 km^{2} (0.386 sq mi or 247 acres) and river estuaries.

Fontenay-sur-Eure (French pronunciation: [fɔ̃tnɛ syʁ œʁ], literally Fontenay on Eure) is a commune in the Eure-et-Loir department in northern France.

== Population ==
Historical population
Year	Pop.	±% p.a.
1968	364	—
1975	495	+4.49%
1982	571	+2.06%
1990	669	+2.00%
1999	708	+0.63%
2007	817	+1.81%
2012	838	+0.51%
2017	1,016	+3.93%
2023	1,206	+2.90%
Source: INSEE

== See also ==
- Communes of the Eure-et-Loir department
