= François Joseph Clozel =

French colonial administrator

Marie François Joseph Clozel
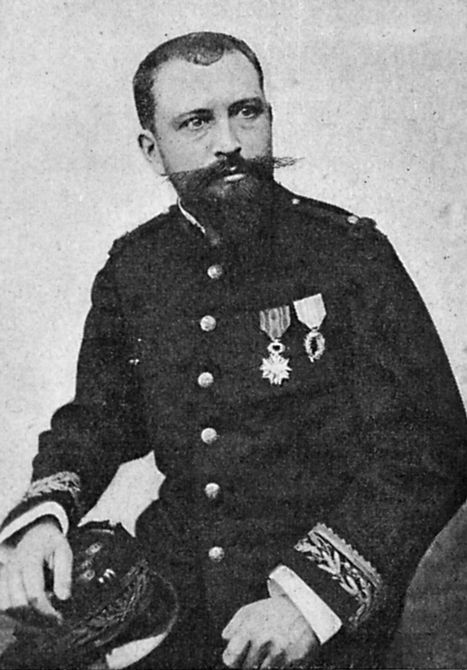
- François Clozel c. 1902

Governor General of French West Africa
- In office 14 June 1915 – 3 June 1917
- Preceded by: William Merlaud-Ponty
- Succeeded by: Joost van Vollenhoven

Personal details
- Born: 29 March 1860 Annonay, France
- Died: 10 May 1918 (aged 58) Rabat, French protectorate in Morocco

Marie François Joseph Clozel (29 March 1860 – 10 May 1918) was a French colonial administrator who became Governor General of French West Africa. Interested in understanding the region, he took an active part in developing French scientific research in West Africa in collaboration with the anthropologist Maurice Delafosse.

== Biography ==
François Clozel was born on 29 March 1860 in Annonay, in the Ardèche department. He graduated with a diploma in Arabic from the School of Oriental Languages. He completed his military service in a regiment of Zouaves in Algeria. He participated in the mission of Casimir Maistre to the French Congo in 1892. He led an expedition in 1894–95 in the north of this country.

In 1896 he was sent to the Ivory Coast. From 25 November 1902 to 4 May 1903 he was acting governor, before being appointed governor on 19 November 1905. After a short interlude when Albert Anatole Nebout held office, he resumed his place as governor from 27 October 1906 to 25 April 1908. His name is associated with the construction of the railway in Côte d'Ivoire.

On 18 February 1908, when William Merlaud-Ponty became Governor General of French West Africa, François Clozel replaced him as governor of the French Sudan. He was Acting Governor General of French West Africa from January to August 1912 under Ponty. On the death of the latter, he fully succeeded him, holding office from 14 June 1915 to 3 June 1917.

Clozel was interested in the indigenous peoples, and encouraged his subordinates to study local customs. With a very different attitude from Ponty, he tried to establish cooperative relations with the African leaders. He was the author of several ethnographic studies, and in 1912 he directed the publication of a series of works by Maurice Delafosse entitled Haut Sénégal-Niger, for which he wrote the preface. On 11 December 1915, he founded the Committee of Historical and Scientific Studies of French West Africa, of which Delafosse was a member. Clozel was the first governor to take into account ethnological research in his directives. Both in tone and in content, his circulars differ from the usual line of colonial administration.

Captain Joost van Vollenhoven succeeded Clozel at the head of French West Africa on 3 June 1917. François Clozel died suddenly in Rabat on 10 May 1918.

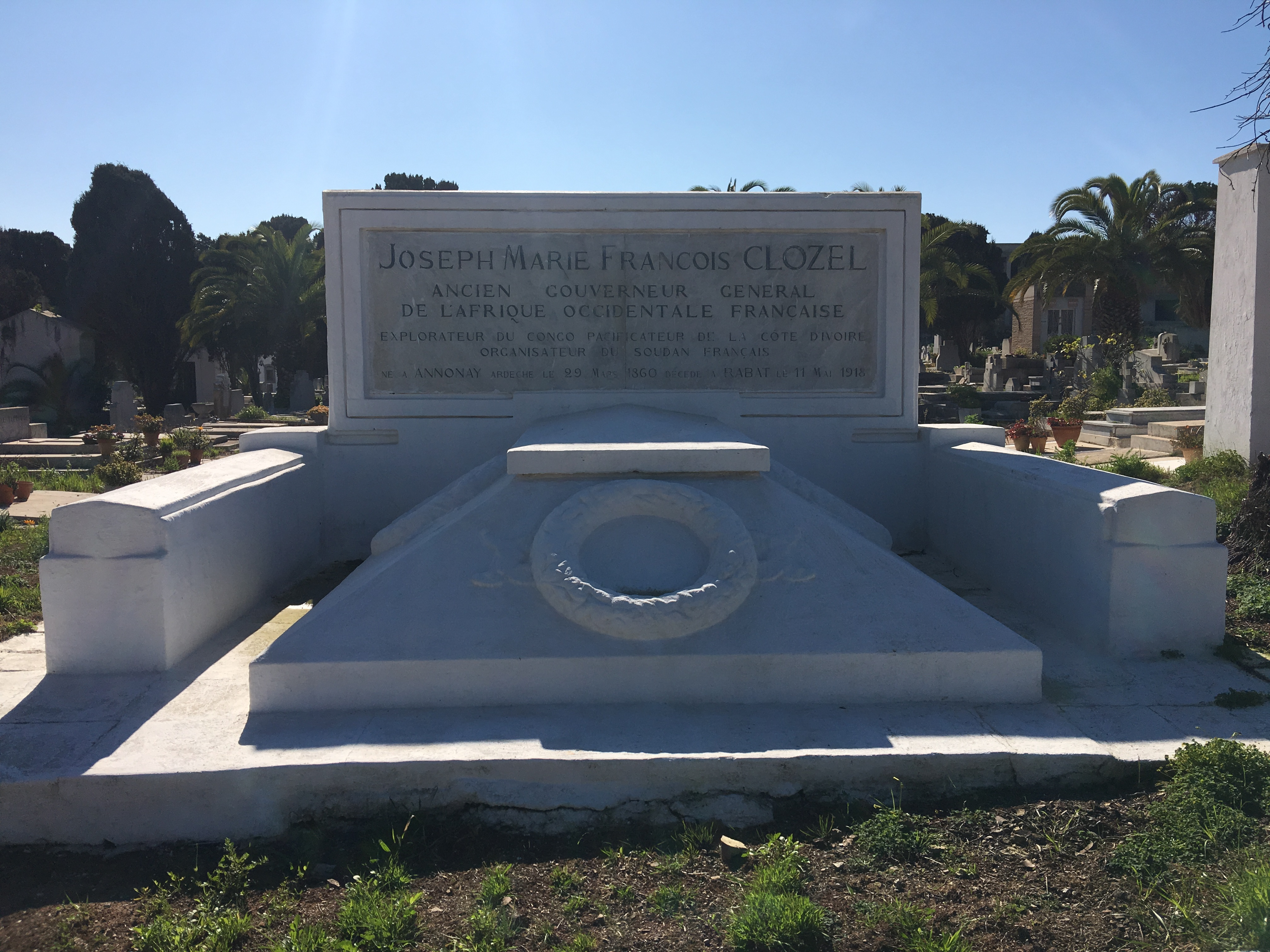
Clozel's tombstone, Christian cemetery, Rabat, Morocco

== Legacy ==
An avenue in Cotonou, Benin, and a boulevard in the Plateau of Abidjan, Ivory Coast, now bear his name. On the square of the Dakar railway station is a monument dedicated in 1923 "to the creators of French West Africa and the glory of the black army". It has - in addition to statues of Demba and Dupont, and of Senegalese troops, medallions of Louis Faidherbe and four prestigious Governors: William Merlaud-Ponty, Joost van Vollenhoven, François Joseph Clozel and Noël Ballay.

== Bibliography ==
- Bibliographie des ouvrages relatifs à la Sénégambie et au Soudan occidental, C. Delagrave, 1891
- Les Bayas : notes ethnographiques & linguistiques : Haute-Sangha, bassin du Tchad, J. André & Cie, 1896
- Les coutumes indigènes de la Côte d'Ivoire : Documents publiés avec une introduction et des notes. Carte ethnographique de la Côte d'Ivoire, A. Challamel, Paris, 1902
- Dix ans à la Côte d'Ivoire, A. Challamel, Paris, 1906, 350 p.
- "Lettres de Korbous", Bulletin du Comité de l'Afrique française, XXIII, 1923, 2, pp. 60–61, 3, pp. 106–108, 4, pp. 149–152, 5, pp. 182–186

== Sources ==
- Conklin, Alice L. (1997). A Mission to Civilize: The Republican Idea of Empire in France and West Africa, 1895–1930. Stanford University Press. ISBN 0-8047-2999-9.
- Delafosse, Maurice (1912). Haut Sénégal-Niger. 3 volumes: 1: Le pays, les peuples, les langues; 2: L'histoire; 3: Les civilisations.
- Herr, Dr. (1895–96). "Mission Clozel dans le nord du Congo français (1894–1895)". Annales de Géographie. V.
- Vanlande, René (1940). Dakar !. Paris: Peyronnet.
