= Jean-Baptiste Chaudié =

French colonial administrator

Governor-General of French West Africa
- In office 16 June 1895 – 1 November 1900
- Succeeded by: Noël Ballay

Personal details
- Born: 28 February 1853 Salernes
- Died: 5 January 1933 (aged 79) Cotignac
- Profession: Doctor

Jean-Baptiste Chaudié (1853–1933) was a French colonial administrator.

He was the first governor general of French West Africa (AP), established by a decree of 16 June 1895. He governed French West Africa from 16 June 1895 to 1 November 1900. During his term of office, his eventual successor Noël Ballay was twice acting governor, from 15 July to 2 October 1987 and from 28 July to 13 November 1898.

At the turn of the century, Senegal was decimated by an epidemic of yellow fever, fatal to many Europeans. Chaudié returned to France after catching the disease and was replaced by Ballay.
