= Edgard de Trentinian =

French soldier

Louis Edgard de Trentinian
- Born: 25 August 1851; Brest, France
- Died: 24 May 1942 (aged 90); Paris, France
- Occupation: Soldier
- Known for: Movement of troops by taxi
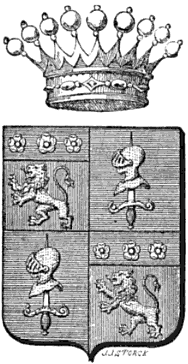

Louis Edgard de Trentinian (25 August 1851 – 24 May 1942) was a French soldier during the colonial era before World War I. He fought in French Indochina, and later was governor of the French Sudan. He commanded troops in the early part of World War I.

== Early years ==
Louis Edgard de Trentinian was born in Brest, France on 25 August 1851, His family was hereditary nobility of Breton origin, with a military tradition. His father Louis-Arthur-Ernest (1822-1885), Count of Trentinian, was a brigadier-general. His grandfather was a commander in the American Revolutionary War. Louis Edgard de Trentinian was raised in Martinique. He fought in the Franco-Prussian War (1870-1871), and was made chevalier de la Légion d’Honneur at the age of nineteen for his valor in the field. He then attended the Ecole Spéciale Militaire de Saint-Cyr, graduating in 1872.

== Indochina ==
On 9 October 1873, second lieutenant Trentinian was in charge of a detachment of marine infantry with two sergeants and twenty eight corporals and soldiers that was dispatched to Tonkin. He served under Francis Garnier, and participated in the successful attack on the Hanoi Citadel, which he entered at Garnier's side. Using steam-powered gunboats for transport, he was involved in various military actions as the French attempted to consolidate their control in Tonkin. These efforts were temporarily abandoned after the death of Garnier on 21 December 1873. On 3 January he was ordered to evacuate the town of Hai Duong, despite his protests against abandoning the French allies to the Vietnamese.

He was acting lieutenant governor of Cochinchina from 4 March 1881 to 4 November 1881. He left Indochina in 1892. In 1893 he was appointed colonel.

== Africa ==
On 1 July 1895 Trentinian was made the military and administrative head of the French Sudan (modern Mali). During his term of office he had to deal with attacks by the Tuaregs from the north. The French occupied Ouagadougou and defeated Samori Ture, founder of the founder of the Wassoulou Empire. Samori was taken prisoner, and in September 1898 Trentinian announced that due to the clemency of the French government he would be deported to Gabon. The French forces went on to take Timbuktu and suppressed a revolt in Macina.

Trentinian also oversaw establishment of regional structures, construction of a railway linking Sudan to Senegal, and development of agriculture and rural crafts. The reporter and traveler Félix Dubois obtained his support to establish a commercial trucking service in the colony. Trentinian agreed that the colony would improve the road between Toukoto and Bamako at its own expense. On 16 December 1898 the first truck was landed at Kayes in a ceremony attended by Trentinian.

== Later career ==
In 1898 Trentinian was made Brigadier and transferred to Madagascar. He left Africa in 1899. In World War I he helped repel the German advance on Paris, leading troops to the front in taxis. He was dismissed due to the number of his soldiers that died at Ethe. He died in Paris on 24 May 1942. The Place des Généraux-de-Trentinian in Paris' quartier de la Porte-Dauphine, was renamed 1994 in honor of father and son.

== Bibliography ==
- Louis Edgard de Trentinian (1900). Réformes nécessaires dans nos possessions de l'Afrique Occidentale: le Soudan et nos colonies côtieres (Sénégal, Guinée, Côte d'Ivoire, Dahomey). Hemmerlé.
- Louis Edgard de Trentinian (1927). L'État-Major en 1914 et la 7e Division du 4e Corps; Trentinian, [Louis Edgard] de, Général; 10 août au 22 sept. 1914. Fournier.
