= Paul Ducuing =

French sculptor (1867–1949)

- Born: 30 April 1867; Lannemezan, Hautes-Pyrénées, France
- Died: 9 March 1949 (aged 81); Toulouse, France
- Education: École des Beaux-Arts de Toulouse; École nationale supérieure des Beaux-Arts
- Occupation: Sculptor
- Spouse: Countess François de Simard de Pitra

Paul Ducuing (30 April 1867 – 9 March 1949) was a French sculptor.

== Early life ==
Paul Ducuing was born on 30 April 1867 in Lannemezan, south-western France. His father was a farmer. He graduated from the École des Beaux-Arts in Toulouse and the École nationale supérieure des Beaux-Arts in Paris.

== Career ==
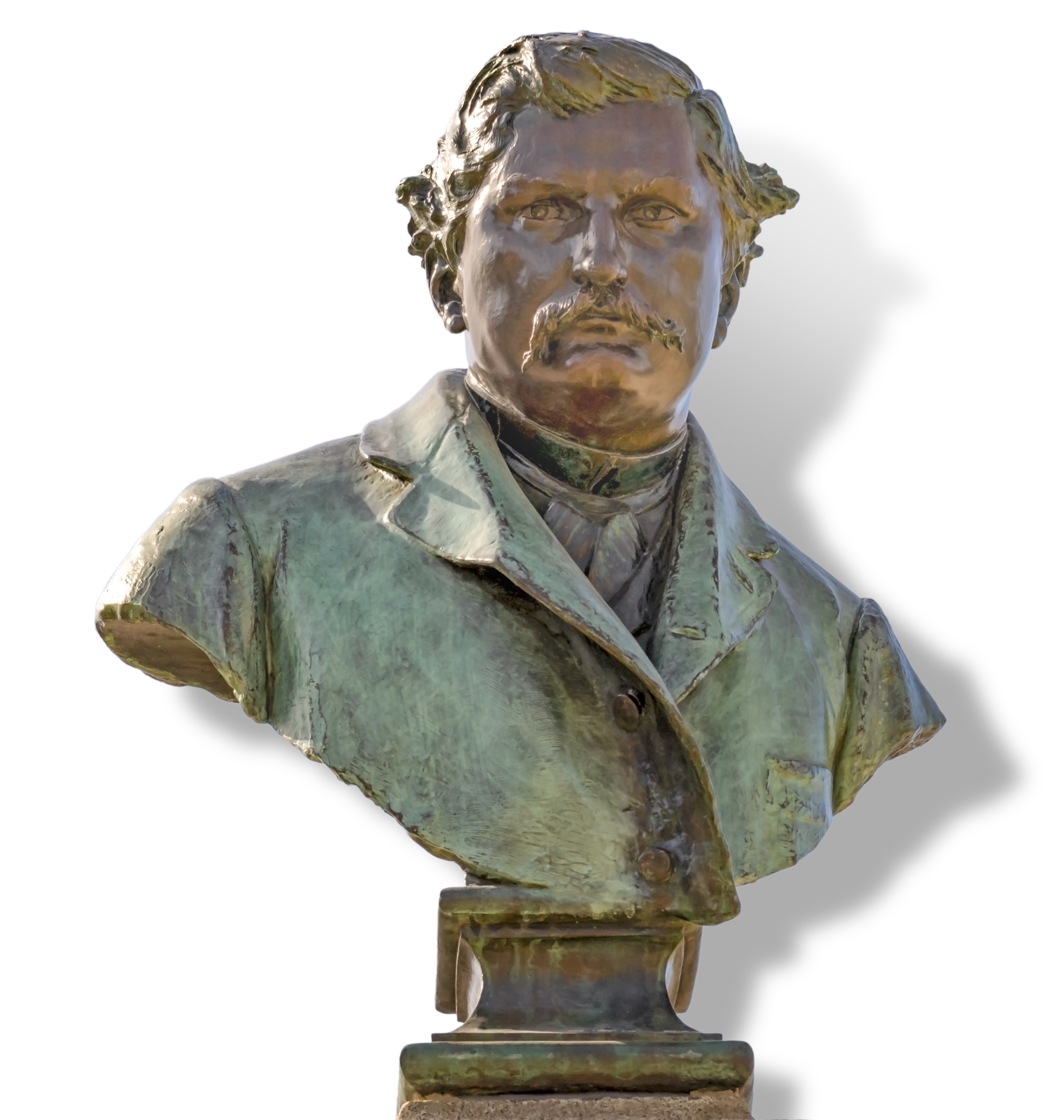
Omer Sarraut (1905) Square André Chénier Carcassonne

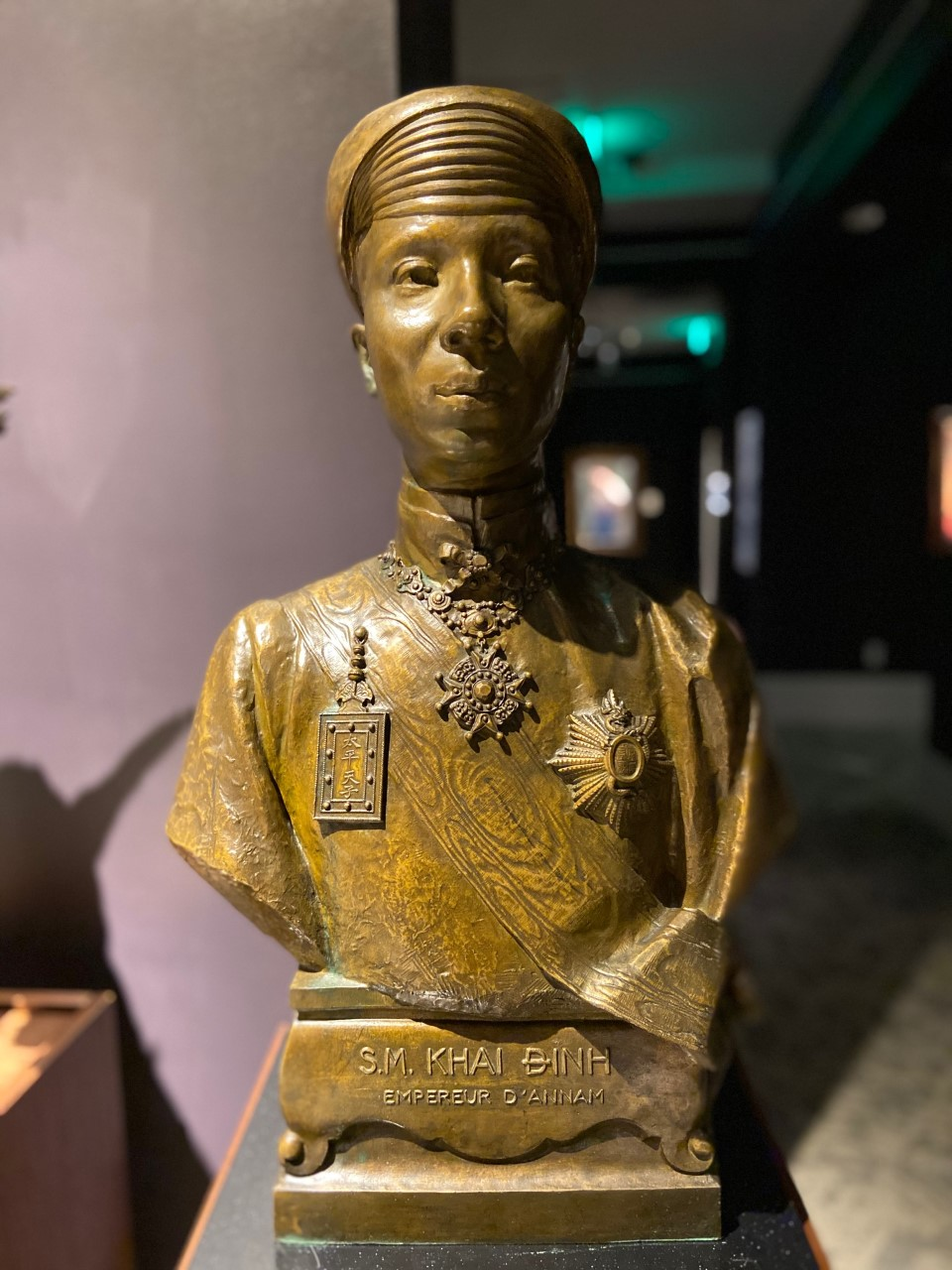
Bust of S.M. Khai Dinh, Emperor of Annam by Paul Ducuing

Ducuing exhibited his sculptures at the Salon, where he won medals in 1898, 1901 and 1906. He became a professor of sculpture at the Manufacture nationale de Sèvres in 1919. On top of teaching, he designed Sèvres figurines.

Ducuing designed public sculptures. For example, he designed Jéliotte in the Parc Beaumont in Pau in 1901. He also designed Monument à Françoise de Cezelli in Leucate. Additionally, he designed a statue of Jean Jaurès in Albi. He designed several sculptures in Carcassonne. He also designed World War I monuments in Castelsarrasin, Valence-d'Agen and Saint-Gaudens. He designed three sculptures in Toulouse, all of which are no longer there.

Ducuing was awarded the Legion of Honour.

== Personal life and death ==
Ducuing married Countess François Simard de Pitray, the widow of Antonin Mercié, in 1922. He died on 9 March 1949 in Toulouse.
