= Gymnastic and Sports Federation of French Patronages =

French multi-sports federation established in 1898

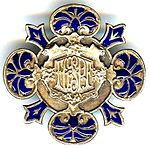
- Sport: Gymnastics, football, basketball
- Membership: 13 in 1898; 1,504 in 1914
- Abbreviation: FGSPF
- Founded: 1898
- Headquarters: 5 place Saint-Thomas-d’Aquin, Paris
- President: Paul Michaux (1898–1923), François Hébrard (1923–1947)
- Closure date: 1947

The Gymnastic and Sports Federation of French Patronages (in French, Fédération gymnastique et sportive des patronages de France, FGSPF) is a French multi-sports federation established in 1898 in Paris by Dr. Paul Michaux. Initially known as the Union of Gymnastics and Military Instruction Societies of French Patronages and Youth Organizations, it changed its name to the Federation of Catholic Gymnastics Societies in 1901 before adopting its current name in 1903. During the Occupation, it integrated the women's organization of the Women's Sports Rayon. It formally merged with it in 1947, evolving into the Sports Federation of France and later the Sports and Cultural Federation of France in 1968.

The FGSPF, as indicated by its acronyms, is primarily a gymnastics federation, competing with the Union of Gymnastics Societies of France. The latter is closely associated with the League of Patriots and the Ligue de l'enseignement (League of Education), both of which promote secular or even anti-clerical values. The FGSPF also competes with the Union of French Athletic Sports Societies, especially when it expands its focus to include other sports, especially football. This sport quickly became the reference sport for the FGSPF, leading to the organization of the FGSPF Football Championship from 1904 to 1914. In 1908, the FGSPF successfully established the French Interfederal Committee, created a year earlier, as the sole federation recognized by the International Federation of Association Football.

The emergence of specialized sports federations after World War I did not seem to pose any problems for the FGSPF, unlike the USFSA, which disappeared from the national scene. The FGSPF even experienced exceptional growth during this period, especially in basketball.

== History ==
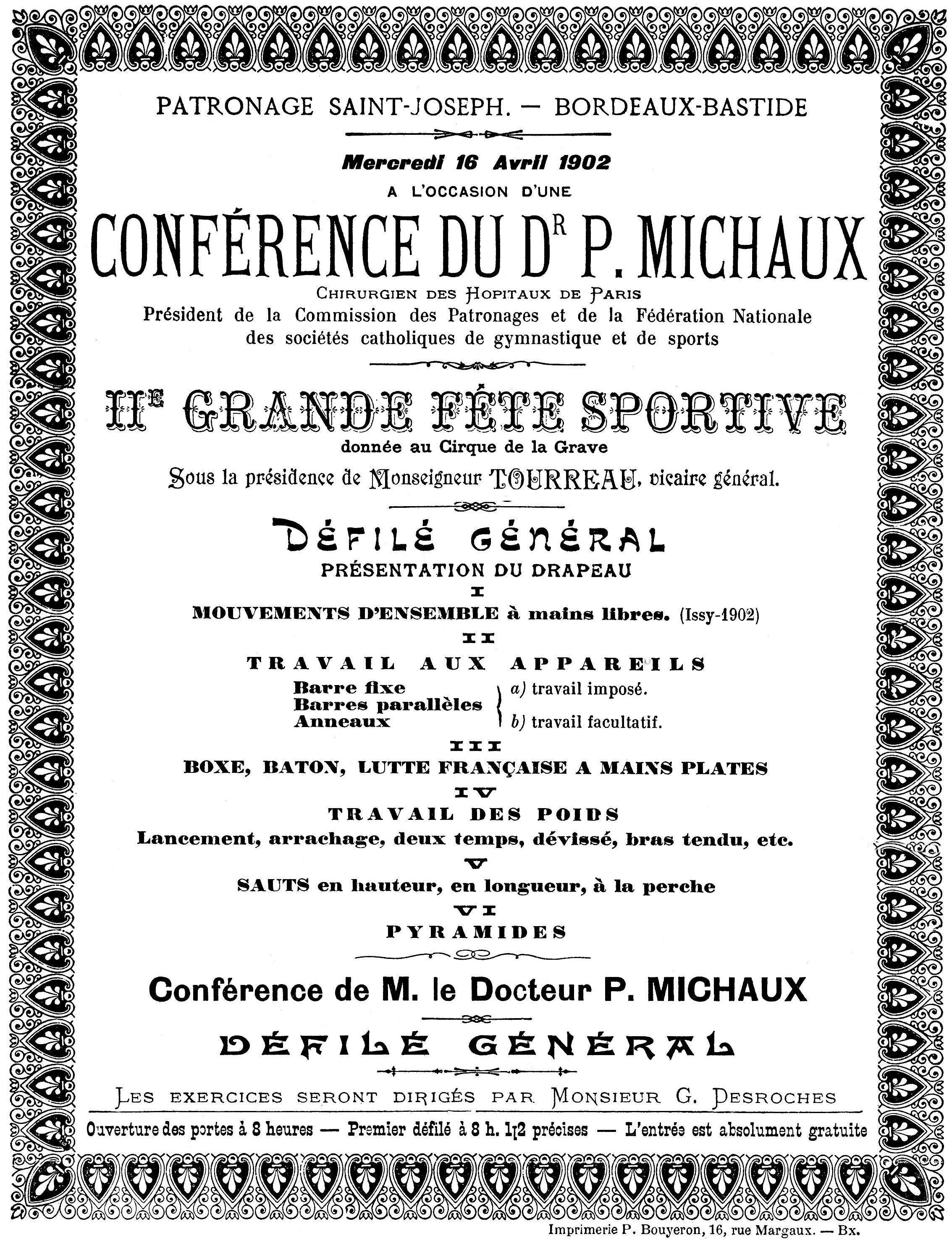
Lecture by Dr Paul Michaux on April 16, 1902, in Bordeaux.

In 1891, Pope Leo XIII's encyclical Rerum novarum legitimized and strengthened Catholic parish patronages, which established a tradition of running, ball games, stilts, and later gymnastics for nearly a century. Subsequently, anti-clericalism promoted by the Union of Gymnastics Societies of France (USGF) prompted the French episcopate to consider organizing its gymnastic followers into a specific association. During the Patronage Day on December 15, 1897, at the Catholic Institute of Paris, the rector, M^{gr} Péchenard, therefore proposed a physical exercise competition for the diocesan patronages of Paris. The project was embarrassed by the assembly, and Dr. Paul Michaux, along with another doctor, Dr. Fayet, and a few priests, including Father Louis Esquerré, the patronage of the Bon Conseil work in 1894, immediately formed a team to implement the project.

In the following year, (Note: Dreyfus affair year) Dr. Michaux successfully obtained the creation of an organization from the patronage committee, which was later named the Union of Gymnastics and Military Instruction Societies of Patronages and Youth Organizations (USGIMPOJF). This was replaced in October 1901 by the Federation of Catholic Gymnastics Societies (FSCG). The first competition took place on July 24, 1898, in Paris, under the chairmanship of Rear Admiral Mathieu with 3,000 spectators. The second competition, held in June of the following year in Ivry and attended by 1,200 gymnasts, including participants from the North, Le Havre, and Reims, was graced by the presence of Albert Mun. In 1900, the Paris Universal Exposition awarded its Grand Prize for Social Works to a presentation of the new federation by Pierre Griffaton, who was also a co-disciple in the Nazareth work. The fourth competition, in 1901, gathered 2,000 gymnasts and attracted 8,000 spectators.

This institution is dedicated to apostolic, hygienic, and patriotic goals, in line with the ideas of prominent physiologists such as Claude Bernard, Étienne Marey, and Paul Bert, following the aftermath of the French defeat in 1870. Gymnastics, already practiced in patronages since Timon-David, is considered essential for achieving these objectives. Minister Paul Bert assigns it the task of bridging the gap of several years between students leaving compulsory primary school at 13 and their military incorporation. To achieve this, every teacher spends three months at the military gymnastics school of Joinville focusing on fencing and gymnastics.

Gathered from October 25 to 28, 1903, at the Catholic Institute of Paris, the central commission of the patronages of France, then chaired by Dr. Michaux himself, expresses -the wish "that in each region, directors should agree to organize regional or departmental unions of gymnastics and sports societies" and "that the training of members of our Catholic patronages be so manly and strongly Christian that, if necessary, they can participate in gymnastics competitions organized by other societies, even non-denominational ones." Sport also quickly makes its appearance with the consideration of football as early as 1901 and running in 1903. The federation considered this, and on December 14, 1903, it was renamed the Gymnastic and Sports Federation of French Patronages. That same year, the first issue of the journal Les Jeunes is published. In 1904, the federation organized its first cross-country race and federal athletics championship in Saint-Cloud, followed by the first federal congress of the Commission of Patronages. Les Jeunes, initially an insert in the Patronage magazine, became an independent weekly publication in March 1905. The federation relocated to its first premises at 5 Place Saint-Thomas-d’Aquin on July 15, with Léon Lamoureux assuming administrative responsibilities on November 14, later joined by Charles Simon.

=== Gymnastics, Football, War (1898–1918) ===
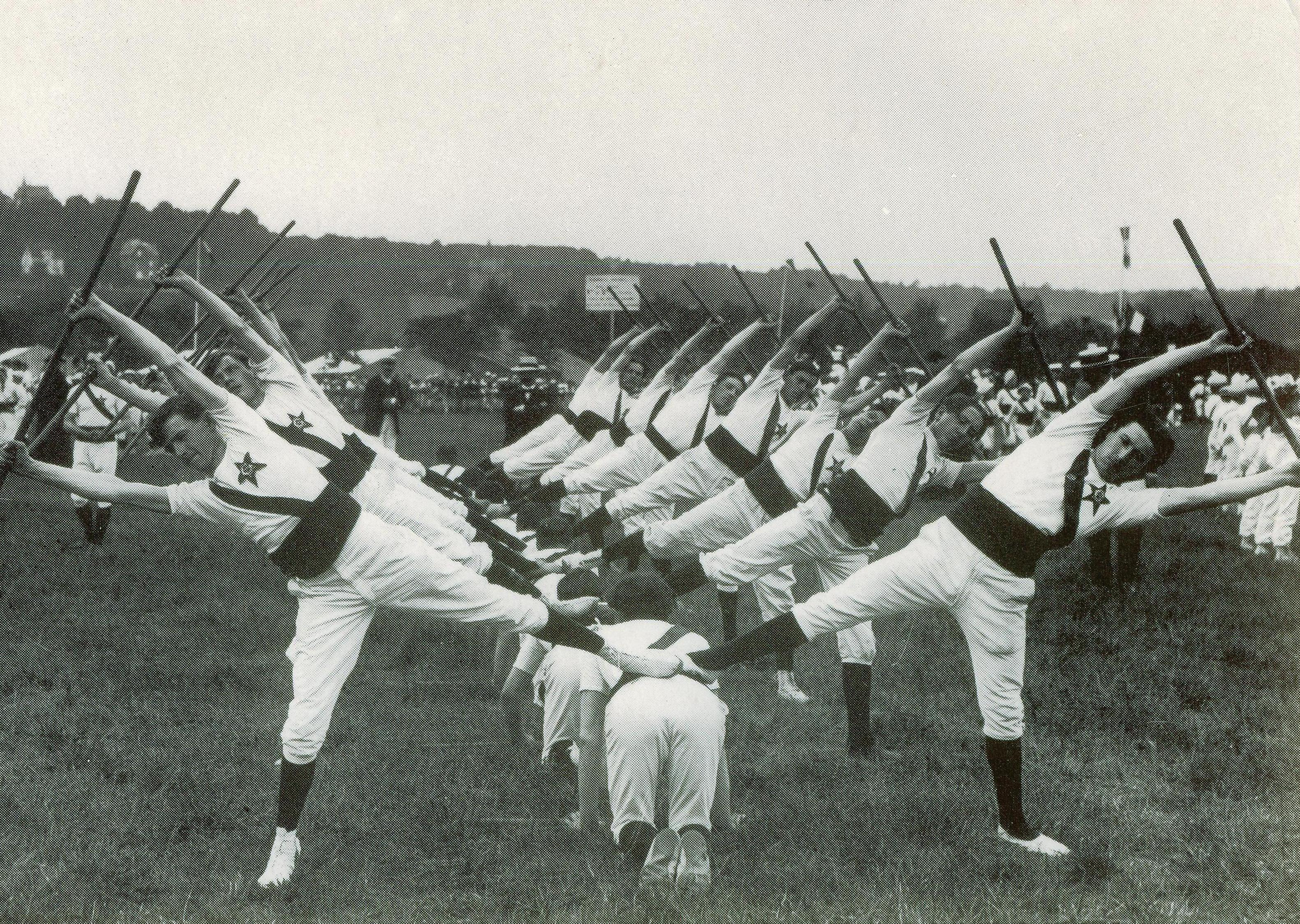
1914 Seine-et-Oise regional competition, champion team.

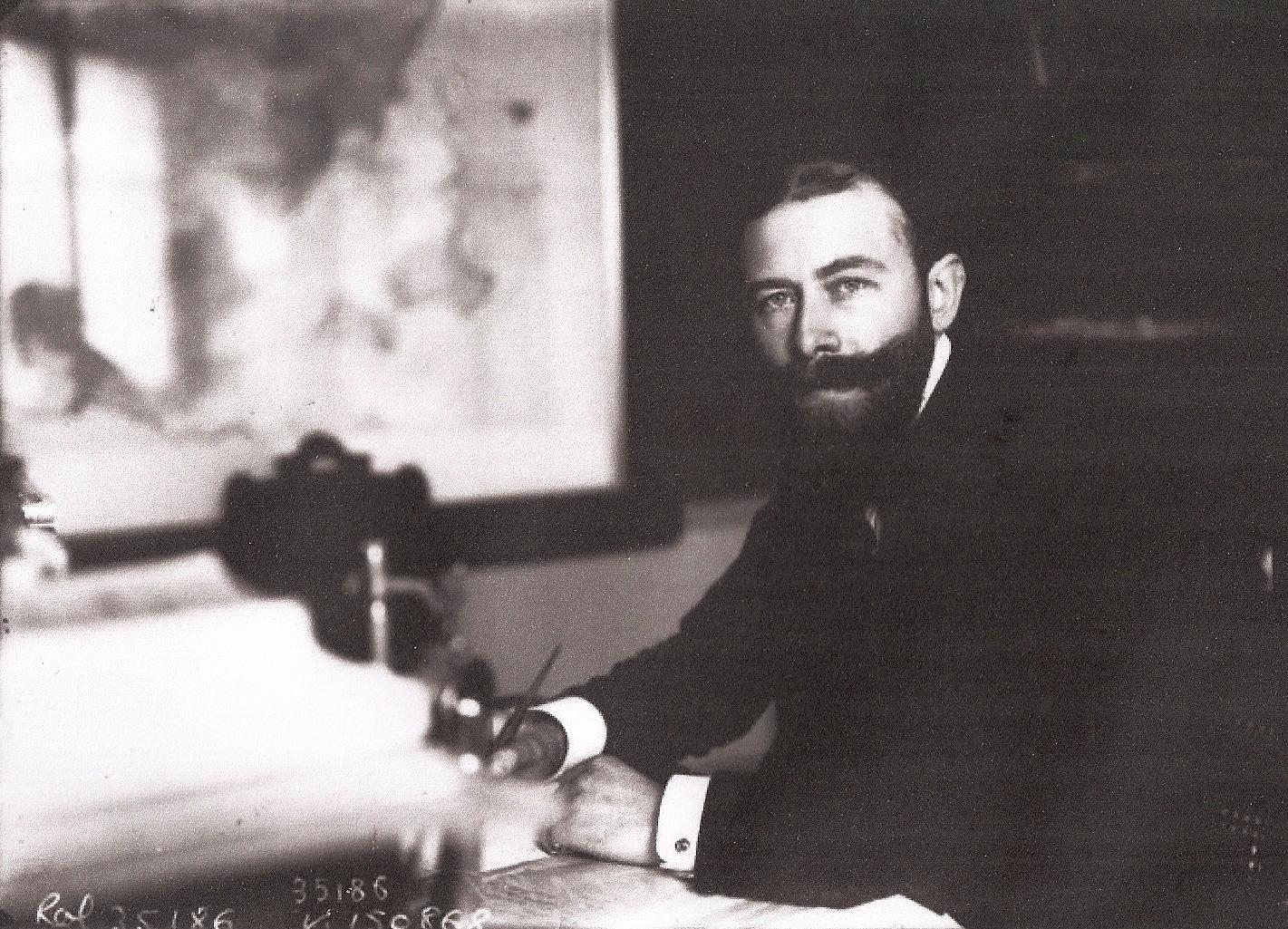
Charles Simon, General Secretary of the FGSPF and founding Chairman of the CFI, in his office at 5, place Saint-Thomas-d'Aquin.

However, gymnastics continued to provide an avenue for Catholics to participate in patriotic events, with large competitions attracting associations from various provinces to Paris. Despite this, the federation's growth remained limited until 1906. The turning point came in 1908 when hostility from authorities and other federations towards associations that had participated in gymnastics competitions in Rome in 1906, in response to the pope's invitation, led to a surge in membership in the FGSPF. For instance, the Lyon region, with its own Federation of Catholic Gymnastics Societies of the Rhône and the southeast, joined that year. (Note: Tranvouez 1999, pp. 227–240) Some associations joined later, possibly due to pressure from their diocese hierarchy, such as the Federation of Gymnastics Societies of the North in 1912.

This situation, which irritates anticlericals, is not without risks. (Note: Tranvouez 1999, p. 157) In September 1904, Father Deschamps' troops escorted Émile Combes, President of the Council, to the Auxerre train station with fanfare, causing annoyance. However, on June 8, 1907, the Saint-Joseph des Épinettes event resulted in one fatality and two serious injuries. The competition in Roubaix on July 11, 1911, attracted 50,000 spectators and 8,000 gymnasts, but also faced opposition from 3,000 anti-clerical protesters, requiring 400 gendarmes to be reinforced by two squadrons of dragoons and two police brigades. It was a war period, and the situation persisted because three weeks before the declaration of the Great War, on July 12, 1914, in Roanne, an enthusiastic prefect mobilized the army and had a parade charged by the mobile guard on the pretext that priests accompanied it. Nevertheless, alliances are multiplying, especially in the provinces, and on October 8, 1910, in Chantilly, a society from Bordeaux, La Flèche, won the first federal gymnastics championship. The following year, 43 regional unions and 1,250 affiliated societies participated in the 9th federal congress.

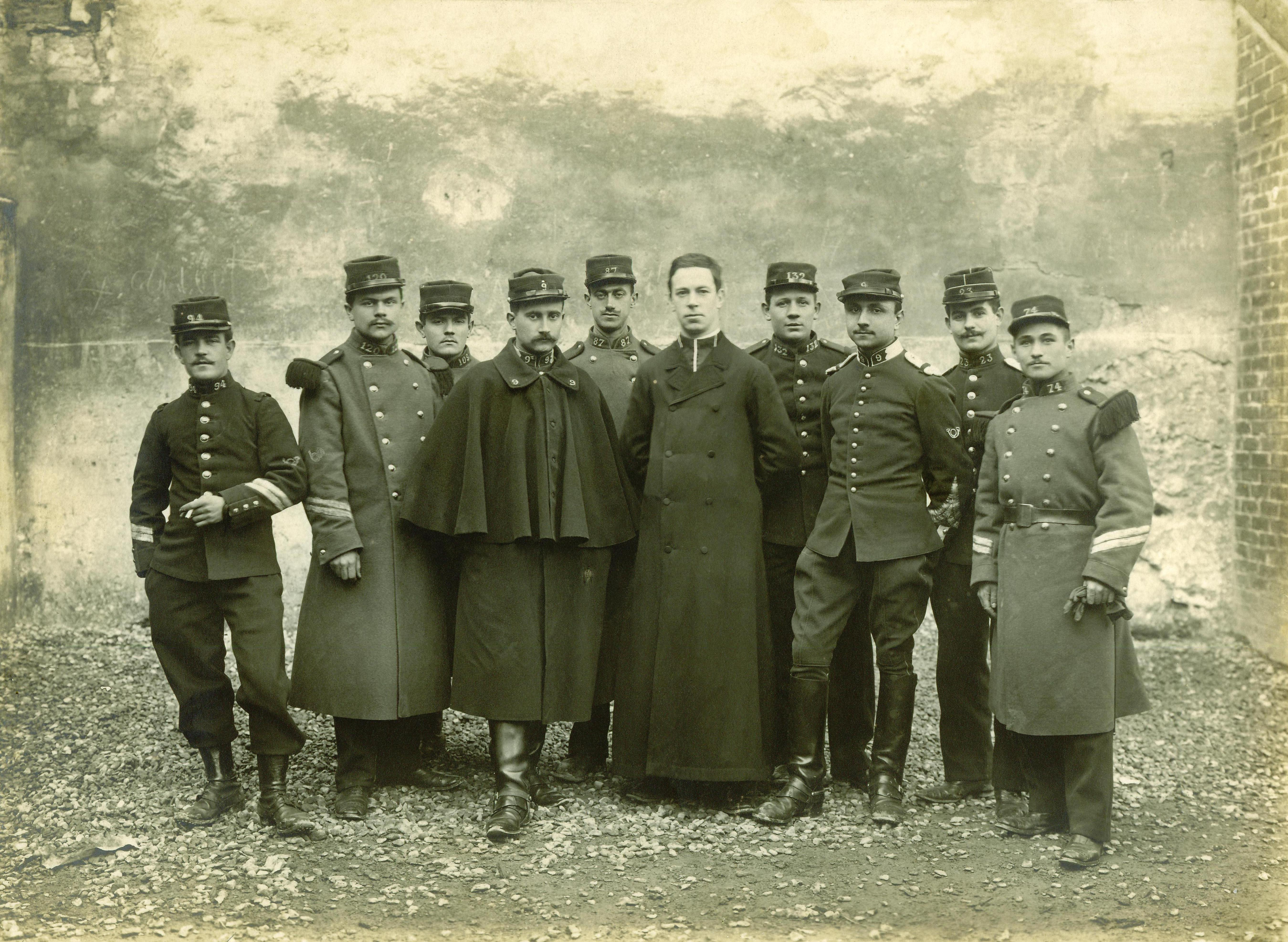
Director of a parish office, surrounded by his furloughed workers in 1916.

In solidarity with the French provinces annexed to Germany, two competitions were organized in Nancy in 1907 and 1911. The second competition saw the participation of societies from Alsace, Belgium, Holland (province of the Netherlands), Ireland, Italy, and Canada. The FGSPF brought together 8,500 athletes in the Lorraine capital during this event. The 25 foreign delegations present established the International Union of Catholic Physical Education Works (UIOCEP), which later evolved into the International Catholic Federation of Physical and Sports Education (FICEP) in 1947. Paul Michaux served as vice president, and Charles Simon as secretary-general. In December 1911, this union convened in Rome to establish its statutes with the encouragement of Pope Pius XI. (Note: Jouaret 1999a, p. 168)

In twelve years, the FGSPF has successfully united most parish and congregation patronages with charitable missions. However, patronages associated with educational institutions catering to the elite have largely remained outside its sphere of influence. The FGSPF aimed to bridge the gap between working-class and educated youth through sports, making it the first French federation to focus on school sports. The Gymnastic and Sports Union of Free Education was established on February 10, 1911, with René Barbier de la Serre, officially declared on March 29, 1911, and later evolved into the General Sports Union of Free Education (UGSEL) in 1935. The conquest of this sector proved laborious, as it had already been largely prospected by the Union des Sociétés Françaises de Sports Athlétiques (USFSA) for over 20 years, as the story of Father Henri Didon and his Albert-le-Grand d'Arcueil institute testifies. The FGSPF, which had 13 affiliated clubs at the end of 1898, registered 1,504 in 1914 compared with 1,100 and 1,700 respectively for its rivals, the USGF and USFSA. Its numbers made it France's leading sports movement, and in the post-war years membership rapidly doubled.

Dr. Michaux, motivated by the desire to reclaim Alsace and Lorraine, made military preparation and marksmanship a top priority for the federation. In 1914, one in three recipients of the Military Aptitude Certificate trained within the FGSPF. The organization suffered the loss of 25,000 members who fell on the battlefield during World War I, including many leaders and priest-directors. By November 1914, Paul Michaux estimated that over 50,000 youth from patronages were serving in the military. Despite the challenges, the FGSPF continued its activities, and Paul Michaux successfully organized the first post-war competition in a major city restored to France: 7,000 gymnasts from across the country gathered in Metz on August 4, 1919.

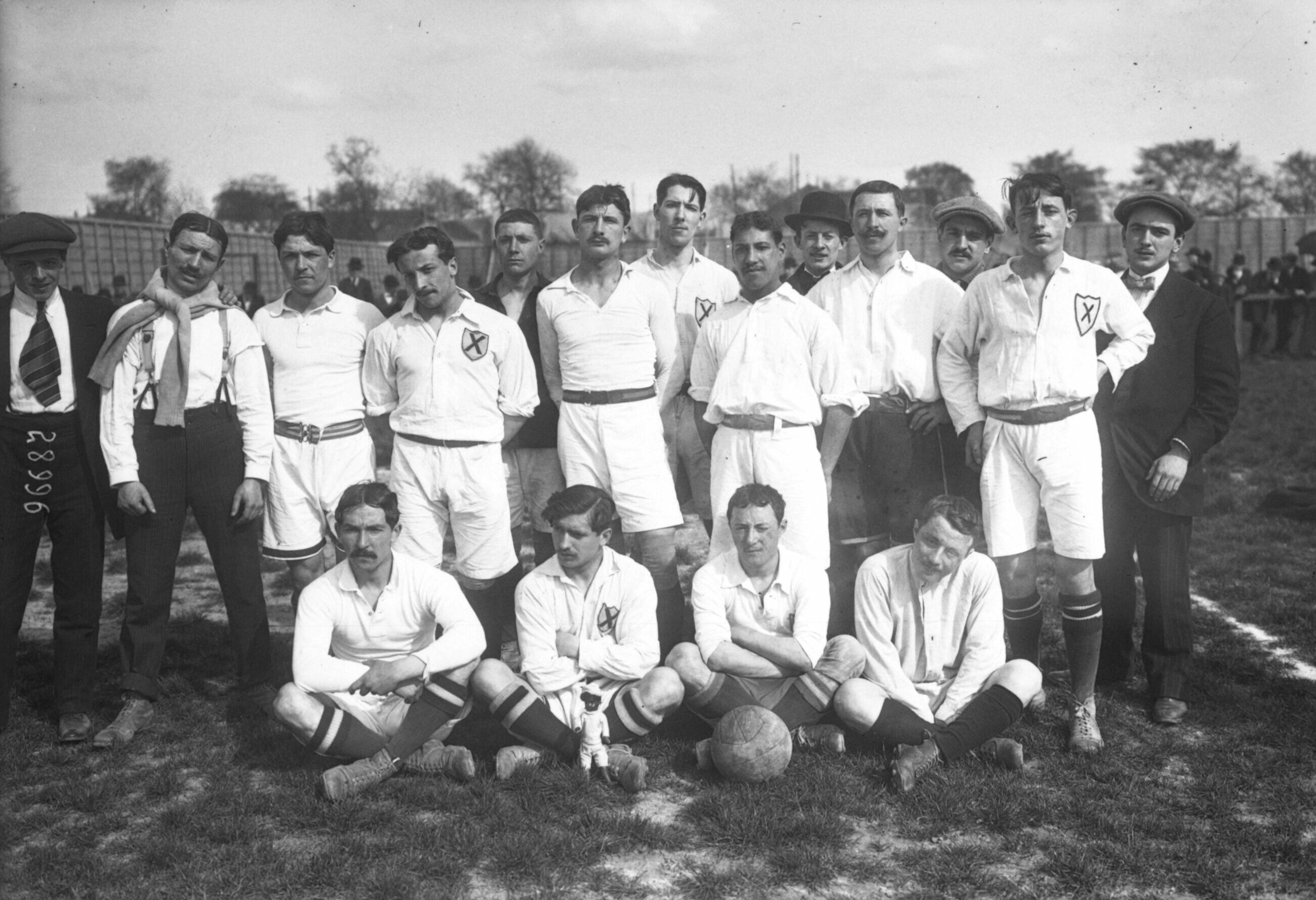
The "bons gars de Bordeaux" (the good boys from Bordeaux), champions of France FGSPF 1909.

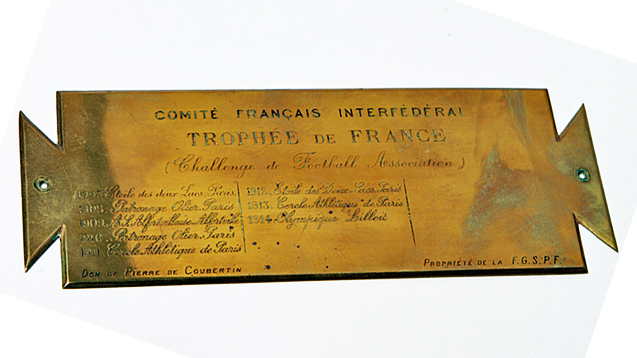
French Trophy plaque/palmares.

The majority of French sports groups, including many patronages and religious school establishments, have long been affiliated with the USFSA, which has specialized commissions for each discipline. While its leaders are passionate about football-rugby, they have been more hesitant towards association football, which is already popular among professional athletes in the UK but is also widely practiced in the courtyards of presbyteries. (Note: Tranvouez 1999, p. 193) The new Federation of Catholic Gymnastics Societies could no longer ignore this sport, as it was mentioned in its January 1900 bulletin and initial meetings were organized the following year. To assert its legitimacy in addressing football, the federation changed its name to the Gymnastic and Sports Federation of French Patronages in 1903. It then organized its own FGSPF Football Championship in the following year, which lasted for ten seasons before being interrupted by the war and eventually faded away in favor of the creation of the Charles Simon Cup in 1917. Only a federal championship persisted after that.

Faced with mounting challenges, the general secretary, Charles Simon, spearheaded the establishment of the French Interfederal Committee (CFI) in 1907. He secured individual memberships from USFSA members who supported football. The inaugural CFI championship in 1907 featured a trophy donated by Pierre de Coubertin. The new memberships were not without motive: the USFSA, after a dramatic exit from the International Association Football Federation (FIFA) in 1908, promptly aligned with the CFI, which became France's sole representative organization. In 1912, the CFI made the strategic decision to focus exclusively on association football.

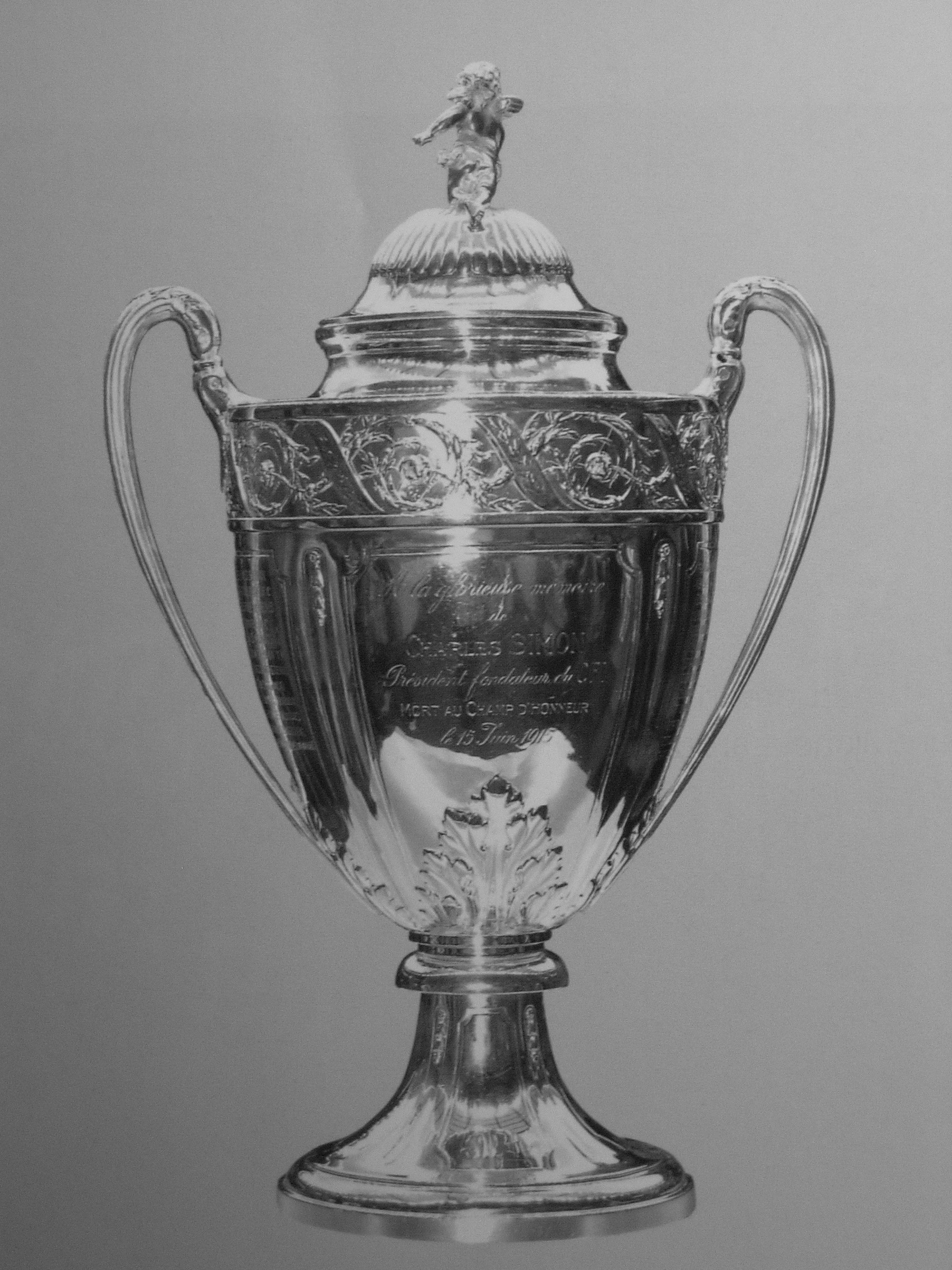
French Football Cup Trophy (Charles Simon Cup).

The headquarters of the CFI remained at the same location as the FGSPF: 5 Place Saint-Thomas-d'Aquin in Paris. On June 15, 1915, Charles Simon passed away while on duty, and Henri Delaunay took over his responsibilities at the FGSPF and the CFI. On January 5, 1917, they decided to honor the fallen hero by naming the French Football Cup after him. The CFI was officially renamed the French Football Federation (FFF) on April 7, 1919, with Jules Rimet as president and Henri Delaunay as general secretary. Delaunay was succeeded at the FGSPF by Armand Thibaudeau, who played a key role in the establishment of the French Federation of Basketball (FFBB).

During the conflict, the FGSPF contributed some of its members to the French army due to their prior military training, while younger members played an active role in the national effort. The FGSPF also provided the Ministry of Agriculture with groups of young urbanites to assist with field work. In Paris, the organization organized teams of stretcher-bearers to help with the reception of wounded soldiers at the city's train stations.

The victory in 1918 came at a cost for the FGSPF, with 24,000 members killed and 60,000 wounded. Two-thirds of its 110,000 members were awarded the Croix de Guerre (War Cross).

=== Basketball, Culture, and the Christian Working Youth (1919–1940) ===
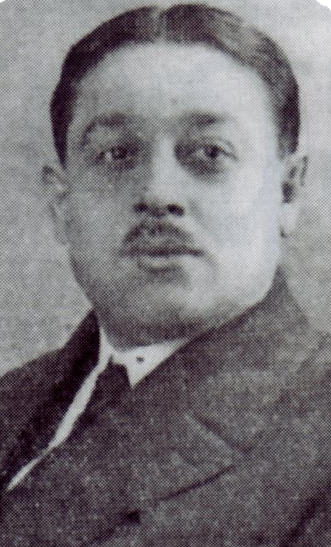
Armand Thibaudeau embodies the role of patronages in basketball.

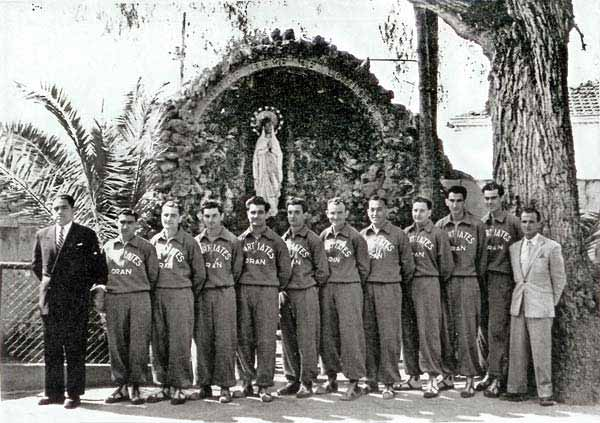
Champions of the French Union in 1949, the Spartiates d'Oran illustrate the success of basketball at the FGSPF and its establishment in North Africa.

After welcoming and integrating the Elsaessicher Turnerbund (ETB) on May 15, 1919, the organization of Catholic gymnastics societies in Alsace, which then took the name Avant-garde du Rhin (AGR), the FGSPF celebrated victory on July 25, 1920, with a grand competition in Metz, the hometown of Paul Michaux, now French again. Over 25,000 young people from the patronages participated in this event, demonstrating their commitment and sacrifice to improve relations with public authorities. On March 20, 1921, Dr. Michaux was honored with the Legion of Honor by Marshal Foch for his outstanding and dedicated service to youth. The FGSPF was officially approved in 1922, and its associations received approvals and subsidies from the Ministry of War, with a focus on gymnastics and military preparation. The 25th anniversary of the FGSPF was celebrated on July 23, 1923, bringing together 28,000 gymnasts and musicians from 600 different associations. Despite some criticism from progressive clergy regarding "war-like sports," (Note: Groeninger 2004, pp. 74, 85, 148–149.) this marked a prosperous era for the federation. It became the leading French sports federation between the decline of the USFSA and the rise of single-sport federations, particularly excelling in football and basketball. By 1928, 1,500 of its 2,500 patronages were approved, and on April 26, it was admitted to the National Sports Committee. The FGSPF played a key role in introducing major innovations during the interwar period, such as sports insurance in 1924, medical certificates in 1930 (Note: Jouaret 1999b, p. 389) initiated by Dr. Récamier, and popular sports certificates for football and basketball athletes. Despite the passing of Paul Michaux in 1923 and his replacement by François Hébrard, the federation continued its momentum.

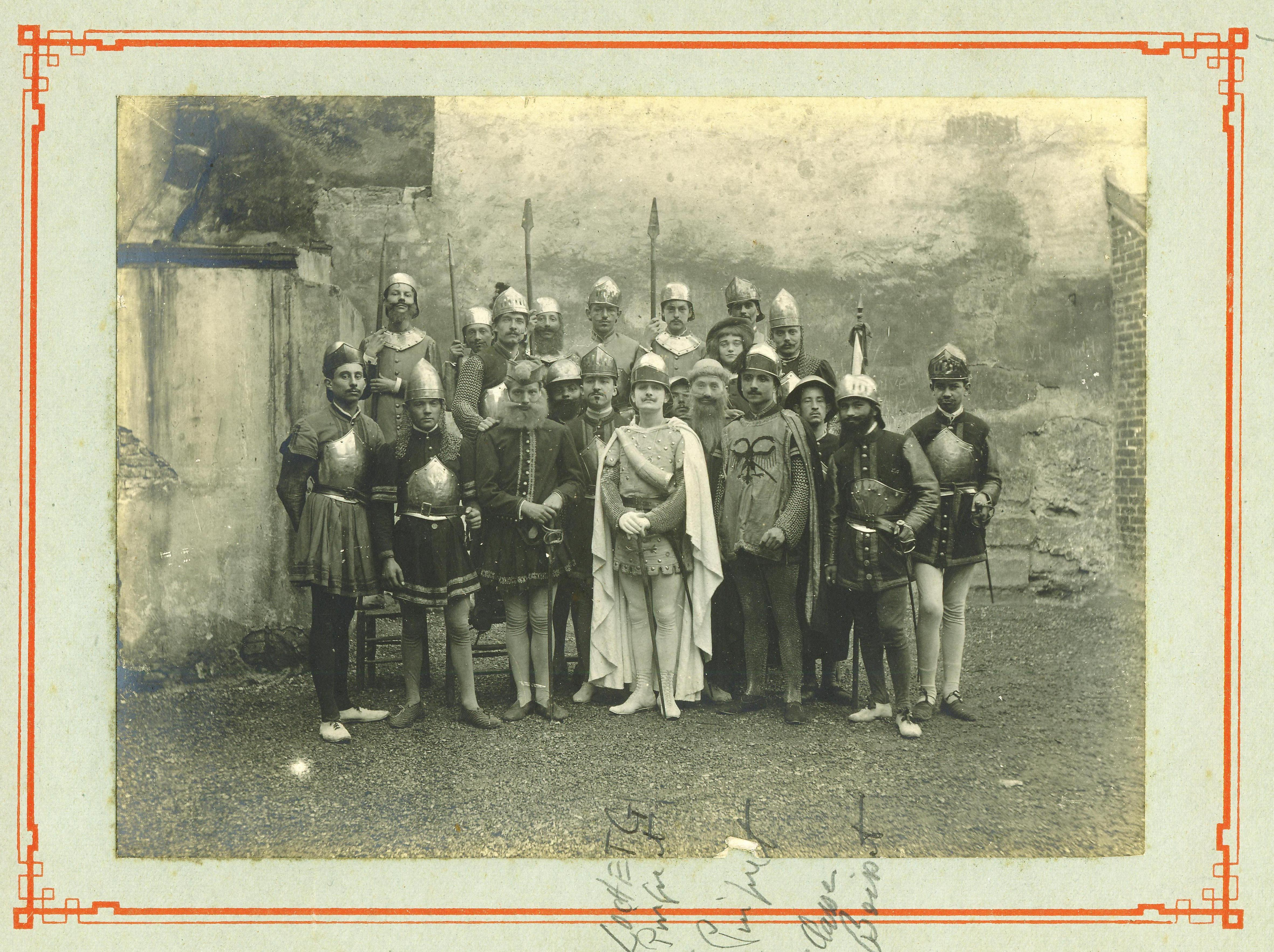
Theatrical performance in a patronage circa 1900.

Sports developed, particularly basketball, in which the general secretary, Armand Thibaudeau, was particularly invested. It first structured within the French Athletics Federation (FFA) born from the breakup of the USFSA immediately after the war. The same year, the first federal championship in this discipline appeared. (Note: Jouaret 2012, p. 102) By 1925, for the Paris region alone, the FGSPF had 110 teams, while the FFA only counted 57. (Note: Jouaret 2012, p. 166) It was a patronage from Le Havre founded in 1874, the Saint Thomas Basket Le Havre, which was the first club registered by the FFBB when it gained autonomy in 1932. This was also the time of the development of associations in French Algeria, and once again basketball was at the forefront. The Spartiates d'Oran, the best club in Algeria, were crowned champions of the French Union in 1949 after beating the military team of France and the Sports Association of Villeurbanne Éveil lyonnais (ASVEL). This association, 17-time French champions between 1949 and 2009, emerged in 1948 from the rather unusual merger of a Lyon patronage, the Éveil Sportif Sainte Marie de la Guillotière de Lyon (ESSMG), with the largely secular Sports Association of Villeurbanne, affiliated with the Workers' Sports and Gymnastics Federation (FSGT).

The FGSPF acknowledged the importance of theater (Note: Cholvy 1988, p. 204) (Note: Tranvouez 1999, p. 257) and cinema, (Note: Cholvy 1988, p. 215) (Note: Tranvouez 1999, p. 271) which have been integral parts of the patronages' activities since the 19th century. However, to prevent competition, these areas were not directly managed by the federation but were under the purview of the Catholic Works Theatrical Association (ATOCEP) and the Leisure and Cinematographic Culture Federation (FLECC). (Note: Jouaret 2012, p. 134) The same approach was taken with holiday camps, which saw growth with the introduction of paid vacations in 1922 and initiatives by Marc Sangnier (1873–1950) in establishing Youth Hostels (AJ) from 1929, as well as local scout troops affiliated with the patronages. (Note: Cholvy 1988, p. 277) President François Hébrard maintained positive relationships with these organizations that played a significant role in the daily activities of affiliated associations. It wasn't until 1968 that the French Sports and Cultural Federation (FSCF) officially assumed responsibility for these activities, which have been part of the patronages since their inception.

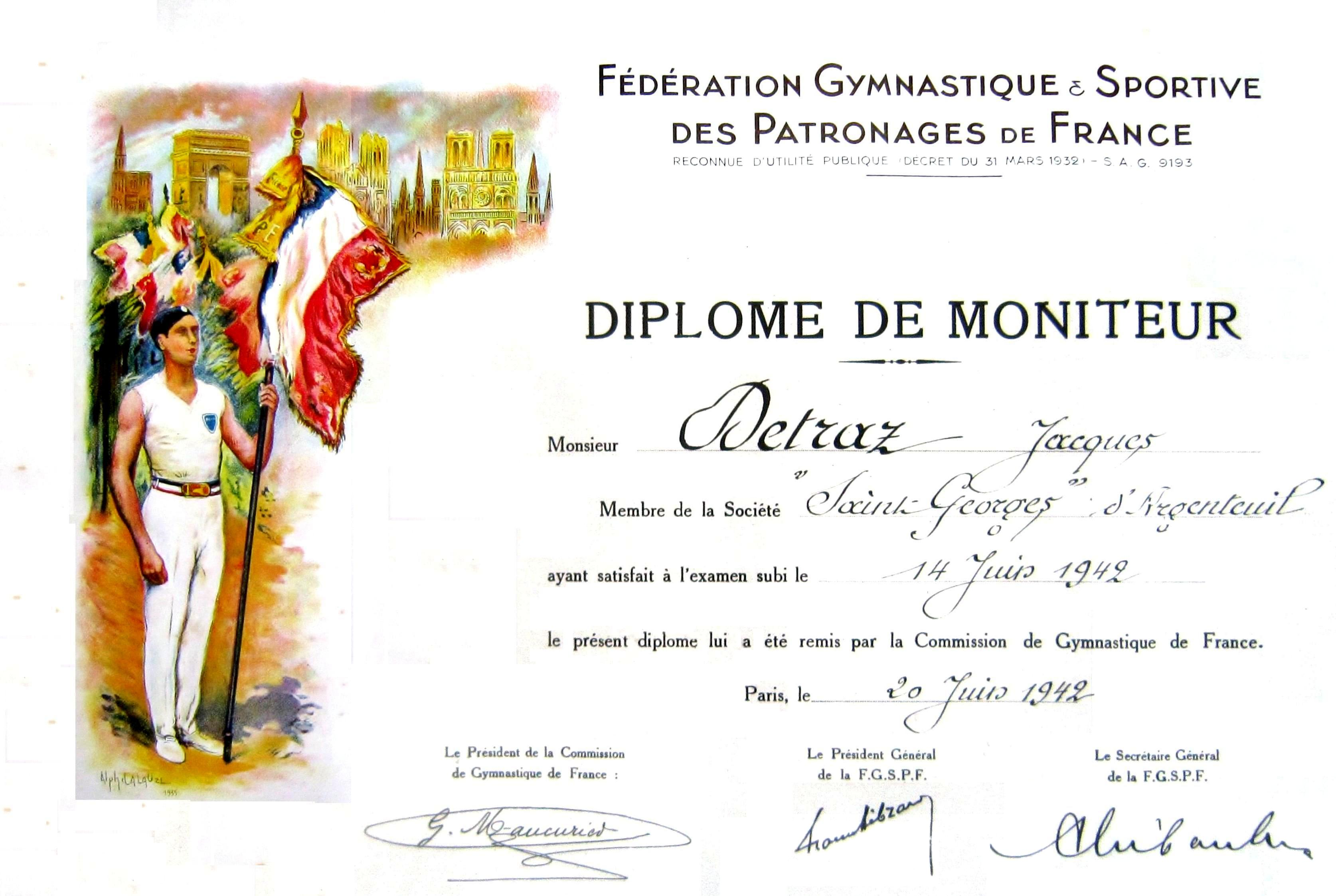
Even under the Occupation, training remained a priority for the FGSPF.

Gymnastics remains the primary activity, with Gabriel Maucurier, a former international gymnast and inspector for the city of Paris, leading important training efforts. The initiative began in 1924 with the Seine-et-Oise regional union, and in 1929, the FGSPF expanded the program to Strasbourg, followed by Royan in 1930, (Note: Jouaret 2012, p. 140) and the Joinville Higher School in 1935 for the first federal monitors' training course. By 1936, one-third of the French team at the Berlin Olympics was from the FGSPF. The FGSPF continued its dominance at the UIOCEPN Games (Note: FICEP's first name) in Vienna in 1936 (Note: Hervet 1948, p. 152) and Ljubljana in 1938, with athletes like Herman, Hérold, and the Schlidwein brothers leading the way. (Note: Hervet 1948, p. 155) Sports and gymnastics are the core focus of the FGSPF, with military preparation also playing a significant role. (Note: Groeninger 2004, pp. 76 et seq.) In 1935, the FGSPF awarded 3,732 certificates under its authority.

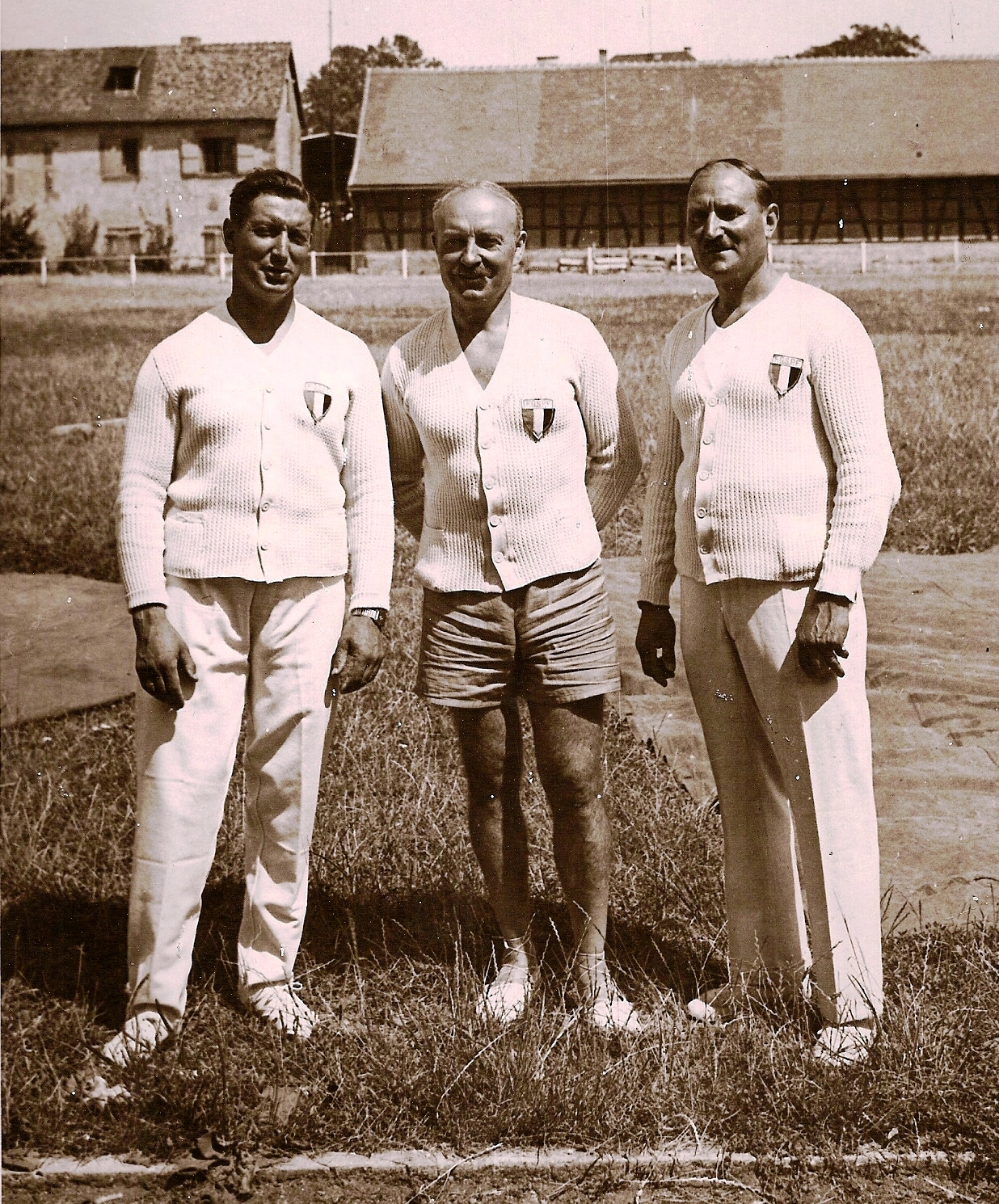
Strasbourg 1936, Gabriel Maucurier and his two deputies.

It was a time of grand event organization, with notable gatherings such as the one in Strasbourg in 1921 (266 associations, 18,000 gymnasts, and musicians), (Note: Jouaret 2012, pp. 106–108) the international competition at Champ-de-Mars in Paris on July 21 and 22, 1923, under the honorary presidency of Alexandre Millerand, President of the French Republic (600 associations, 28,000 gymnasts, and musicians), (Note: Jouaret 2012, p. 119) and the event in Nice in 1932 (422 associations, 19,000 gymnasts, and musicians). Large-scale movements were also organized outside of the metropolis, including events in Liège and Maribor in 1920; Brno from August 16 to 23, 1922, with special train for the 300 participants; (Note: Jouaret 2012, p. 114) Prague in 1929; Antwerp in 1930; Vienna in 1936; Liège in 1939; (Note: Jouaret 2012, p. 141) and a significant celebration in Algiers on June 14, 1930, marking the centenary of the landing of Sidi Fredj. Despite the economic crisis, 70 associations with 3,500 gymnasts and musicians from Bouches-du-Rhône, Alsace, Seine, Rhône, Aquitaine, and Maine-et-Loire participated in a grand federal competition. The Ganda from Ghent also contributed, with three special boats departing from Marseille: Lamoricière, Duke of Aumale, and Spain. (Note: Hervet 1948, pp. 80 and 144) Finally, on July 10 and 11, 1937, the federation brought together 900 associations, 33,000 gymnasts, and musicians (Note: Tranvouez 1999, p. 107) in Paris for the International Exposition.

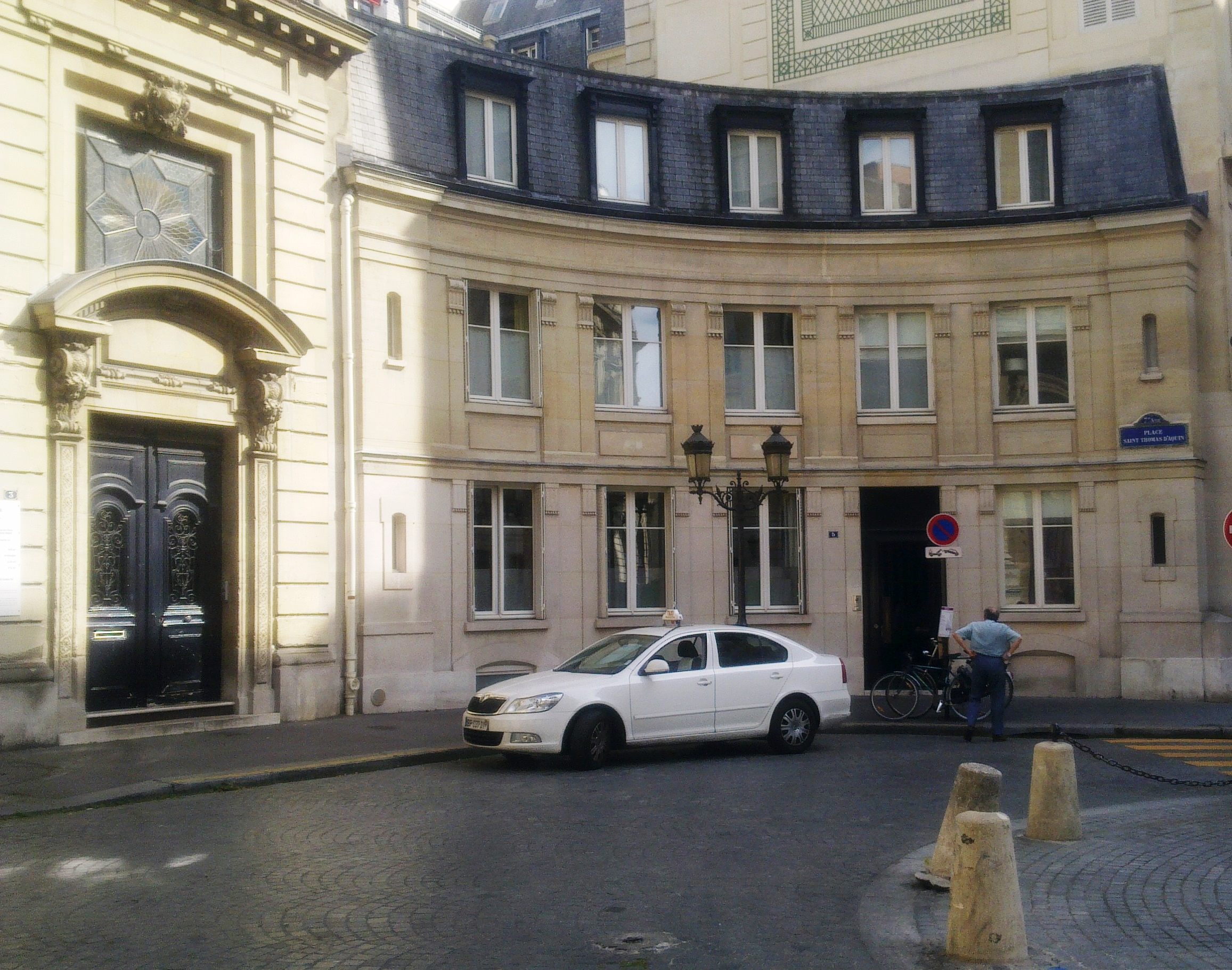
5 place Saint-Thomas d'Aquin, FGSPF headquarters from 1905.

The FGSPF also supports the development of school sports by granting full autonomy to the Gymnastic and Sports Union of Free Education, which later becomes the UGSEL. In addition to gymnastics and sports, it focuses on extracurricular physical education and establishes a physical education commission in 1935. This commission develops a physical education certificate inspired by Georges Hébert, (Note: Jouaret 2012, p. 132) which anticipates the Popular Sports Certificate (BSP) introduced by Léo Lagrange two years later. In the same year, the first Catholic skiers' competition organized by the regional union Ain-Savoies takes place in Tarentaise. The FGSPF facilitates the transition from traditional study circles to specialized Catholic action groups such as the Young Christian Workers (YCW), Catholic Agricultural Youth (JAC), and Catholic Worker Action (ACO). To amplify its influence, it establishes a communication network and engages in promotional activities. Recognized as a cornerstone of popular education and deemed of public utility by the decree of March 31, 1932, the FGSPF receives support from the Catholic hierarchy but faces challenges during wartime.

However, due to new regulations imposed by the Sports Charter on October 4, 1940, the Women's Sports Branch (RSF) (Note: Cholvy 1988, p. 249) (Note: Tranvouez 1999, p. 227) was compelled to merge with the FGSPF. (Note: Jouaret 2012, p. 154) (Note: Jouaret 1999b, p. 224) The Occupation of France divided the country, leading to the Lyon regional union, led by Dr. Exaltier, becoming the focal point of the FGSPF in the free zone. (Note: Groeninger 2004, p. 109) Eugénie Duisit was dispatched by the federation to oversee operations. On October 24, 1942, the FGSPF had to adopt the acronym mandated by the authorities as the Union Gymnastic and Sports of Patronages of France (UGSPF). (Note: Groeninger 2004, pp. 112–113) Following the Liberation, it briefly reverted to its original title before transitioning to the Sports Federation of France (FSF) in 1947.

The exact membership figures are hard to determine as official statistics are not available. The FGSPF is responsible for issuing licenses, but the process seems arbitrary. Congress reports often mention members, but the accuracy of these numbers was questioned by Robert Pringarbe. (Note: Jouaret 1999b, p. 382) A more reliable method to gauge active members in sports is to track participants in annual competitions. In 1938, there were 120,000 participants in 287 gymnastics competitions, along with 45 regional basketball competitions, 44 football competitions, and 36 athletics competitions. Despite the federation issuing only 95,277 licenses and claiming a membership of 650,000 at the subsequent federal congress, the actual number of active participants in sports events provides a clearer picture. (Note: Jouaret 2012, p. 146)

== Activities of the FGSPF ==
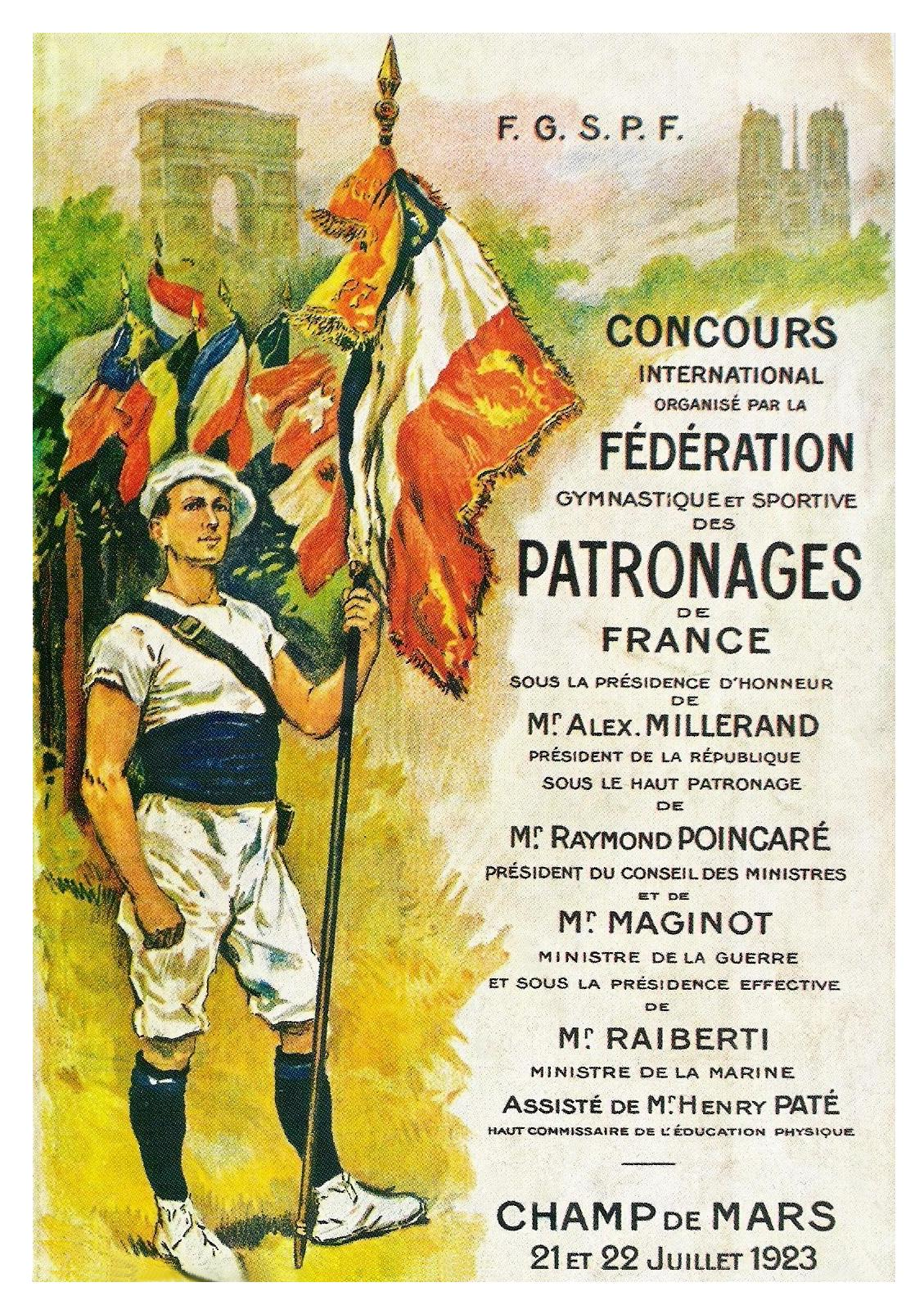
Poster by Alphonse Lalauze commissioned for the 25th anniversary of the FGSPF, Paris 1923.

The activity of the FGSPF was primarily focused on the first half of the 20th century, particularly before 1939, as federal activity was limited during the period of the last war. With a few exceptions such as boxing, fencing, cycling, rowing, and the new mechanical sports, (Note: Piard 2001, p. 107) single-sport federations truly emerged only twenty years earlier, after 1919, (Note: Piard 2001, p. 108) and sometimes laboriously so. For instance, basketball was only recognized as a separate sport by the French Athletics Federation (FFA) in 1931. Prior to this, sports were practiced, and often it was a bit of a "catch-all" sport: Frantz Reichel is an illustrious example of this versatility, and Ignace Heinrich, vice-champion in the decathlon at the 1948 Olympic Games in London, stated a few years ago: "In Alsace, athletics, even for me, started in May; before that, it was cross-country and basketball." The results of a strictly disciplinary championship often included unexpected events. Traces of this can still be found with challenges like the basketball-athlete, the football-athlete, and the complete gymnast, the last edition (Note: Awarded the title to Yves Leton of the Jeunes Carnutes de Chartres, who died on August 29, 2013.) of which took place in 1966.

It is challenging to analyze the contemporary sports model from this perspective. Despite the advancements in football, basketball, cross-country, and athletics, the essence of popular sports activity lies in large gymnastics gatherings, which is the primary focus of this federation. Originally intended to promote complete and harmonious physical development and skills, gymnastics was predominantly a multi-sport discipline. (Note: Piard 2001, p. 103) Running, jumping, throwing, climbing, lifting-carrying, and swimming events were prevalent in gymnastics championships until 1954 when they were phased out at the Moscow championships. (Note: Piard 2001, p. 102) Prior to this change, champions often excelled in weightlifting, throwing, or pole vaulting rather than traditional gymnastics apparatus like the horizontal bar. Floor acrobatics were also absent from competitive programs during this time. The Occupation period further emphasized the natural physical education method advocated by Georges Hébert, promoting the concept of the complete athlete. This approach persisted in patronages until the establishment of the FSFP and began to decline after the Rome Olympics in 1960.

== The Federal Song ==
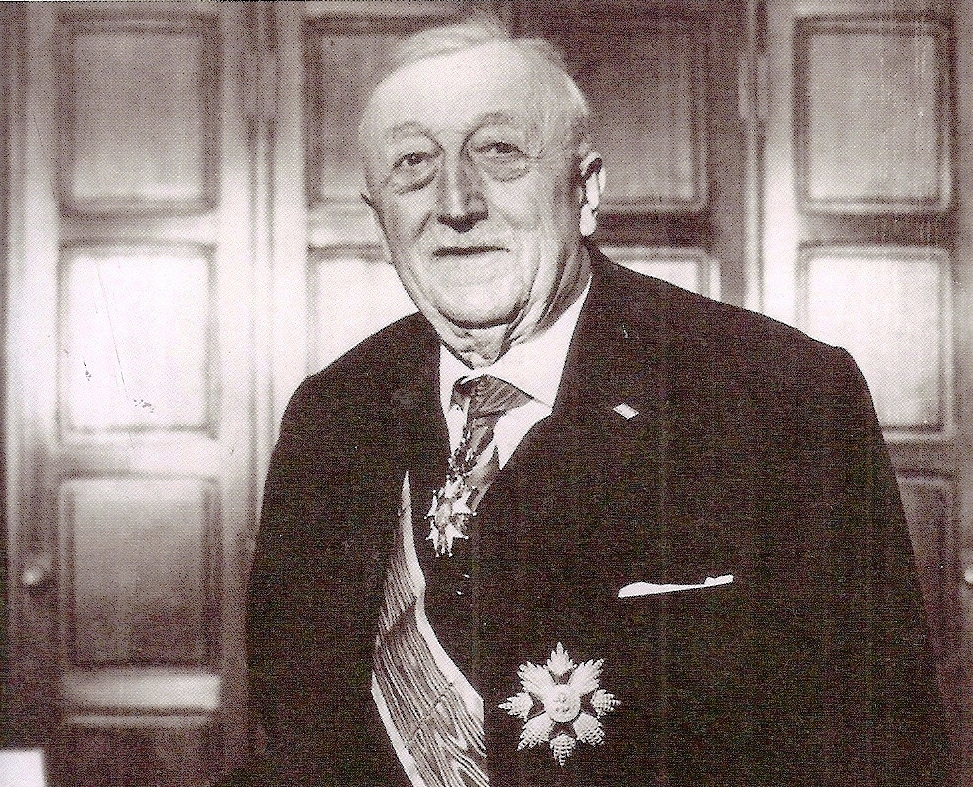
François Hébrard, President of the FGSPF from 1923 to 1947.

Since Francisco Amoros, collective singing has been a genuine exercise associated with gymnastics. In 1818, he published a work grouping together the best works suited for this purpose. The FGSPF also follows this tradition and has its own anthem, first published on March 27, 1932. The anthem exalts patriotic and spiritual values with lyrics by R.P. Bellouard and martial music by Gabriel Defrance, who was the president of the music and bands commission. (Note: Jouaret 1999a, p. 365) Here is the chorus:

"We stand here in the arena

O France, applaud our battles

The voices of the great dead lead us

And the Federation guides our steps."

This work is not confidential and should be known to all members of the federation. Its execution is a part of the ranking of gymnastics competitions, and each section must perform it outdoors in a deployed order, marking time in place before proceeding to ensemble exercises, (Note: Tranvouez 1999, p. 238) often in the early morning dew. This practice was followed until the 1960s.

== Note: FGSPF Purchases ==
In 1925, the FGSPF established a commercial entity known as the Purchasing Service, which operates independently and shares the same acronym (FGSPF, meaning General Sporting Supplies for the Patronages of France). (Note: Jouaret 1999b, pp. 140–141) This small and medium-sized enterprise (SME) is tasked with providing sports supplies and equipment (such as clothing, balls, and gymnastics apparatus) to the headquarters services and members.

== Notes and references ==
=== Références ===
- Gérard Cholvy:
1. Cholvy 1988, p. 204
2. Cholvy 1988, p. 215
3. Cholvy 1988, p. 277
4. Cholvy 1988, p. 27
5. Cholvy 1988, p. 249
- Fabien Groeninger:
1. Groeninger 2004, p. 16
2. Groeninger 2004, p. 19
3. Groeninger 2004, p. 75
4. Groeninger 2004, p. 35
5. Groeninger 2004, p. 93
6. Groeninger 2004, p. 57
7. Groeninger 2004, p. 64
8. Groeninger 2004, pp. 76–77
9. Groeninger 2004, pp. 74, 85, 148–149.
10. Groeninger 2004, pp. 76 et seq.
11. Groeninger 2004, pp. 68, 69
12. Groeninger 2004, pp. 71, 72
13. Groeninger 2004, p. 39
14. Groeninger 2004, p. 73
15. Groeninger 2004, p. 29
16. Groeninger 2004, pp. 46–49
17. Groeninger 2004, p. 109
18. Groeninger 2004, pp. 112–113
- Robert Hervet:
1. Hervet 1948, p. 35
2. Hervet 1948, p. 40
3. Hervet 1948, p. 57
4. Hervet 1948, p. 41
5. Hervet 1948, p. 64
6. Hervet 1948, p. 152
7. Hervet 1948, p. 155
8. Hervet 1948, pp. 80 and 144
- Jean-Marie Jouaret:
1. Jouaret 2012, p. 22
2. Jouaret 2012, pp. 31–32
3. Jouaret 2012, p. 32
4. Jouaret 2012, p. 36
5. Jouaret 2012, p. 41
6. Jouaret 2012, p. 52
7. Jouaret 2012, p. 47
8. Jouaret 2012, p. 54
9. Jouaret 1999a, p. 168
10. Jouaret 2012, p. 17
11. Jouaret 2012, p. 20
12. Jouaret 2012, p. 40
13. Jouaret 2012, p. 43
14. Jouaret 2012, p. 59
15. Jouaret 2012, p. 74
16. Jouaret 1999b, p. 389
17. Jouaret 2012, p. 102
18. Jouaret 2012, p. 166
19. Jouaret 2012, p. 134
20. Jouaret 2012, p. 140
21. Jouaret 2012, pp. 106–108
22. Jouaret 2012, p. 119
23. Jouaret 2012, p. 93
24. Jouaret 2012, p. 114
25. Jouaret 2012, p. 141
26. Jouaret 2012, p. 132
27. Jouaret 2012, p. 154
28. Jouaret 1999b, p. 224
29. Jouaret 1999b, p. 382
30. Jouaret 2012, p. 146
31. Jouaret 1999a, p. 365
32. Jouaret 1999b, pp. 140–141
- Laurence Munoz et Jan Tolleneer :
1. Munoz & Tolleneer 2011, p. 34
2. Munoz & Tolleneer 2011, p. 36
3. Munoz & Tolleneer 2011, pp. 38–39
4. Munoz & Tolleneer 2011, pp. 37–38
5. Munoz & Tolleneer 2011, p. 29
- Claude Piard :
1. Piard 2009, p. 14
2. Piard 2009, p. 17
3. Piard 2009, p. 30
4. Piard 2009, p. 22
5. Piard 2001, p. 107
6. Piard 2001, p. 108
7. Piard 2001, p. 84
8. Piard 2001, p. 103
9. Piard 2001, p. 102
10. Piard 2001, p. 67
- Yvon Tranvouez :
1. Tranvouez 1999, pp. 227–240
2. Tranvouez 1999, p. 157
3. Tranvouez 1999, p. 193
4. Tranvouez 1999, p. 89
5. Tranvouez 1999, p. 257
6. Tranvouez 1999, p. 271
7. Tranvouez 1999, p. 107
8. Tranvouez 1999, p. 227
9. Tranvouez 1999, p. 238
- Les Jeunes (FSCF periodical magazine):
- Additional references:

== Bibliography ==
- Arvin-Bérod, Alain (2003). Et Didon créa la devise olympique (in French). Grenoble: Scriforius. ISBN 2-908854-16-3.
- Cholvy, Gérard (1988). Le patronage, ghetto ou vivier (in French). Paris: Nouvelles cités. ISBN 2-85313-171-8.
- Dumons, Bruno; Berjat, Muriel (1987). Naissance du sport moderne (in French). Lyon: La Manufacture. ISBN 2-7377-0043-4.
- Fédération sportive et culturelle de France (1997). 100 ans de sport et de fraternité (in French). Caen: Norvik. ISBN 2-912047-03-X.
- Fédération sportive et culturelle de France (2010). Programme fédéral (in French). Paris: FSCF.
- Groeninger, Fabien (2004). Sport, religion et nation, la fédération des patronages d'une guerre mondiale à l'autre (in French). Paris: L’Harmattan. ISBN 2-7475-6950-0.
- Hervet, Robert (1948). La Fédération Sportive de France (1898-1948) (in French). Paris: Henriot et Guyot. OCLC 66302325.
- Jouaret, Jean-Marie (1999a). Petite histoire partielle et partiale de la Fédération sportive et culturelle de France (1948–1998) (in French). Vol. 1. Paris: FSCF. ISBN 2-9528387-0-4.
- Jouaret, Jean-Marie (1999b). Petite histoire partielle et partiale de la Fédération sportive et culturelle de France (1948-1998) (in French). Vol. 2. Paris: FSCF. ISBN 978-2-9528387-0-2.
- Jouaret, Jean-Marie (2012). La fédération des sections sportives des patronages catholiques de France (1898-1998) (in French). Paris: L'Harmattan. ISBN 978-2-296-55969-1.
- Jung, François (2000). "Le Docteur Paul Michaux, 1854-1924" (PDF). Mémoires de l'ANM (in French).
- Ligneau, Léon (2003). La Jeune France à Cholet, histoire d'un centenaire (in French). Maulévrier: Hérault. ISBN 2-7407-0194-2.
- Munoz, Laurence; Tolleneer, Jan (May 20, 2011). L'Église, le sport et l'Europe : La Fédération internationale catholique d'éducation physique (FICEP) à l'épreuve du temps (1911–2011). Espaces et Temps du sport (in French). Paris: L’Harmattan. ISBN 978-2-296-54931-9.
- Piard, Claude (1974). Vers une nouvelle politique sportive (in French). Paris: Vigot.
- Piard, Claude (2000). Où va la gym ? : l'éducation physique à l'heure des STAPS (in French). Paris: L’Harmattan. ISBN 2-7384-9242-8.
- Piard, Claude (2001). Éducation physique et sport : petit manuel d'histoire élémentaire (in French). Paris: L’Harmattan. ISBN 2-7475-1744-6.
- Piard, Claude (2009). 125 ans avec un patro de banlieue : la Saint-Georges d'Argenteuil, 1884-2009 (in French). Paris: L’Harmattan. ISBN 978-2-296-07636-5.
- Toulza, Alain (2014). La Grande Guerre des Hommes de Dieu : Héros des tranchées, entre persécutions et Union Sacrée (in French). Paris: DRAC. ISBN 978-2-9547974-0-3.
- Tranvouez, Yvon (1999). Sport, culture et religion, les patronages catholiques (1898-1998) (in French). Brest: Presses de l’université de Bretagne occidentale. ISBN 2-901737-39-0.

== Annexes ==
=== Additional sources ===
- Fédération sportive et culturelle de France (FSCF) 1898–2002 et du Rayon sportif féminin (RSF) 1936–1984 (PDF) (in French). Archives nationales du monde du travail. September 2007. Archived from the original on 1998-11-29. (Deposit of the archives of the Fédération sportive et culturelle de France at the Archives nationales du monde du travail, within the Pôle national des archives du monde sportif and as part of the MéMoS (mémoire du sport) program).

=== See also ===
- "Les Jeunes sur Gallica". gallica.bnf.fr (in French).
