= Clément Schertzinger =

French sporting director (1936–2026)

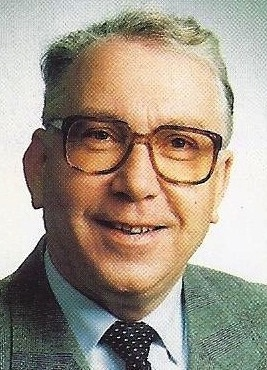

President of the Fédération internationale catholique d'éducation physique et sportive
- In office 2003–2009
- Preceded by: Dick Wijte
- Succeeded by: Elke Haider

President of the Fédération sportive et culturelle de France
- In office 22 November 1992 – 24 November 2002
- Preceded by: Jacques Gautheron
- Succeeded by: Jean Vintzel

Personal details
- Born: 24 July 1936 Colmar, France
- Died: 17 July 2026 (aged 89) Colmar, France
- Occupation: Sporting director

Clément Schertzinger (French: [klemˈɑ̃ ʃɛʁtsɛ̃ʒˈe]; 24 July 1936 – 17 July 2026) was a French sporting director.

== Life and career ==
Born in Colmar on 24 July 1936, Schertzinger was the son of Albert and Henriette Schertzinger and attended Catholic school in Saint-Hippolyte. In 1951, he joined a sports and leisure club in Neuf-Brisach, where he took part in atheletics, handball, and gymnastics. He studied accounting and managed a firm in Colmar with 40 employees. He then joined Avant-garde du Rhin, of which he served as treasurer and then president from 1984 to 1996.

In 1990, Schertzinger was elected to the steering committee of the Fédération sportive et culturelle de France before assuming the presidency on 22 November 1992. Under his leadership, the professionalization of the organization's structures was improved. He also sponsored new events, such as early childhood development activities and hiking. He also created performing and visual arts commissions. On 24 November 2002, he stepped down from the role. From 1999 to 2003, he was Secretary General of the Fédération internationale catholique d'éducation physique et sportive, and then served as president from 2003 to 2009.

In 2009, Schertzinger was appointed by Prime Minister François Fillon to serve on the Haut Conseil à la vie associative and was also the Vatican's delegate for Sport on the Council of Europe. He was also a board member of the Abbaye de Marbach association.

Schertzinger died in Colmar on 17 July 2026, at the age of 89.

== Distinctions ==
- Medal of Youth, Sports and Community Involvement (1978)
- Officer of the Order of the Crown of Belgium (2002)
- Knight of the Legion of Honour (2005)
- Knight of the National Order of Madagascar (2008)
- Knight of the Order of St. Sylvester (2014)
