= Paul Michaux =

French surgeon (1854–1923)

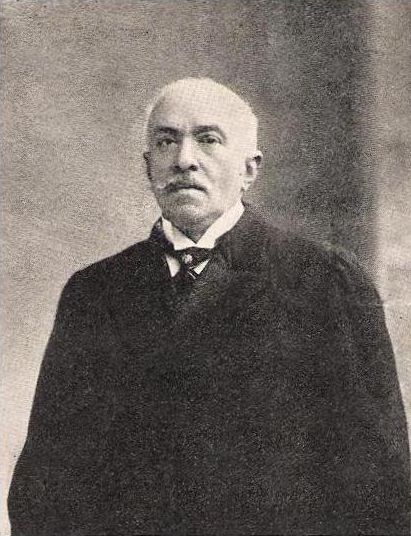
- Paul Michaux in the late nineteenth or early twentieth century
- Born: Paul-Marie Michaux; 16 November 1854; Metz, France
- Died: 21 November 1923 (aged 69); Paris, France
- Occupations: Surgeon and clinical director
- Known for: Founding president of the Fédération gymnastique et sportive des patronages de France (later became the Fédération sportive et culturelle de France); Founding vice-president of the Fédération internationale catholique d'éducation physique et sportive; First president of the Conférence Olivaint
- Awards: Grand Cross of the Order of St. Sylvester; Knight of the National Order of the Legion of Honour; Cross of Commander of the Order of St. Gregory the Great

Doctor Paul Michaux (born Paul-Marie Michaux; 16 November 1854 – 21 November 1923) was a French surgeon. After studying at the Paul Verlaine University – Metz, he moved to Paris, where he actively participated in the Conférence Olivaint and later became president of the organisation. After completing an internship and a thesis, his career led him into various hospitals in the city and suburbs, where he developed medical innovations and conducted research. As a member of the parish patronage committee, Michaux's moral and religious beliefs led him to establish a type of gymnastics specifically intended for Christian Patriots. His enthusiasm for the sport was reflected with the foundation of the Fédération gymnastique et sportive des patronages de France in 1898, which later became the Fédération sportive et culturelle de France, the foundation of the Fédération gymnastique et sportive des patronages de France in 1898 (later the Fédération sportive et culturelle de France), an organisation which took prompt steps to support team sports (including football and basketball) as well as choral music.

Michaux organised two major gymnastic competitions, which both contributed to the founding of the Fédération internationale catholique d'éducation physique et sportive in 1911. Following the end of the First World War, Michaux organised a gymnastic competition in his hometown of Metz. At his funeral in November 1923, many representatives of both the military and the medical profession as well as over three thousand gymnasts were in attendance. His involvement in the fields of sports and business earned him many accolades, including being appointed as a Knight of the National Order of the Legion of Honour by Marshal Ferdinand Foch. Michaux was awarded the Cross of Commander of the Order of St. Gregory the Great by Pope Pius X, and in 1911 he received the Grand Cross of the Order of St. Sylvester.

== Biography ==
=== Early career ===
Born in Metz into a Catholic family, Paul-Marie Michaux studied in the college town of St Clement, where he was appreciated by his fellow students. He and his family were refugees to Paris, where he joined the Faculty of Medicine at the University of Paris. The following year, Michaux joined the Conférence Olivaint, along with a few fellow students. In this group, under the auspices of René Laennec, sessions of prayer began, and members attended Mass together two Sundays per month. This conference quickly built a solid reputation among students and physicians and was officially recognized in 1879, when Paul Michaux was appointed to be its first president. The group supported Michaux's conclusions in his thesis on cancer of the parotid gland in 1884. Today, Conférence Olivaint is the oldest student society in France.

Michaux became a hospital surgeon in 1887, and he first worked at the Beaujon Hospital and later became a head of department at the Hôpital Charles-Foix, Ivry, in 1896. The following year he was a staff member at the Broussais Hospital and then at the Lariboisière Hospital in 1901. In 1904, he rejoined Beaujon Hospital, where he remained until his 1916 retirement. He was a staunch advocate of prophylaxis — installing one of the first autoclaves made in 1893 — and performed the first cholecystectomy in France.

=== Creating the FGSPF ===
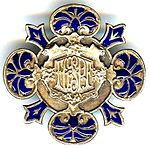
Broche de la Fédération gymnastique et sportive des patronages de France

In 1874, during his second year of medical school, Michaux invested his time to establish a quasi-military type of gymnastics. In 1889, he joined the committee for sports patronage in Paris. On 15 December 1897, Michaux proposed an annual gym competition. With over 4,000 spectators and 600 gymnasts from twenty-three different associations, the success (in Michaux's view) of this 24 July 1898 competition meant that Michaux's intentions were fulfilled. Supported by some close friends including Francois Hebrard, on 24 July 1898 he created the Union des Sociétés de gymnastique et d'instruction militaire des patronages et œuvres de jeunesse de France (USGIMPOJF). On 8 December 1900, USGIMPOJF organised a competition where over 1,800 gymnasts participated. The following year, the federation was renamed the Fédération des sociétés catholiques de gymnastique (FSCG), and sports such as football, cross-country, shooting and swimming were included alongside gymnastics.

In 1898, Michaux founded the Fédération gymnastique et sportive des patronages de France (FGSPF), which acquired its first premises at 5 Place Saint-Thomas-d'Aquin in the 7th arrondissement of Paris on 15 July 1905. Under Michaux's tutelage, the FGSPF became the first federation to advocate the duty to examine athletes' medical conditions. Although gymnastics was the main sport, other sports, such as football and basketball, also competed at the FGSPF. It also provided music education to its athletes.

=== Before the First World War ===
Before the events of the First World War, Michaux began to create sports sponsorships in preparation for the "Brevet spécial d'éducation militaire", or special patent military education. However, religious education was the priority for scholarships and competitions. The Church of France supported the position of Pope Pius X and encouraged physical education in France. In 1911, Pius X awarded Michaux the Grand Cross of the Order of St. Sylvester.

Michaux's gymnastics federation and sports sponsorships maintained their popularity. For example, following the invitation to participate in the Olympics by Pierre de Coubertin, the Fédération gymnastique et sportive des patronages de France was a leading supporter of the proposed Olympic Oath. Its general secretary, Charles Simon, was responsible for the development of football in France. In their final competition before World War I, 8,500 athletes were brought together to Lorraine.

=== Postwar ===
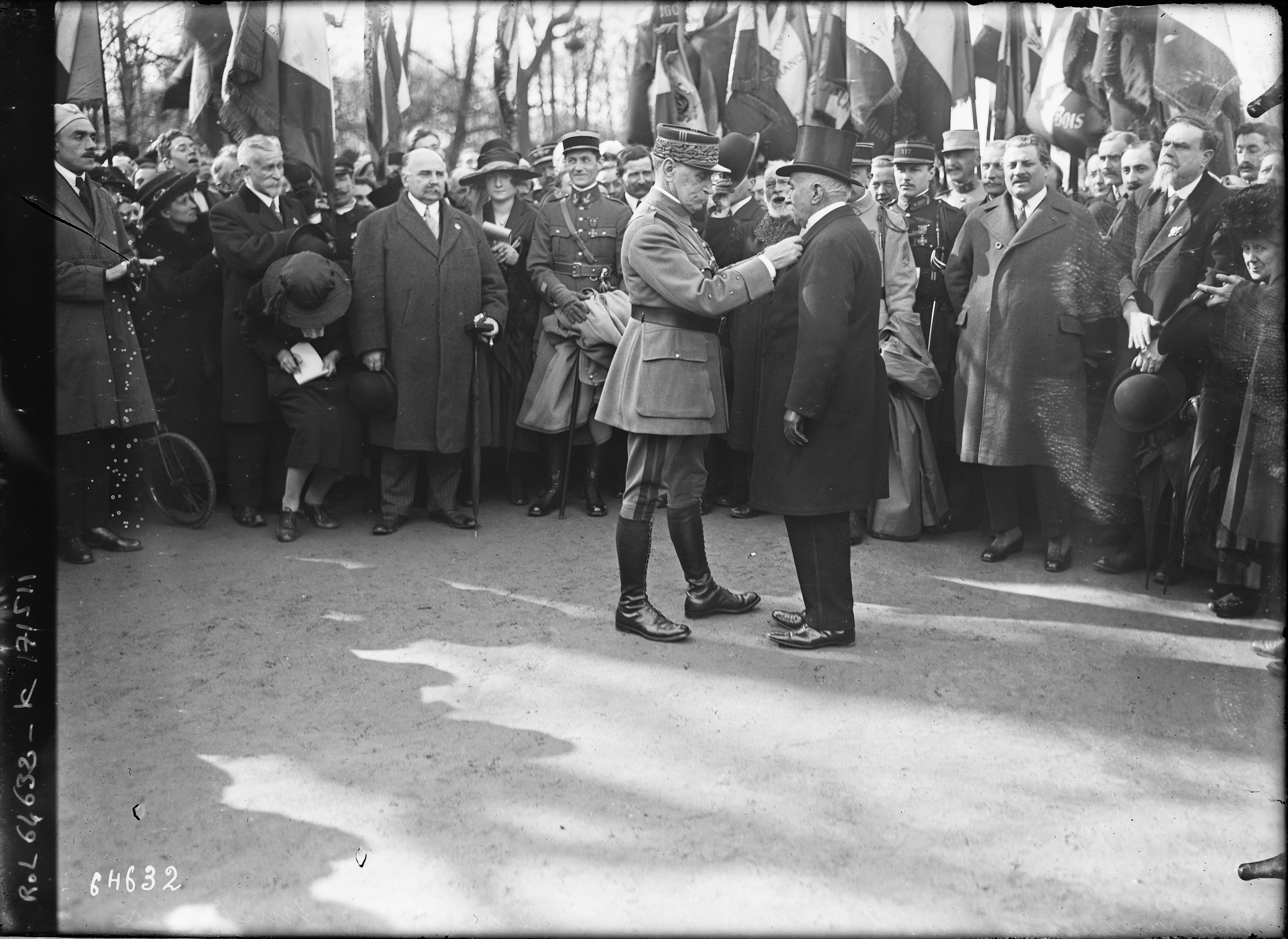
Michaux receiving the Legion of Honour from Ferdinand Foch

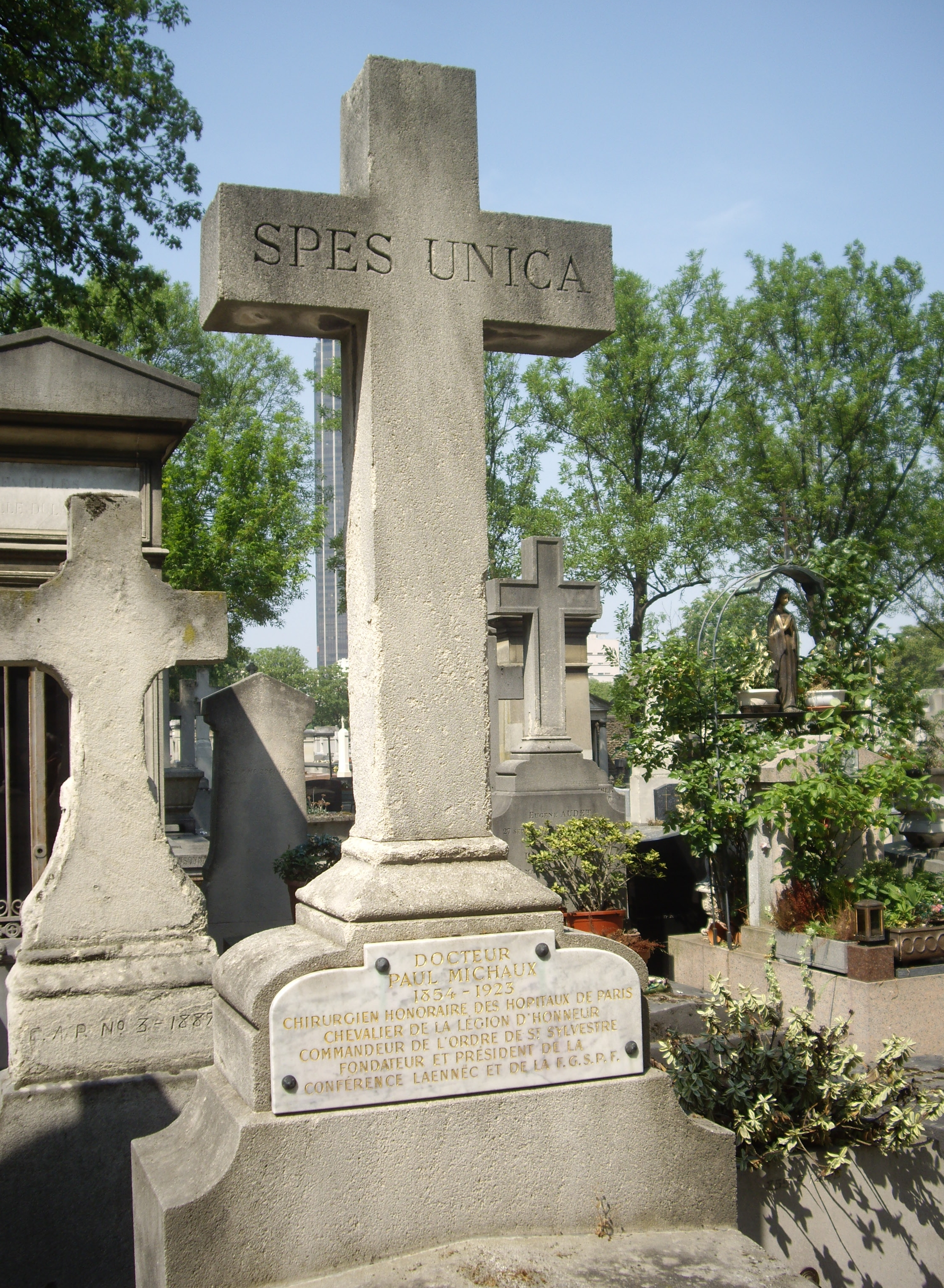
Tomb of Paul Michaux at the Montparnasse Cemetery

During the First World War, the Fédération gymnastique et sportive des patronages of France lost over 24,000 of its members. Despite these devastating losses, the federation did not cease its regular activities. During the war, Michaux offered services for staff who were not able to participate in the war. On 4 August 1919, the first post-war contest was held in Metz, with an attendance exceeding 7,000 gymnasts. In 1921, Michaux was named Knight of the National Order of the Legion of Honour for having "spent over 20 years in the physical education of youth and military preparation". (Note: Original quote in French: "dépensé depuis plus de 20 ans à l'éducation physique de la jeunesse et à la préparation militaire". See Groeninger 2004, pp. 93–94) On 20 March 1921, over 5,000 gymnasts gathered as Marshal Ferdinand Foch presented Michaux the award. Soon thereafter, Michaux was awarded the Cross of Commander of the Order of St. Gregory the Great by Pope Pius X.

On 21 and 22 July 1923, due to illness, Michaux was unable to attend a parade of roughly 30,000 gymnasts on the Champs-Élysées. He died later that same year on 21 November 1923. Michaux's funeral was held at the Église Saint-Thomas-d'Aquin (Church of St. Thomas Aquinas) by the Archbishop of Paris, Louis-Ernest Dubois, in the presence of Michaux's long-time friend Foch. Fourteen leading doctors and surgeons, the Director of the Public Assistance, thirteen generals and admirals and nearly 3,000 gymnasts with flags from over 50 associations and 72 regional unions paraded before his coffin. His body was buried in Montparnasse Cemetery.

== Recognition ==
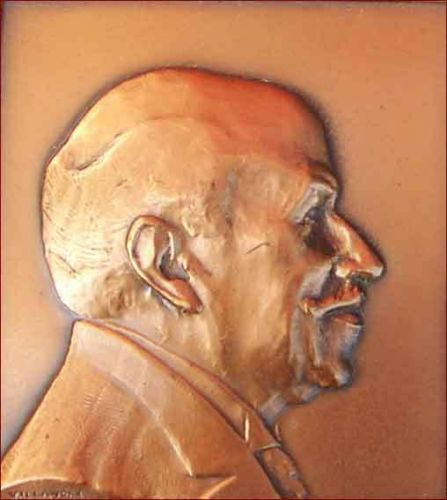
Honneur fédéral FSCF (vermeil) (Note: The Federal honor (vermeil) is the highest distinction, awarded by the Steering Committee to FSCF volunteers who serve for more than 35 years.)

As a token of gratitude to its founder, the FSCF placed Michaux's visage on medals that are awarded to FSCF volunteers. This distinction has four types of awards: Federal merit (in bronze, silver or vermeil), the Federal dedication (in bronze, silver or vermeil), the Federal recognition (in bronze, silver or vermeil) and the Federal honor (in vermeil). Several cities have adopted his name for streets, including the Rue Paul Michaux in Metz. By decree dated 21 July 1934, the Council of Paris named a plaza the Place du Docteur-Paul-Michaux in the 16th arrondissement of Paris. On 3 October 1998, a commemorative plaque was placed on his birthplace, at 8 rue Mazelle in Metz. The Union Jeanne Lorraine has created a cross trophy that bears his name to this day.

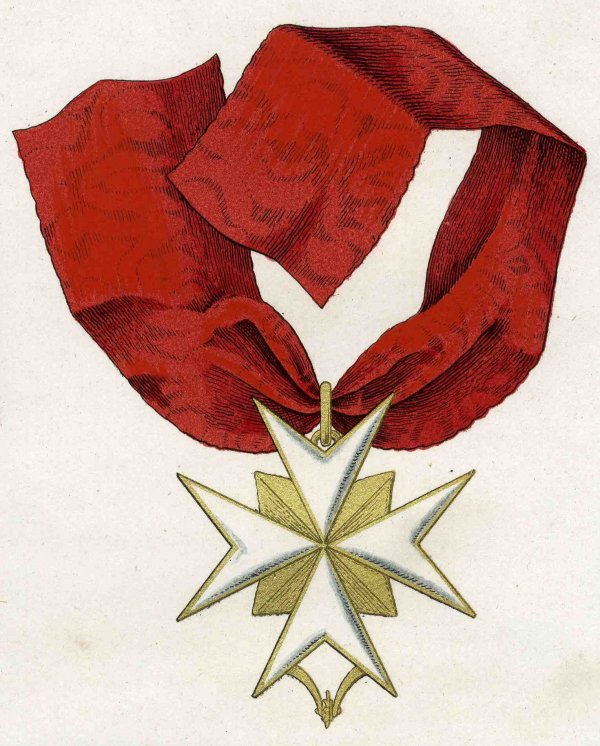
Cravate de commandeur de l'ordre de Saint-Sylvestre

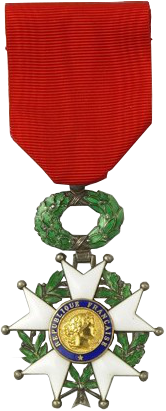
Médaille de chevalier de l'Ordre national de la Légion d'honneur

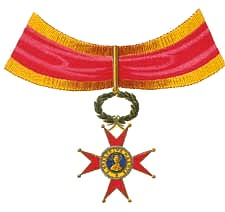
Cravate de commandeur de l'Ordre de Saint-Grégoire-le-Grand

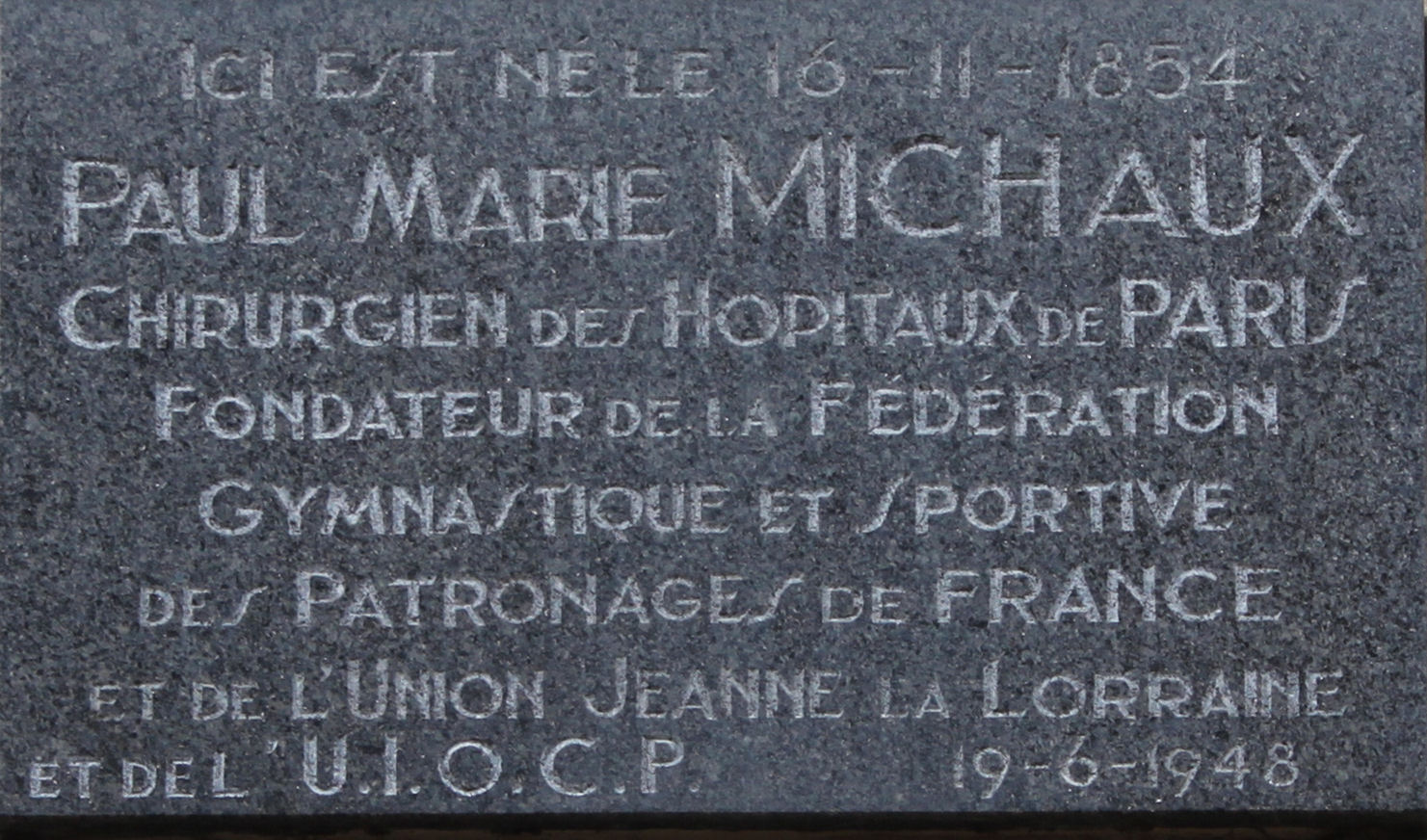
Commemorative plaque on the house where Paul Michaux was born with inscription: "Here was born the 16-11-1854 Paul Marie Michaux, Surgeon of Paris Hospitals Founder of Gymnastics and Sports Federation of France and Sponsorships Union Jeanne Lorraine and UIOCP 19-6-1948." (Note: On this plate, one can observe that the letter E does not appear in the acronym UIOCEP, which was probably forgotten when burning.)

== Bibliography ==
- Barbet, Pierre (1923). Le docteur Paul Michaux. Paris: Spes. OCLC 458615053.
- FSCF (2011). Fédération sportive et culturelle de France. le visionnaire, dans Les Jeunes, 2528.
- Groeninger, Fabien (2004). Sport, religion et nation. Paris: L'Harmattan. ISBN 2-7475-6950-0.
- Hervert, Robert (1947). La FSF de 1898–1948. Paris. OCLC 66302325.
- Jouaret, Jean-Marie (2012). La fédération des sections sportives des patronages catholiques de France (1898–1998). Paris: L'Harmattan. ISBN 978-2-296-55969-1.
- Jouaret, Jean-Marie (1999). Petite histoire partielle et partiale de la Fédération sportive et culturelle de France (1948–1998). Vol. I. Paris: L'Harmattan. ISBN 2-9528387-0-4.
- Jung, Docteur François (2000). "Le docteur Paul Michaux, 1854–1924". dans Mémoires de l'Académie nationale de Metz.
- Munoz, Laurence (2003). Des patronages aux associations. Paris: L'Harmattan. ISBN 2-7475-5144-X.
- Rocolle, Michel (2006). A decoration? Why not!. dans Les Jeunes, 2502.
- Sarre, Pierre (2006). Les grandes figures de la Fédé. dans Les Jeunes, 2502.
