= Catholic youth sports associations of French Algeria =

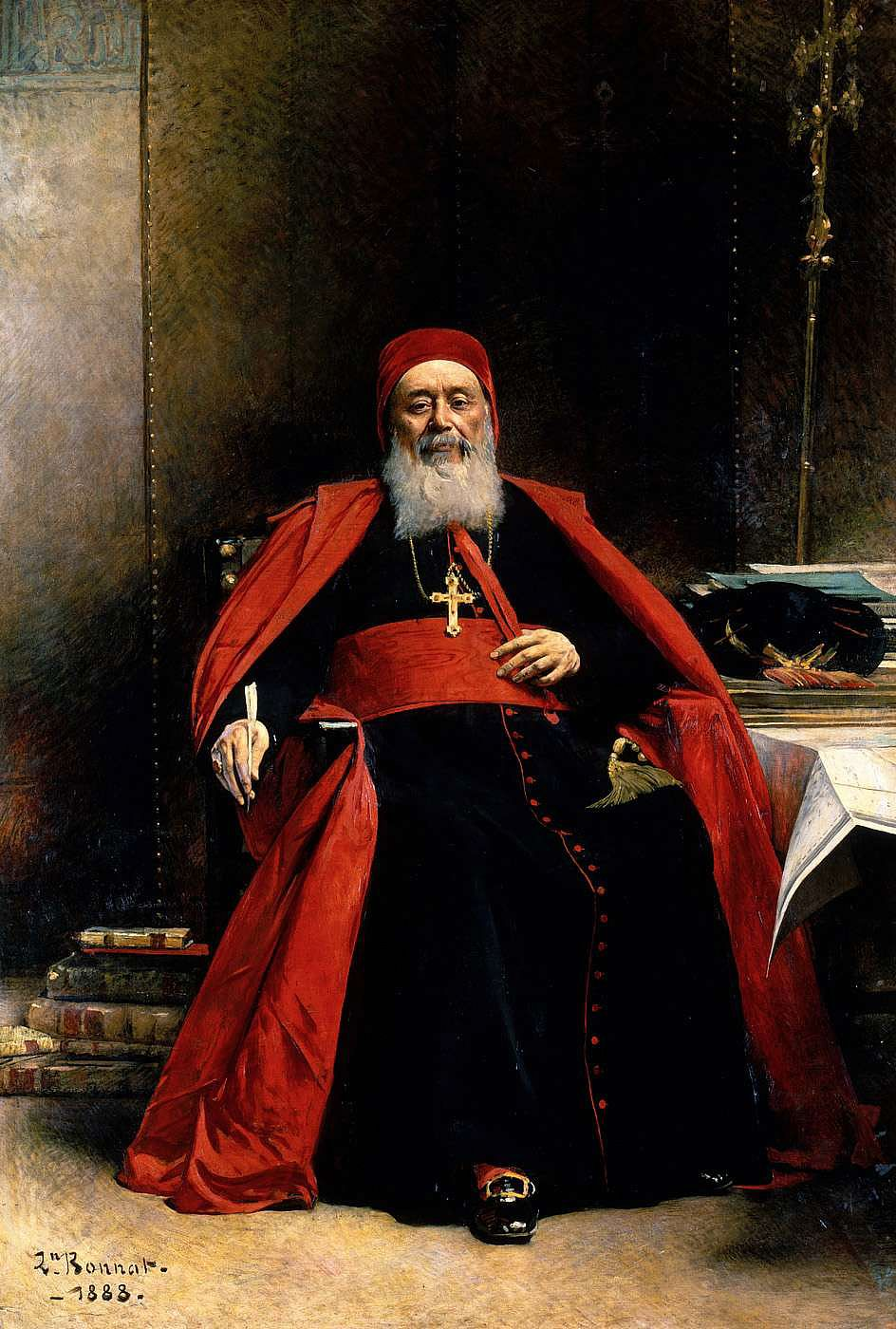
- Membership: Catholic youth associations of Sainte-Croix, Saint-Joseph d'Hussein Dey, Avenir d'El Biar, Union régionale oranaise, Union régionale d'Alger, Union régionale de la province d'Alger, Spartiates d'Eckmülh, Olympique du Petit Séminaire (OPS), Olympique de Saint-Eugène (OSE), Unions d'Algérie, Libellules de la Redoute, Mouettes Oranaises, Hirondelles de Notre Dame d'Afrique, Mouettes, Mimosas du champ de manoeuvre, Marguerites de Mustapha, Capucines de Belcourt, Glycines de Mustapha, Coquelicots de Mustapha, Rayon Sportif féminin algérien, Bleuets d'Alger, Boutons d'Or de Kouba, Bruyères d'Hussein Dey, Cyclamens de Bab El Oued, Union sportive de Laghouat (USL), Société sportive saharienne (SSS), Union sportive geryvilloise, Étoile du Sud.
- Founded: Early 20th century
- Affiliation: Fédération gymnastique et sportive des patronages de France (FGSPF), Rayon sportif féminin (RSF), then Fédération sportive de France (FSF) former name of Fédération sportive et culturelle de France (FSCF)

The Catholic youth sports associations of French Algeria (French: patronages de l'Algérie française) first appeared in major cities in northern Algeria at the beginning of the 20th century and were mainly reserved for young European people. By the start of the First World War some of the associations had joined the Fédération internationale catholique d'éducation physique et sportive, with women's organizations rapidly following suit and joining the Rayon sportif féminin – a French catholic sporting organisation for women. In contrast to the situation in the North, the spread of sports through the southern regions of Algeria, under the auspices of the White Fathers (Pères Blancs), predominantly involved the indigenous populations.

== Male youth associations ==
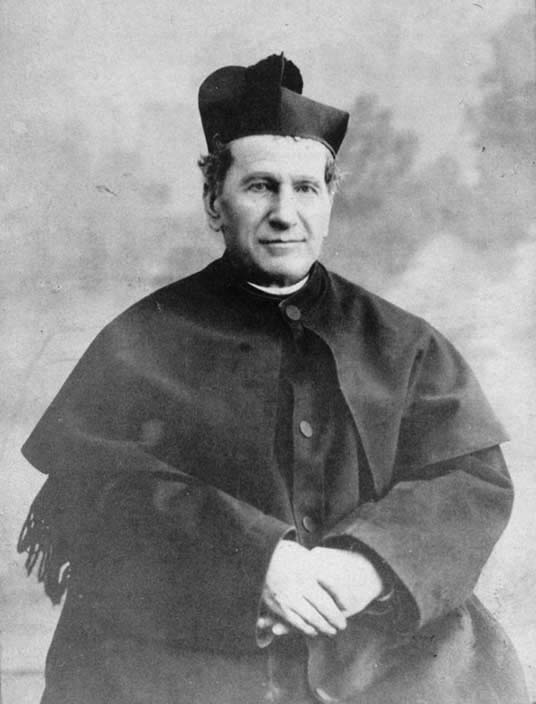
Giovanni Melchior Bosco, known as Saint John Bosco, better known under the alias Don Bosco, photographed by Carlo Felice Deasti, in Turin, in 1887.

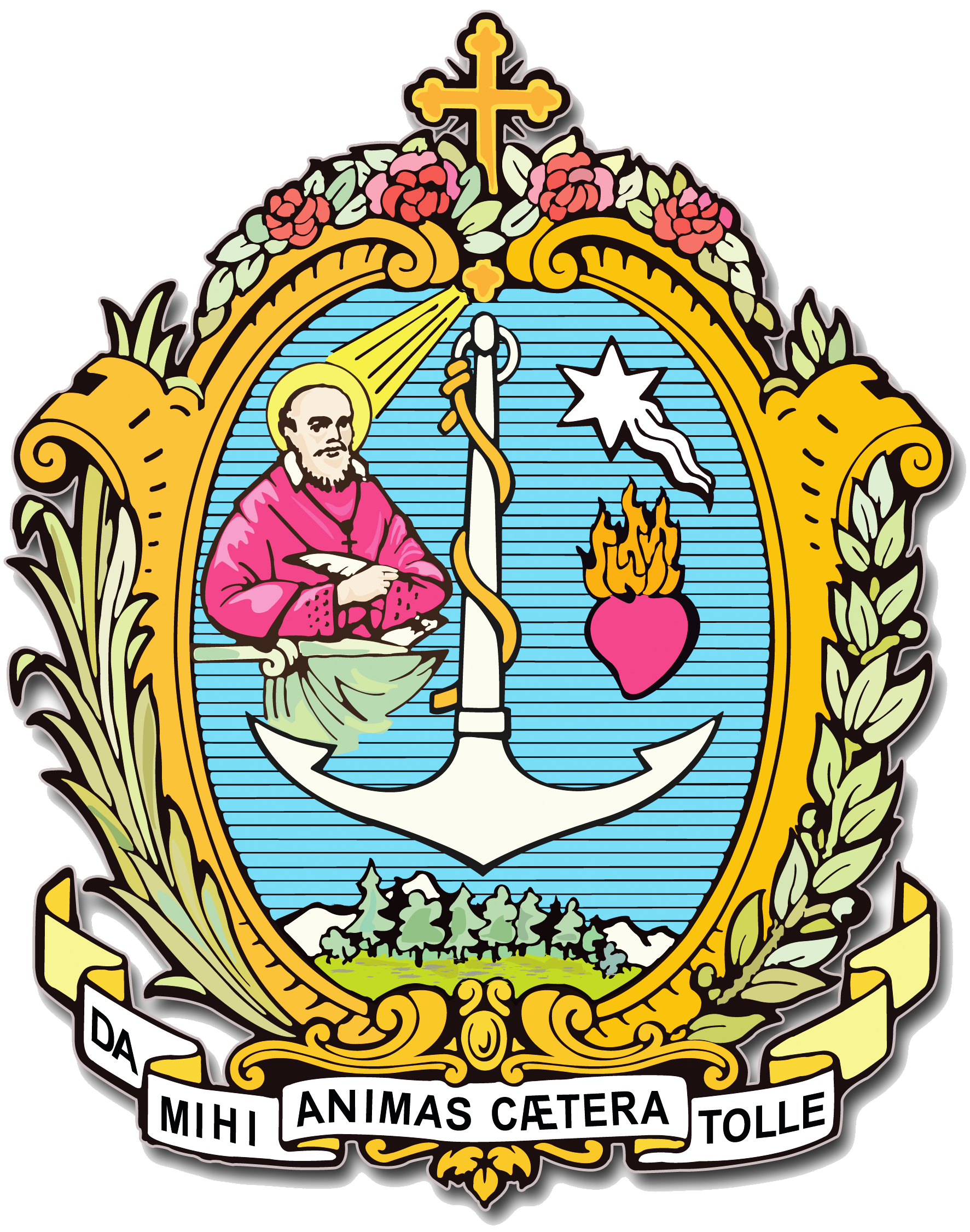
Coat of arms of Salesians referring to Saint John Bosco.

The first of the Catholic youth sports associations were established in Algiers in 1913, namely: St. Croix (which was already involved with working class youth), St. Joseph Hussein Dey, and l’Avenir d’El Biar. They were created through an initiative of the Salesians of Don Bosco and the Congregation of the Sacred Heart of Jesus and catered predominantly to young people of European origin. They immediately became affiliated with the Fédération gymnastique et sportive des patronages de France (FGSPF), and their focus, as with the associations in France, was the provision of moral instruction and military training. They were organised into regional unions in which both religious and secular people, including women, shared responsibilities. (Note: In 1946 the Union régionale d'Oran was chaired by Canon Fabre; with Father Jean, priest of Lourmel, as secretary; a Mr. Perisson as vice president; and a Mr. Fonclair as treasurer. A Eugene Simon was chair of the Regional Union of Algiers in the same year.) The first such union was established in Oran in November 1913 by a Father Koëger.

Development of the associations continued after the First World War: the Union régionale de la province d'Alger listed six associations in 1924, then nine by 1928. France supported and monitored these developments, and following an appeal by Monsignor Auguste-Fernand Leynaud, Archbishop of Algiers, 70 Catholic youth sports associations from various French departments – such as Bouches-du-Rhône, Alsace, Seine, Rhône, Landes, and Maine et Loire – took 3000 gymnasts and 500 musicians across the Mediterranean to participate in a large competition for federation member associations. The competition was organised to mark the centenary of French Algeria and was held on 14 June 1930. Three specially arranged boats set off from Marseille: the Lamoricière, the duc d'Aumale, and the Espagne. On board, the executive team was made up of François Hebrard (a French law professor and leading sports bureaucrat), Armand Thibaudeau (a Catholic youth sports association leader who played an important part in the development of basketball in France), and Mr. Simounet, who was the official representative of the Under Secretary of State for Physical Education. Avant-Garde Saint-Denis was the team of the competition and Robert Herold was the individual champion.

The competition was followed by a reception hosted by the Governor General, Pierre-Louis Borde. Two wreaths were also laid at a war memorial, one by the FGSPF, and the other by a Catholic organisation from Alsace which had brought 11 organisations to the competition. A trip to Sidi-Ferruch followed, where Monsignor Auguste-Fernand Leynaud laid the foundation stone for the city's church; two special trains and 18 buses were laid on for the occasion.

Alger added one further association in 1931, and then in 1932 the Spartans of Eckmülh, (Note: Eckmülh is a district of Oran.) Oran, were created by Father Bailly, who had connections with the Don Bosco youth association, which was founded in January 1893 by the Salesians. The Spartans soon became the largest basketball club in Algeria, with some of the players selected for the France national team. In 1936, Father Bailly's teams won all the titles in the Oran region, with the first team becoming champions of Algeria.

After the Second World War, and as 1948–49 champions of North Africa, the Spartans beat the French military team by 22 points. They then beat the 1949 French champions, Villeurbanne, and were crowned champions of the French Union on 11 June 1949; Oran became the basketball capital of North Africa as a result. After Algerian Independence the Spartans continued their involvement with basketball and gymnastics.

Some of the Algerian associations were ahead of their time. In 1931, the association of St. Philip of Algiers, founded in 1922 and in which sport, such as gymnastics, and military training took place, began to allow female membership, including within their administration. Members had to be of majority age, have French nationality, and be entitled to exercise their civil and political rights however. (Note: However, one should remember that the 1901 law attributes the unenviable status of foreign association to any association whose sole director is a foreigner.)

The Olympique du Petit Séminaire (Note: In English: Little Seminary Olympic.) (OPS) was the last Catholic youth sports association created in Algeria and was founded during the insurgency. (Note: The Olympique du Petit Séminaire was founded on 8 July 1959, via publication in the Journal officiel de l'Algérie (Official Gazette of Algeria) number 167, 22 July 1959.) All those in charge at the OPS belonged to the social elite, and one was a member of the Clergy. In addition to teaching gymnastics and providing military training (including training in the use of rifles), the association encouraged the practice of other sports. It also encouraged choir singing as well as organizing recreational sessions and holiday camps. The association's statutes did not permit the admission of foreigners.

On 27 January 1963, during the year following Algerian independence, the statutes of the OPS were changed: military training was brought to an end and the association was renamed Olympique de Saint-Eugène (OSE), placing less emphasis on religion; membership continued to be made up of French nationals however. The OSE finally ceased to exist in 1967. Prior to this, on 1 July 1962, during the gymnastics and music championships of the Féderation Sportive de France (FSF) in Troyes, a young gymnast and lawyer representing the Algerian unions, Olivier Gilbert, had returned the flag of the Algerian youth associations to the president of the FSF.

== Women's sports ==
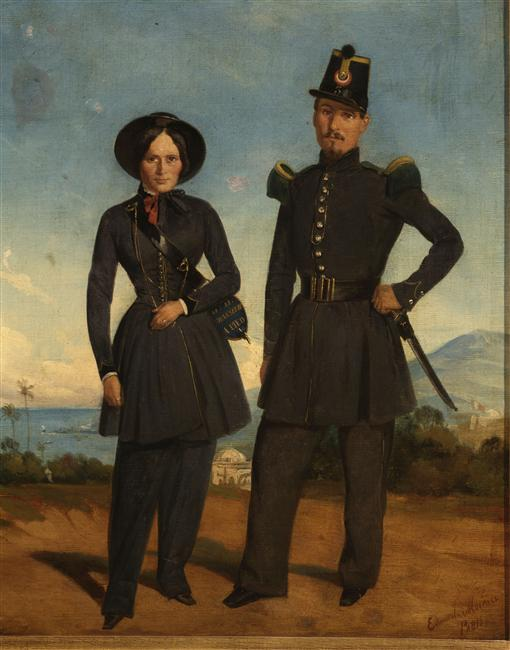
Painting by Edouard Moreau (1825–1878): a female soldier of the French army standing beside a member of the infantry in Algeria, 1845.

Female members of the religious establishment were responsible for the creation of Catholic women's sports associations in Algeria after the First World War; the Dragonflies of the Redoubt, of Birmandreis, were founded in 1926 for example. However, the spread of these associations mainly took place just before the Second World War: the Mouettes Oranaises were founded in Oran in 1938, then the Hirondelles de Notre Dame d’Afrique, the Mouettes, the Mimosas du champ de manœuvre, the Marguerites de Mustapha, the Capucines de Belcourt, the Glycines de Mustapha, the Coquelicots de Mustapha, the Rayon Sportif féminin algérien, the Bleuets d’Alger, the Boutons d’Or de Kouba, the Bruyères d’Hussein Dey and the Cyclamens de Bab El Oued were founded in Algiers the following year.

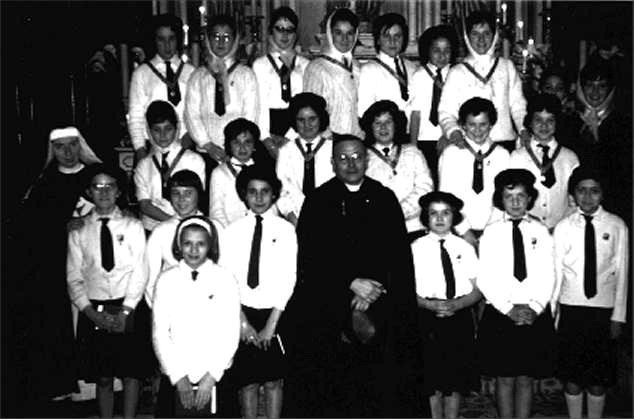
A Catholic women's youth association choir in Mascara, Algeria at a reception ceremony for young cadets from the school of Trinitarian sisters: a Catholic religious order founded in 1194 in Cerfroid, France by two French Saints, Jean de Matha and Saint Felix de Valois. This photo is dated 8 December 1961.

All these associations were affiliated with the Rayon sportif féminin, founded in 1919 by the Daughters of Charity of Saint Vincent de Paul. (Note: In French the Daughters of Charity of Saint Vincent de Paul are also known as both the Filles de la Charité and the Filles de la Charité de Saint Vincent de Paul.) The regional overseas committees of the Rayon sportif féminin were created in 1937, on the initiative of Marie-Thérèse Eyquem. In addition to gymnastics, the sports practised included basketball, volleyball, prisonball, swimming, canoeing, and cycling. In each diocese, the chaplain provided the instructors with spiritual training – which remained the prerogative of the clergy and directors of the associations. The Rayon sportif féminin insisted on leaders and instructors being practising Catholics:

It's not about encouraging them into the church; it's about bringing the church into their lives. (Note: Original French quote: Il ne s’agit pas de les faire entrer à l’église, mais de mettre l’église dans leur vie.)

Like the men's associations, the regional unions of the RSF organized large competitions. These were placed under the authority of the highest ranking colonial officials. A prayer to Joan of Arc was offered at the competitions, together with a flag raising ceremony. The regional unions also provided training sessions for diocese-level association leaders, (Note: First course instructors of the Diocese of Oran, 14 September 1942 thus providing physical education instructors for schools, as well as managers for the youth sports associations,.) supported and supervised through the management framework based in France. It was during a mission to Algiers in this context, during the autumn of 1942, that Eugenie Duisit, Deputy Secretary-General of the FGSPF, the authoritative body for France's zone libre at the time, joined the Free French Forces.

Female Muslim participation in the associations was low, though it increased with the war of independence. Notable examples of those who did participate are: Nini Derdéche Philippeville, the all-round French cross country runner-up in 1956, and Lila Khelif from Algiers, Algerian 1956 junior 800m, shot put, and javelin champion. Catholic female youth sports associations, which for so long had been the exclusive reserve of Europeans, nevertheless largely ceased to exist with the arrival of Algerian independence.

== Southern territories ==
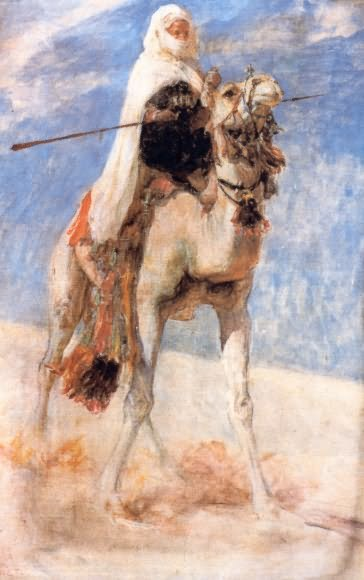
Méhariste, on his méhari, (Note: Méhara was originally an Arabic masculine singular noun used in North Africa to refer to dromedary camels. As it acquired its modern sense the singular form became méhari, with the plural form eventually becoming méhara or, optionally, méharis. The modern word refers to a camel which is ridden by a méhariste, a person who rides a méhari or méhara for the purpose of travel through the desert. Méhara dromedaries are taller and slimmer than dromedaries used as pack animals. They are supremely noble animals, svelte, proud in appearance, and with a coat of white fur. They are animals for riding, suitable for razzias (military raids) and racing, and originate from Algeria.) painted around 1887: oil on canvas by Étienne Dinet (1861–1929).

Though the north of Algeria was divided into three French Algerian departments from 1902 (Algiers, Oran, and Constantine), Southern Algeria was made up of four militarily administered areas (Ghardaïa, Ain Sefra, Touggourt, and Oasis (whose seat was in Adrar); fr) until the statute of 20 September 1947 gave these areas department status as well. Up until that time, the French Foreign Legion, the African battalions and the Saharan Méharistes (a kind of French cavalry, but with camels rather than horses) had been responsible for introducing participation sport to the South: they had indigenous people build tennis courts, additional to those already in existence at the larger hotels. This only contributed to a limited extent to the spread of participation sport amongst the indigenous population however. It was mainly down to another institution, one which often had a close and complementary relationship with the military, to achieve that on a significant scale.

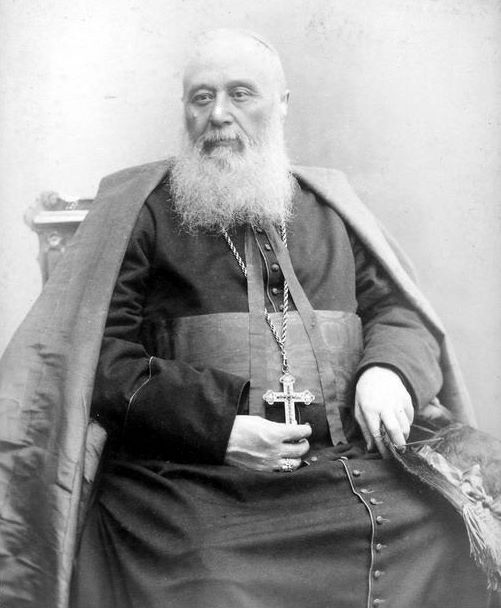
Cardinal Charles Martial Lavigerie (1825–1892), Archbishop of Algiers and founder of the Order of the White Fathers – official name: Missionaries of Africa – which was initiated in 1868, in Maison-Carrée, now named El Harrach, Algeria. This photograph was taken by Albert Capelle, in Paris, France, in 1882.

Cardinal Charles Martial Lavigerie, professor of ecclesiastical history at the Sorbonne from 1854 to 1856, then bishop of Nancy in 1863, was appointed Bishop of Algiers in 1867. His outstanding management of the cholera outbreak which occurred there earned him great popularity amongst the Muslim population. Named Primate of Africa and the apostolic delegate for Sahara and the Sudan by Pius IX in 1884, he founded the Missionary Society of the White Fathers to work with the tribes of M'zab. They cared for the sick, evangelized, and provided schooling for children. The creation of sports associations, in addition to clinics and schools, enabled daily contact with young people, and from 1884 the White Fathers were already playing a role in the spread of sport; firstly amongst the local Kabyle populations, then throughout the wider southern region.

Members of the religious establishment, in conjunction with the military, very quickly began organizing méhari races (a méhari is a type of camel.). In 1890 Monsignor Lavigerie established the annual Touggourt-Biskra long distance race: (Note: (in Arabic) Biskra–Arabic: بسكرة) 220 km and a first prize of 1000 francs. Its continued success led, in 1934, to government regulation of gambling associated with the event:

From March 31, 1898, the betting rules applicable to horse racing, and amendments applicable in Algeria, will be applicable, in so far as they do not contravene existing laws, to racing involving donkeys or camels. (Note: Original French quote: Le règlement du pari mutuel concernant les courses de chevaux du 31 mars 1898 et ses modifications applicables en Algérie seront, en ce qu’ils ne sont pas contraires aux présentes dispositions, applicables aux courses d’ânes et de méhara.)

— Governor General Jules Carde, circular 7262, promulgated on 30 June 1934.

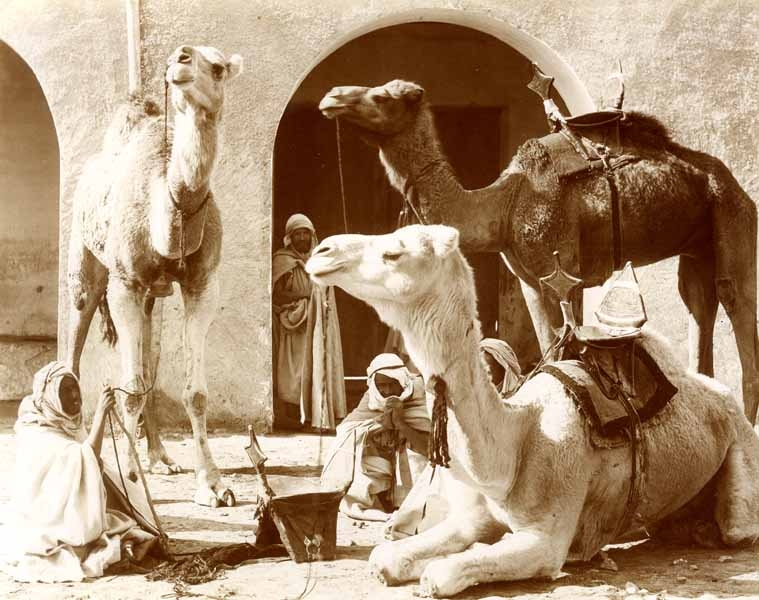
Méhari, photographed by Auguste Maure, in Biskra, 1880.

As was the case in the northern cities, traditional sports developed significantly in the South – from an institutional point of view – between the two world wars. In 1928, the Union sportive et de préparation militaire de Laghouat (Sports and Military Training Union of Laghouat) (Note: Created on 23 June and approved on 8 March 1929, under reference number 13202.) attempted to unify the French, Jewish and Arabic sections of the local community. Amongst the twelve members of the board of directors there were four Muslims. Military training was stopped After 1941 and the institution became the Union sportive de Laghouat (USL), (English: Athletic Union of Laghouat).

The Société sportive saharienne (SSS), (English:Saharan Sports Association) was listed in the Journal officiel de l'Algérie (Official Gazette of Algeria) on 15 November 1938. Its president was Rev. Lethielleux, a superior within the White Fathers. The association had two basketball teams, two football teams, and 40 trainees in the 10–15 age range.

But unforeseen problems surfaced. The association la Vie au Grand Air (Note: Established 6 December 1936.) in Geryville (now El Bayadh), which offered athletics, football, and basketball, had three Muslims amongst its 11 board members. But power-sharing proved problematic, and two further associations were formed in 1939: l'Union sportive geryvilloise (Geryville Athletic Union) led by the Agha Si Larbi Ben Din, head of the zaouïa of the Oualed Sidi Cheikh and Knight of the Legion of Honor, and the Étoile du sud (Note: In English: Star of the South.) under the leadership of the White Fathers. Legislation introduced by the Vichy regime, however, led to the dissolution of these associations on 1 March 1941, and the re-establishment of a single association: the Stade Gérivyllois (Gerivylle Stadium), with the superior of the White Fathers continuing as vice-president.

Due to the efforts of the White Fathers and the military, the sahrawi people of the South also began participating in organised sport, even though it had been established primarily for Europeans in the northern cities. The settled population gained access to participation sports – mainly football – and the official authorities properly organised and managed the traditional physical pursuits of the nomadic Bedouin.

== Bibliography ==
- Fatès, Youssef; Combeau-Mari, Évelyne (October 2004). Algérie coloniale : les patronages et le sport [French colonial Algeria: Catholic youth associations and sport] (in French). Le Publieur. pp. 203–218. ISBN 978-2-35061-000-9.
- Fatès, Youssef (February 2009). Sport et politique en Algérie [Sport and politics in Algeria] (in French). Paris: L'Harmattan. ISBN 978-2-296-07865-9.
- Hervet, Robert (1948). La Fédération Sportive de France (1898–1948) [The French Sports Federation (1898 to 1948)] (in French). François Hebrard. Paris: Fédération Sportive de France. OCLC 953688708. HER1948.
