= Fédération internationale catholique d'éducation physique et sportive =

The Fédération internationale catholique d'éducation physique et sportive (FICEP) is an international nongovernmental organization (INGO) which governs all Catholic sports associations. The FICEP was founded between 1906 and 1911, under the auspices of the Italian federation FASCI, the Belgium federation FBCG, and the Fédération sportive et culturelle de France. Its development has mainly been confined to Europe, in spite of various and recurrent attempts to increase its geographical expansion after World War II.

== History ==
=== UIOCEP ===
In 1906, the Fédération gymnastique et sportive des patronages de France (FGSPF), the Fédération belge catholique de gymnastique (FBCG) and the FASCA (Italy) took the first steps in encouraging the practice of sports throughout the various catholic federations.

In 1908, under the auspices of Pope Pius X, in Rome, the association brought together about 2,000 participants; they came from all over the world, including: France, Belgium, Ireland, Canada and Italy.

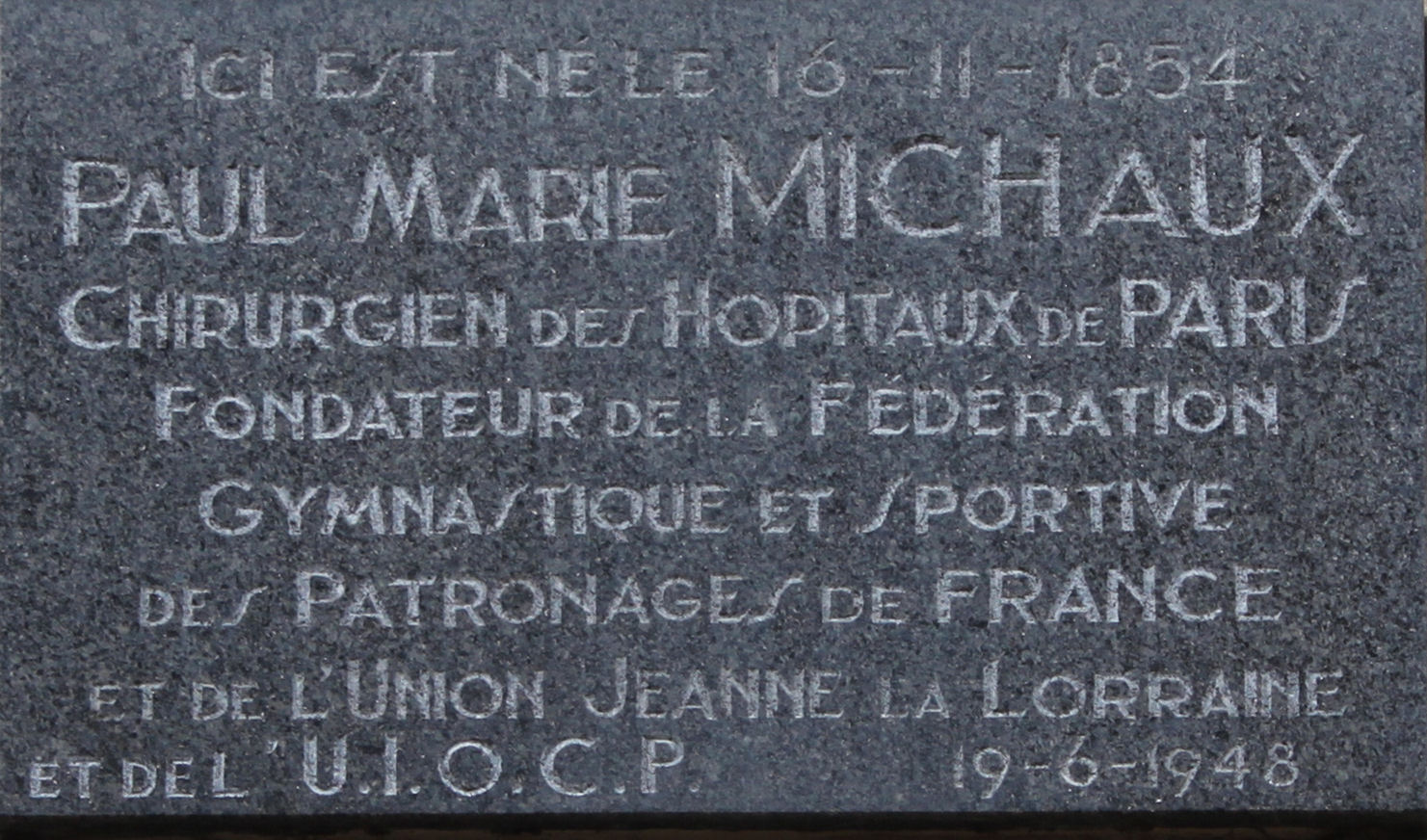
Memorial plaque at the birthplace of Dr. Paul Michaux, located at 8 rue Mazelle, in Metz, France.

In 1911, at the international gymnastics competition in Nancy (France), the creation of the International Union was the result of an initiative from Dr. Paul Michaux, who is the founder and the president of the Fédération gymnastique et sportive des patronages de France. There is a plaque (Note: It may be duly noted, on the writing of the aforesaid memorial plaque (→ see picture above), that the intermediate "E" is curiously missing from all engraved letters relating to the comprehensive acronym of the U.I.O.C.E.P.), which commemorates this event; it is added to the facade of the birthplace of Dr. Paul Michaux; it is located at number 8 of rue Mazelle, in Metz, (France). The original designation of the new institution – as it was established under the chairmanship of Count Mario di Carpegna – is named Union internationale des œuvres catholiques d'éducation physique. The Baron de Dieudonné (from Belgium) and Dr. Paul Michaux are elected as vice-presidents of the aforesaid UIOCEP; Charles Simon is confirmed in his General Secretary nomination and it is agreed that the head office would be that of FGSPF, located at Place Saint-Thomas d'Aquin 5, Paris, France.

December 13 – 14, 1911: all statutes and regulations are finalized and duly ratified in Rome.

At the end of year 1913, the first General Assembly of the association of athletes was held in Rome.

In 1920, the acceptance of Germany (DJK) is considered as being irrelevant by Alsatian members, given that the Avant-garde du Rhin had joined the FSGPF during the previous year. Thus, much diplomatic sense is required from Paul Michaux, in order to allow him to persuade his friend Auguste Biecheler of the potential merits relating to such an unconventional approach. That same year the presidency is entrusted to F. Van de Kerkhove.

Since 1922, the possibility of including women in the sports world begins to grow in the Catholic memberships of OREL (Czechoslovakia) which has already accepted women as being part and parcel of their inner structures. This question, endlessly debated, will not manage to find any satisfying outcome, at least, not before the emergence of the war; thus, the UIOCEP remains resolutely made of male people.

In 1927, the DJK is finally accepted, after the signing of the Treaty of Locarno, given that, henceforth, the detailed rules for the application are in the position to allow the accession of Germany to the League of Nations.

==== Leaders ====
===== Speakers =====
- 1911–1919 Mario di Carpegna – Italy
- 1919–1931 Felix Van De Kerkhove – Belgium
- 1931–1947 François Hébrard – France

===== Secretaries =====
- 1911–1915 Charles Simon – France
- 1919–1947 Armand Thibaudeau – France

=== FICEP ===
On January 6, 1947, in Zurich (Switzerland) the acronym UIOCEP was altered; it is then known under the name of FICEP. François Hebrard is elected president and Armand Thibaudeau is nominated as a Secretary General of the aforesaid federation. The technical committee is entrusted to Gabriel Maucurier and a women's commission is eventually created with Marie-Thérèse Eyquem as president. The main seat remains the legacy of the FGSPF (France), which is newly baptized under the denomination of Fédération sportive française (FSF) during that same year 1947, in Paris. The former attempts which were aimed to extend its geographic spreading after the World War II have had little effect: like the UIOCEP, the F.I.C.E.P. tends to remain fundamentally linked to its European roots.

In 1960, the semantic unit Fédération internationale catholique d'éducation physique is renamed; it is then known under the following name: Fédération internationale catholique d'éducation physique et sportive. Notwithstanding the above addition, the acronym FICEP has remained unchanged over the forthcoming years.

In 1973, the first international camp brought together young people from various affiliated federations. Since then the event has been held annually, in a different country each year.

In 1980 the FICEP was recognized as an international catholic organization (ICO) by the Pontifical Council for secular (CPL). The United Nations Educational, Scientific and Cultural Organization (UNESCO) has granted status A to its intrinsic development, which means that, it is officially recognized as an international nongovernmental organization (INGO). As such, it participate, as an observer, at the international meetings which are held at the United Nations.

In late April 2011 the FICEP commemorated its 100th anniversary in Nancy, France.

==== Leaders ====
===== Speakers =====
- 1947–1954: François Hebrard – France
- 1954–1975: Marinus Antonius Arnoldus Van Gool – Netherlands
- 1975–1991: Josef Finder – Austria
- 1991–1998: Achilles Diegenant – Belgium
- 1998–2003: Dick Wijte – Netherlands
- 2003–2009: Clement Schertzinger – France
- 2009–2011: Elke Haider – Germany
- Since 2011: Anne Cordier – France (Note: Fédération sportive et culturelle de France – Headlines The General Assembly of the F.I.C.E.P. occurred in Kraków, Poland, on April 9 & 10, 2010. In his public speech, M. Jean Vintzel, president of the Fédération sportive et culturelle de France, stated as follows: The General Assembly of the F.I.C.E.P. (Fédération internationale catholique d'éducation physique et sportive) offers Anne Cordier to join the Steering Committee of the F.I.C.E.P., in order to allow her forthcoming nomination to the post of deputy general secretary, replacing Michel Rocolle – cf. p. 3, paragraph entitled: F.I.C.E.P.) (Note: Fédération sportive et culturelle de France – Flash infos Assemblée générale de la F.I.C.E.P., en date des 9 & 10 avril 2010, à Cracovie – Pologne : L'assemblée générale de la F.I.C.E.P. (Fédération internationale catholique d'éducation physique et sportive) propose qu'Anne Cordier intègre le Comité directeur de l'institution au poste de secrétaire générale adjointe, en remplacement de Michel Rocolle – cf. p. 3 – paragraphe intitulé : F.I.C.E.P. (in French))

===== Secretaries =====
- 1947–1954: Armand Thibaudeau – France
- 1954–1991: Robert Pringarbe – France
- 1991–1999: Jacques Gautheron – France
- 1999–2003: Clement Schertzinger – France
- 2003–2007: Smoly Fritz – Austria
- 2008–2011: Rosslhuber Rainer – Austria

=== Member States ===
Early 2011, the FICEP has included thirteen countries, which are:

- German: Deutsche Jugend Kraft – DJK
- Austria: Sportunion
- Belgium: Gym & Dans
- Cameroon: Centre Sportif Camerounais – CSC
- France: Fédération sportive et culturelle de France – FSCF
- Italy: Centro Sportivo Italiano (CSI)
- Madagascar: Madagaskar Fitaizana ny Herin'ny zatovo malagasy – FIHEZAMA
- Netherlands: Thomas van Aquino – TVA
- Poland: Katolickie Stowarzyszenie Sportowe Rzeczpospolitej Polskiej – KSS RP
- Czech Republic: OREL
- Romania: Clubul Sportiv Roman – CSR, associate member of the FICEP (since April 2011)
- Slovakia: OROL
- Switzerland: Swiss Athletic Union

== See also ==
- Gymnastic and Sports Federation of French Patronages
