= Dương Tử Giang =

Vietnamese writer (1915–1956)

- Born: Nguyễn Tấn Sĩ; 15 March 1915; Giồng Trôm, Bến Tre, French Indochina
- Died: 2 December 1956 (aged 41); Biên Hoà, South Vietnam
- Occupations: Journalist, writer, playwright

Dương Tử Giang (1915–1956; born as Nguyễn Tấn Sĩ) was a Vietnamese writer, journalist, playwright and revolutionary.

He was known for his patriotic activities against the invasion of France during the First Indochina War and against the pro-US Saigon government during the Vietnam War.

His pen-name Dương Tử Giang (揚子江) means "Yangtze River".

A street in current Ho Chi Minh City was named after Dương Tử Giang. An awards named Dương Tử Giang was also established for meritorious journalists in Đồng Nai province.

== Childhood and pre-1945 activities ==
Dương Tử Giang was born as Nguyễn Tấn Sĩ in Giồng Trôm or Nhơn Thạnh district, Bến Tre province, from a well-to-do landowner family. His birthday was recorded as 15 March 1915, although some sources claimed his birth year was 1914 with unknown date. He attended highschool in Mỹ Tho and managed to finish the Indochina upper primary level together with two Brevet diploma in 1933. He did not planned to finish highschool program, however, and dropped school to open a small bookstore and barbershop in Mỹ Tho. He began to be involved in literature and arts during this time, wrote several novels including "Pathology" (1937) and "Chicken and dog" (1939). In 1936 established a tuồng troupe due to his interest in this kind of theatre art. However the troupe ended up in debts end eventual bankrupt due to Giang's poor business experience and also to the play's novel theme which was unfamiliar with contemporary viewers. He later worked as a teacher at Thủ Đức Primary school (Saigon), and a secretary at Hà Tiên Department of Commerce. He got addicted to cockfight and was accused of fund misappropriation. He then fled to the Tà Lơn mountain until the 1944 Japan coup in Indochina.

Dương Tử Giang was exposed to the miserable life of common people during his various relocation at that time, which intensified his hatred toward foreign power's colonial rule in Indochina. Returned to Saigon, Dương Tử Giang took part in journalism to express his patriotic messages. From 1943 to 1944 he wrote for the newspapers "Public opinion" of Dương Trung Thực, "Tomorrow" of Đào Trinh Nhất, "Living" of Đông Hồ and Trúc Hà, "Youth" of Huỳnh Tấn Phát, and "Happiness" of Lê Tràng Kiều, Hồ Tăng Ấn và Nguyễn Bính. During the huge 1944 inflation in Indochina, Dương Tử Giang wrote an article on the "Happiness" newspaper, strongly criticized the monetary policy of Japanese-controlled authorities and called for a popular uprising. The newspaper was inevitably closed and its owner was summoned to court. It was the first time, and not the only time, a newspaper was closed due to Dương Tử Giang's patriotic theme in his articles.

== After August Revolution and during the First Indochina War ==
Dương Tử Giang continued his journalism career after the August Revolution, this time to support the independence of the Democratic Republic of Vietnam (DRV) and its resistance war against France during the First Indochina War. Together with Vũ Tùng and Thiếu Sơn, Dương Tử Giang joined Justice, an institute of the French Section of the Workers' International (SFIO) in Indochina. He first wrote for DRV newspapers "New Youth" and "Tomorrow", and since November 1946 he established the newspaper "Culture" to criticize the pro-French Saigon governments and express support to Viet Minh and Ho Chi Minh. The newspaper was forced to closed in early 1947 due to an article openly criticized the French invasion and war crimes against Vietnamese people. Dương Tử Giang himself was imprisoned in the Catinat facility of Maison Centrale de Saigon. In the prison he took part in the organization of two secret newspapers "Voices of Prison" and "Nights in the Maison Centrale". Released after three months, Dương Tử Giang had Lý Vĩnh Khuôn established the newspaper "Today... Tomorrow", which was also forced to close after an article openly praised Hồ Chí Minh in its cover page. In March 1948, Dương Tử Giang worked for "Justice", another short-lived anti-French newspaper led by Fernand le Gros. He wrote for another short-lived "Em" in August 1948, which also was forced to close in November due to Dương Tử Giang's anti-French articles. In January 1949, the newspaper "Việt Báo" received a harsh warning from the pro-French authorities, again because of the same reason.

In May 1950, due to Dương Tử Giang's anti-French speech at the funeral of Nam Quốc Cang (a journalist allegedly assassinated by French secret agents), the pro-French Saigon regime put a warrant on him. Unable to conduct legal activities in Saigon, Dương Tử Giang relocated to Viet Minh controlled areas and, together with Thiếu Sơn, wrote for Viet Minh's "National Salvation" newspaper. He also took part in Viet Minh's cultural and art activities, and wrote several tuồng plays.

== After the 1954 Geneva Accord and death ==
After the 1954 Geneva Accord Dương Tử Giang together with Thiếu Sơn, Lý Văn Sâm, and others, was tasked to keep their journalism career in Saigon, at that time still under a pro-French and then pro-America government. Despite financial difficulties and issues in private life, Dương Tử Giang resumed his activities with high vigor. He establish the "Common people" newspaper, and wrote for the "Justice", "Telegram", and "Modernization", with similar theme of patriotism, left-leaning, and unification of Vietnam. Dương Tử Giang's activities attracted hostilities from the anti-communist Ngô Đình Diệm regime and he was arrested on 8 October 1955 with the accusation of being a Communist. He was interrogated, tortured, and imprisoned first in Catinat facility, then in Tân Hiệp prison in Biên Hoà. In prison Dương Tử Giang continued his revolutionary activities, he took part in political propaganda and various arts, cultural and literature activities for the prison inmates. He wrote a patriotic cải lương play named "Debt for nation" during the imprisonment.

Dương Tử Giang, together with his close friend Lý Văn Sâm, took part in a huge prison breakout on 2 December 1956, organized by local Communist committee among the prison inmates. The successful breakout managed to release 500 political prisoners, but Dương Tử Giang was fatally shot and died from his wound during the escape, at the age of 41.

== Commemoration ==
A street in current Ho Chi Minh City was named after Dương Tử Giang. An awards named Dương Tử Giang was also established for meritable journalists in Đồng Nai province.

== Family ==
Dương Tử Giang got married in 1940 at had at least one daughter.

== Notable works ==
- Bịnh học ("Pathology", novel 1937)
- Con gà và con chó ("Chicken and dog", novel, 1939)
- Tranh đấu ("Struggle", novel, 1949)
- Một vũ trụ sụp đổ ("A collapsing universe", novel, 1949)
- Cô Sáu Tầu Thưng (1949)
- Vè Bảo Đại (1950)
- Trương Phi thủ Cổ thành ("Zhang Fei defending Gucheng", tuồng play)
- Nửa đêm về sáng ("From midnight to sunrise", short story)
- Nguyễn Trung Trực quy thần (tuồng play)
- Ký Charton và Le Page (tuồng play)
