= Paul Alfred Pételot =

French botanist

- Born: 1885; Saint-Max, France
- Died: 1965 (aged 79–80)
- Scientific career
- Fields: Botany, Entomology
- Institutions: Nancy-Université; Faculté Mixte de Médecine et de Pharmacie, Saigon; Institute of Agronomic Research, Saigon
- Author abbrev. (botany): Pételot

Paul Alfred Pételot (1885–1965) was a French botanist and entomologist, whose primary scholarly focus was on medicinal plants in Southeast Asia. Some sources list his date of death as 1940, but several herbaria specimens are recorded as being collected by him up until 1944 including Carex kucyniakii (1944), Teijsmanniodendron peteloti (1941), Amalocalyx microlobus (1941), Amalocalyx microlobus (1942), Trichosanthes kerrii (1944) and Siraitia siamensis (1944). In addition, he continued to author publications through the 1950s, though it is possible these are posthumous.

== Life ==
Pételot was born in Saint-Max, France in 1885. His first professional posting was in 1908 as a member of the botany faculty at Nancy-Université. He then worked in Brazil and St. Petersburg, Russia before returning to France. In 1919 he was working in the cryptogamy department of the French National Museum of Natural History (Muséum National d'Histoire Naturelle) and had been accepted as a member of the French Society of Plant Pathology (Société de Pathologie végétale de France) and the Botanical Society of France (Societe Botanique de France). He then moved to Southeast Asia and in 1922 joined the entomological station of Cho-Gank (Tonkin) and became a professor at the Hanoi School of Agriculture. He moved to Saigon to become a lecturer at the Mixed Faculty of Medicine and Pharmacy (Faculté Mixte de Médecine et de Pharmacie) and then led the botanical division of the Scientific and Technical Research Center (Centre de Recherches Scientifiques et Techniques). He was elected as a laureate of the French Academy of Sciences (Académie des sciences).

== Work ==
He collected a large number of botanical specimens from Southeast Asia which have been deposited in the French National Museum of Natural History.

The standard author abbreviation Pételot is used to indicate this person as the author when citing a botanical name.

== Legacy ==
He is the authority on botanical taxa including: IPNI. List of plant names with authority Pételot .

Several taxa are named in his honor including:

- Petelotiella Gagnep.
- Aganosma petelotii Lý
- Allophylus petelotii Merr.
- Ardisia petelotii E.Walker
- Arisaema petelotii K.Krause
- Aristolochia petelotii O.C.Schmidt
- Artabotrys petelotii Merr.
- Artocarpus petelotii Gagnep.
- Asarum petelotii O.C.Schmidt
- Callicarpa petelotii Dop
- Camellia petelotii (Merr.) Sealy
- Carex petelotii Gross
- Casearia petelotii Merr.
- Cleistanthus petelotii Merr. ex Croizat
- Clethra Petelotii Dop & Troch.-Marq.
- Cryptochilus petelotii Gagnep.
- Digitaria petelotii Henrard
- Dioscorea petelotii Prain & Burkill
- Disepalum petelotii (Merr.) D.M.Johnson
- Dracontomelon petelotii Tardieu
- Elaeocarpus petelotii Merr.
- Elatostema petelotii Gagnep.
- Elytranthe petelotii Merr.
- Eremochloa petelotii Merr.
- Fosbergia petelotii Merr. ex Tirveng. & Sastre
- Glycosmis petelotii Guillaumin
- Habenaria petelotii Gagnep.
- Helicia petelotii Merr.
- Heptapleurum petelotii (Merr.) G.M.Plunkett & Lowry
- Homalium petelotii Merr.
- Hydrocotyle petelotii Tardieu
- Illicium petelotii A.C.Sm.
- Indocalamus petelotii (A.Camus) Ohrnb.
- Isachne petelotii A.Camus
- Lecanthus petelotii (Gagnep.) C.J.Chen
- Liparis petelotii Gagnep.
- Lithocarpus petelotii A.Camus
- Lysimachia petelotii Merr.
- Lysionotus petelotii Pellegr.
- Medinilla petelotii Merr.
- Microtropis petelotii Merr. & F.L.Freeman
- Mitrephora petelotii Weeras. & R.M.K.Saunders
- Paramignya petelotii Guillaumin
- Pedicularis petelotii P.C.Tsoong
- Phyllanthus petelotii Croizat
- Phyllocyclus petelotii (Merr.) Thiv
- Pogostemon petelotii Doan ex Gang Yao, Y.F.Deng & X.J.Ge
- Primula petelotii W.W.Sm.
- Quercus petelotii A.Camus
- Raphiocarpus petelotii (Pellegr.) B.L.Burtt
- Scirpus petelotii Gross
- Selaginella petelotii Alston
- Smilax petelotii T.Koyama
- Sporoxeia petelotii (Merr.) C.Hansen
- Staurogyne petelotii Benoist
- Teucrium petelotii Doan ex Suddee & A.J.Paton
- Thelypteris petelotii Ching
- Vaccinium petelotii Merr.
- Viola petelotii W.Becker ex Gagnep.
