= Thiếu Sơn =

Vietnamese writer

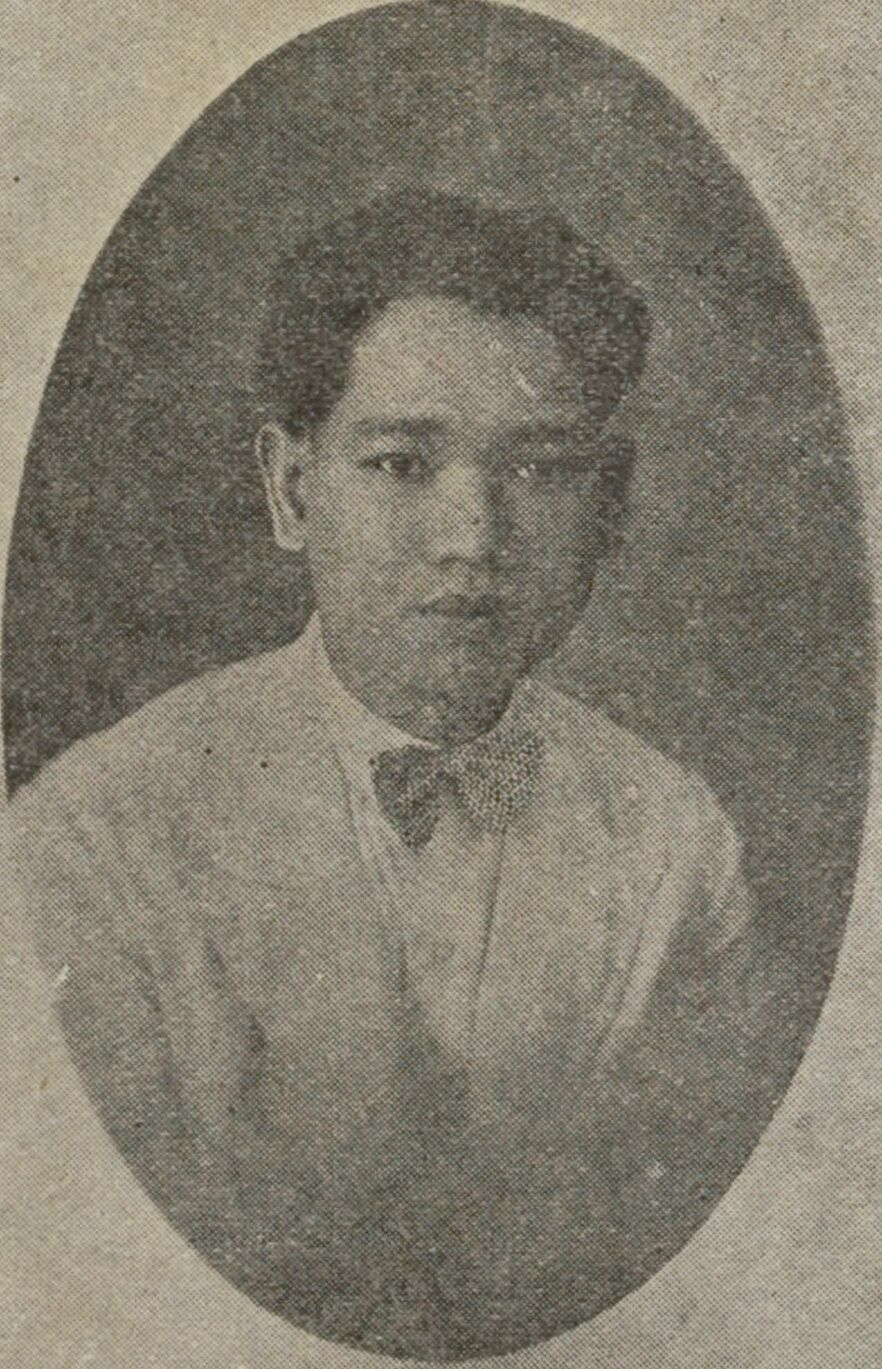
- Thiếu Sơn
- Born: Lê Sĩ Quý; 1908; Hải Dương, French Indochina
- Died: 1978; Ho Chi Minh City, Vietnam
- Occupation: Writer, Journalist, Literary critic
- Notable works: Phê bình và cảo luận (Criticism and rough dissertation)

Thiếu Sơn (1908–1978), birth name: Lê Sĩ Quý, was a Vietnamese writer, journalist, literary critic and revolutionary.

As a literary critics, he was known for his magnum opus Phê bình và cảo luận (Criticism and rough dissertation) (1933). He was considered the pioneer of literary criticism using the Vietnamese alphabet, and also pioneer of personality reviews of notable writers.

During the Indochina War and Vietnam War, he worked as a leftist activist who supported the resistance effort of Democratic Republic of Vietnam against the invasion of France and United States.

== Childhood and pre-1945 activities ==
Thiếu Sơn was born as Lê Sĩ Quý in 1908 in Hải Dương, French Indochina. Other documents claimed his birthplace was Hanoi. Due to distance in time and a spatial turbulence childhood, even Lê Sĩ Quý and his relatives failed to remember his exact birthday and birthplace.

Lê Sĩ Quý was a son government officer worked as a verbal translator for the Palace of Resident-Superior of Tonkin, specialized in the Mountainous Area. Lê Sĩ Quý's father was not a faithful husband, he abandoned Quý's birth mother and married two more times. Due to work demands, Quý's family frequently relocated across mountainous provinces in northern Vietnam, disrupting his education many times. Moreover, Quý's health in his childhood had always been poor, and his father's income as a petty government officer was mediocre. Therefore, despite being a bright student, he only managed to finish upper primary school in 1927 and failed to finish highschool education. Nonetheless, Quý passed the 1929 bureaucrat examination with flying colors and began worked at Gia Định Post Office in 1930.

Lê Sĩ Quý began his active literary activities in the 1930s, during the blooming of literary movement in Southern Vietnam, with the penname Thiếu Sơn (少山), meaning "Mountain of Youth" or "Young Mountain". The penname "Thiếu Sơn" expressed his favour for a stability and eternal "like a mountain" but also for the vividity and vigor "of the youth". From the very beginning, Thiếu Sơn's literary reviews was highly praised by the literary experts and appeared on many popular newspaper at that time, including the famous Phụ nữ tân văn (婦女新聞, Newspaper of Women) who published his reviews about its own editor. In 1933, Thiếu Sơn published his magnum opus, Phê bình và cảo luận (Criticism and rough dissertation), a collection of his early review essays. The collection received critical acclaim from the readers and established Thiếu Sơn as not only the pioneer of modern literary critics in Vietnam but also the pioneer of personality reviews of notable writers. Encouraged by the early successes, Thiếu Sơn proceeded his career in literature critics and continued to produce valuable reviews, later compiled in an equally acclaimed collection Câu chuyện văn học (The story of literature, 1943).

A notable review of Thiếu Sơn, "Two opinions in literature" (1935), unintentionally sparked a heated debate between the "two opinions" Art for art's sake and Art for life's sake in Vietnam during the late 1930s. Thiếu Sơn nominally supported the "Art for art's sake", but he himself had no enthusiasm in the debate and quickly diverted his attention to other issues.

Beside literature, Thiếu Sơn also wrote reviews about social life and human personality like the work Đời sống tinh thần (The Spiritual Life, 1945) which received the Alexandre de Rhodes Rewards. He also wrote some novels and short stories, including Người bạn gái (The girlfriend, 1941) but was poorly received.

== Revolutionary and patriotic activities during the First Indochina War ==
In the wake of 1940 Cochinchina uprising, French authorities retaliated with brutal suppression. All government officers were forced to take the oath of loyalty. Thiếu Sơn refused to do so and submitted a letter of resignation, but was instead relocated to Saigon Post Office. The event deepened his patriotic and anti-colonialism sentiments. The successful 1945 August Revolution further encouraged Thiếu Sơn to take part in revolutionary and patriotic activities. He cooperated for Justice, a newspaper of French Socialist Party who supported Vietnam's independence, and joined the French Section of the Workers' International (SFIO) on 15 December 1945, worked as Secretary for Vietnamese SFIO members. He pressed for the proper execution of the Temporal Agreement of 14 Sep 1946. Thiếu Sơn wrote another letter of resignation to protest the Oath of Allegiance Ceremony enforced by the pro-France Autonomous Republic of Cochinchina in December 1946, and the third one on 19 December 1946 when First Indochina War broke out, openly refused to be a collaborator of French government.

As a journalist for the Justice, Thiếu Sơn wrote many articles sharply crictizing France's policy in Vietnam, which was collected in the compilation Giữa hai cuộc cách mạng 1847 và 1945 (Between the 1847 and 1945 revolutions, 1947). In 1948, the pro-French Provisional Central Government of Vietnam attempted to propose Thiếu Sơn a ministerial post, but he refused categorically. In 1949, accepting the invitation of Viet Minh general Nguyễn Bình, Thiếu Sơn made a visiting tour in Viet Minh's controlled area in Đồng Tháp Mười and met many well-known Vietnamese intellectuals there, including Phạm Thiều and Ca Văn Thỉnh. He also arranged the meeting of French socialist leader Alain Savary, member of French Union Council, with the Viet Minh's Administrative Committee of Resistance Forces in Southern Vietnam, in the same year. As a result, the pro-French authorities arrested Thiếu Sơn, accused him as a "Communist agent", but was forced to release him under the pressure of leftist activists. Thiếu Sơn continued his patriotic and anti-colonialism activities after his release. He established the Association of Intellectual Labourer in Southern Vietnam. Together with Trịnh Đình Thảo, he arranged the meeting of Georges Duhamel with 100 well-known Vietnamese intellectuals to informed the French people about patriotic war of Vietnamese people against French invasion. The meeting attracted hostile attention from the pro-French authorities and Thiếu Sơn was summoned by the Security Department for further interrogation.

Seeing Justice as a threat to France's activities in Vietnam, the authorities enforced a suppression against the newspaper. Progressive members like Valère and Hervochon was sent back to France. Unable to cooperate with the pro-French remaining members, Thiếu Sơn together with Vũ Tùng, Dương Tử Giang and other colleagues decided to left Saigon for Viet Minh. He and arrived at Viet Minh's controlled area in July 1949 and worked at Viet Minh's Voice of Southern Vietnam, then became the editor of newspaper Cứu quốc (National Salvation) in 1950. His articles received positive acclaim from the readers and was frequently invited by the local people to discuss about contemporary events or to attend important ceremonies. Thiếu Sơn's articles was published by the Central Office for South Vietnam in the 1951 compilation Những người làm nên lịch sử (The people who make history).

== Revolutionary and patriotic activities during the Vietnam War ==
Thiếu Sơn was tasked to continue his work in South Vietnam after the 1954 Geneva Accord, and he arrived at Saigon in May 1955. Together with Vũ Tùng, Dương Tử Giang, Lý Văn Sâm and others, Thiếu Sơn published many articles praising the Viet Minh leaders and their deeds during the Indochina War. His activities again attracted the hositility of anti-communist regime of Ngô Đình Diệm who arrested him in 1956. Thiếu Sơn quickly resumed journalism after his release in 1960, using a variety of pseudonyms, with his familiar leftist and patriotic theme. Under constant threat of anti-communist Saigon authorities, Thiếu Sơn was known to always carry a full set of necessary living materials to prepare for the case of being arrested. In 1968, Thiếu Sơn and other Saigon intellectuals joined the Alliance of National Democratic and Peaceful Forces of Vietnam, a political group associated with the communist-led National Liberation Front of South Vietnam (NLF). He took part in the human rights and national culture movement, and was a member of Committee for Improvement of Imprisonment's Condition. After the death of North Vietnam president Hồ Chí Minh, in September 1969 Thiếu Sơn published an article which openly praised president Hồ as a great personality, praised Hồ's leadership during Vietnam's resistance war against France and the United States, and predicted U.S. inevitable failure in the Vietnam War. On 22 November 1970, Thiếu Sơn made a famous speech at Saigon Literature University about Vietnam's literature from before 1945 to the contemporary times.

Alarmed by Thiếu Sơn's activities, Saigon government arrested him again in 1972, accused him as an espionage agent. He was exiled to Côn Đảo, the infamous prison where many communists and political prisoners were jailed. Thiếu Sơn was released to the NLF in March 1974 according to the Paris Peace Accord, then was sent to Hanoi and France for recuperation. In France, Thiếu Sơn continued his activism and journalism, he met with oversea Vietnameses and encouraged them to support North Vietnam's resistance against the U.S. He also finished his memoir Nợ bút nghiên hay nghĩa đồng bào (Debt of penmanship or duty with compatriots).

== After 1975 ==
Thiếu Sơn returned to the unified Vietnam after 30 April 1975. Despite old age and deteriorating health, he keep being active in journalism and social activities. He worked in Vietnam Fatherland Front at Ho Chi Minh City and wrote for many well-known newspapers in the unified Vietnam.

Thiếu Sơn died on 5 January 1978 after a stroke at the age of 70.

== Notable works ==
- Phê bình và cảo luận ("Criticism and rough dissertation", literary reviews collection, 1933)
- Câu chuyện văn học ("The story of literature", literary reviews collection, 1943)
- Đời sống tinh thần ("The Spiritual Life", social review, 1945)
- Người bạn gái ("The Girfiend", novel, 1941)
- Giữa hai cuộc cách mạng ("Between the two revolutions", journal articles collection, 1947)
- Nghệ thuật và nhân sinh ("Arts and human", selected works, 2000)
- Nợ bút nghiên hay nghĩa đồng bào ("Debt of penmanship or duty with compatriots", memoirs)
