= Giồng Trôm district =

Coordinates: 10.167°N 106.467°E

Giồng Trôm district Huyện Giồng Trôm
- District
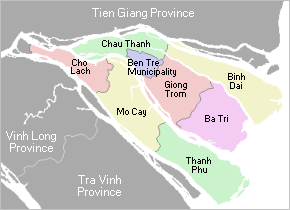
- Location in Bến Tre province
- Country: Vietnam
- Province: Bến Tre
- Capital: Giồng Trôm

Area
  - District: 120 sq mi (311 km^{2})

Population (2019 census)
  - District: 169,987
  - Density: 1,420/sq mi (547/km^{2})
  - Urban: 9,611
  - Rural: 160,376
- Time zone: UTC+07:00 (Indochina Time)

Giồng Trôm is a rural district of Bến Tre province in the Mekong Delta region of Vietnam. As of 2019 the district had a population of 169,987. The district covers an area of 311 km^{2}. The district capital lies at Giồng Trôm. This district is the home country of Phan Văn Trị. The commune Mỹ Thạnh has the famous speciality: Mỹ Lồng rice paper.

The district includes one township, Giồng Trôm (capital), and the following communes: Bình Hòa, Bình Thành, Châu Bình, Châu Hòa, Hưng Lễ, Hưng Nhượng, Hưng Phong, Long Mỹ, Lương Hòa, Lương Phú, Lương Quới, Mỹ Thạnh, Phong Nẫm, Phước Long, Sơn Phú, Tân Hào, Tân Lợi Thạnh, Tân Thanh, Thạnh Phú Đông and Thuận Điền.
