= Petelotiella =

Scientific classification
- Kingdom: Plantae
- Clade: Tracheophytes
- Clade: Angiosperms
- Clade: Eudicots
- Clade: Rosids
- Order: Rosales
- Family: Urticaceae
- Tribe: Elatostemateae
- Genus: Petelotiella; Gagnep.
- Species: P. tonkinensis

Binomial name
- Petelotiella tonkinensis (Gagnep.) Gagnep.

Synonyms
- Petelotia tonkinensis Gagnep.

Species of flowering plant

Petelotiella is a monotypic genus of flowering plants belonging to the family Urticaceae. It contains just one species, Petelotiella tonkinensis.

It is native to Vietnam.

The genus name of Petelotiella is in honour of Paul Alfred Pételot (1885–1965), a French botanist and entomologist, whose primary scholarly focus was on medicinal plants in Southeast Asia. The genus has the former name of Petelotia Gagnep.

The Latin specific epithet of tonkinensis means "of Tonkin (a French protectorate encompassing modern Northern Vietnam, 1883–1945 and 1945–1948).

Both the genus and the species were first described and published in H.Lecomte (ed.), Fl. Indo-Chine Vol.5 on page 873 in 1929.
