= Tonkin (French protectorate) =

1883–1949 French protectorate in southeast Asia

Coordinates: 21.0000°N 106.0000°E

Protectorate of Tonkin Protectorat du Tonkin (French) Xứ bảo hộ Bắc Kỳ (Vietnamese) 處保護北圻 (Chữ Hán)
- 1883–1945; 1946–1949
- Protectorate flag Seal of the Resident-Superior
- Motto: Liberté, égalité, fraternité "Liberty, Equality, Fraternity"
- Anthem: "La Marseillaise" Royal anthem: Đăng đàn cung (English: "The Emperor Mounts His Throne")
- Great Seal of the Viceroy of Tonkin; Khâm sai đại thần quan phòng 欽差大臣關防 (Until 1897)

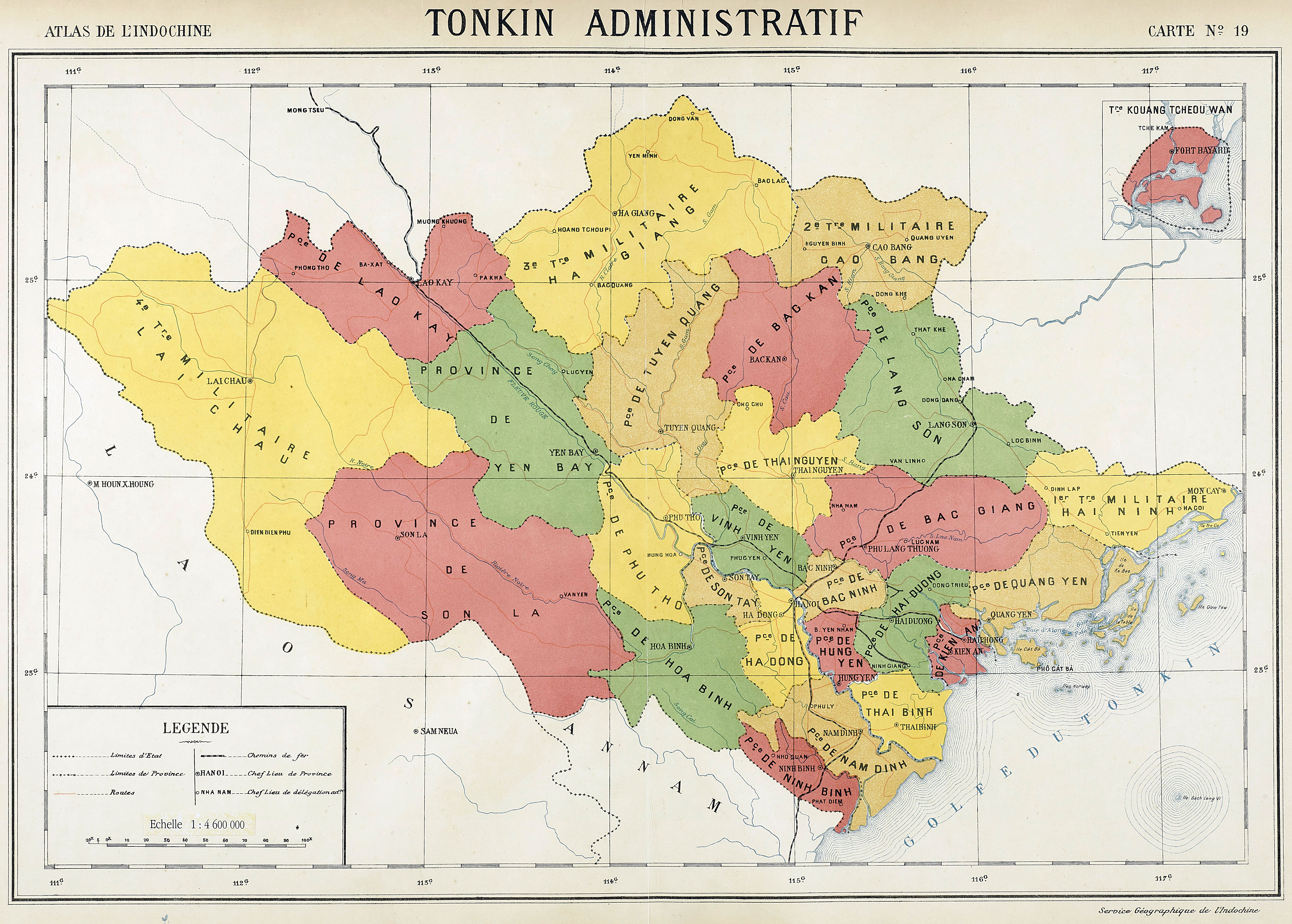
- Administrative divisions of Tonkin 1920
- Status: Protectorate of France (1883–1945); Constituent territory of French Indochina (1887–1949)
- Capital: Hanoi
- Common languages: French, Vietnamese, Central Tai languages, Southwestern Tai languages, Hmongic languages, Mienic languages
- Religion: Mahayana Buddhism; Confucianism; Taoism; Catholicism; Folk religion
- Demonym: Tonkinese
- Government: Absolute monarchy: under indirect rule (until 1897); under direct rule (from 1897)
- Resident-Superior
  - 1886: Paulin François Alexandre Vial
  - 1947–1948: Yves Jean Digo
- Kinh lược sứ (Viceroy of Tonkin)
  - 1883–1885: Nguyễn Hữu Độ (first)
  - 1890–1897: Hoàng Cao Khải (last)
- Legislature: None (rule by decree); House of Representatives (de jure advisory body)
- Historical era: New Imperialism
  - Harmand Treaty: 25 August 1883
  - Patenôtre Treaty: 6 June 1884
  - Japanese occupation: September 1940
  - Abdication of Bảo Đại: 25 August 1945
  - Creation of the Provisional Central Government of Vietnam: 1948
  - Élysée Accords took effect on June 14; ratification by France in 1950, formally recognising the end of the protectorate over Vietnam: 1949

Population
  - 1885: 7,487,000
  - 1939: 11,509,000
- Currency: Vietnamese cash, French Indochinese piastre
Preceded by
1883: Empire of Đại Nam
1889: Sip Song Chau Tai
1898: Zhanjiang
1945: Empire of Vietnam
Succeeded by
1945: Empire of Vietnam
Zhanjiang
1948: Provisional Central Government of Vietnam
1949: Democratic Republic of Vietnam
State of Vietnam
- Today part of: Vietnam; China ∟Zhanjiang

Tonkin (chữ Hán: 東京), or Bắc Kỳ (北圻), was a French protectorate encompassing modern Northern Vietnam from 1883 to 1949. Like the French protectorate of Annam, Tonkin was still nominally ruled by the Vietnamese Nguyễn dynasty. In 1886, the French separated Tonkin from the Nguyễn imperial court in Huế by establishing the office of "Viceroy" (經略衙, Kinh lược nha). However, on 26 July 1897, the position of Viceroy was abolished, officially making the French resident-superior of Tonkin both the representative of the French colonial administration and the Nguyễn dynasty court in Huế, giving him the power to appoint local mandarins. In 1887, Tonkin became a part of the Union of Indochina.

In March 1945, the emperor Bảo Đại rescinded the Patenôtre Treaty, ending the French protectorates over Annam and Tonkin, establishing the Empire of Vietnam, a Japanese-backed state. Following the surrender of Japan, ending World War II, the Việt Minh launched the August Revolution which led to the abdication of Bảo Đại and the declaration of independence of the Democratic Republic of Vietnam.

Tonkin was briefly occupied by the Chinese National Army before the French took over following the Ho–Sainteny Agreement in March 1946. After eliminating virtually all nationalist oppositions, the communist-led Việt Minh clashed with the French over control of the territory. On 27 May 1948, Tonkin and Annam were partly merged under the Provisional Central Government of Vietnam. The French legally maintained the protectorate until they formally signed over sovereignty to Bảo Đại and the State of Vietnam in 1950 after the Élysée Accords took effect on 14 June 1949.

== History ==
=== Establishment ===
After defeating the Vietnamese Nguyễn dynasty, the French colonised Southern Vietnam including Saigon in 1862 and 1867. Their sovereignty over here was recognized by the Vietnamese in 1874. Central and Northern Vietnam later became the French protectorates of Annam and Tonkin and French influence in the Indochina Peninsula strengthened. However unlike Cochinchina, these two territories were still parts of Vietnam legally. During the Sino-French War (1884–85), the northernmost part of Vietnam, Tonkin (then considered a crucial foothold in Southeast Asia and a key to the Chinese market), was invaded by the French. After the Treaty of Huế (1883) with Vietnam and the Treaty of Tientsin (1885) with the Chinese Qing dynasty, all of Vietnam was governed by the French.

During the French colonial administration, Vietnam was administratively divided into three different territories: Tonkin (in the north), Annam (in the centre), and the colony of Cochinchina (in the south). These territories were fairly arbitrary in their geographic extent as the vast majority of the Vietnamese regarded their country as a single land and minor resistance to French rule continued over the next 70 years to achieve an independent state. Annam and Tonkin were originally a single entity, the Résidence supérieure of Annam-Tonkin. On June 3, 1886, the Nguyễn emperor Đồng Khánh delegated all of his powers in Tonkin to a Kinh lược sứ (經略使, equivalent of Viceroy), who acted under French supervision. On May 9, 1889, the Résidence supérieure of Annam-Tonkin was abolished, with Annam and Tonkin being separated in two Résidences supérieures, each subordinated to the governor-general of French Indochina. On July 26, 1897, Governor-General Paul Doumer had Emperor Thành Thái abolish the post of Kinh lược sứ.The Nguyễn dynasty still nominally reigned over Tonkin; it was now de facto under direct French rule.

During French rule, Hanoi was made capital of Tonkin and, in 1901, of the whole French Indochina. Cities in Tonkin saw significant infrastructure and economic development under the French, such as the development of the port of Haiphong and construction of the Trans-Indochinois Railway linking Hanoi to Saigon. Under French economic plans, mines yielding gold, silver, and tin as well as the farming of rice, corn, and tea powered Tonkin's economy. The imports included rice, iron goods, flour, wine, opium and cotton goods. Industrialization later led to the opening of factories producing textiles and ceramics for export throughout the French Empire. French cultural influence on Tonkin was also significant as French became the primary language of education, government, trade and media and heavy Catholic missionary activity resulted in almost 10% of the population identifying as Catholic by the 1940s. Prominent buildings in Hanoi were also constructed during the period of French rule, such as the Hanoi Opera House and the Hanoi University of Technology.

=== World War II ===
French colonial administration lasted until March 9, 1945, during Japanese occupation (1941–1945). Although French administration was allowed during Japanese occupation as a puppet government, Japan briefly took full control of Vietnam in March 1945 under the Empire of Vietnam and Tonkin became the site of the Vietnamese Famine of 1945 during this period. At the end of the war, the north of Vietnam (including Tonkin) saw a sphere of influence by China while the south was briefly occupied by the British for French forces to regroup and regain control. Harry Truman at the Potsdam Conference, stated an intention to hand the region back to French rule, a sharp contrast to Franklin D. Roosevelt's strong opposition to colonialism and commitment to support the Viet Minh. However, after the Japanese withdrew from Vietnam, Ho Chi Minh proclaimed the establishment of the Democratic Republic of Vietnam in Ba Đình Square. Hanoi was later reoccupied by the French and conflict between the Viet Minh and France broke out into the First Indochina War.

=== End ===
As the French sought to establish a coherent government in Vietnam as an alternative to Ho Chi Minh, Tonkin was merged in 1948 into the Provisional Central Government of Vietnam, which was replaced the next year by the State of Vietnam, following the reunification with Cochinchina. After the French defeat at the Battle of Dien Bien Phu in Western Tonkin in 1954, the Communist state of North Vietnam was formed, consisting of Tonkin and northern Annam.

== Administration ==
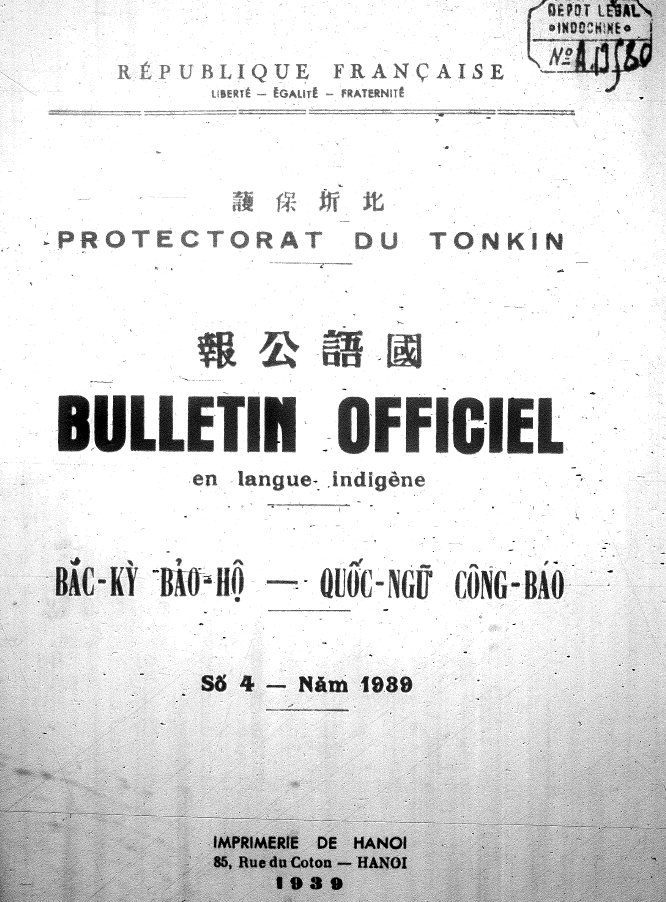
The 1939 Vietnamese language edition of Tonkin's official government bulletin shows the overlapping authority of the French colonial administration and the government of the Nguyễn dynasty, with French public laws and official decisions as well statements by the emperor Bảo Đại.

Tonkin was a component of French Indochina. It was a de facto French colony despite being a protectorate on paper. The British Naval Intelligence Division wrote during World War II that "at first the native political organization was maintained, but in 1897 the office of the viceroy, representing the king of Annam in Tonkin, was abolished, and since then other changes have further weakened the influence of the native government." Formally the four protectorates of French Indochina were ruled by their respective monarchs, but in fact the protectorates were all under the close control of the French senior residents. As the governor-general of French Indochina Pierre Pasquier stated: "The King reigns but the Resident superior rules." The effective power in the protectorate was in the hands of the resident-superior with both the monarch and the local high officials playing a subordinate role to his office.

Tonkin was administered by a French resident similar to those in Annam, Laos, and Cambodia, a conseil du protectorat composed of important officials and representatives from the chambers of agriculture and commerce, assisted the resident in performing his duties.

On 31 July 1898 the president of France, Félix Faure, issued a decree that established a central bank for the entirety of French Indochina and that this bank would set the federal French Indochinese budget, on the same day the French president issued a decree that established a budget for the government of Tonkin. Furthermore, the French president also decreed that the budget of Tonkin would be financed through direct tax revenue collected in the territory as opposed to only indirect taxes. This decree also meant that the treasury of the Nguyễn dynasty was abolished and all finances to be directly managed by the French. The resident-superior was assisted by various agencies such as the Tokin Protectorate Council, the Tokin Chamber of Commerce, the Tonkin Chamber of Agriculture, and the House of People's Representatives. Despite its name the House of People's Representatives was not democratically elected but was composed of appointed Vietnamese elites and it only discussed issues related to taxation rather than legislation.

Tonkin was made up of 23 provinces, subdivided into phu or huyen, cantons, and communes. Local administration was in the hands of Vietnamese mandarins, although they were appointed by the resident rather than the emperor as in Annam. The smallest unit of administration, the commune, was overseen by two councils: the toc bieu, and the mandarin-dominated ky muc with the authority to veto decisions of the toc bieu. Hanoi and Haiphong had municipal councils appointed by the governor-general of Indochina. Each province was headed by "Công sứ" (公使), a French resident-minister, who was also assisted by a number of different agencies such as the Resident-Minister's Office, the Provincial Council, etc.

== Gallery ==
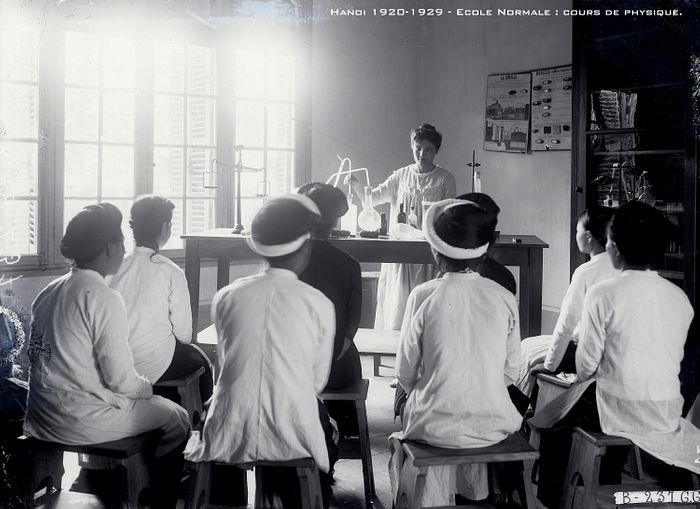
Girls study chemistry in colonial school (Ecole Normale d'Institutrices)

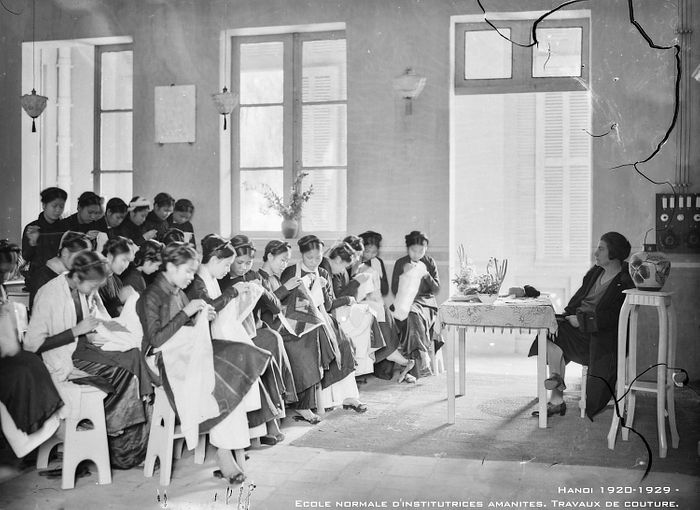
Girls study tailoring in colonial school (Ecole Normale d'Institutrices)

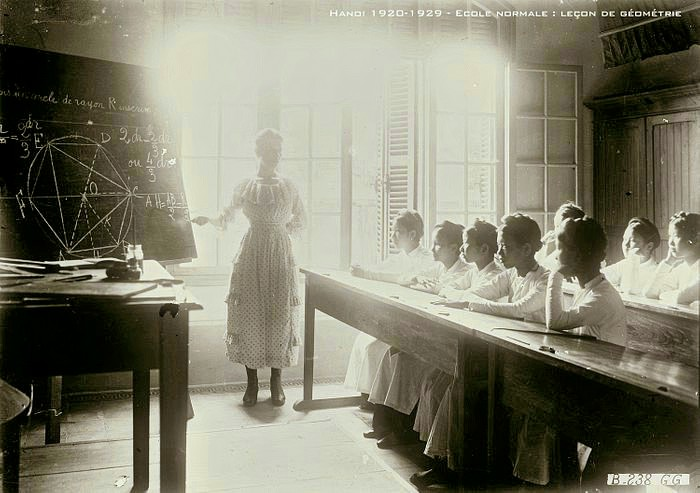
Girls study maths in colonial school (Ecole Normale d'Institutrices)

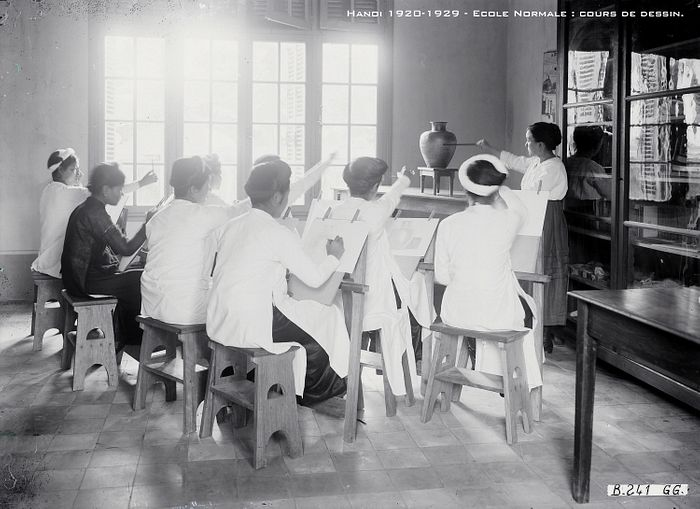
Girls study drawing in colonial school (Ecole Normale d'Institutrices)

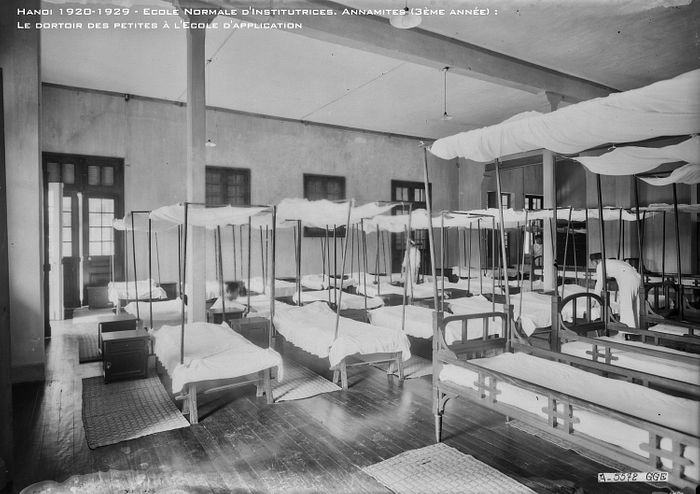
Bedrooms at school

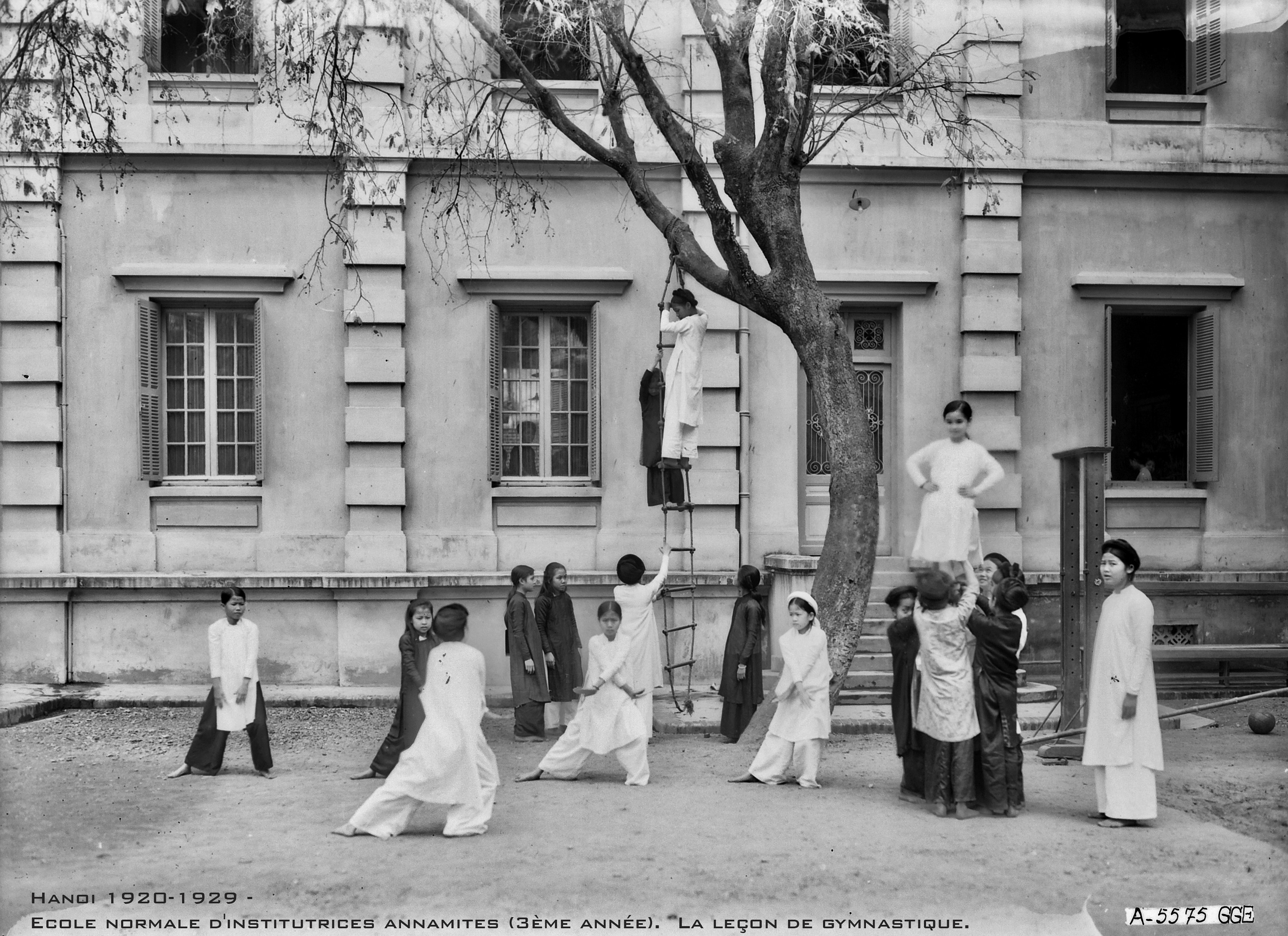
Play time

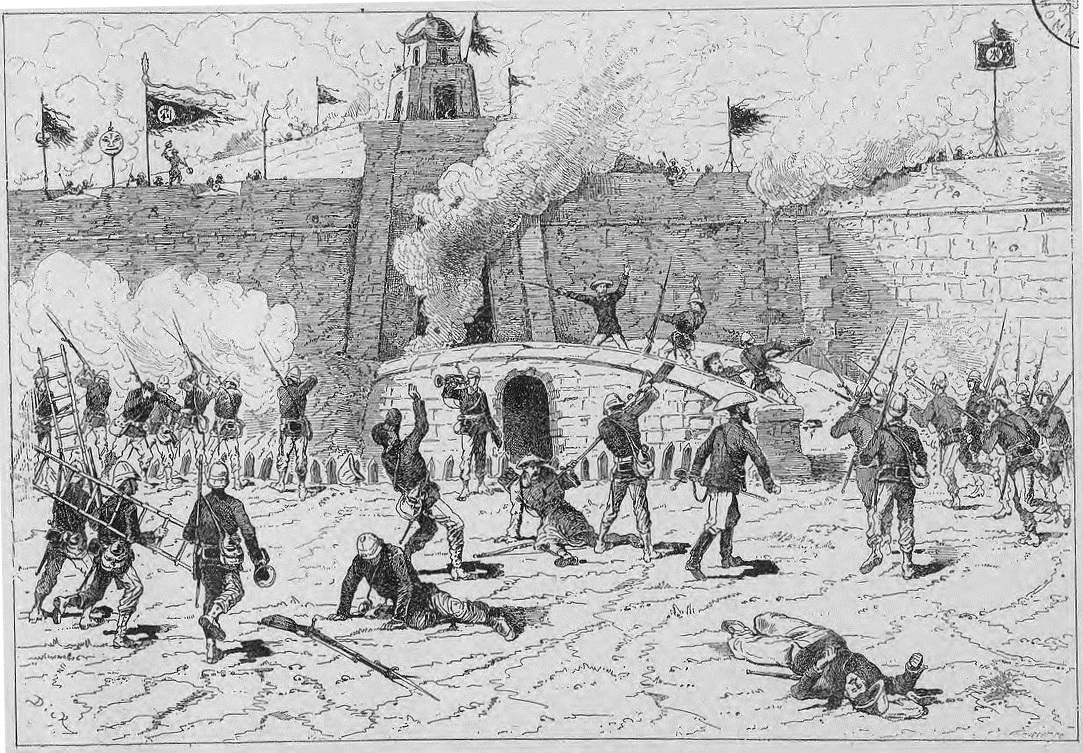
Capture of Nam Định, 1883

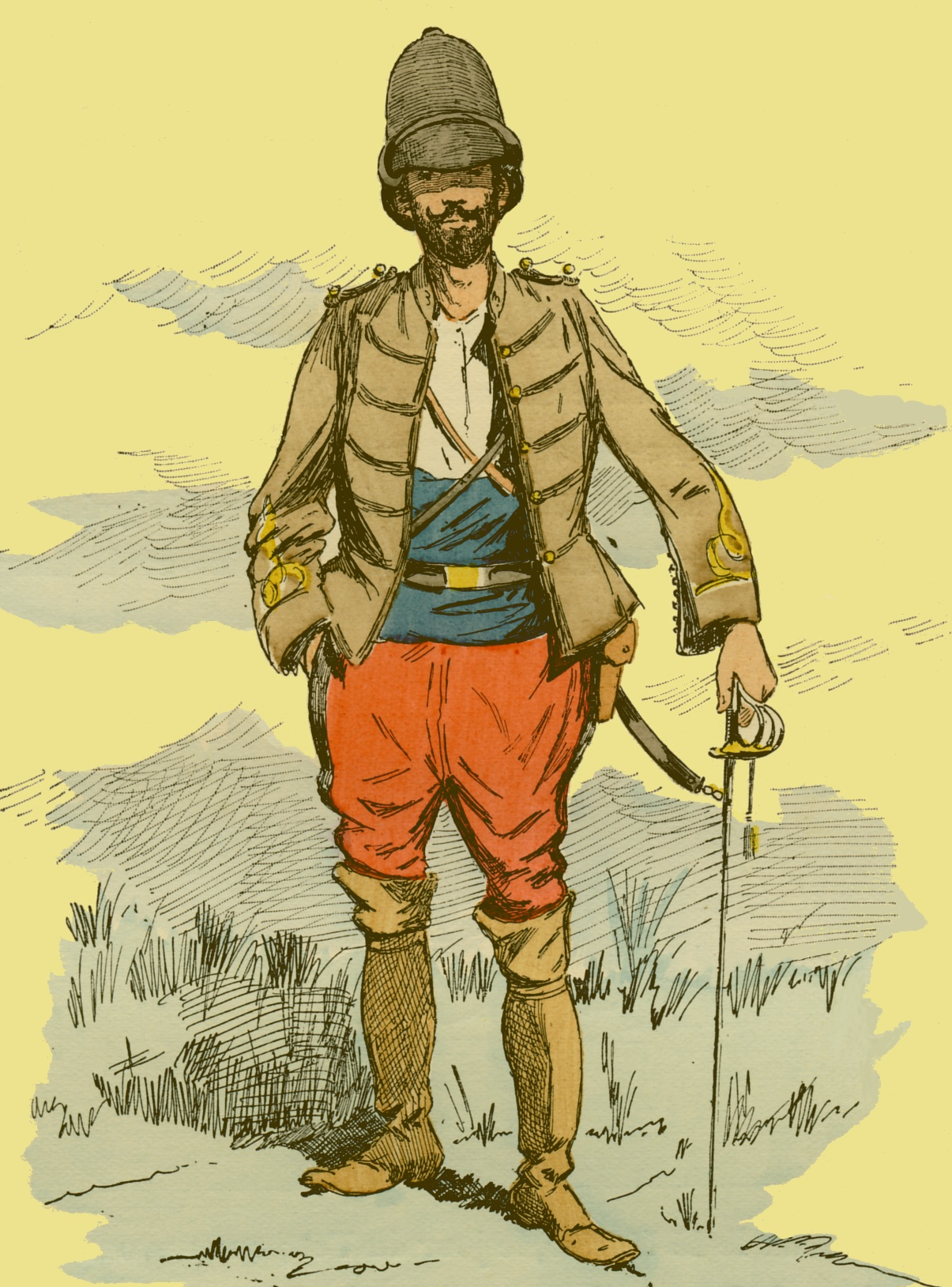
French zouave officer in Tonkin, spring 1885

Hanoi around 1910

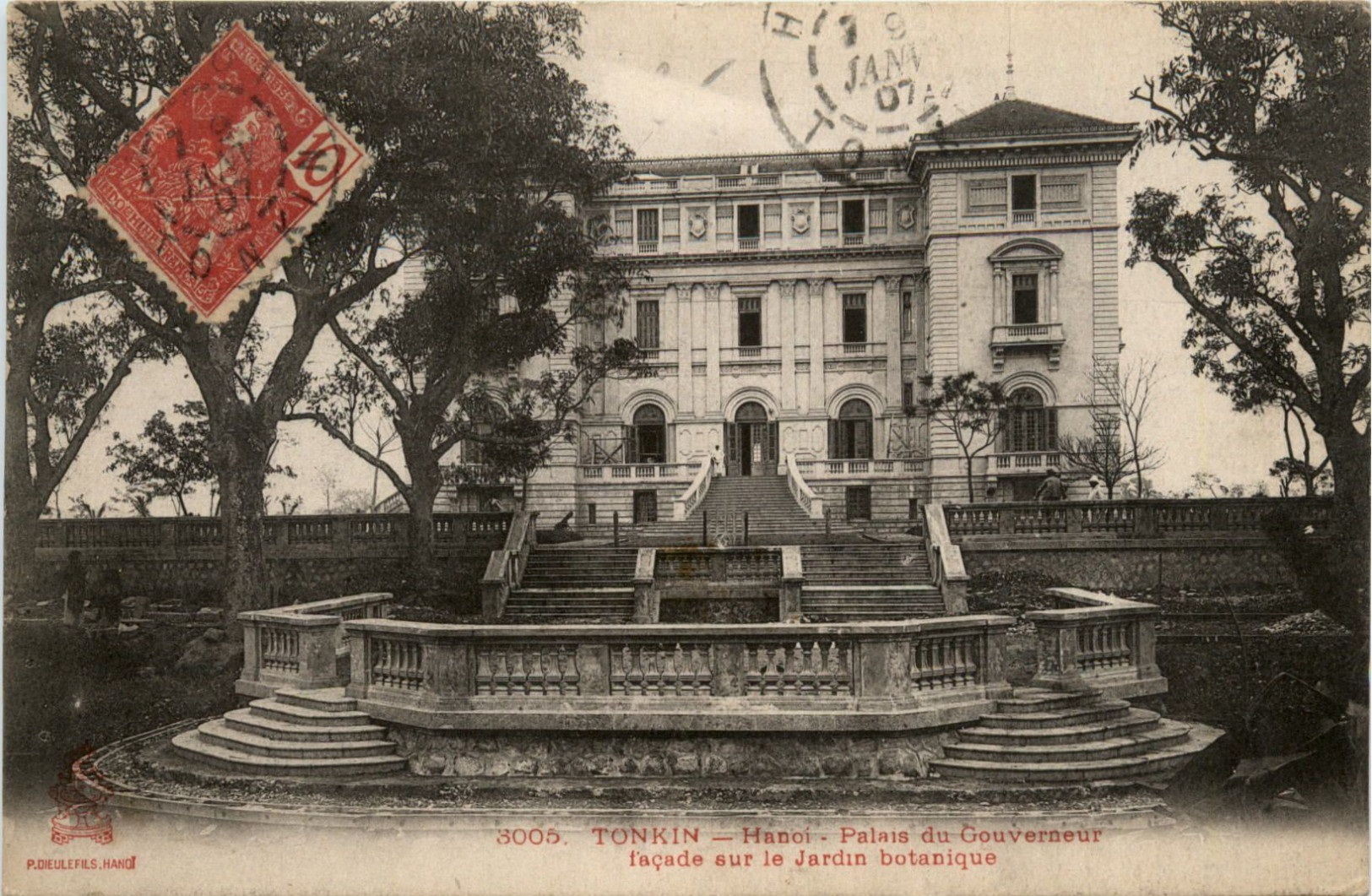
The French Governor-General's Palace in Hanoi

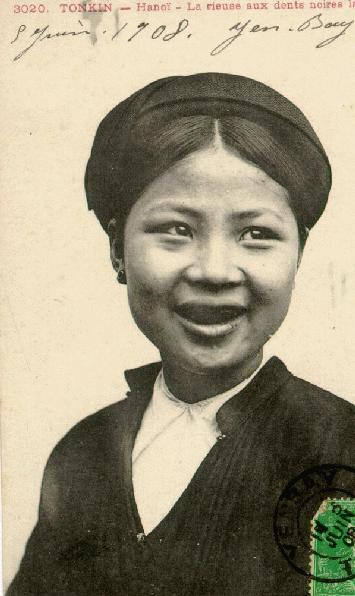
Tonkin woman with black-painted teeth, ca. 1908

=== Maps ===
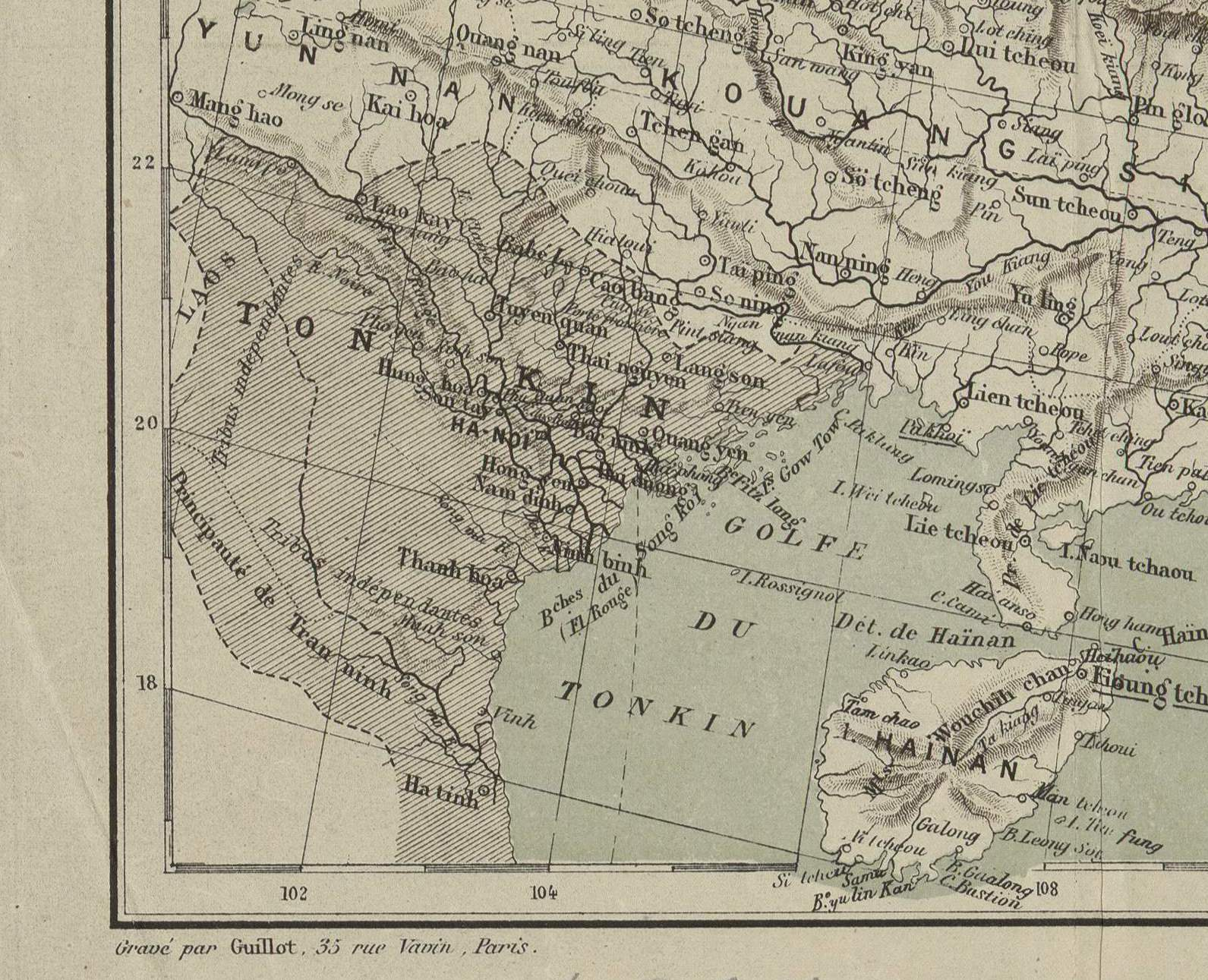
Tonkin, 1880s

Tonkin, 1883

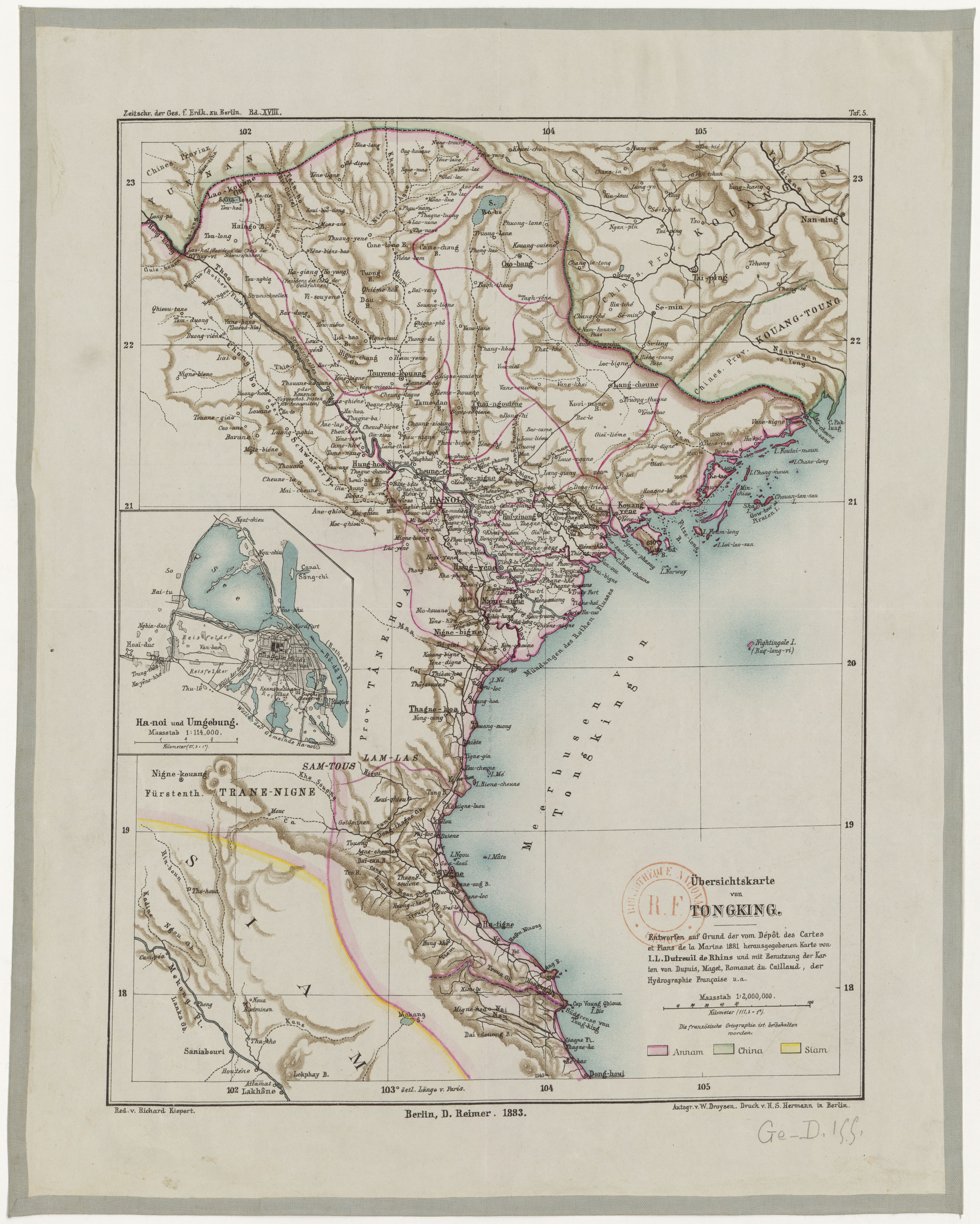
Tonkin, 1883

Tonkin, 1889

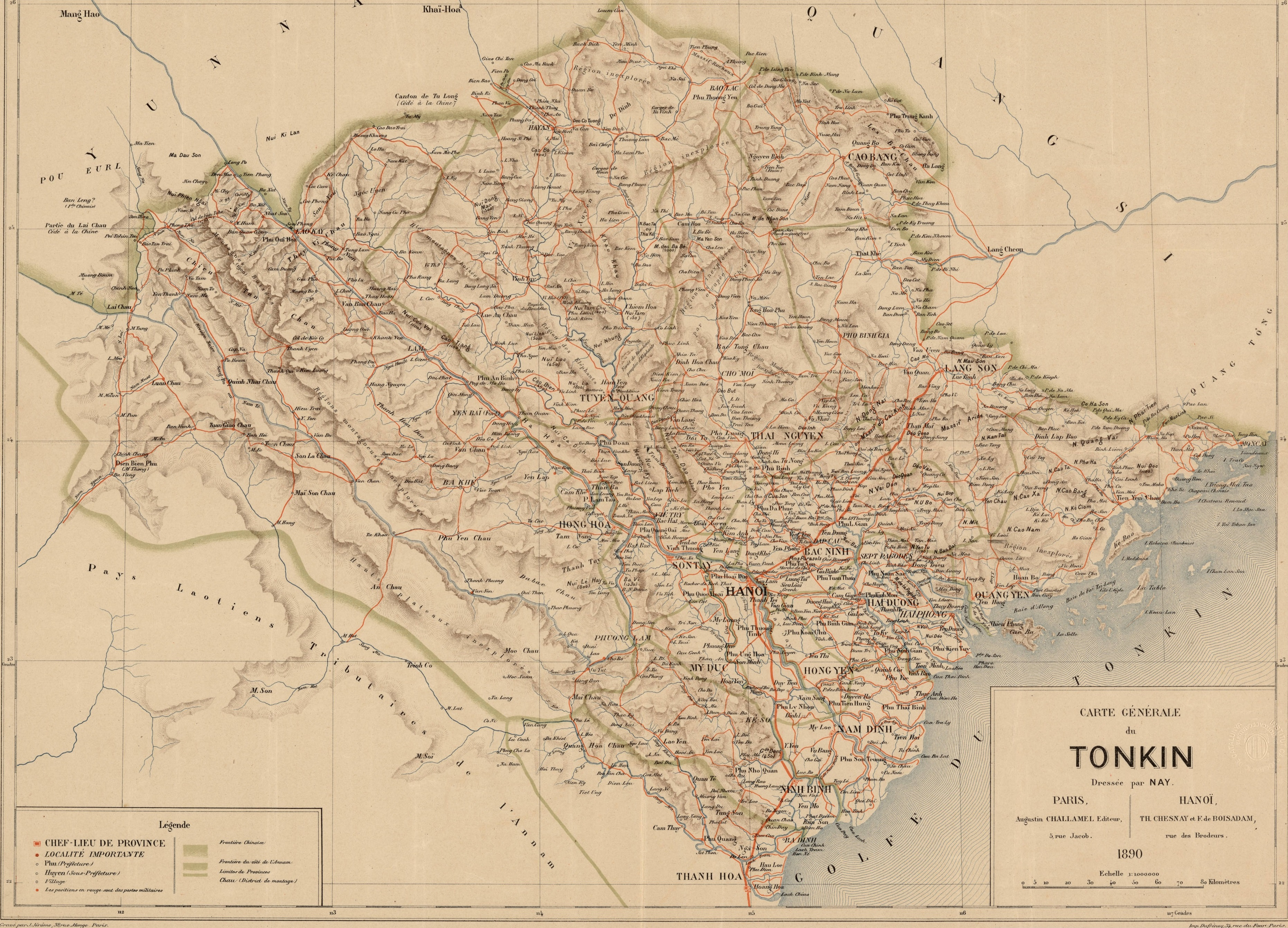
Tonkin, 1890

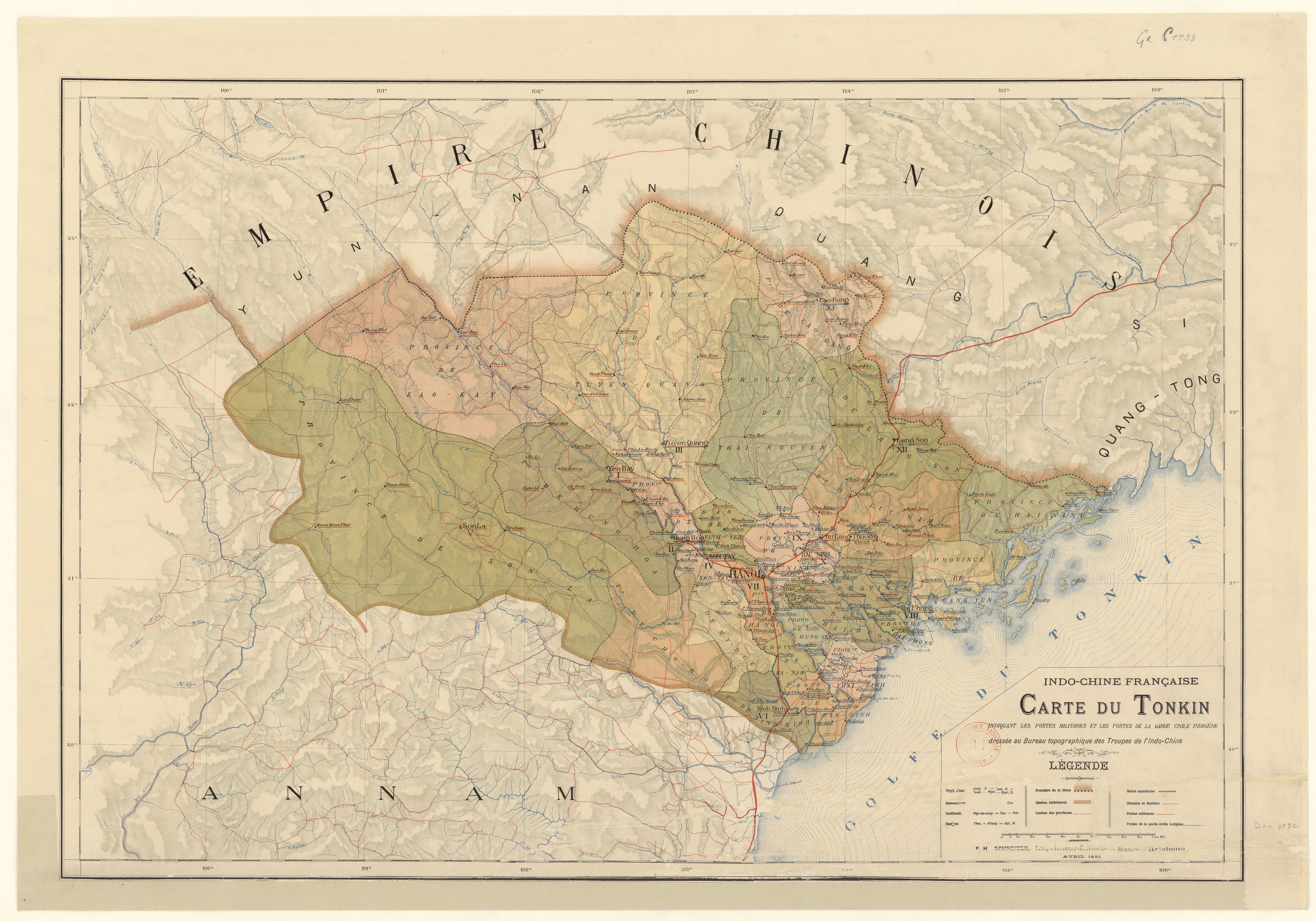
Tonkin, 1891

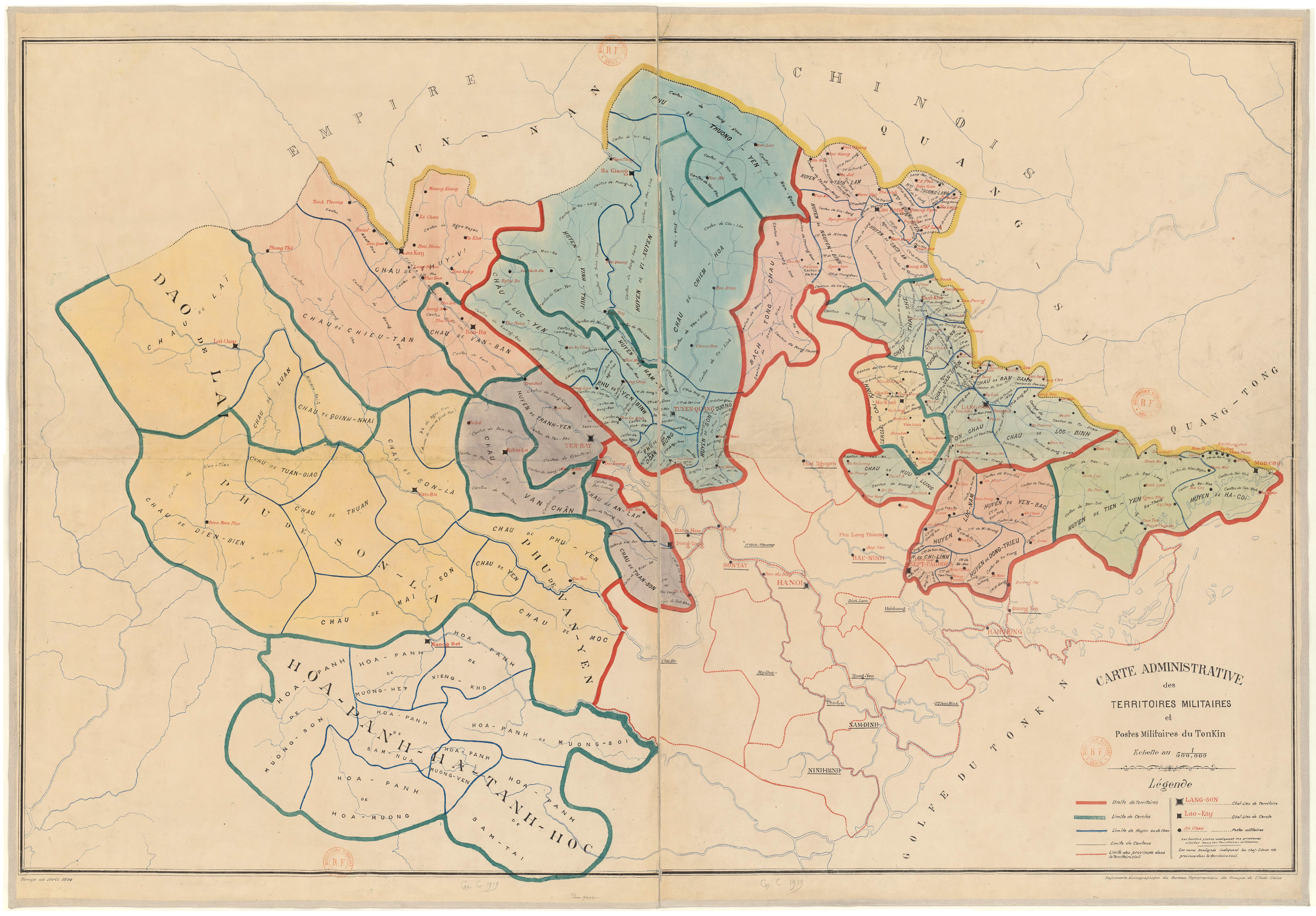
Tonkin, 1894

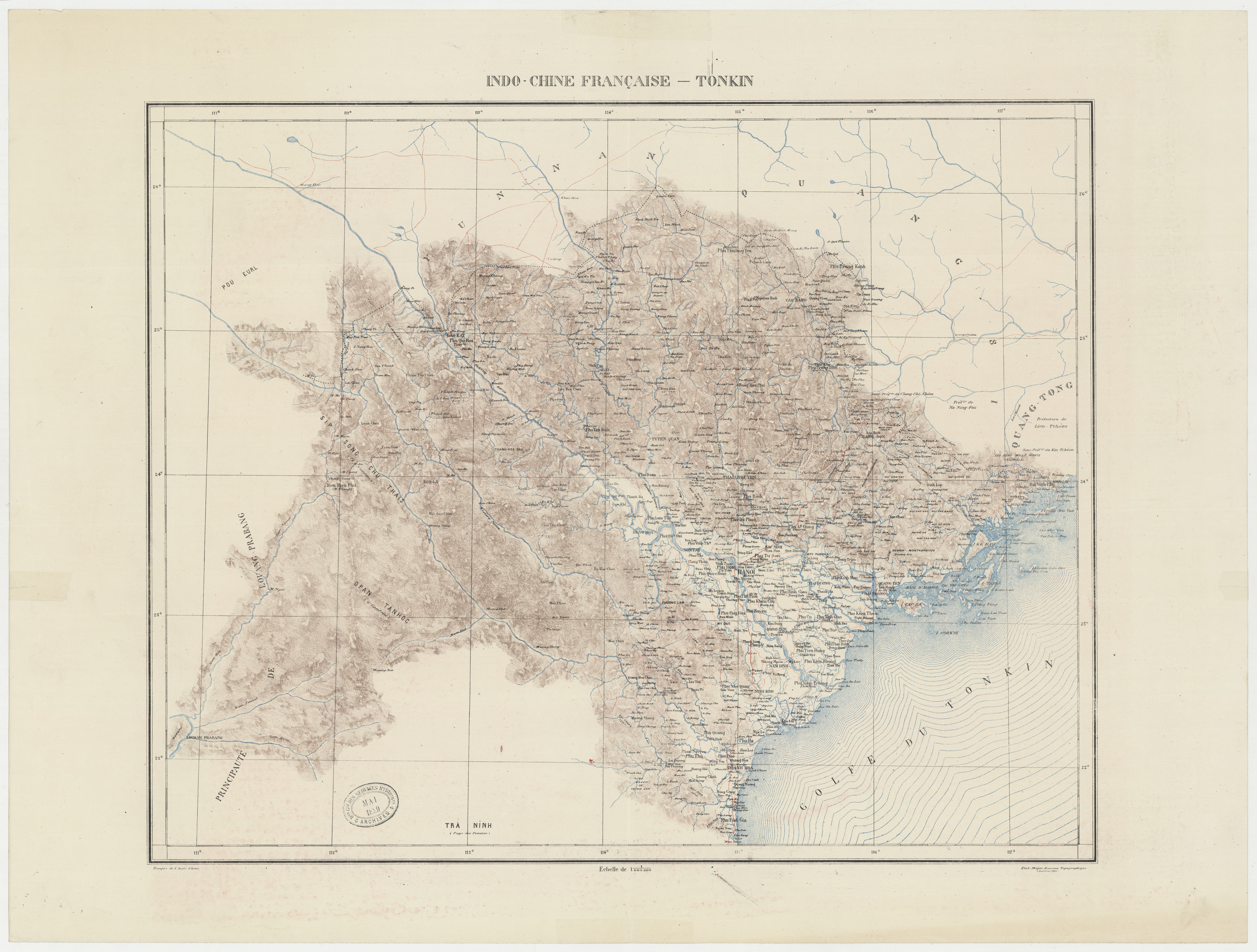
Tonkin, 1889–1895

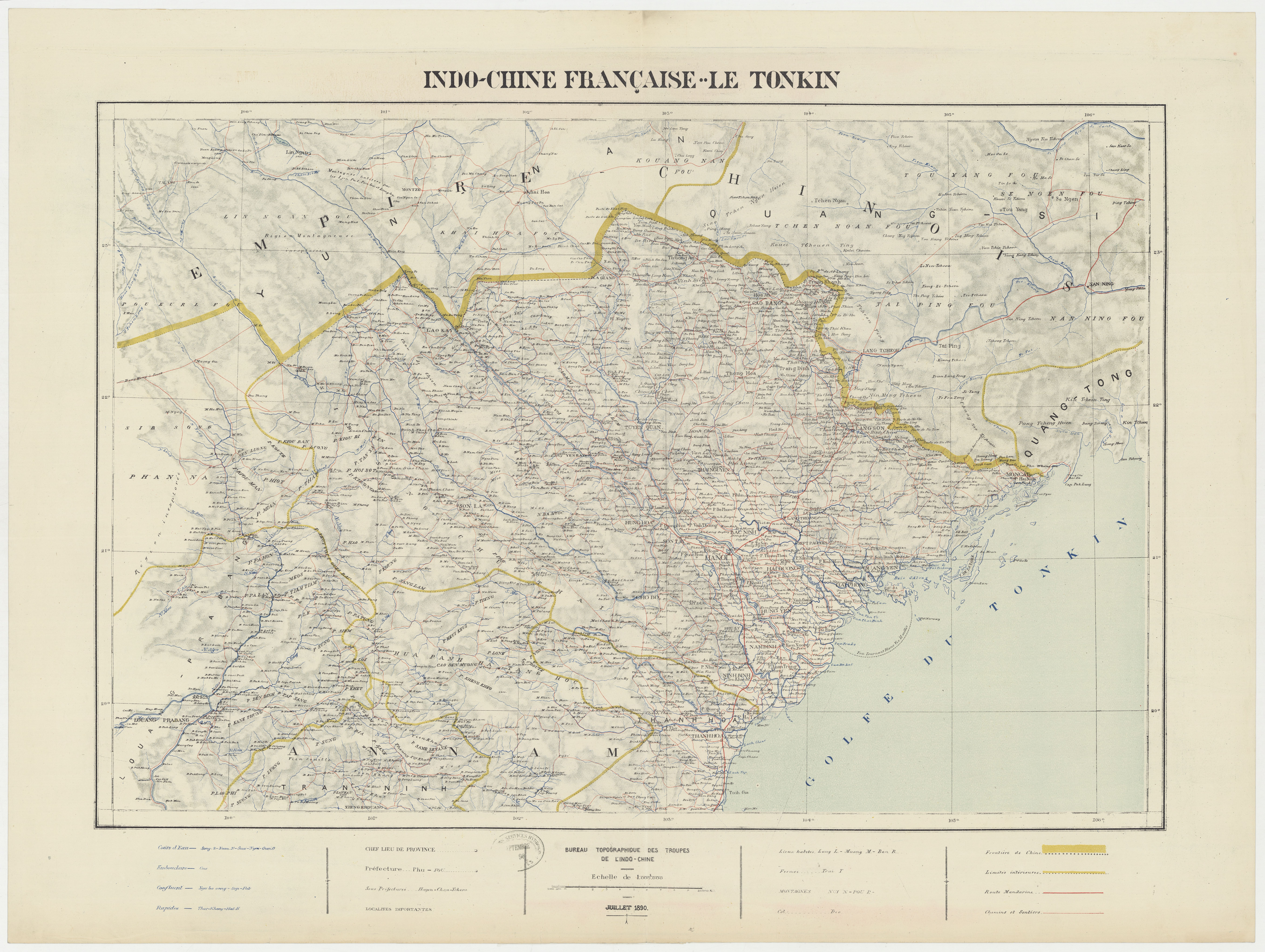
Tonkin, 1889–1895

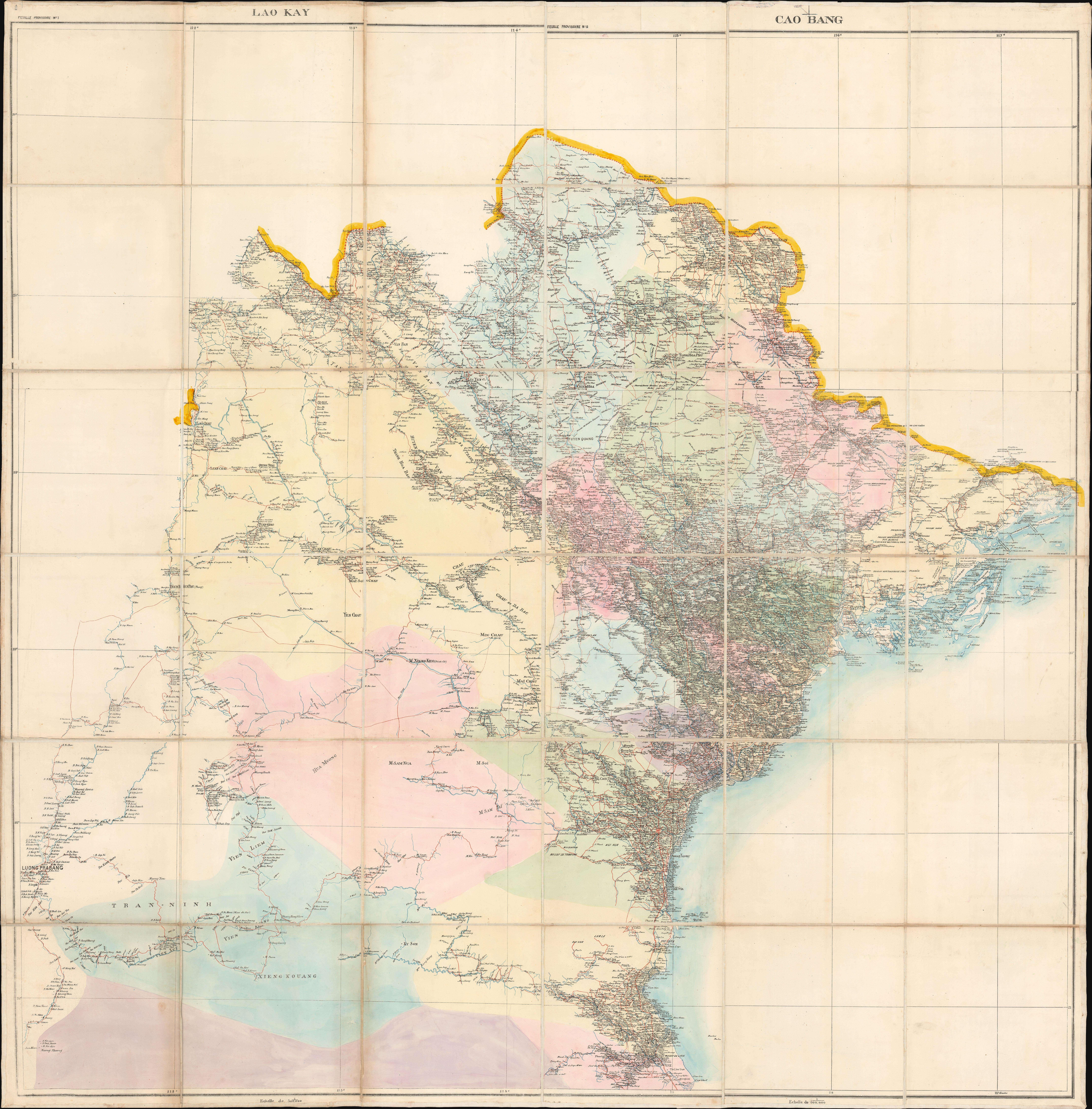
Tonkin, 1899

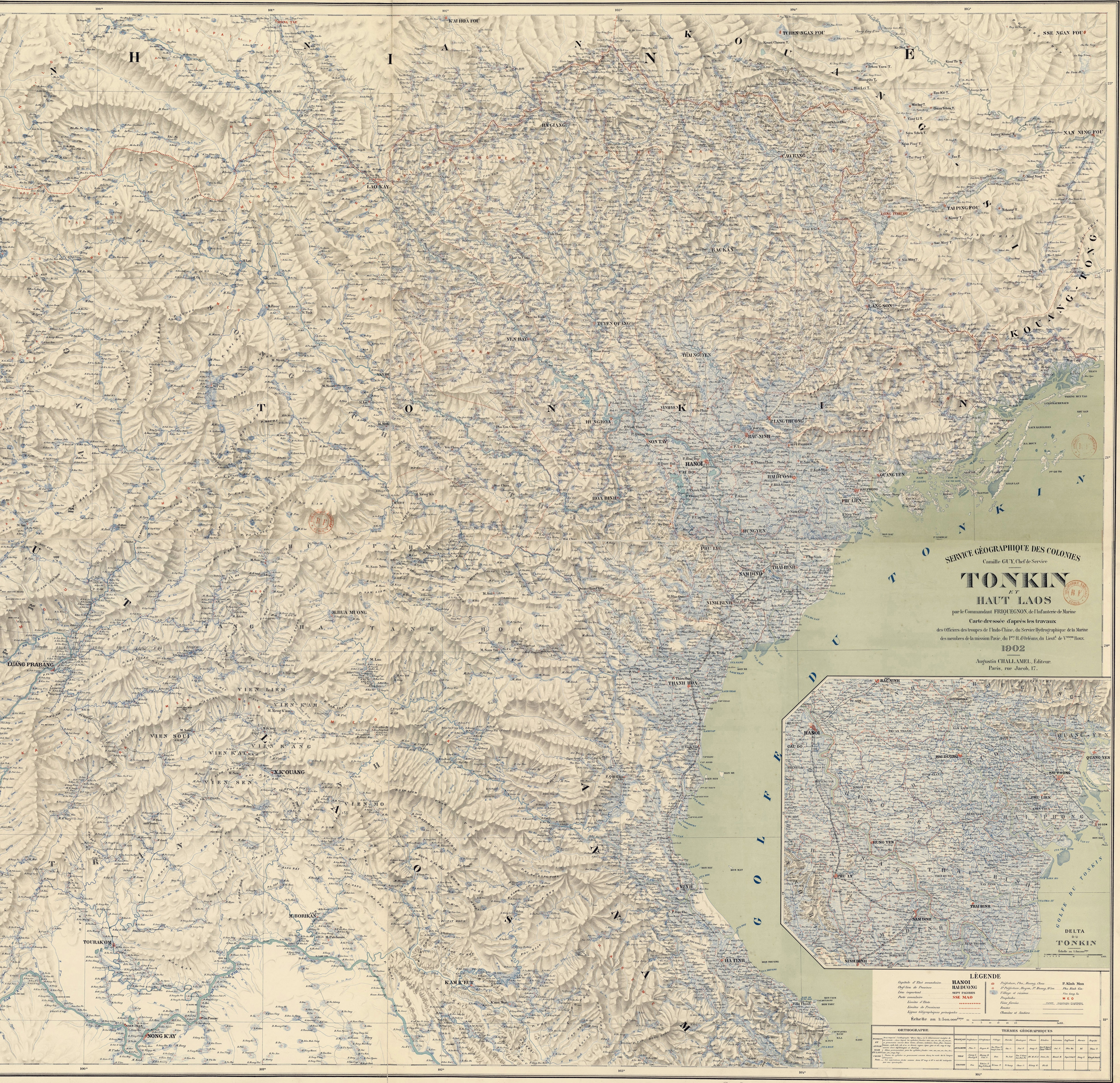
Tonkin, 1902

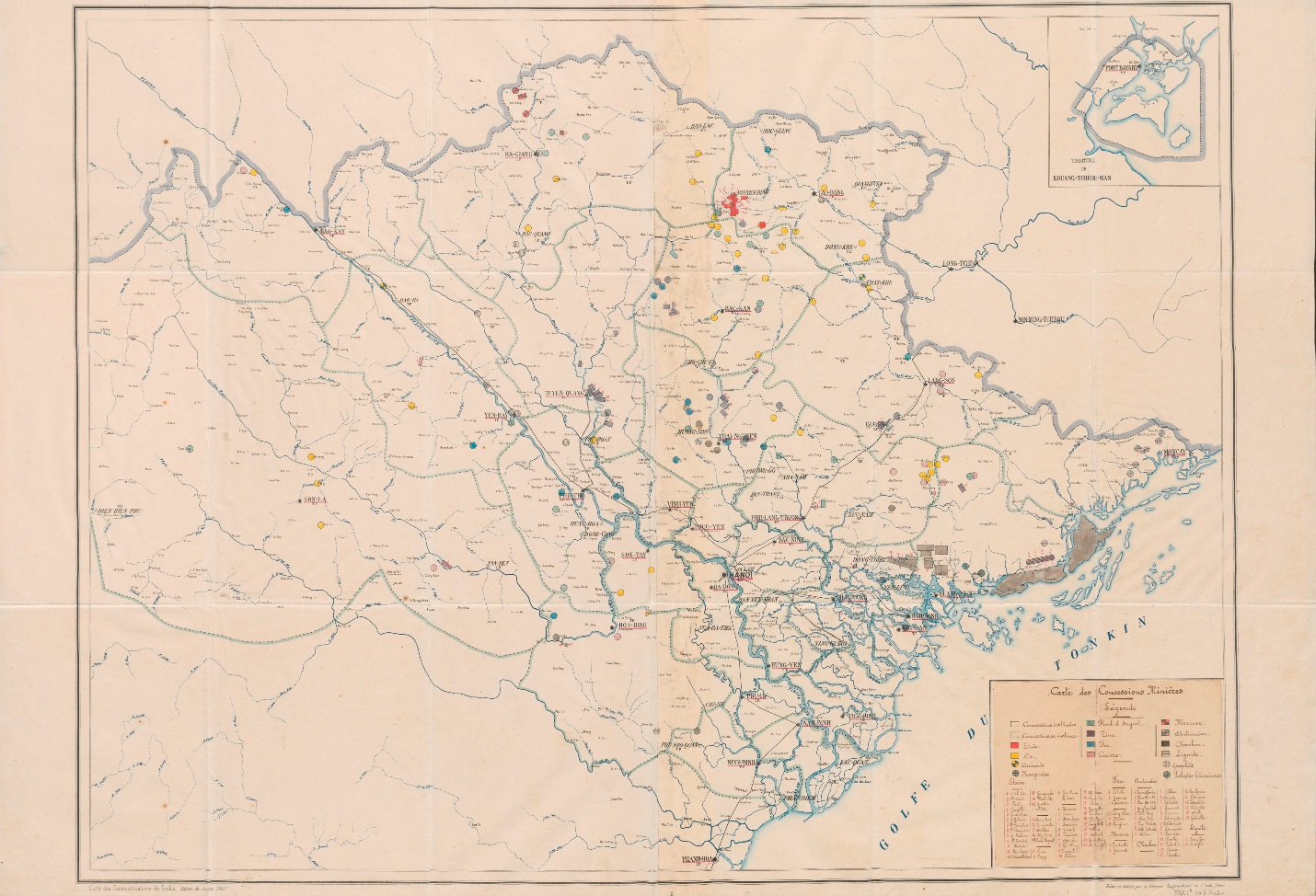
Tonkin, 1900–1909

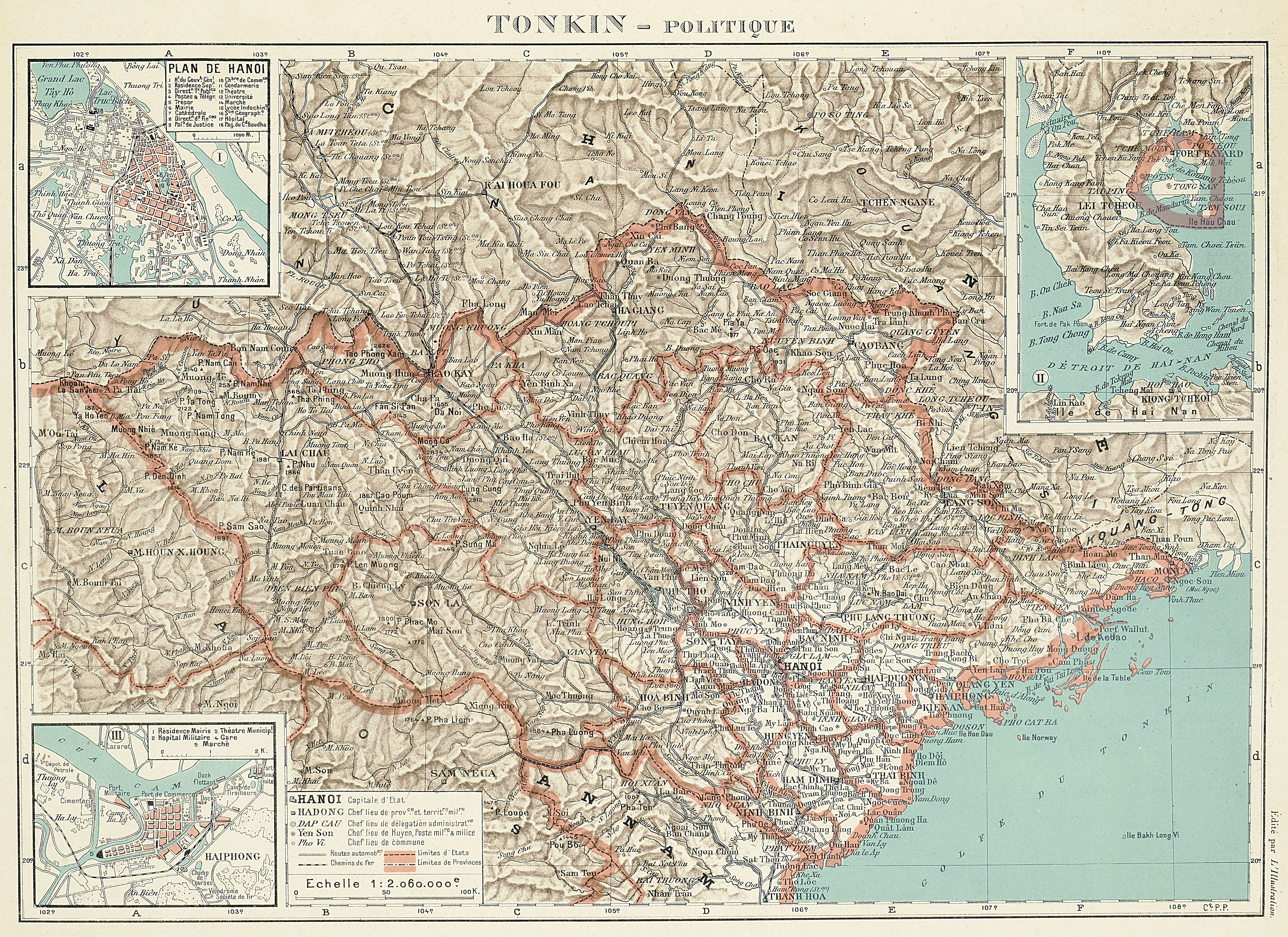
Administrative divisions of Tonkin, 1929

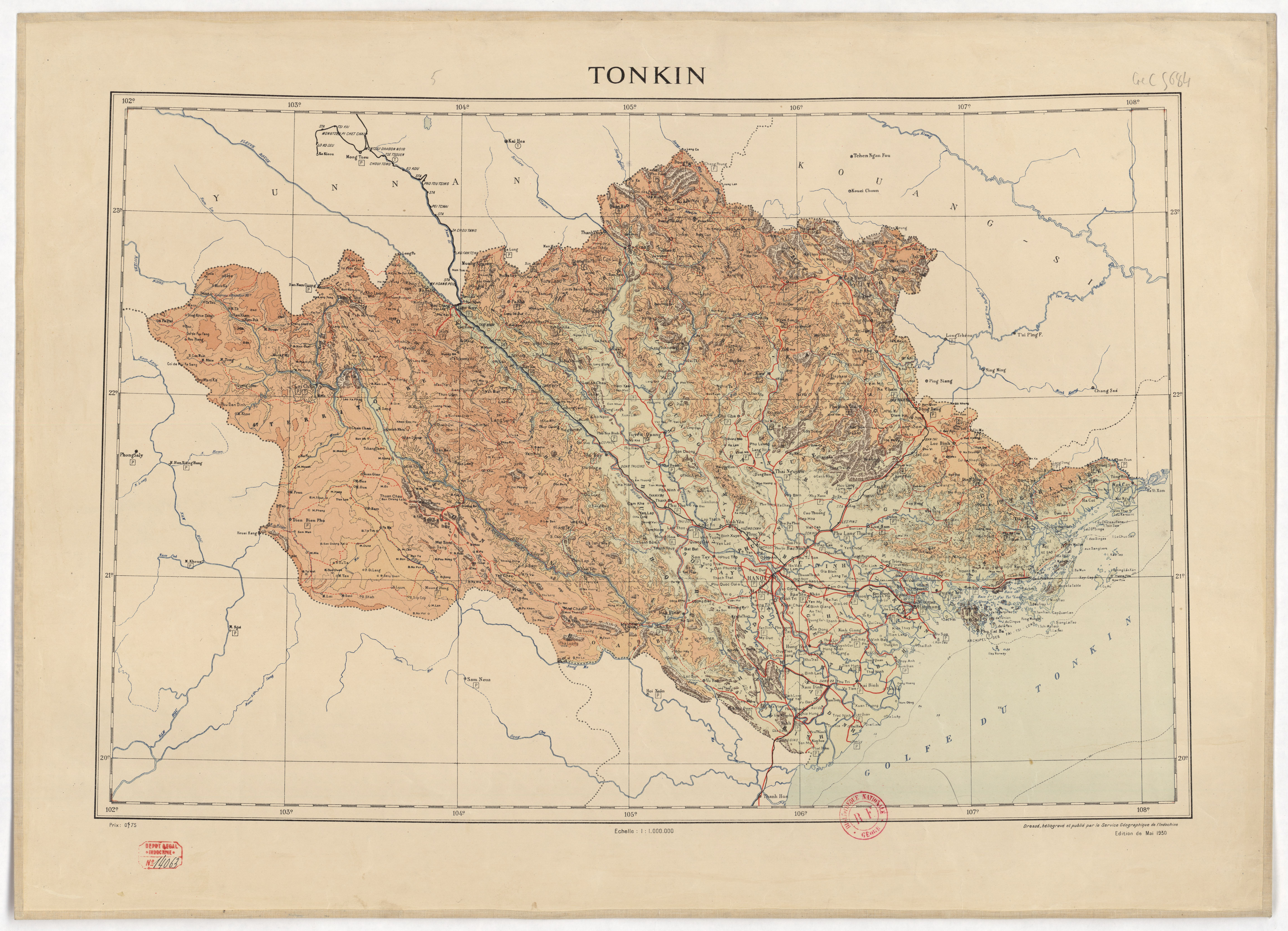
Tonkin, 1930

== See also ==
- Tonkin
- List of administrators of the French protectorate of Tonkin
- List of French possessions and colonies
- Petelotiella tonkinensis plant named after the place where it was found.
