= Mitrephora petelotii =

Scientific classification
- Kingdom: Plantae
- Clade: Tracheophytes
- Clade: Angiosperms
- Clade: Magnoliids
- Order: Magnoliales
- Family: Annonaceae
- Genus: Mitrephora
- Species: M. petelotii

Binomial name
- Mitrephora petelotii Weeras. & R.M.K.Saunders

Species of plant in the soursop family

Mitrephora petelotii is a species of plant in the family Annonaceae. It is native to Vietnam. Aruna Weerasooriya and Richard Saunders, the botanists who first formally described the species, named it in honor of the French botanist Paul Alfred Pételot, who collected the holotype specimen that they examined.

== Description ==
It is a tree reaching 8 meters (26 ft) in height. Its branches have lenticels. Its leathery, oval-shaped leaves are 6–12.5 by 2–4.5 centimeters (2.4–4.9 by 0.8–1.8 in) and come to a point at their tips. The leaves are smooth on their upper surfaces, while their undersides are slightly hairy. The leaves have 6–13 pairs of secondary veins emanating from their midribs. Its petioles are 3–7.5 by 1–1.7 millimeters. Its flowers are arranged in groups of 3 or fewer on a rachis opposite the leaves. Each flower is on a fleshy, slightly hairy pedicel that is 10.5–17.5 by 0.8–1.3 millimeters. The pedicels have an oval, basal bract that is 0.5 by 0.3 millimeters, and another middle bract that is oval and 1–1.9 by 1.1–1.9 millimeters. Its flowers have 3, green or brown, oval-shaped sepals that are 2–3 by 2–3 millimeters. The outside of the sepals are densely hairy, while their inner surfaces are smooth. Its 6 petals are arranged in two rows of 3. The oval-shaped outer petals are 9.5–17 by 7.5–16.5 millimeters and come to a point at their tip. Both surfaces of the outer petals are slightly hairy. The inner petals are 8.5–10.5 by 5.5–8.5 millimeters with a basal claw. The outside surface of the inner petals is slightly hairy while the tip of the inner surface has long hairs. It has numerous stamens that are 0.9–11 by 0.4–0.6 millimeters. The flowers have 8 free carpels that are 1.2–1.4 by 0.7–0.8 millimeters and covered in fine hairs. The carpels have 12–14 ovules arranged in two rows. Its stigma are shaped like narrow, inverted cones that are initially yellow, but turn purple. The fruit are attached to the pedicel by stipes that are 6–7 by 1.9–2.1 millimeters and covered in grey-brown hairs. The round, smooth fruit are 14.5–15.5 by 12–13.5 millimeters with a whitish waxy surface and covered in sparse, short hairs.

=== Reproductive biology ===
The pollen of M. petelotii is shed as permanent tetrads.
