= Giồng Trôm =

Giồng Trôm Xã Giồng Trôm
- Commune
- Location in Vietnam
- Coordinates: 10.17°N 106.511667°E
- Country: Vietnam
- Province: Vĩnh Long Province
- Establish: June 16, 2025

Area
  - Total: 42.39 km^{2} (16.37 sq mi)

Population 2025
  - Total: 37.599 people
  - Density: 0.8870/km^{2} (2.297/sq mi)
- Time zone: UTC+07:00

Giồng Trôm is a commune (xã) of Vĩnh Long Province, Vietnam.

== Geography ==
Giồng Trôm Commune is a commune situated in the northern part of Vĩnh Long Province, located approximately 80 km east of Long Châu Ward, 20 km southeast of An Hội, and 70 km north of Trà Vinh Ward. It formerly belonged to Giồng Trôm District in Bến Tre Province, and its geographical boundaries are as follows:

- To the east, it borders Mỹ Chánh Hòa Commune.
- To the west, it borders Phước Long, Tân Hào, and Lương Hòa Communes.
- To the south, it borders Hưng Nhượng and An Ngãi Trung Communes.
- To the north, it borders Châu Hòa Commune. According to Official Dispatch No. 2896/BNV-CQĐP dated May 27, 2025, issued by the Ministry of Home Affairs, following the administrative reorganization, Giồng Trôm Commune covers an area of 42.39 km² and has a population of 37,599 as of December 31, 2024, resulting in a population density of 0 people/km² (statistical data calculated as of December 31, 2024, in accordance with Article 6 of Resolution No. 76/2025/UBTVQH15, dated April 14, 2025, of the National Assembly Standing Committee).

== Administration divisions ==
Giồng Trôm Commune is divided into 19 hamlets: 1, 2, 3, 4, 5A, 5B, 6, Bình An, Bình Đông, Bình Lợi, Bình Phú, Bình Tiên, Bình Tiên 1, Bình Tiên 2, Đông Ngô, Hồ Sen, Kinh Ngoài, Kinh Trong, and Tây Kinh.

== History ==
On February 24, 1976, the Provisional Revolutionary Government of the Republic of South Vietnam issued a Decree regarding the dissolution of administrative zones and the consolidation of provinces in South Vietnam. Pursuant to this decree, Kiến Hòa Province was renamed Bến Tre Province.

At that time, Giồng Trôm Town and the communes of Bình Hòa and Bình Thành were situated within Giồng Trôm District, Bến Tre Province. Giồng Trôm Town served as the district seat of Giồng Trôm District, Bến Tre Province.

On June 12, 2025, the 15th National Assembly promulgated Resolution No. 202/2025/QH15 regarding the reorganization of provincial-level administrative units. Accordingly, the entire natural area and population of the provinces of Bến Tre, Vĩnh Long, and Trà Vinh were consolidated to form a new province named Vĩnh Long. On June 16, 2025, the National Assembly Standing Committee issued Resolution No. 1687/NQ-UBTVQH15 regarding the reorganization of commune-level administrative units in Vĩnh Long Province in 2025 (effective from June 16, 2025). Accordingly, the entire natural area and population of Giồng Trôm Town, along with the communes of Bình Hòa and Bình Thành—formerly belonging to Giồng Trôm District, Bến Tre Province—were consolidated into a new commune named **Giồng Trôm Commune** (Clause 89, Article 1).
