= Nam Quốc Cang =

Vietnamese journalist

Nam Quốc Cang (1917–1950), whose real name is Nguyễn Văn Sinh, was a Vietnamese journalist.

His hometown was Đức Phổ district, Quảng Ngãi province, then moved to Sài Gòn in 1940. After the August Revolution in 1945, he participated in writing articles for Tin Điển newspapers that was widely loved by readers. Under the pseudonym Nguyen Thach Son, in the article Sài gòn hoạt cảnh, he mocked the activities of Prime Minister Nguyen Van Thinh seriously. After that, he was editor-in-chief for Thời cuộc, Công chúng, Chống xâm lăngand finally Dân Quý newspaper.

On May 6, 1950, journalist Nam Quốc Cang and Đinh Xuân Tiếu were assassinated in front of the Dân Quý office at the corner of D'Arras-Frére Louis (now known as Cong Quynh - Nguyen Trai Street). He died when he was 33 years old. The death of two journalists has shocked the press and the public of Saigon. His funeral, held on May 9, attracted tens of thousands of Saigon residents.

Currently his pseudonym has been set for a street in District 1, Ho Chi Minh City.
