= Quercus petelotii =

Conservation status
- Endangered (IUCN 3.1)

Scientific classification
- Kingdom: Plantae
- Clade: Embryophytes
- Clade: Tracheophytes
- Clade: Spermatophytes
- Clade: Angiosperms
- Clade: Eudicots
- Clade: Rosids
- Order: Fagales
- Family: Fagaceae
- Genus: Quercus
- Subgenus: Quercus subg. Cerris
- Section: Quercus sect. Cyclobalanopsis
- Species: Q. petelotii

Binomial name
- Quercus petelotii A.Camus

Species of oak tree

Quercus petelotii is the accepted name of an endemic oak tree species in the beech family Fagaceae; there are no known sub-species. It is placed in subgenus Cerris, section Cyclobalanopsis.

The species appears to be endemic to Vietnam, where it may be called sồi Petelot. The tree grows up to 20 m and has 20 mm acorns, produced from velvety cupules.
