= List of administrators of the French protectorate of Tonkin =

Resident-Superior of Tonkin
- Résident supérieur du Tonkin (French); Thống sứ Bắc Kỳ (Vietnamese) 統使北圻 (chữ Hán)
- The seal of the Resident-Superior of the French protectorate of Tonkin.

- Reports to: Governor-General of French Indochina
- Residence: Residential palace of the Tonkin Governor (from 1919)
- Seat: Hanoi
- Precursor: Resident-General of Annam and Tonkin
- Formation: 8 April 1886
- First holder: Paulin François Alexandre Vial
- Final holder: François Jean Antonin Marie Amédée Gonzales de Linarès (as commissioner)

The position of Resident-Superior of Tonkin (French: Résident supérieur du Tonkin; Vietnamese: Thống sứ Bắc Kỳ; chữ Hán: 統使北圻) was established on 8 April 1886 as a successor to the Resident-General of Annam and Tonkin (résident général de l'Annam et du Tonkin) when it was decided to have one French resident for the French protectorate of Tonkin and a separate one for Annam.

== List ==
List of administrators of the French protectorate of Tonkin

(Dates in italics indicate de facto continuation of office)

Tenure	Incumbent	Notes
French Suzerainty
8 April 1886 to November 1886	Paulin François Alexandre Vial, Resident-Superior	In Hanoi; the city became permanent administrative seat
20 November 1886 to 29 January 1887	Jean Thomas Raoul Bonnal, Resident-Superior	1st time
1887 to 1888	Antony Wladislas Klobukowski, Acting Resident-Superior	
29 April 1888 to 10 May 1889	Eusèbe Irénée Parreau, Resident-Superior	
29 May 1889 to 6 April 1890	Ernest Albert Brière, Resident-Superior	1st time
7 April 1890 to 3 February 1891	Jean Thomas Raoul Bonnal, Acting Resident-Superior	2nd time
3 February 1891 to 27 October 1891	Ernest Albert Brière, Resident-Superior	2nd time
27 October 1891 to 20 July 1893	Léon Jean Laurent Chavassieux, Resident-Superior	1st time
20 July 1893 to 30 March 1895	François Pierre Rodier, Resident-Superior	Acting to 15 October 1894
30 March 1895 to 13 May 1895	Louis Paul Luce, Acting Resident-Superior	
13 May 1895 to 18 June 1895	Léon Jean Laurent Chavassieux, Acting Resident-Superior	2nd time
18 July 1895 to 9 March 1897	Paul Julien Auguste Fourès, Resident-Superior	1st time
1897	Léon Jules Paul Boulloche, Resident-Superior	
26 July 1897 to 30 August 1905	Paul Julien Auguste Fourès, Resident-Superior	2nd time
30 August 1905 to 2 April 1907	Élie Jean-Henri Groleau, Acting Resident-Superior	
April 1907 to July 1907	Louis Alphonse Bonhoure, Resident-Superior	
July 1907 to April 1909	Louis Jules Morel, Resident-Superior	
April 1909 to September 1909	Marie Joseph Ulderic de Miribel, Acting Resident-Superior	
September 1909 to August 1912	Paul Simoni, Resident-Superior	
20 August 1912 to 15 December 1912	Jean-François dit Eugène Charles, Acting Resident-Superior	
16 December 1912 to 8 June 1915	Léon Louis Jean Georges Destenay, Resident-Superior	
8 June 1915 to 1917	Maurice Joseph Le Gallen, Resident-Superior	
4 December 1917 to 1919	Jean Baptiste Édouard Bourcier de Saint-Chaffray, Resident-Superior	
22 August 1919 to 1921	Louis Félix Marie Edouard Rivet, Acting Resident-Superior	
27 February 1921 to 1924	Maurice Antoine François Monguillot, Resident-Superior	
5 July 1924 to 10 November 1924	Jean Adrien Gaston Poulin, Acting Resident-Superior	
13 November 1924 to 2 December 1925	Jean-Félix Krautheimer, Acting Resident-Superior	
2 December 1925 to 1930	Eugène Jean Louis René Robin, Resident-Superior	
28 February 1927 to 7 August 1928	Maurice Fernand Graffeuil, Acting Resident-Superior	Acting for Robin
7 August 1928 to 26 December 1928	Jules Marie Douguet, Acting Resident-Superior	Acting for Robin
25 November 1930 to 1937	Auguste Eugène Ludovic Tholance, Resident-Superior	
27 July 1933 to 10 September 1933	Joseph Jules Bride, Acting Resident-Superior	Acting for Tholance
1937	Pierre Abel Delsalle, Acting Resident-Superior	
1937 to 1939	Yves Charles Châtel, Resident-Superior	
8 February 1939 - 1939	Maurice Emile Henry de Tastes, Acting Resident-Superior	
25 August 1939 to 1940	Henri Georges Rivoal, Acting Resident-Superior	
16 November 1940 to 1941	Émile Louis François Grandjean, Resident-Superior	Interim to 11 December 1940
18 June 1941 to 1942	Edouard André Delsalle, Resident-Superior	
21 November 1942 to 1944	Jean Marie Norbert Haelewyn, Resident-Superior	Acting to 16 March 1943
23 August 1944 to 9 March 1945	Paul Louis Gabriel Chauvet, Acting Resident-Superior	
Japanese Suzerainty
March 1945 to August 1945	Nishimura Kumao, Resident	
Vietnamese Administration
17 April 1945 to 17 August 1945	Phan Ke Toai, Imperial Lieutenant	
17 August 1945 to August 1945	Nguyen Xuan Chu, Imperial Lieutenant	
French Suzerainty
18 August 1945 to 1945	Pierre Messmer, Acting Commissioner	
4 October 1945 to 1947	Jean Roger Sainteny, Commissioner	
18 February 1947 to 2 December 1947	Miguel Joaquim de Pereyra, Acting Commissioner	
2 December 1947 to August 1949	Yves Jean Digo, Commissioner	Acting to 20 March 1948
8 August 1949 to 28 November 1949	Raymond Gilbert Félix Koch, Acting Commissioner	
28 November 1949 to 10 November 1950	Marcel Jean Marie Alessandri, Commissioner	
10 November 1950 to 6 January 1951	Pierre Georges Jacques Marie Boyer de La Tour du Moulin, Commissioner	
6 January 1951 to 7 February 1951	Raoul Albin Louis Salan, Acting Commissioner	
7 February 1951 to 27 April 1953	François Jean Antonin Marie Amédée Gonzales de Linarès, Commissioner	

== See also ==
- History of Vietnam
- Tonkin Campaign
- Pacification of Tonkin
- Tonkin Expeditionary Corps
- French colonial empire
- French Indochina
