= Phước Long, Vĩnh Long =

Phước Long
- Commune
- Location in Vietnam
- Coordinates: 10°9′15″N 106°24′33″E
- Country: Vietnam
- Province: Vĩnh Long

Area
  - Land: 5.74 sq mi (14.87 km^{2})

Population (1999)
  - Total: 9,133
- Time zone: UTC+07:00 (Indochina Time)
- Area code: 29020

Phước Long is a rural commune (xã), of Vĩnh Long Province. It is well known for its coconut farms.
