= Imperial City of Huế =

Walled complex in Huế, Vietnam

Imperial Palace
UNESCO World Heritage Site
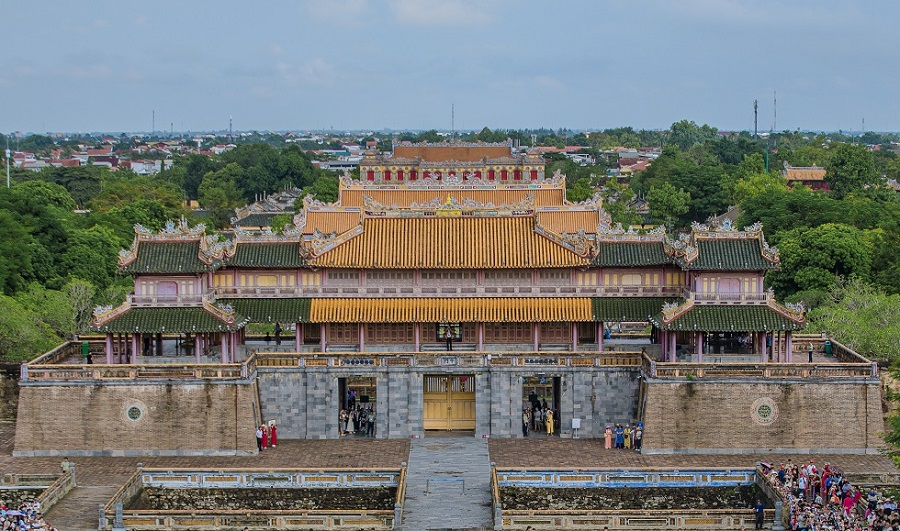
- The Meridian Gate, southern gate of the Imperial palace in 2024
- Official name: Hoàng thành
- Location: Huế, Vietnam
- Part of: "Citadel of Huế, including Imperial City, Purple Forbidden City, Royal Canal, Museum of Huế, National University, Lake of the Serene Heart" part of Complex of Huế Monuments
- Criteria: Cultural: (iv)
- Reference: 678-001
- Inscription: 1993 (17th Session)
- Area: 159.71 ha (394.7 acres)
- Buffer zone: 71.93 ha (177.7 acres)
- Coordinates: 16°28′11″N 107°34′40″E

The Imperial City or Imperial Palace (Vietnamese: Hoàng thành; chữ Hán: 皇城) also known as Đại Nội (大內), is a royal enclosure within the walled city (Vietnamese: Kinh thành; chữ Hán: 京城) of Huế, the former imperial capital of Vietnam during the Nguyễn dynasty. It contains the palaces that housed the imperial family, as well as shrines, gardens, and offices for mandarins. Constructed in 1804 under Emperor Gia Long as a new capital and later re-modelled and enlarged to its current scale in 1833, it mostly served as a ceremonial function and imperial residence during the French colonial period. After the end of the monarchy in 1945, it suffered heavy damage and neglect during the Indochina Wars through the 1980s. The Imperial City was designated as a UNESCO World Heritage Site in 1993 as part of the Complex of Huế Monuments and is undergoing restoration.

== History ==
=== Nguyễn dynasty ===
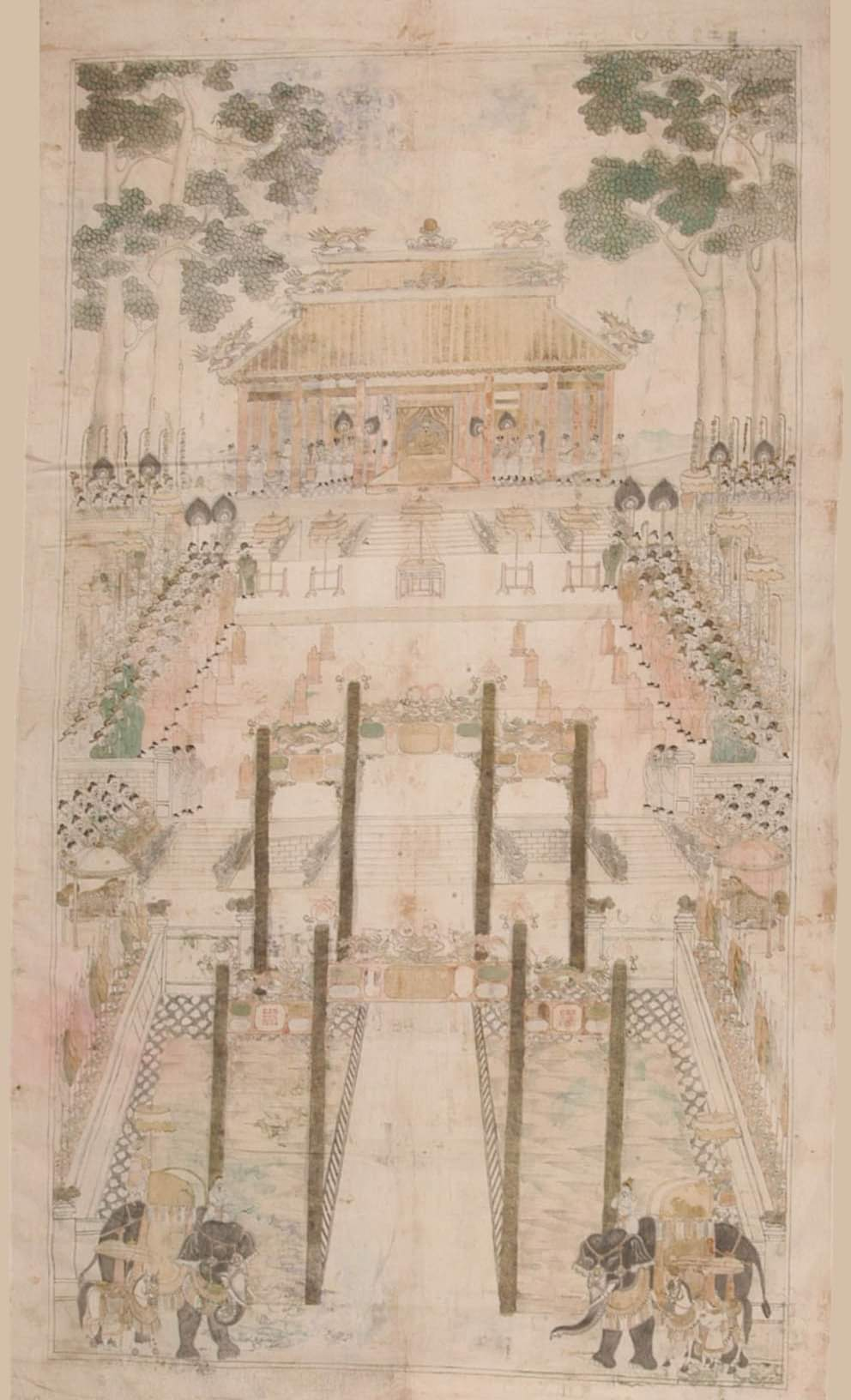
Silk painting depicting Huế imperial court, 19th century

Since the era of the Nguyen Lords, Huế (formally known as Phú Xuân) had been chosen as the capital of Đàng Trong. From 1635 to 1687, Duke Nguyễn Phúc Lan and Nguyễn Phúc Tần built the palace in Kim Long district which was located on the left of the later modern citadel. During the reign of Nguyễn Phúc Thái and Nguyễn Phúc Khoát, the palace was moved to Phú Xuân in the years 1687-1712 and 1739–1774. During the Tây Sơn dynasty, Hue was still chosen by Emperor Quang Trung as the capital of his kingdom in 1789. In June 1802, after more than a century of division and the defeat of the Tây Sơn dynasty, lord Nguyễn Phúc Ánh ascended the throne of a unified Vietnam and proclaimed himself Emperor Gia Long. With a nation now stretching from the Red River Delta to the Mekong Delta, Emperor Gia Long chose the ancestral seat of Nguyễn Lords as well as former capital of Tây Sơn dynasty. Adopting Confucianism and Chinese models of statecraft as the best methods of absolute authority, he ordered the construction of a palace complex based on Beijing's Forbidden City model at Huế. Geomancers were consulted as to a propitious location site for the new city, and construction of Vauban style citadel and the imperial palace began in 1803 and 1804 respectively. Thousands of workers were ordered to build the walled citadel and ringing moat, measuring some 10 kilometres (6.2 mi) long. The original earthwork was later reinforced and faced with brick and stone resulting in 2 m (6 ft 7 in)-thick ramparts.

The citadel was oriented to face the Hương River (Perfume River) to the southeast. This differs from Beijing's Forbidden City, which faces true south. Rather than concentric rings centered on the emperor's palace, the imperial residence itself is offset toward the southeast side of the citadel, nearer the river. A second set of tall walls and a second moat were constructed around this Imperial City, within which many edifices were added in a series of gated courtyards, gardens, pavilions and palaces. The entire complex was the seat of power until the imposition of the French protectorate in the 1880s. Thereafter it existed mostly to carry on symbolic traditions until the Nguyễn dynasty was ousted in 1945, with the Declaration of Independence of the Democratic Republic of Vietnam. The abdication ceremony of Emperor Bảo Đại took place at the Imperial City on 30 August 1945.

=== Oppositions to geographical landscape of Hue ===
Choosing Phú Xuân as the capital exposed three critical disadvantages:

- The first is the narrow natural landscape and isolated geographical location. Hue is located in the center of a small, narrow and sparsely populated plain, making it difficult to mobilize a large resource to respond to an emergency in the other regions. This place was dependent on food and taxes from other regions, as evidenced by the fact that when Tây Sơn dynasty captured Quy Nhơn and isolate Nguyễn's domain from the Southern provinces which was the primary rice production resource. Then Hue fell into a food crisis and could not defend itself.
- The second is its location far from both economic and military centers of Vietnam that are the Red River Delta and the Mekong River Delta. The annual transportation of rice, food, soldiers, minted money between Gia Định - Hue - Hanoi was a huge burden with manpower at that time.
- The third is the location closed to coastal line which is open border. Therefore; it is difficult to defend if Thuận An estuary is isolated by the enemy navy (as France did in 1883).

Some Nguyen dynasty's rulers were also somewhat aware of the disadvantages of establishing the capital in Hue. However; they had no other better choice, because Phu Xuan and middle region of Vietnam had been the capital of the Nguyen Lords since 16th century. While many people in the North Vietnam at that time still showed some loyalty to the former later Le dynasty and opposed the Nguyen dynasty's rule. Therefore; it was likely risky to establish the capital in Hanoi.

In 1822, British Ambassador John Crawfurd visited Vietnam and commented that choosing Hue as the capital was a bad idea. Crawfurd believed that Vietnam would be the Asian country to be the most easily conquered by Europe. The two regions of Hanoi and Saigon were both far from the capital and often had rebellions. The military garrisons and arsenals in the capital were all located close to the coast, making them vulnerable to be attacked by gunboats and landing troops. The Central region (including the capital Hue) depended on supplies and food from the North and the South by sea, which could easily be cut off by enemy navies.

=== Post-dynastic era ===
In its prime, the Purple Forbidden City had many buildings and hundreds of rooms. Once vacated, it suffered from neglect, termite ravages, and inclement weather including a number of cyclones. Most destructive were man-made crises, as evidenced by the bullet holes still visible from the military conflicts of the 20th century.

Major losses occurred in 1947 when the Việt Minh seized the Citadel in February. The French led counter-attack operations where they laid siege and engaged in a six-week ensuing battle which destroyed many of the major structures. The core of the city, including the Imperial Palace, was burned.

The Citadel came under fire again in the early morning of January 31, 1968. As part of the Tet Offensive, a Division-sized force of the People's Army of Vietnam and Viet Cong soldiers launched a coordinated attack on Huế, seizing most of the city. During the initial phases of the Battle of Huế, due to Huế's religious and cultural status, the U.S. Marines troops were ordered not to bomb or shell the city, for fear of destroying the historic structures; but as casualties mounted in house-to-house fighting, these restrictions were progressively lifted and the fighting caused substantial damage to the Imperial City. Viet Cong troops occupied some portions of the citadel while South Vietnamese troops occupied others; and allied warplanes targeted the anti-aircraft guns the communists had mounted on the citadel's outer towers. Out of 160 buildings, only 10 major sites remain after the battle, such as the Thái Hòa and Cần Thanh temples, Thế Miếu, and Hiển Lâm Các.

The city was made a UNESCO World Heritage site in 1993 as part of the Complex of Huế Monuments. The buildings that remain are being restored and preserved. The latest, and so far largest, restoration project was planned to conclude in 2015.

== Layout ==
The grounds of the Imperial City are protected by fortified ramparts 2 by 2 kilometres (1.2 by 1.2 mi), and ringed by a moat. The water in the moat is routed from the Hương River through a series of sluice gates. This enclosure is the citadel (Kinh thành).

Inside the citadel is the Imperial City (Vietnamese: Hoàng thành; chữ Hán: 皇城), with a perimeter wall some 2.5 kilometres (1.6 mi) in length.

Within the Imperial City is the Purple Forbidden City (Vietnamese: Tử cấm thành; chữ Hán: 紫禁城), a term identical to the Forbidden City in Beijing. Access to the innermost enclosure was restricted to the imperial family.

== Citadel of Huế ==
Hue Citadel (Vietnamese: Kinh thành; chữ Hán: 京城) was surveyed by Emperor Gia Long in 1803 and the construction began in 1805 and was completed in 1832 under the reign of emperor Minh Mang. In the history of modern Vietnam, the construction of Hue Citadel was regarded as the most massive and large-scale project with tens of thousands of people participating in the construction, millions of cubic meters of earth and rock and huge amount of work like digging trenches, rivers, site clearance, building walls... lasting for 30 years under two first emperor. Only the emperor and his family was allowed to reside in the citadel while commoners was banned to enter except court ladies, eunuchs and soldiers served inside the palace. Besides that, officials and students of imperial academy were allowed to enter the citadel and had to exit after working hours. During French occupation, French colonial government establish their office at the north of citadel so they were the only foreigner with privilege to reside inside the fortress.

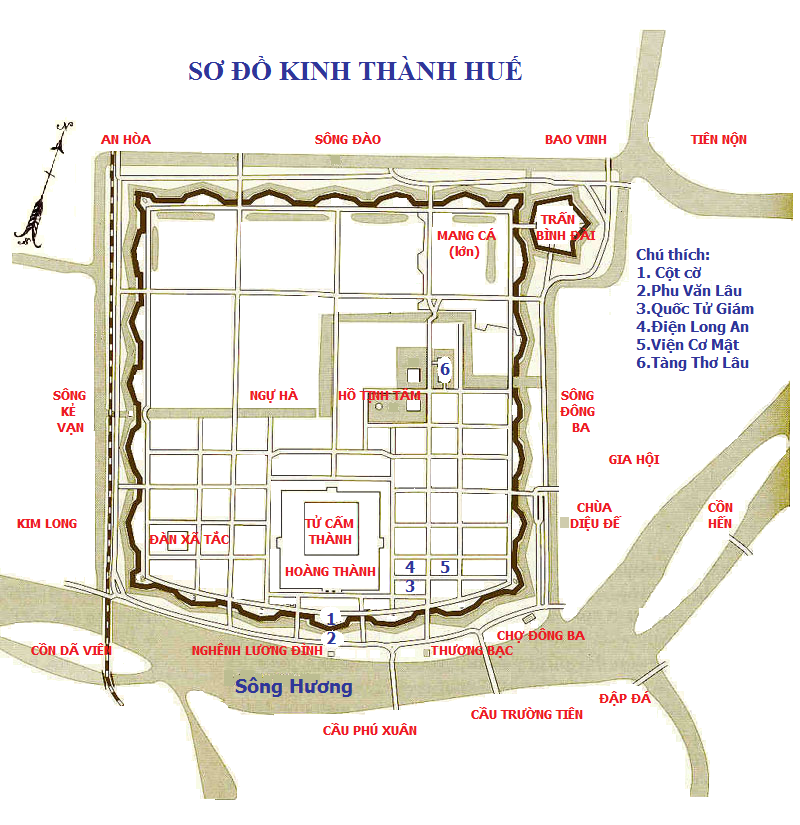
Map of imperial citadel (京城).
1: Flag tower; 2: Phu Văn lâu; 3: Imperial Academy; 4: Điện Long An; 5: Privy council office; 6: Imperial library.

=== Architecture ===
Hue Citadel was built based on the Vauban style fortification. Immediately after ascending the throne, Gia Long conducted a survey to select a location to build a new citadel. Finally, he chose a large area on the north bank of the Perfume River, including the land of the villages of Phu Xuan, Van Xuan, Dien Phai, An Van, An Hoa, An My, An Bao, The Lai, and part of the two rivers Bach Yen and Kim Long as the place to build the citadel. In terms of feng shui, the front of the citadel is Mount Ngự Bình, which is more than 100 meters high, with a flat top, beautiful shape and balanced, lying in the middle of the plain like a natural screen protecting the citadel. On both sides are small islands called Cồn Hến and Cồn Dã Viên, represent 2 of Four Symbols: Thanh Long (Azure Dragon) on the left and Bạch Hổ (White tiger) on the right forming the perfect position to represent imperial power.

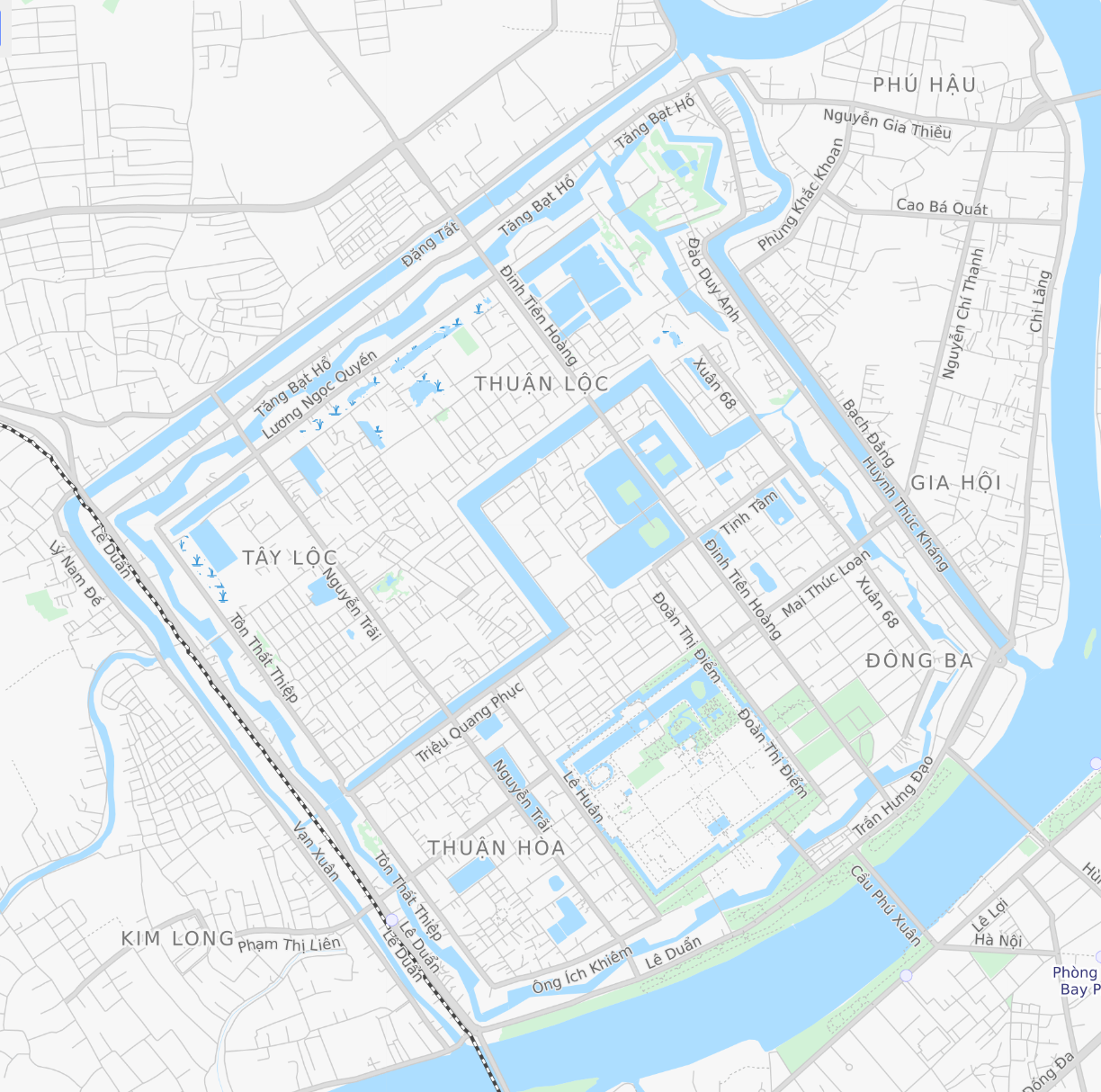
Vauban-style imperial citadel from google map.

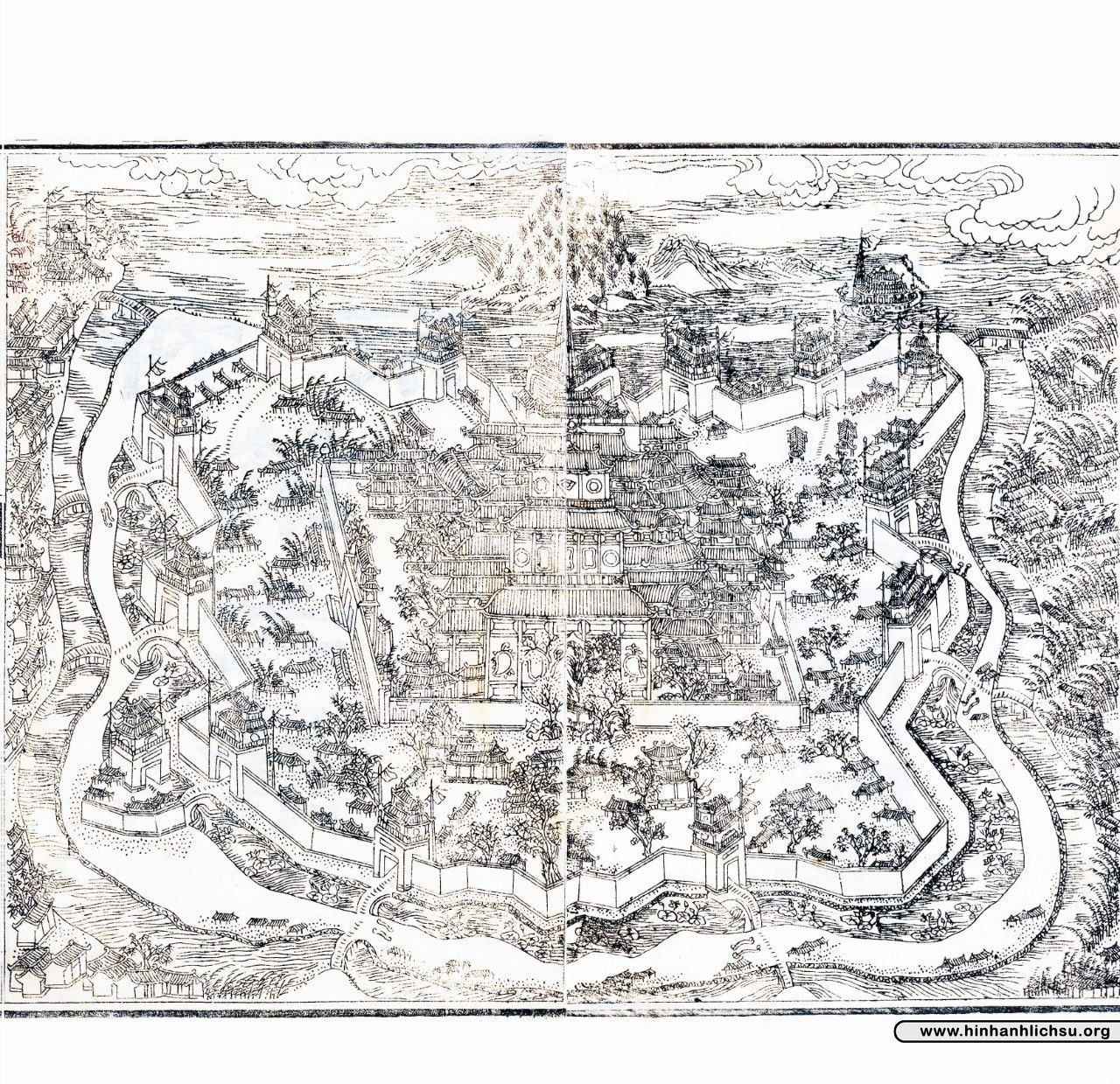
Woodcut miniature map of Hue Citadel in 1845, the Imperial Palace is depicted in the middle (not to scale)

The citadel has a circumference of nearly 10 km which is 6.6 m high, 21 m thick, built in zigzag shape with forts installed at regular intervals and it was accompanied by artillery guns, cannons, and ammunition depots. The citadel was initially built with only earth, and it was not until the end of Gia Long's reign that bricks were used as the primary material.

=== Outer Citadel (Ngoại Thành, 外城) ===
==== Phu Văn Pavilion ====
Phu Văn lâu (敷文樓) is the two-story pavilion facing south located in front of the Flag Tower looking out to the Perfume River. Pavilion was built in the year of the 1819 before imperial examination event by emperor Gia Long, used as a place to display important edicts of the emperor and the court or the results of imperial examinations organized by the court. In 1829, emperor Minh Mang used this place as a venue for the battle of elephant and tiger and 3-days banquet of his birthday in 1830 at here. The list of graduated Tiến sĩ was demonstrated at here and because of its solemnity, on both sides of the building there are two stone steles engraved with the four Chữ Hán words "傾蓋下馬" (Vietnamese: Khuynh Cái Hạ Mã), meaning that anyone passing by must take off their hat and get off their horse to show respect to emperor's edicts.

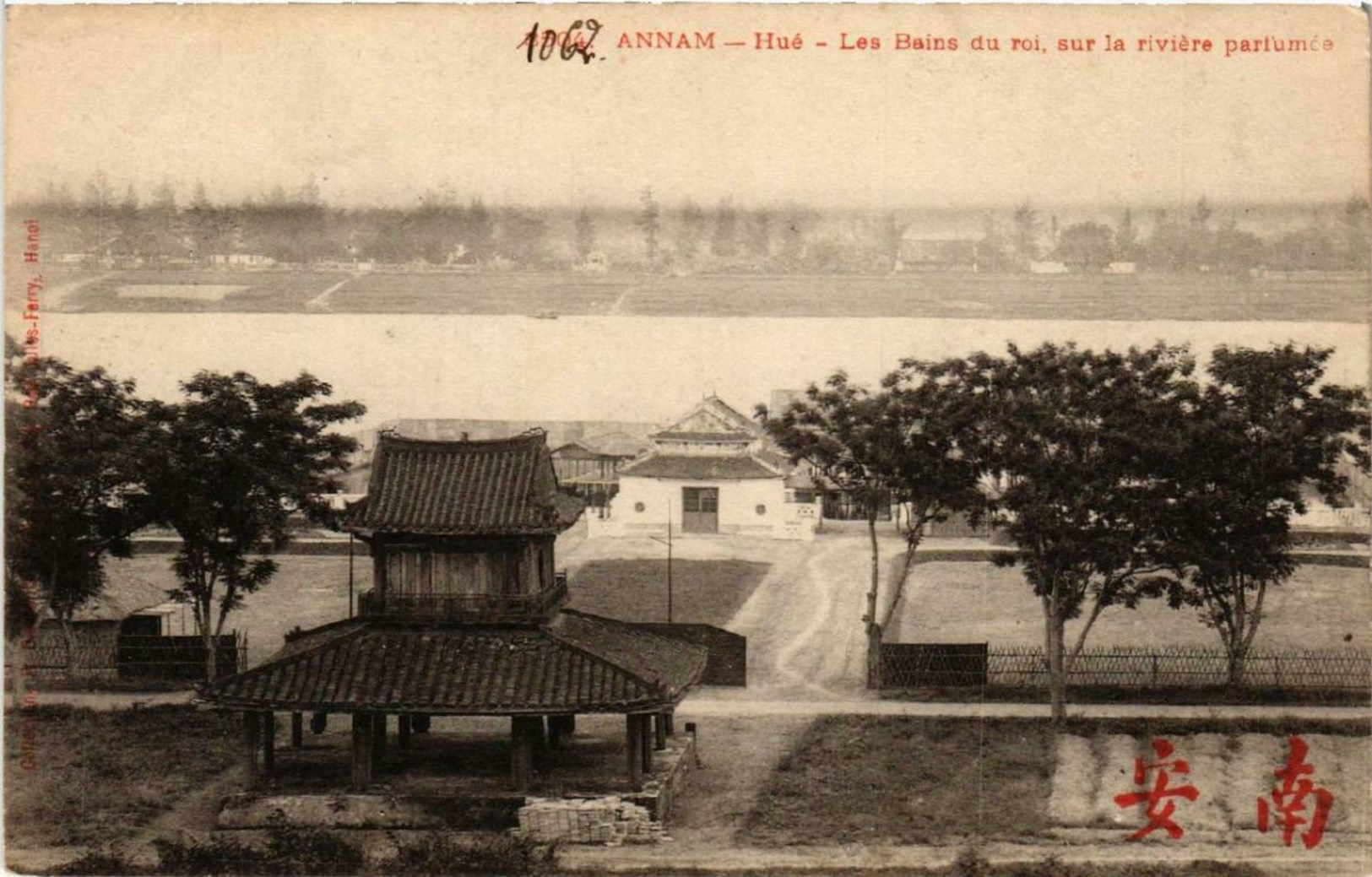
Pavilion in early 20th century.

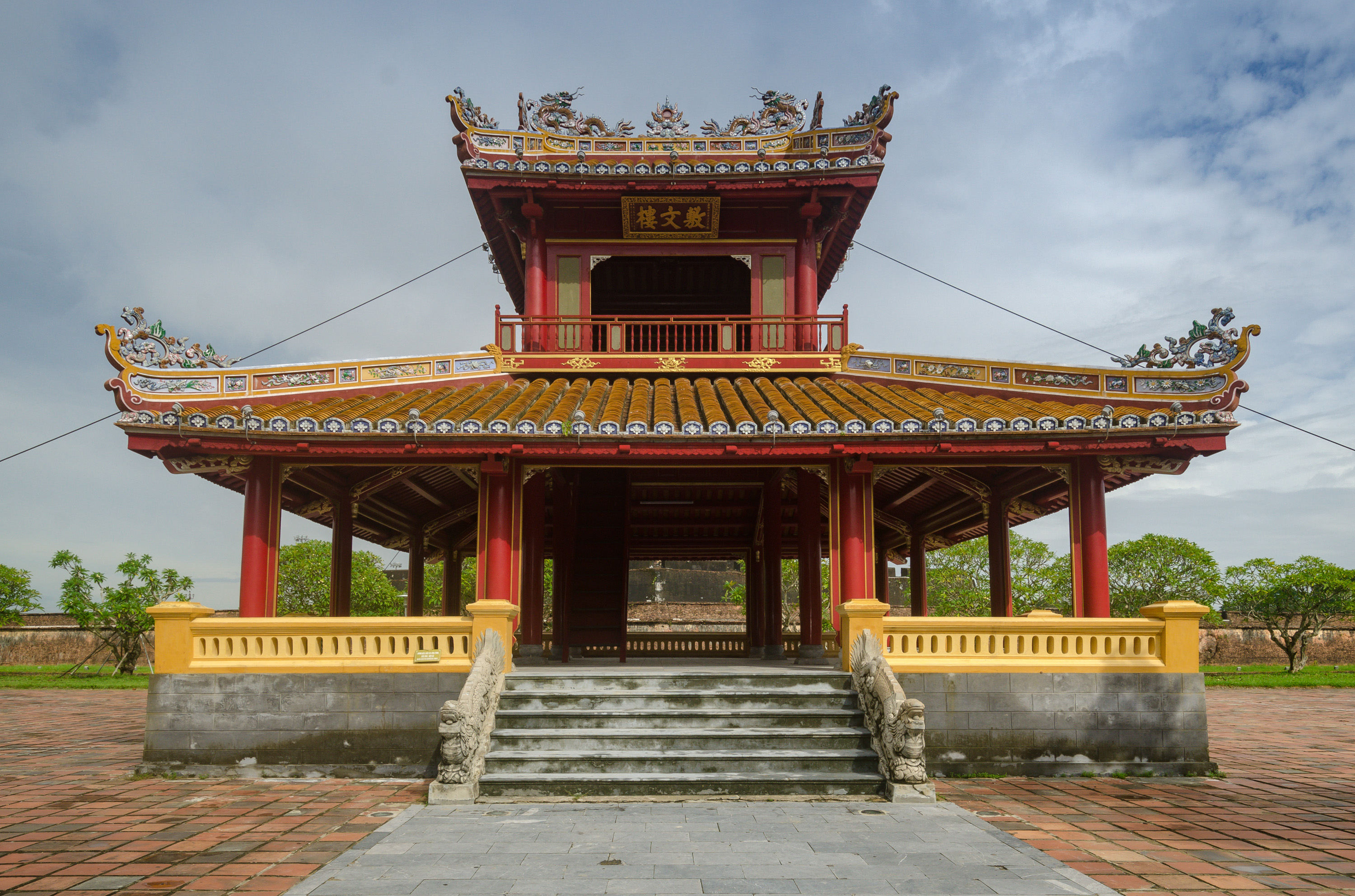
Pavilion in 2017.

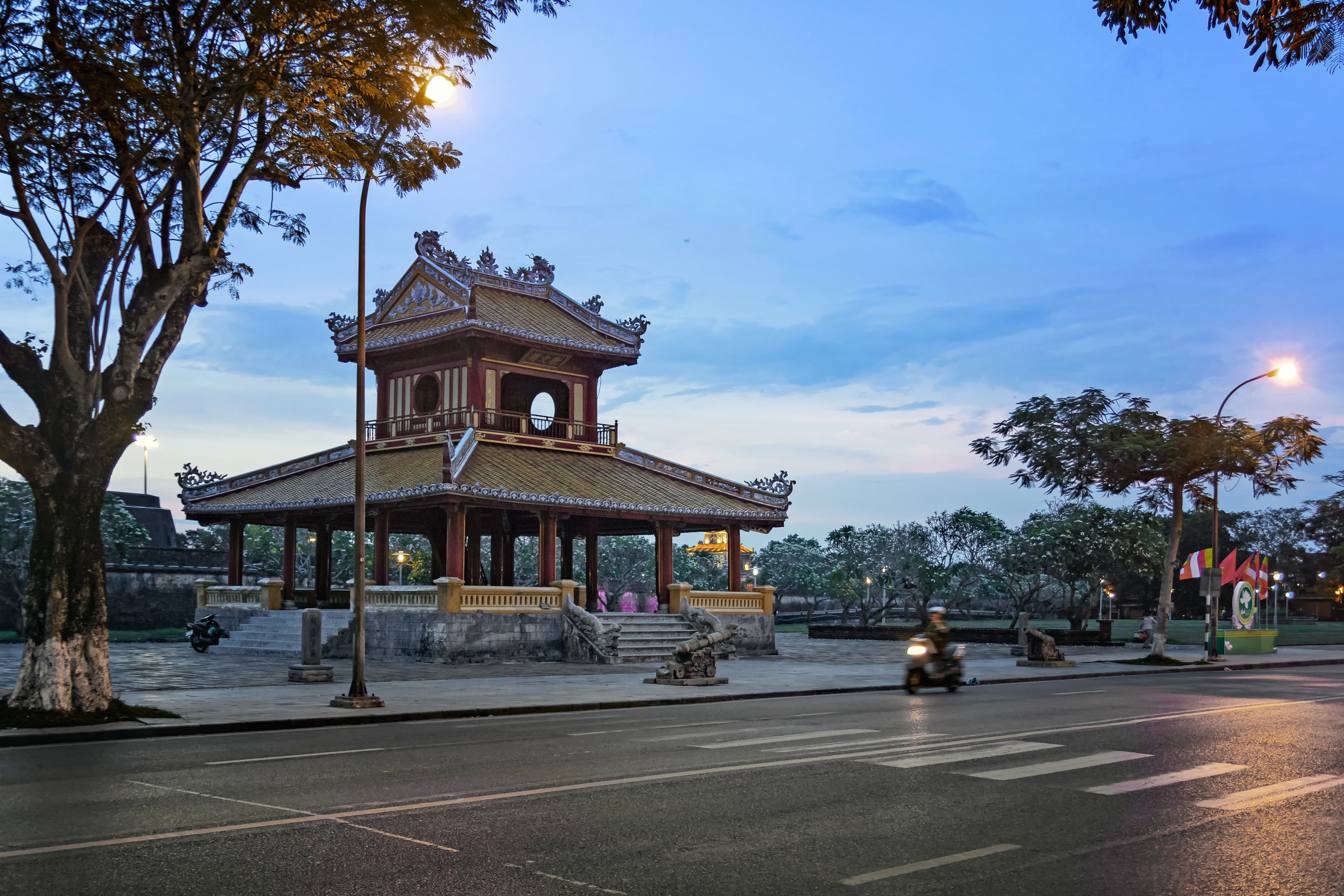
Phu Văn lâu with two bronze cannons with 2 stele inscribed 4 Chữ Hán words "傾蓋下馬". (Vietnamese: Khuynh Cái Hạ Mã).

Although Phu Van Lau has been renovated many times, it still retains the typical architectural features of the Nguyen dynasty. The image of Phu Van Lau is printed on the back of the 50,000 VND note issued since 2003.

==== Nghênh Lương pavilion ====
Nghênh Lương đình (迎涼亭) or Nghênh Lương tạ (迎涼榭) is a structure located on the vertical axis from flag tower to Phu Văn Pavilion, built in the 5th year of Tự Đức (1852), renovated in the 15th year of Thành Thái (1903), later renovated in 3rd year of Khải Định (1918). It was used as emperor's resting place before boarding on boat to go sightseeing on Perfume river. This place is printed on the 50,000 VND banknote of Vietnam

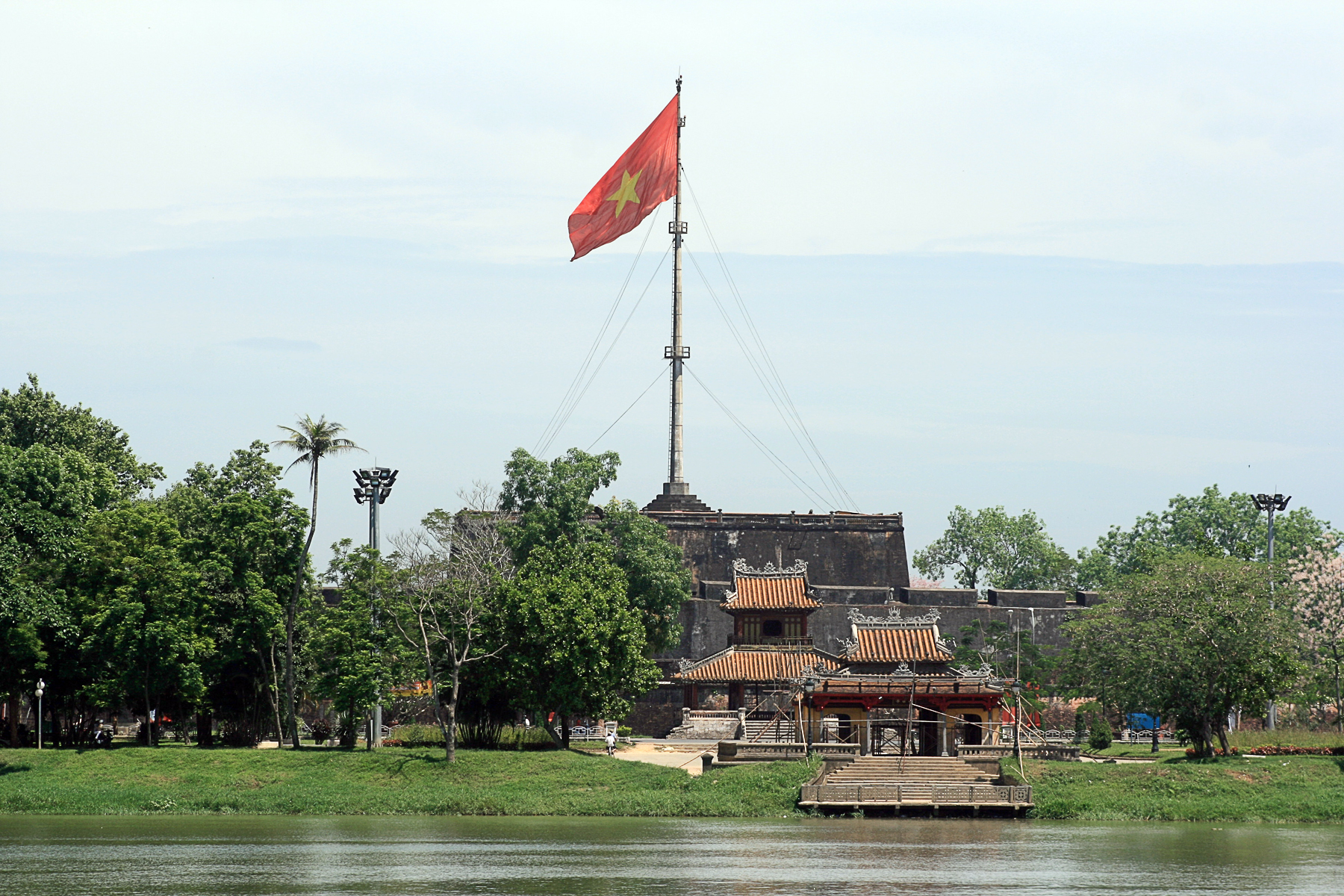
Nghênh Lương pavilion, in front of Phu Văn Pavilion and the Flag Tower during renovation in 2008.

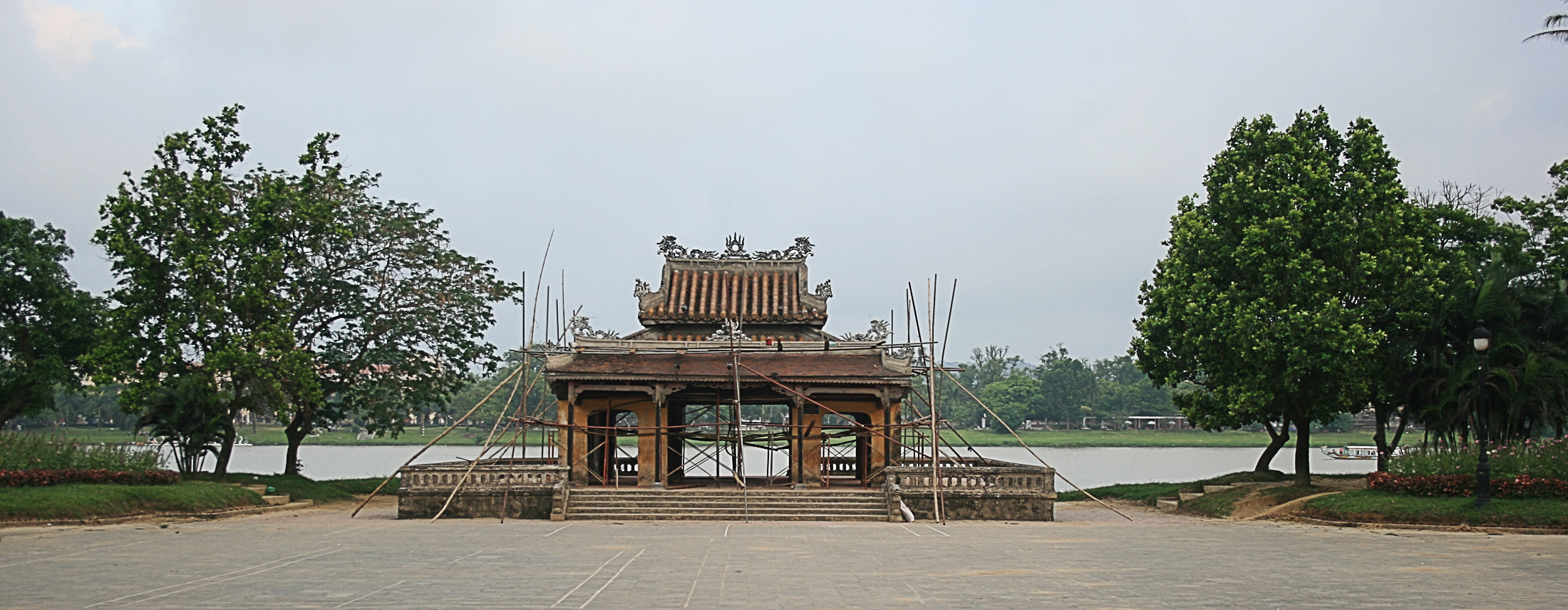
Nghênh Lương pavilion under renovation.

=== Inner citadel (Nội Thành, 內城) ===
==== Flag tower ====
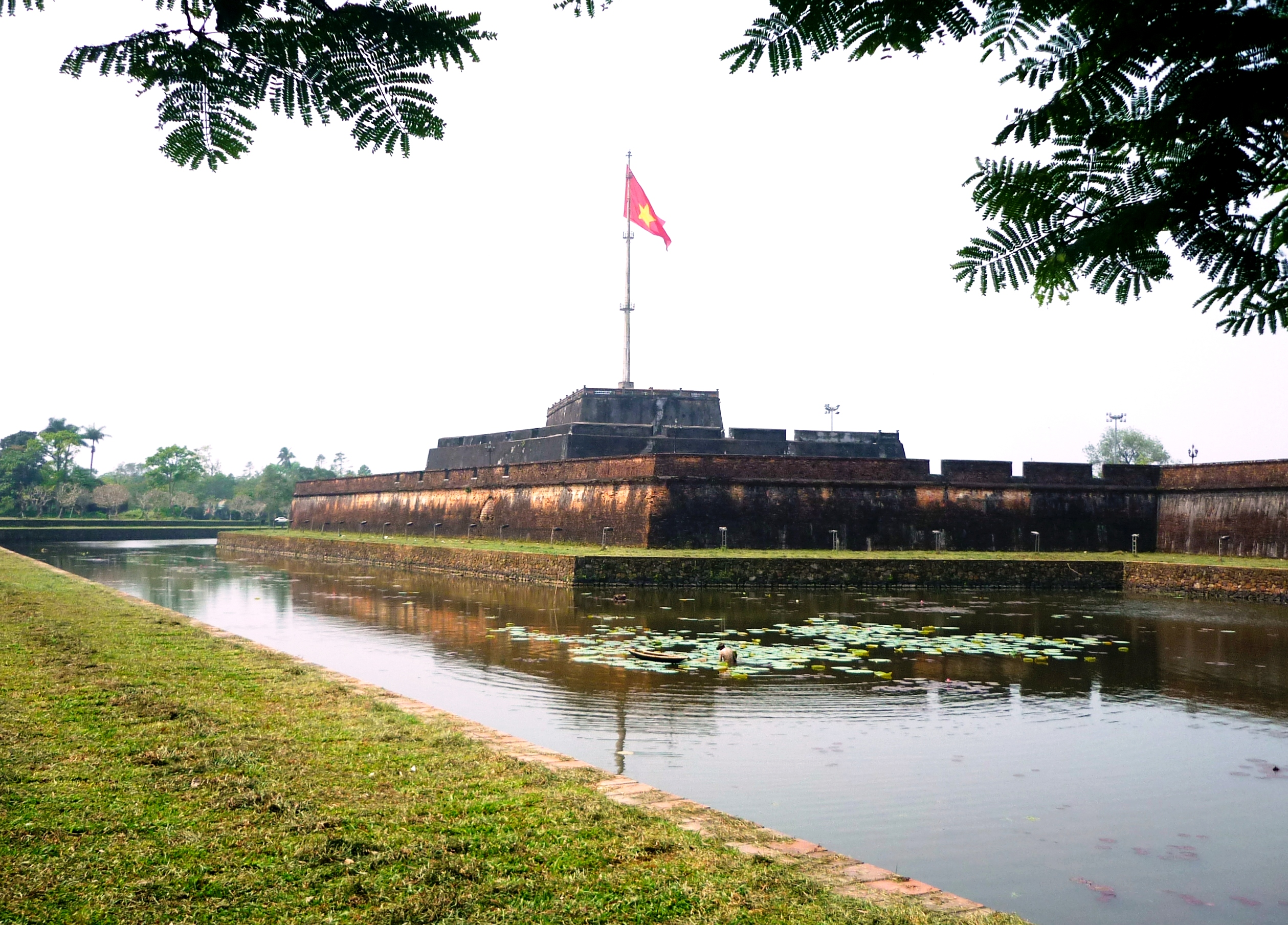
Flag tower (Kỳ Đài, 旗臺) or Cột cờ.

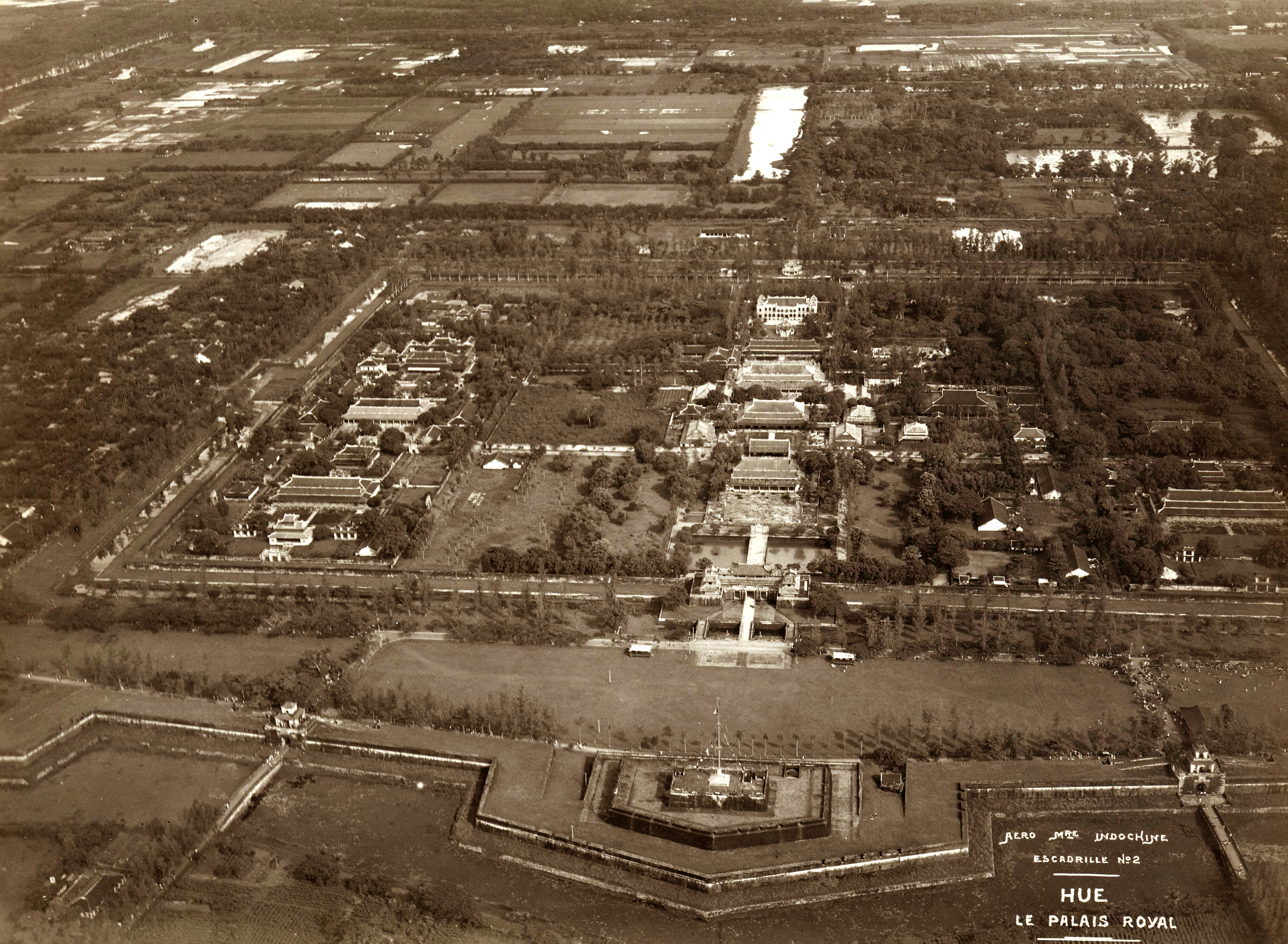
Aerial view of the Imperial citadel and palace during the feast in honor of the return of Emperor Bảo Đại after finishing study in France, 11 September 1932. Flag tower is located at the south of the citadel with Thể Nhơn gate (right) and Quảng Đức gate (left). The palace is located in the middle.

In the middle of the front of the Citadel is a large flag pole called Kỳ Đài (旗臺) or Cột cờ, built in the 6th year of Gia Long (1807). During the reign of emperor Minh Mang, the flagpole was renovated in 1829, 1831 and 1840.

The flagpole consists of two parts: the base and the flagpole. The base consists of three rectangular truncated pyramidal floors stacked on top of each other. The first floor is over 5.5 m high, the middle floor is about 6 m high, and the top floor is over 6 m high. The total height of the three floors is about 17.5 m. From the ground to the lower floor is a small path on the left side of the flagpole. The lower floor is connected to the middle floor by a 4 m wide arched door, the middle floor is connected to the top floor by a 2 m wide arched door. The top of each floor has a 1 m high railing system decorated with hollow-cast bricks. The three-storey foundation is paved with square bricks and bricks and there is a rainwater drainage system below. Previously, there were two watchtowers and eight cannons. The original flagpole was made of wood, with two floors and was nearly 30 m high. In the sixth year of emperor Thieu Tri (1846), the flagpole was replaced by a longer wooden pole over 32 m long. In the sixteenth year of Thanh Thai (1904), this flagpole was damaged by a heavy typhoon, so it was replaced with a cast iron pipe. In 1947, when the French army reoccupied Hue, the flagpole was broken by artillery fire again. In 1948, the current reinforced concrete flagpole built with a total height of 37 m.

During the Nguyen dynasty, Emperor's banner was raised on all occasions of ceremonies, celebrations, tours and even emergency announcement. On top of the flagpole, there was also an observation post called Vọng Đẩu. Occasionally, guards had to climb up Vọng Đẩu and use a telescope to observe the coast. On August 23, 1945, after Bao Dai abdicated, the red flag with yellow star of the Democratic Republic of Vietnam replaced the flag of the Nguyen dynasty.

==== Nine imperial grand cannons ====
Nine grand cannons (Vietnamese: Cửu vị thần công; chữ Hán: 九位神攻) was cast by Hue artisans in the second year of Gia Long (1803). These nine cannons are considered the largest in Vietnam and one of the most valuable bronze works of art. The Nine Cannons were originally placed at the front of the Imperial palace. In 1917, during the reign of Khải Định, these cannons were moved to the current position. In 2012, the Nine Cannons were recognized as a National Treasure of Vietnam.

After defeating the Tây Sơn dynasty in 1802, Emperor Gia Long ordered the collection of all bronze weapons and objects to cast nine cannons standing for his glorious victory. The casting work officially began on 31 January 1803 (Gia Long 2nd year) and was supervised by four people: Commander Nguyễn Văn Khiêm, Chief Commander Hoàng Văn Cẩn, Deputy Commander Ích Văn Hiếu (some document record his name as Cái Văn Hiếu) and Deputy Minister of Public Works Phan Tấn Cẩn. In order to successfully cast these nine cannons, emperor Gia Long carefully selected the most outstanding people, not only in professional qualifications but also possessing noble virtues. The casting of all nine cannons was completed by the end of December 1804.

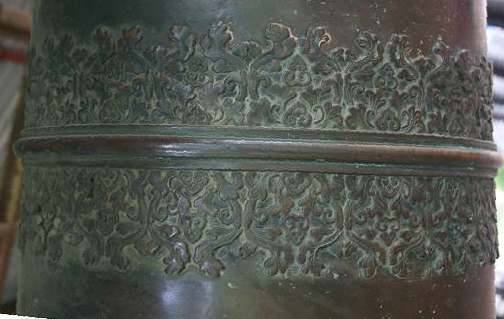
Pattern engraved in cannon.

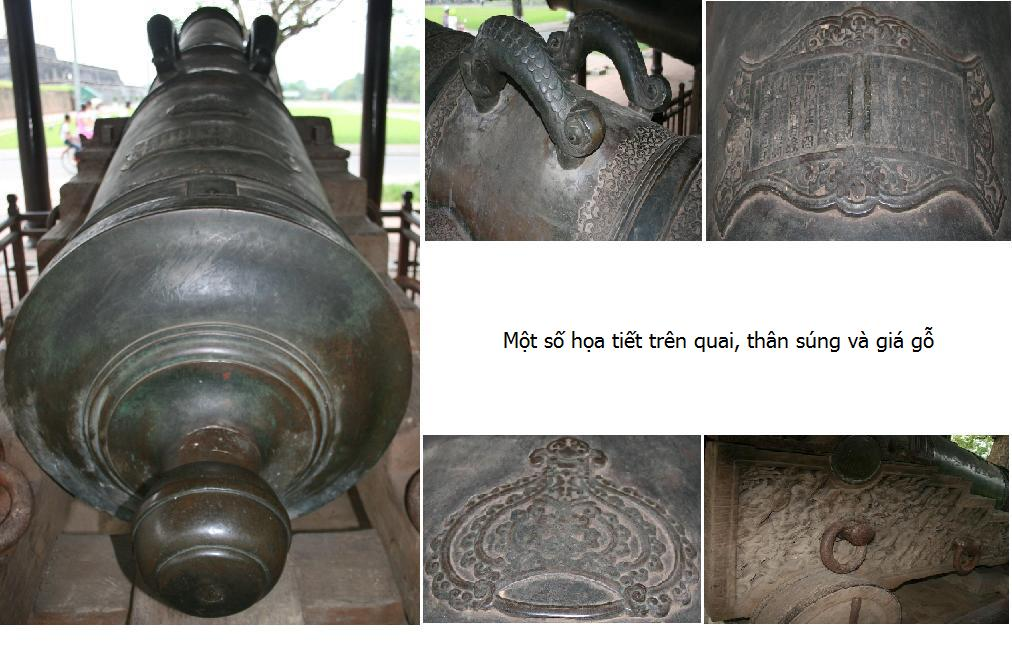
Pattern engraved in cannon.

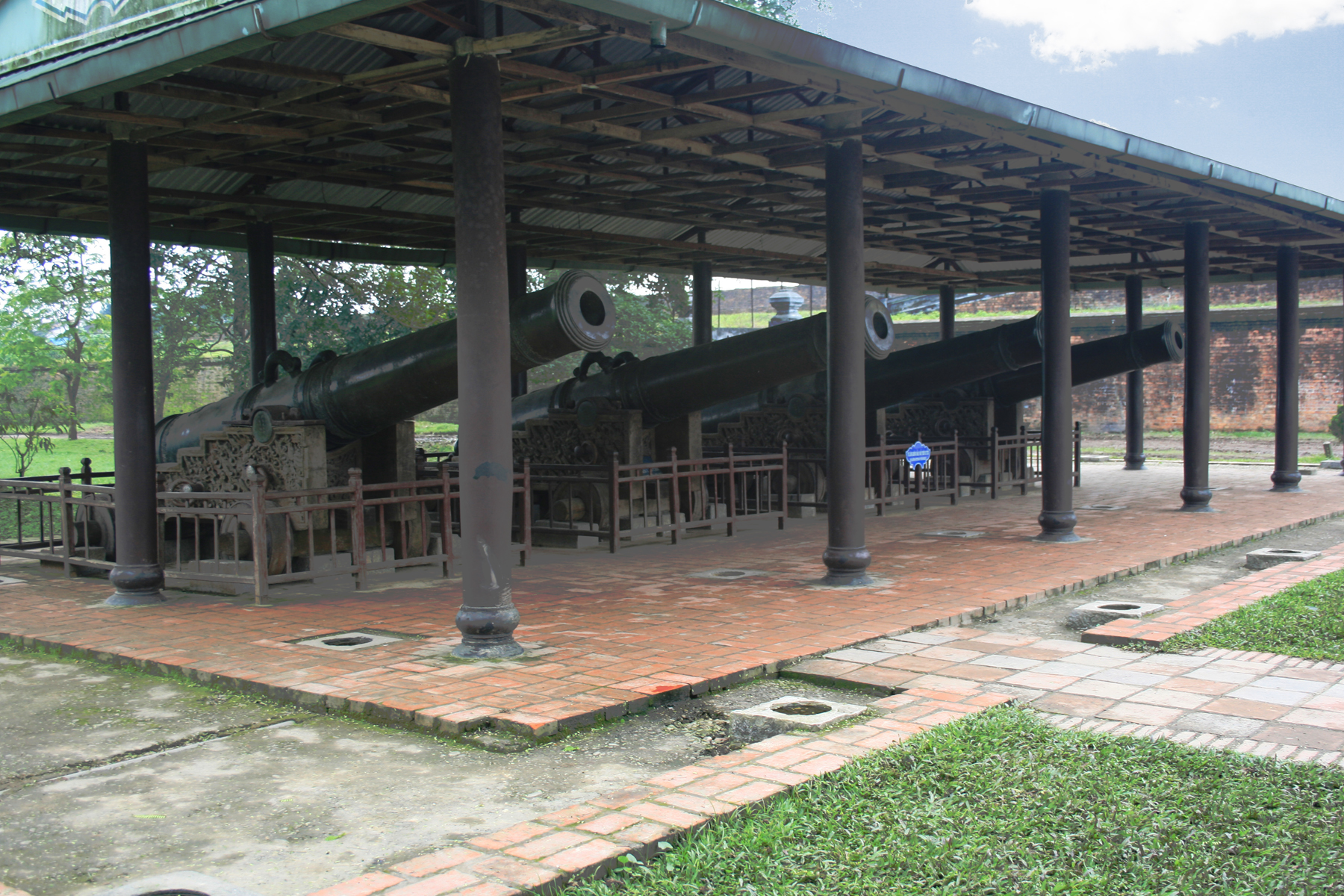
Four cannons named "Spring, Summer, Autumn, Winter" in the current position.

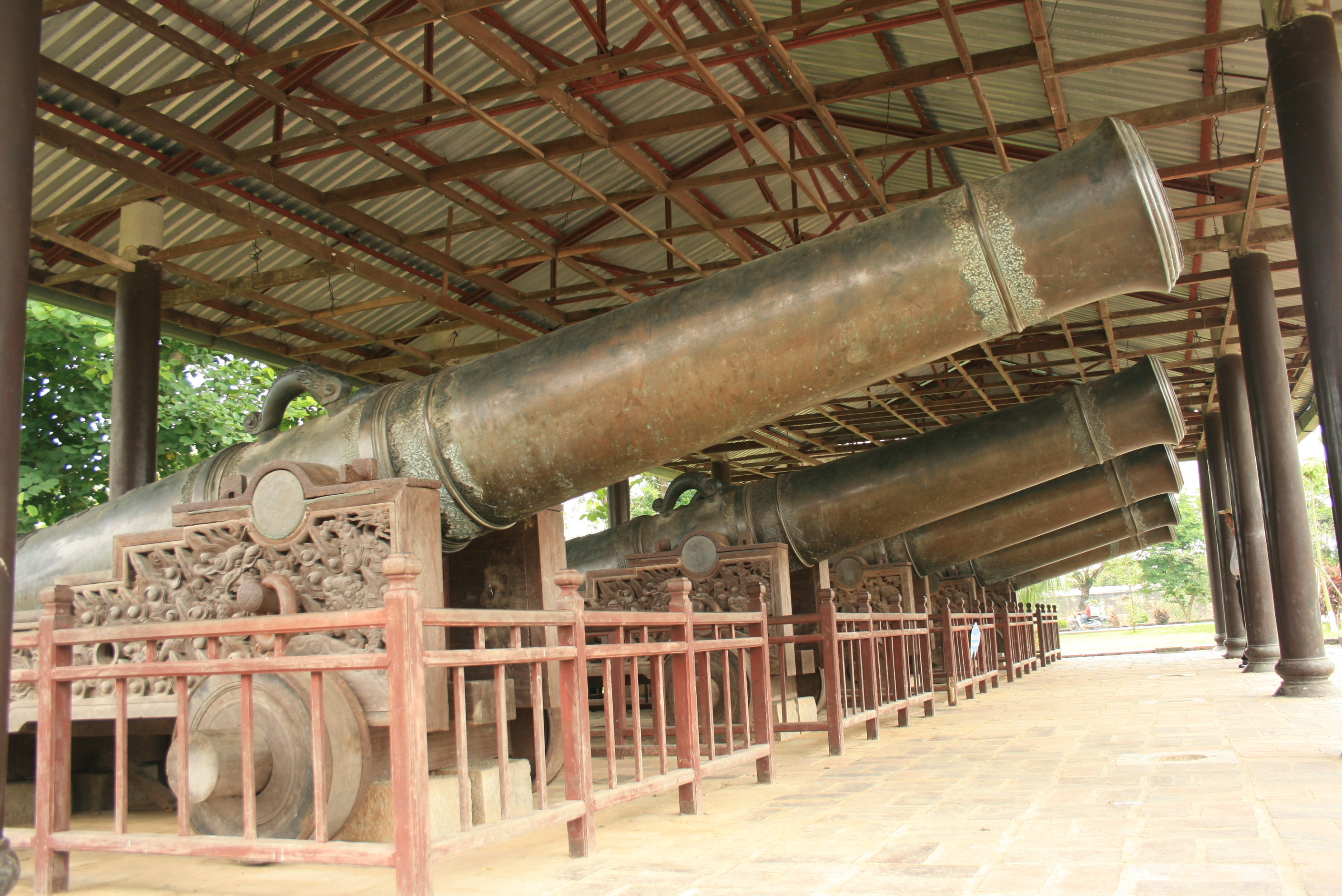
Five cannons named "Metal, Wood, Water, Fire, and Earth" at current position.

In the 15th year of Gia Long (1816), emperor bestowed the title of "Invincible General of the Gods" on all nine cannons. The title and content of edicts were engraved directly on the body of each cannon. Each cannon was meticulously carved with its title, rank, weight, cannon usage instruction, an account of the battles with the Tay Son dynasty and the collection process of bronze to cast the cannons.

The court assigned military officers to regularly guard these nine cannons, and the emperor often held solemn ceremonies to worship the Nine Divine Cannons. Since 1886, under emperor Dong Khanh, the court abolished this worship, but the guards still often worshiped themselves.

These cannons are named after the four seasons and the five elements in the order of "Spring (Xuân, 春)" - "Summer (Hạ, 夏)" - "Autumn (Thu, 秋)" - "Winter (Đông, 冬)" - "Wood (Mộc, 木)" - "Fire (Hỏa, 火)" - "Earth (Thổ, 土)" - "Metal (Kim, 金)" - "Water (Thủy, 水)". The name of each cannon is embossed on the knob at the end of each gun.

==== Citadel gates ====
The fortress has total of 10 gates including:

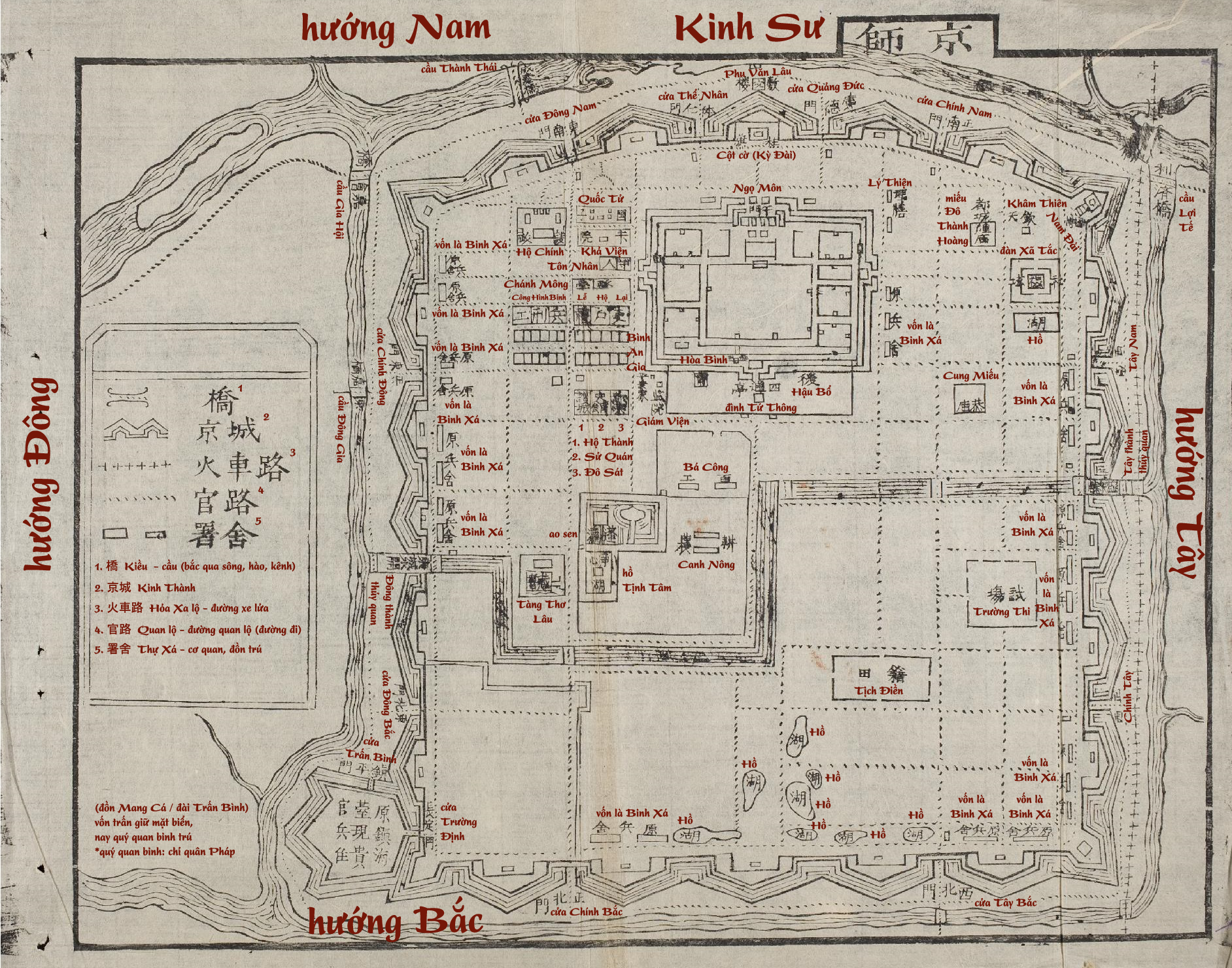
Outline of citadel from southern direction published in Đại Nam nhất thống chí with Vietnamese annotations (Chữ Quốc Ngữ).

+ Southern gates (4 gates from left to right):

- Main South gate (Vietnamese: Chính Nam Môn; chữ Hán: 正南門): it is more commonly called as cửa Nhà Đồ (weapon storage gate), because nearby there was võ khố (武庫), a warehouse for storing weapons, established during Emperor Gia Long period. the gate is located on the left side of Southern wall, built in 1809 and the tower was built in 1829.
- Quảng Đức gate (Vietnamese: Quảng Đức Môn; chữ Hán: 廣德門): one of two main entrance used by emperor to enter the citadel. The gate was built in 1809 and the tower was built in 1829.
- Thể Nhơn gate (Vietnamese: Thể Nhơn Môn; chữ Hán: 體仁門): It is one of two main entrance used by emperor and mandarins. It was commonly called as cửa Ngăn (Blocked gate) because in the past, the soldiers will ban everyone using this gate before emperor prepares to pass it. The gate was built in 1809 and the tower was built in 1829. It had the original name as Thể Nguyên Môn (體元門), received the current name in 1829.
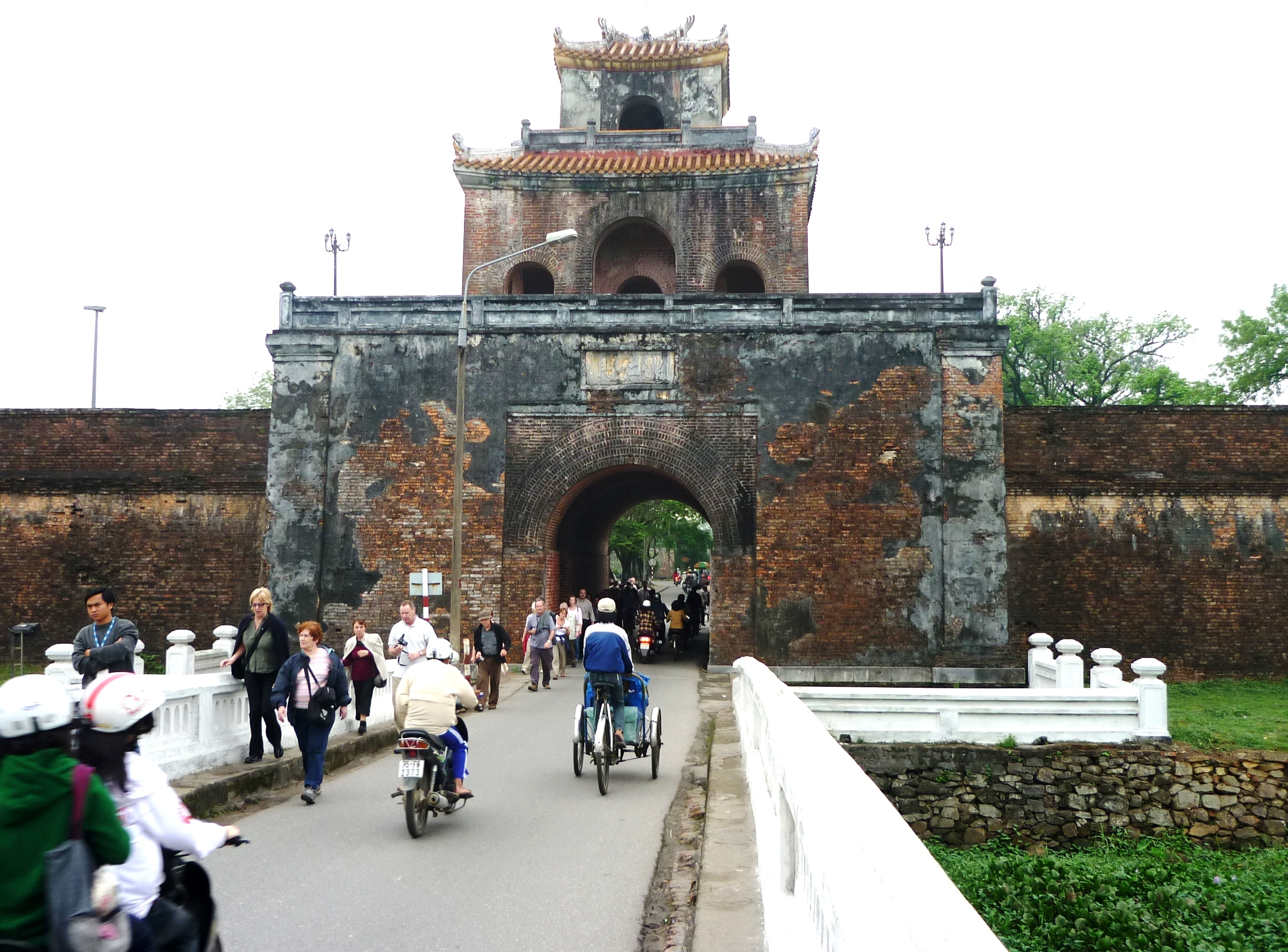
Thể Nhơn gate (體仁門), viewed from outside of citadel.
- Southeast gate (Vietnamese: Đông Nam Môn; chữ Hán: 東南門):It is commonly called as Thượng Tứ gate (上四門) named after the Thượng kỵ Institute (上騎院) - the agency that was responsible fo raising and trainning emperor's horses. At the same time, the emperor's cavalry and carriages were stationed there so that is where the name came from. (Thượng, 上) (means superior which represents the emperor), and (Tứ, 四) (means "four" of four-wheeled carriage pulled by horses). The gate was built in 1809 and the tower was built in 1829.

+ Northern gates (2 gates, from left to right):

- Northwest gate (Vietnamese: Tây Bắc Môn; chữ Hán: 西北門): it is more commonly called as cửa An Hòa (An Hòa gate), named after the village and market right outside of the gate. It is located on the left side of northern wall. The gate was built in 1809 and the tower was built in 1831.
- Main north gate (Vietnamese: Chính Bắc Môn; chữ Hán: 正北門): It was also known as Hậu Môn (back gate, 後門), located at the right of northern wall. The gate was built in 1809 and the tower was built in 1831.

+ Western gates (2 gates, from upper to lower):

- Main west gate (Vietnamese: Chính Tây Môn; chữ Hán: 正西門): located in the upper left of citadel, built in 1809 and the tower was built in 1829.
- Southwest gate (Vietnamese: Tây Nam Môn; chữ Hán: 西南門): it is more commonly called as Hữu Môn (Right gate, 右門), located at the lower left of the citadel. The gate was built in 1809 and the tower was built in 1829. There was the famous event in midnight of 5/7/1885, 14-year-olds Emperor Hàm Nghi and Tôn Thất Thuyết escaped through this gate and flee to Quảng Trị. Then he issued the Cần Vương edict to call all of his subjects to join his resistance movement against French occupation.

+ Eastern gates (2 gates, from upper to lower):

- Northeast gate (Vietnamese: Đông Bắc Môn; chữ Hán: 東北門): it is more commonly called as Cửa Kẻ Trài (Kẻ Trài gate), based on name of the residential area outside the gate. The gate was built in 1809 and the tower was built in 1824.
- Main east gate (Vietnamese: Chính Đông Môn; chữ Hán: 正東門): It was also known as cửa Đông Ba (Đông Ba gate), name of residential area and Đông Ba market out there. The gate was built in 1809 and the tower was built in 1824.

+ Sub gates:

- In addition, the Citadel also has 2 gates connecting with (Trấn Bình đài, 鎮平臺) (small sub-citadel and a bastion in the Northeast corner of the Citadel, also known as "đồn Mang Cá" (Mang Cá bastion), called Trấn Bình Môn (鎮平門) and Trường Định Môn (長定門).
- Two gates by waterway connecting the Citadel with the outside through Ngự Hà river (御河) are Đông Thành Thủy Quan (東城水關, east citadel water gate) built in 1830 and Tây Thành Thủy Quan (西城水關, west citadel water gate) built in 1826.

==== Imperial council office ====
Imperial council headquarter (Vietnamese: Tôn Nhơn phủ; chữ Hán: 尊人府) originally as "Tông Nhân phủ (宗人府)", was the agency of the Nguyen dynasty in charge of the royal family's affairs, taking care of the royal family's books, compiling the family tree of the imperial family, recording the birth and death dates and the personal history of all members of the imperial family, along with worshiping rites. When Emperor Thiệu Trị ascended the throne, because of the Naming taboo issue of his personal's name Miên Tông, the word "Tông (宗)" had to be changed to "Tôn (尊) ". It was located on the right outside of palace, now it is Nguyễn Văn Trỗi park.

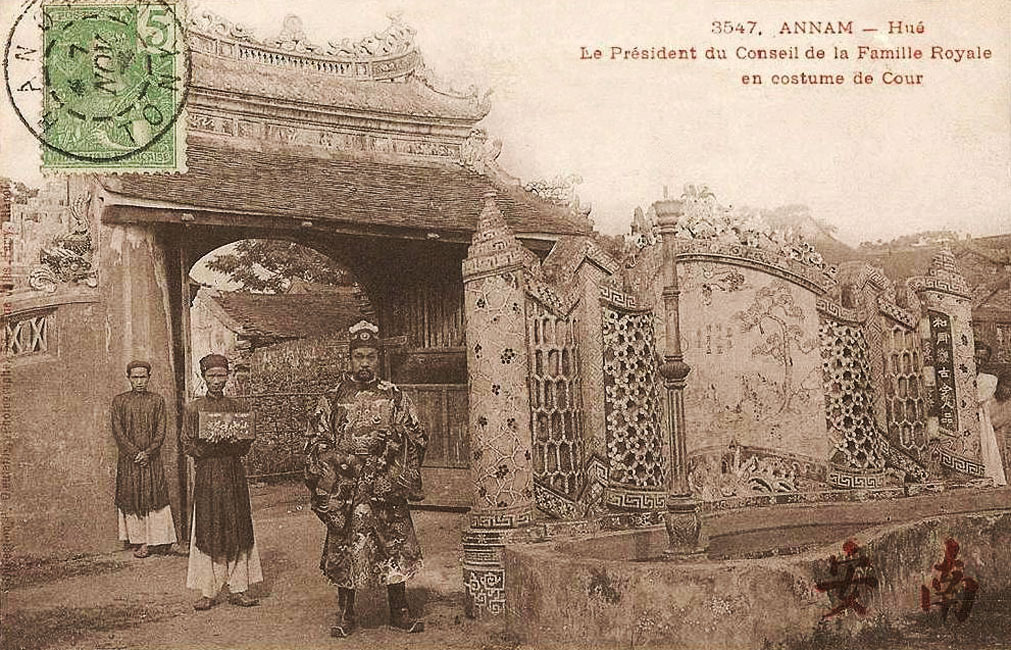
President of the council in the court uniform taken picture with Bình Phong wall at the entrance office.

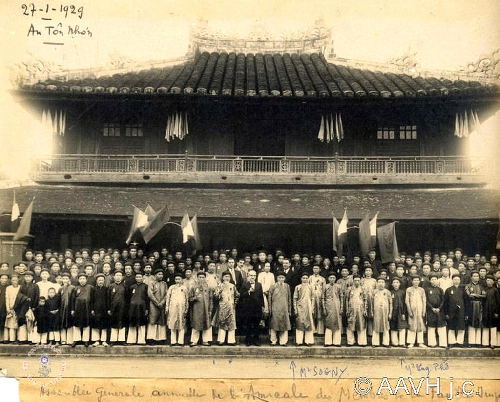
Member of imperial council took picture in front of office in 27/1/1929.

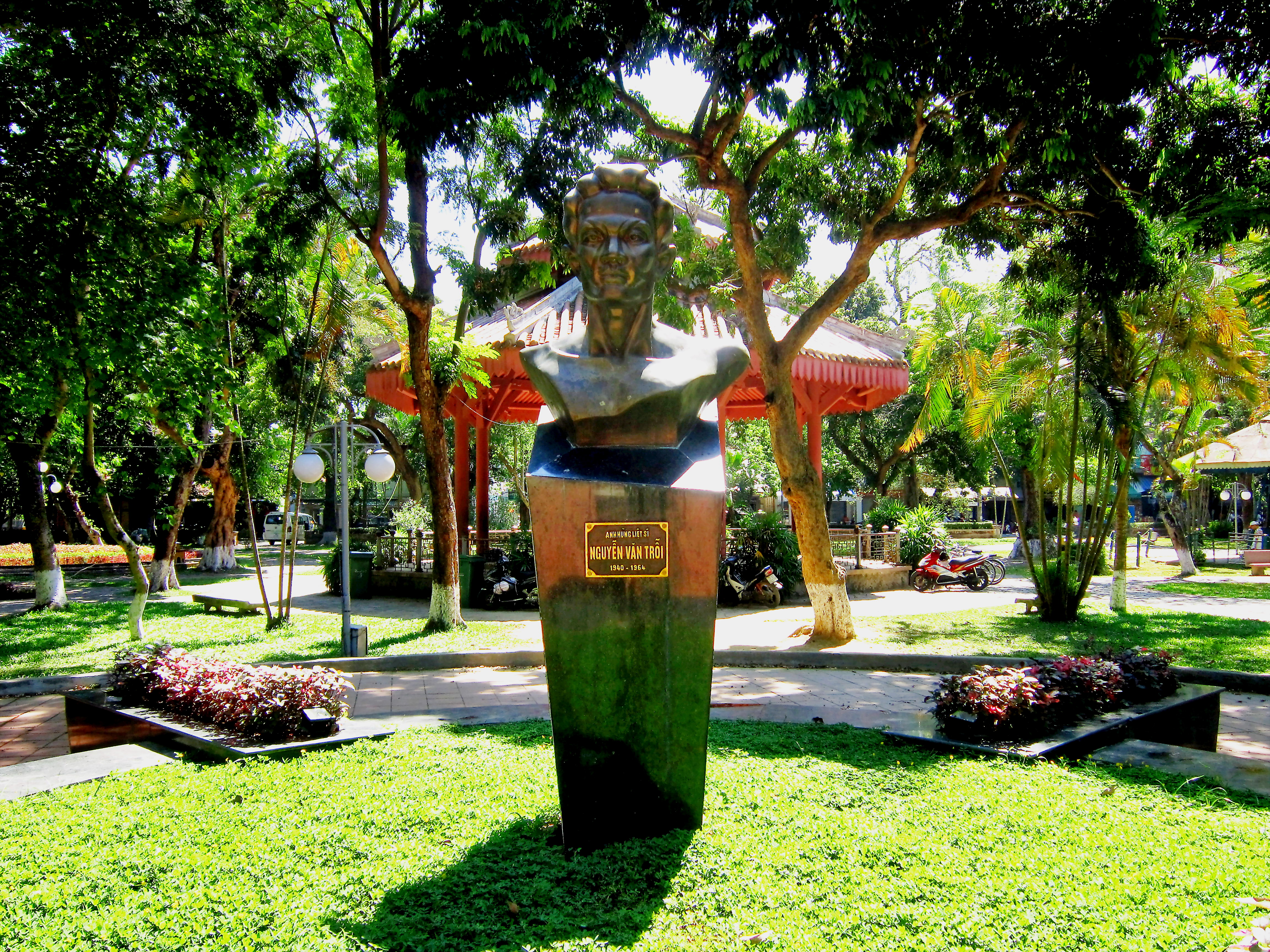
Nguyễn Văn Trỗi park is standing on the old site of office.

In the third year of Gia Long (1804), when building the official system, the position of mandarins who was managing the Royal Family Office was placed above the first rank in official rankings, the two second-ranking positions of the Royal Family Office (left and right Royal Family Office) were both at the first rank. The system was finalised in 1836 under emperor Ming Mạng.

Initially, Tôn Nhơn phủ was only a place to keep records, but later this agency also had the authority to resolve issues related to the imperial members, princes and grandsons in the imperial family. During the French colonial period from 1897, the council was under the direct control of the Resident-Superior of Annam. After the fall of Nguyen dynasty, the council had no any reason to exist, then it was changed the name to clan organization called "Nguyễn Phúc Clan Council" under the direct advice of former empress dowager Từ Cung.

==== Places of Six Ministries of the Nguyễn dynasty ====
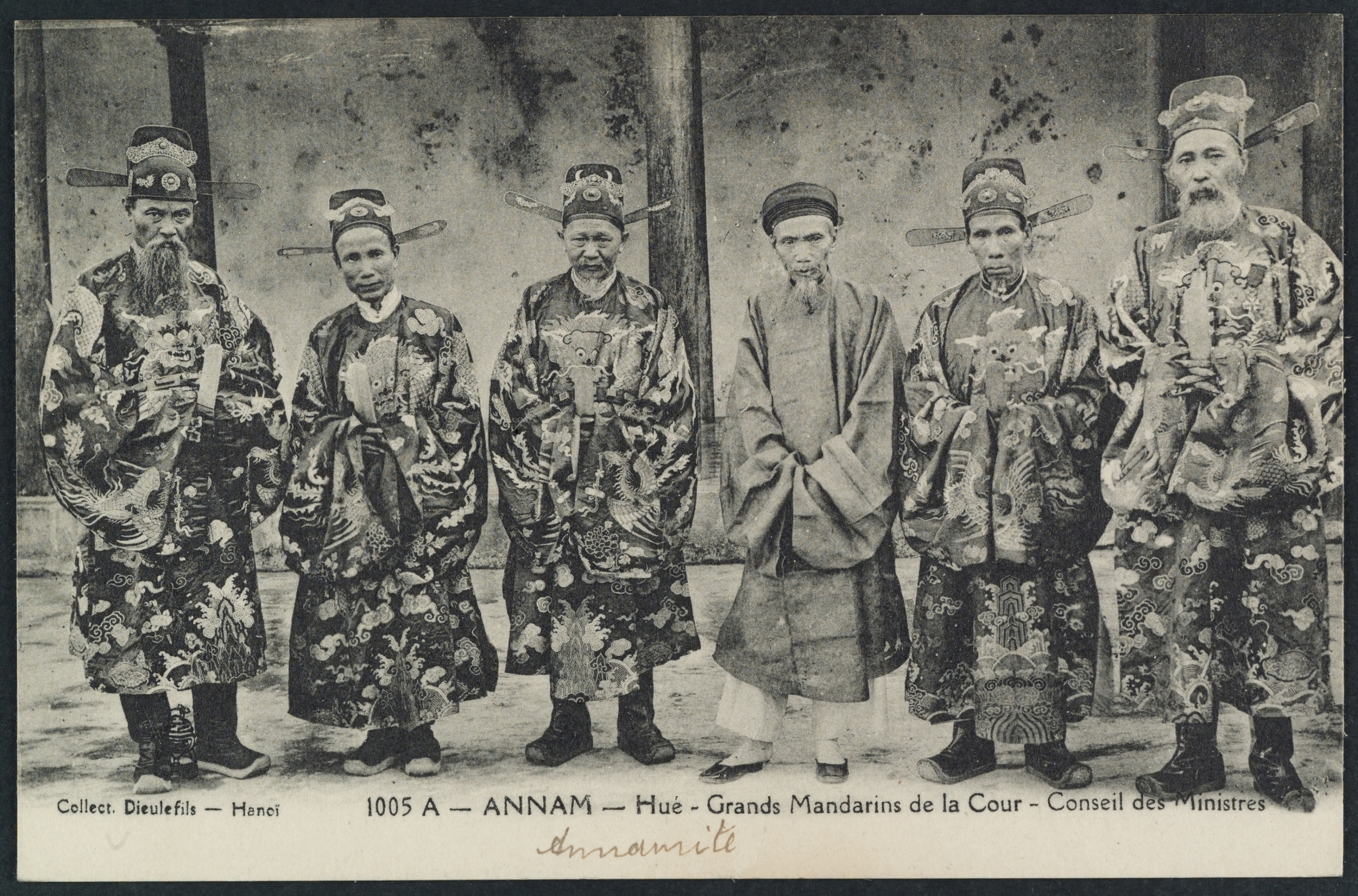
Cabinet ministry of emperor Duy Tan, (From left to right), Minister of laws (Tôn Thất Hân), Minister of administration (Nguyễn Hữu Bài), Minister of rites (Huỳnh Côn), prince Nguyễn Phúc Miên Lịch, Minister of Public Works (Lê Trinh), Minister of Education (Cao Xuân Dục).

Lục Bộ Đường (六部堂) was the 6 offices established under the Emperor Gia Long in 1802 based on the Chinese model of Three Departments and Six Ministries until 1907 with the establishment of the Học Bộ (Ministry of education, 學部). These six core ministries would exist largely unchanged until the 1933 reforms of government by the Emperor Bảo Đại. This area is now ruins

==== Hall of Long An ====
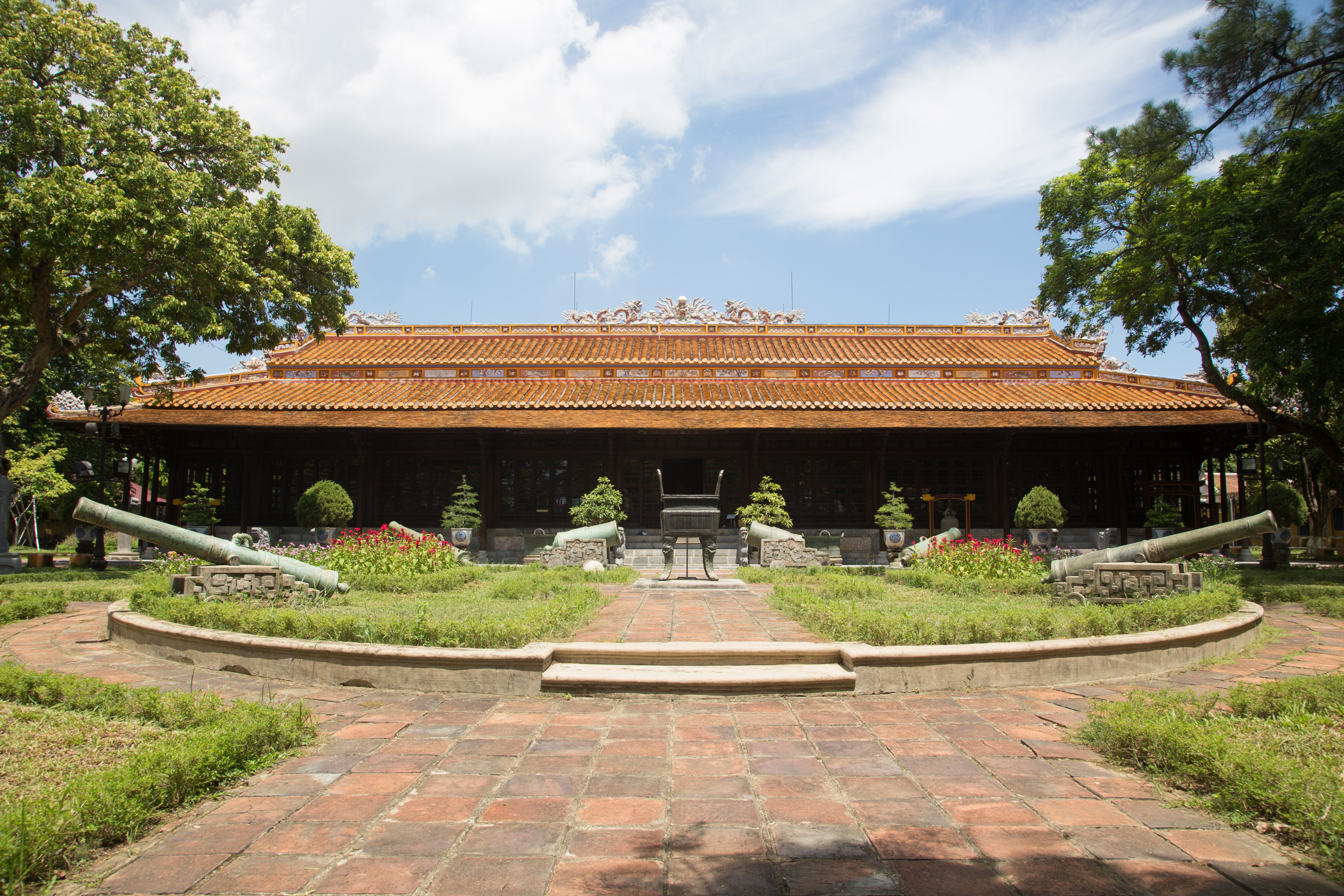
Hall of Long An, now used as Huế Museum of Royal Fine Arts.

Long An Điện (隆安殿) was built in 1845, during the reign of emperor Thiệu Trị as the part of Bao Dinh Palace as a resting place for the emperor after performing the ploughing ceremony (Tịch Điền Lễ, 籍田禮) in every spring. This was also the place where emperor Thiệu Trị often visited, rested, read books and compose poems, etc. After Thiệu Trị died, this was also the place where his body was enshrined for eight months before burial. There was also Thieu Tri's memorial tablet in Long An hall as a place he often visited during his life. During the fall of Huế (1885), the French army invaded the palace, destroying the solemnity of a place of worship. The French army occupied Bao Dinh Palace as a military post and brutally ruined Long An hall. The palace was then demolished and its artifact were put into storage.

In 1909, emperor Duy Tân rebuilt the hall and moved it to current location and used as place to store the documents and archives in Chinese, French, English, etc., mainly used for students of Imperial Academy.

On August 24, 1923, Resident-Superior of Annam and emperor Khai Dinh issued a decree to use Long An hall as Khai Dinh Museum. Currently, Long An Palace is also known as Hue Royal Antiquities Museum, which displays Hue royal antiquities.

==== Imperial Academy, Huế ====
Imperial Academy was the national academy during the Nguyễn dynasty. It was located on the right side of the Imperial City of Huế.

==== Privy council office ====
Privy council (Vietnamese: Cơ mật viện; chữ Hán: 機密院) was established in 1834, was the Privy Council and key mandarin agency of the imperial court of Nguyễn dynasty at Huế until the end of the dynasty in 1945.

==== Tịnh Tâm lake ====
Hồ Tịnh Tâm (Vietnamese: Hồ Tịnh Tâm; chữ Hán: 淨心湖) was an artificial lake built under the Nguyen dynasty. Previously, the lake was the vestige of the Kim Long River flowing through Hue city. At the beginning of the Gia Long, the court renovated some sections of the river and dredged the stream in another direction to form Ngự Hà river and Ký Tế Lake. The two floating areas in this lake were used as warehouses for gunpowder and saltpeter. In the third year of Minh Mang (1822), the emperor mobilized up to 8,000 soldiers to participate in the renovation of the lake. In 1838, emperor Minh Mang moved two warehouses to the east, rebuilt this place into the leisure and entertainment and called it Tinh Tam Lake. Under emperor Thieu Tri, this was considered one of the 20 beautiful landscapes (神京二十景) of the capital. In Khải Định' era, this was a favorite hunting place of emperor.

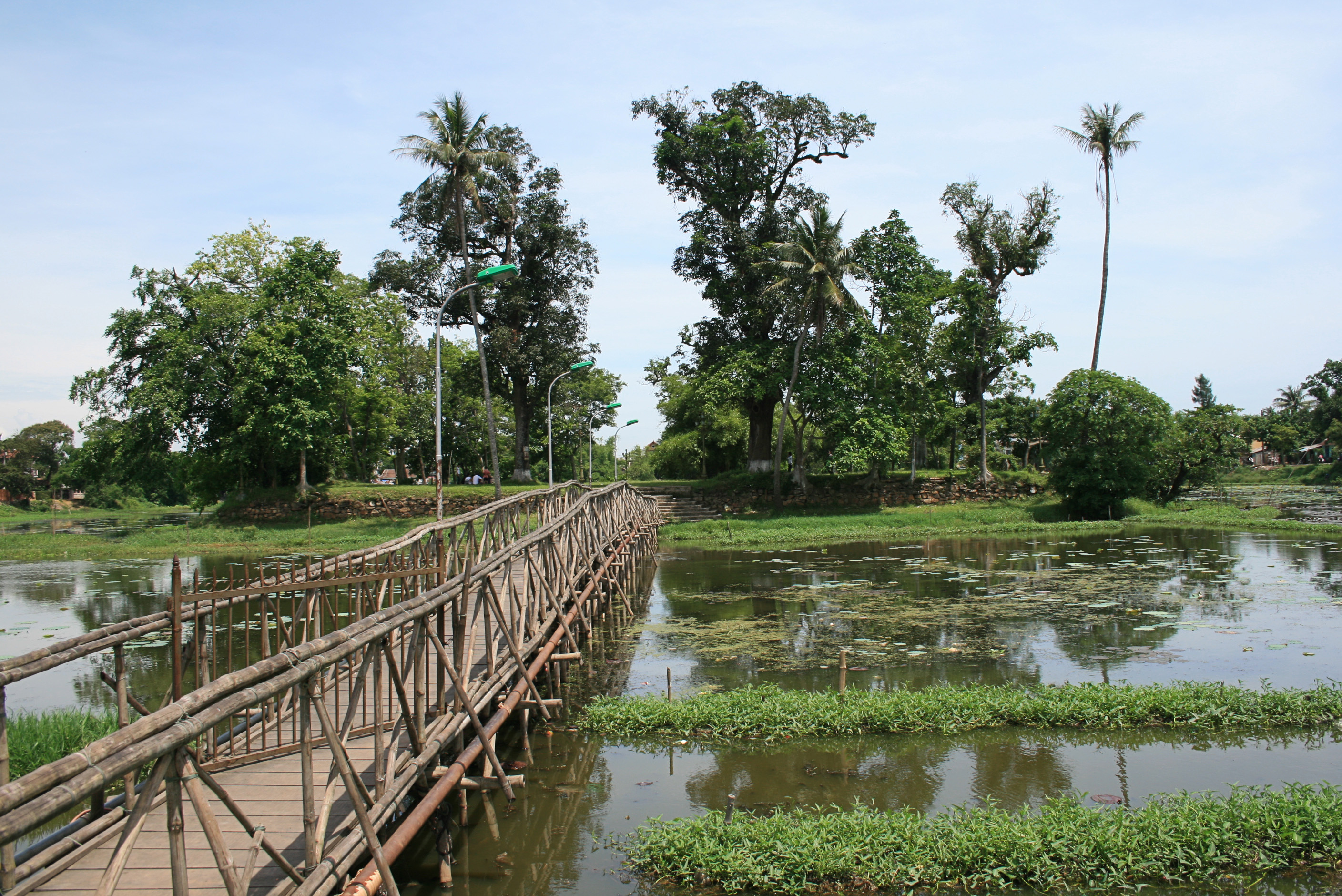
Phương Trượng island in Tịnh Tâm lake

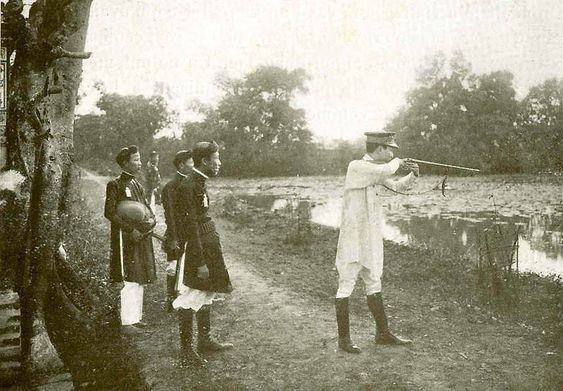
Emperor Khải Định in the hunting trip at here.

==== Imperial library ====
Imperial library (Vietnamese: Tàng Thư Lâu; chữ Hán: 藏書樓) was built in the summer of the 6th year of Minh Mang (1825). Under the royal court's mandate, Commander-in-Chief Đoàn Đức Luân commanded more than 1,000 soldiers to construct the building. The building was built of bricks and stones with 2 floors in which the lower floor had 11 rooms and the upper floor had 7 rooms and 2 wings. It was located on a rectangular island (about 45 m × 65 m in size) in the middle of Học Hải Lake. Học Hải Lake was originally a part of Ngu Ha River, which was renovated to connect with Tinh Tam Lake, creating a system of interconnected rivers and lakes. It was used as a place to store rare documents related to the activities of the court and the changes of the country. The number of document archived from the Gia Long and Minh Mang periods stored here was up to 12,000 units. It was regarded as very important place at that time.

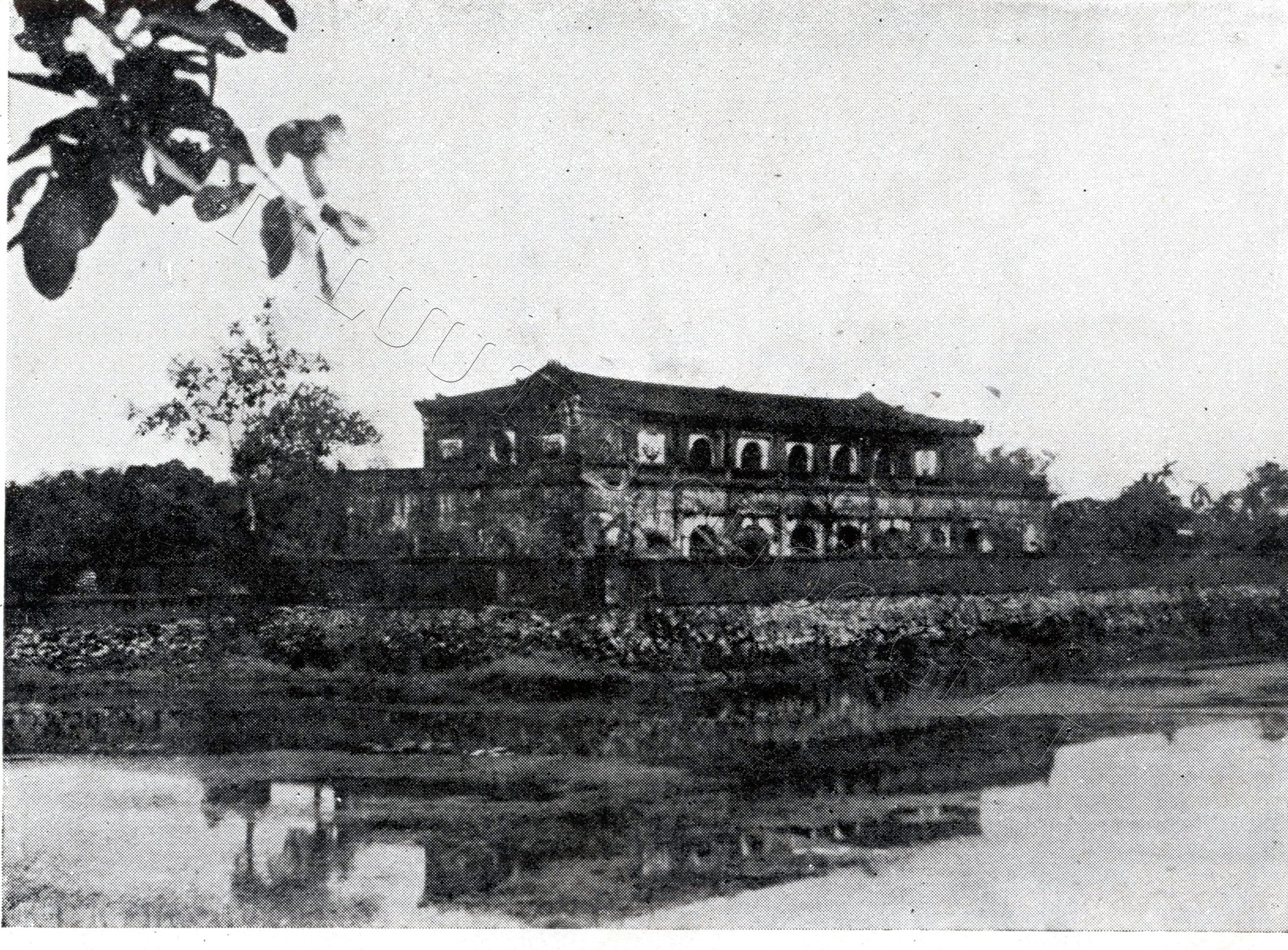
Imperial Library, 1942.

==== Altar of soil and grain ====
Xã Tắc Altar (Vietnamese: Đàn Xã Tắc; chữ Hán: 社稷壇) was the monument built in the citadel where the Nguyen dynasty 's emperors worshipped the god of soil and grain. The altar was built under the reign of emperor Gia Long in April 1806, mobilized all regions in the country to provide with clean soil to build it. Previously, the ceremony was held twice a year in spring and autumn and it was ranked as "great ceremony". Every three years (in the years of Rat, horse, cat, rooster), Emperor himself would perform the ceremony while the high-ranking officials will conduct ceremony in the remaining years. From the reign of Minh Mang, the court organized the worship at the Xa Tac altar twice a year, in the second and eighth lunar months. All 13 Nguyen emperors personally came to preside over the ceremony at the Xa Tac altar.

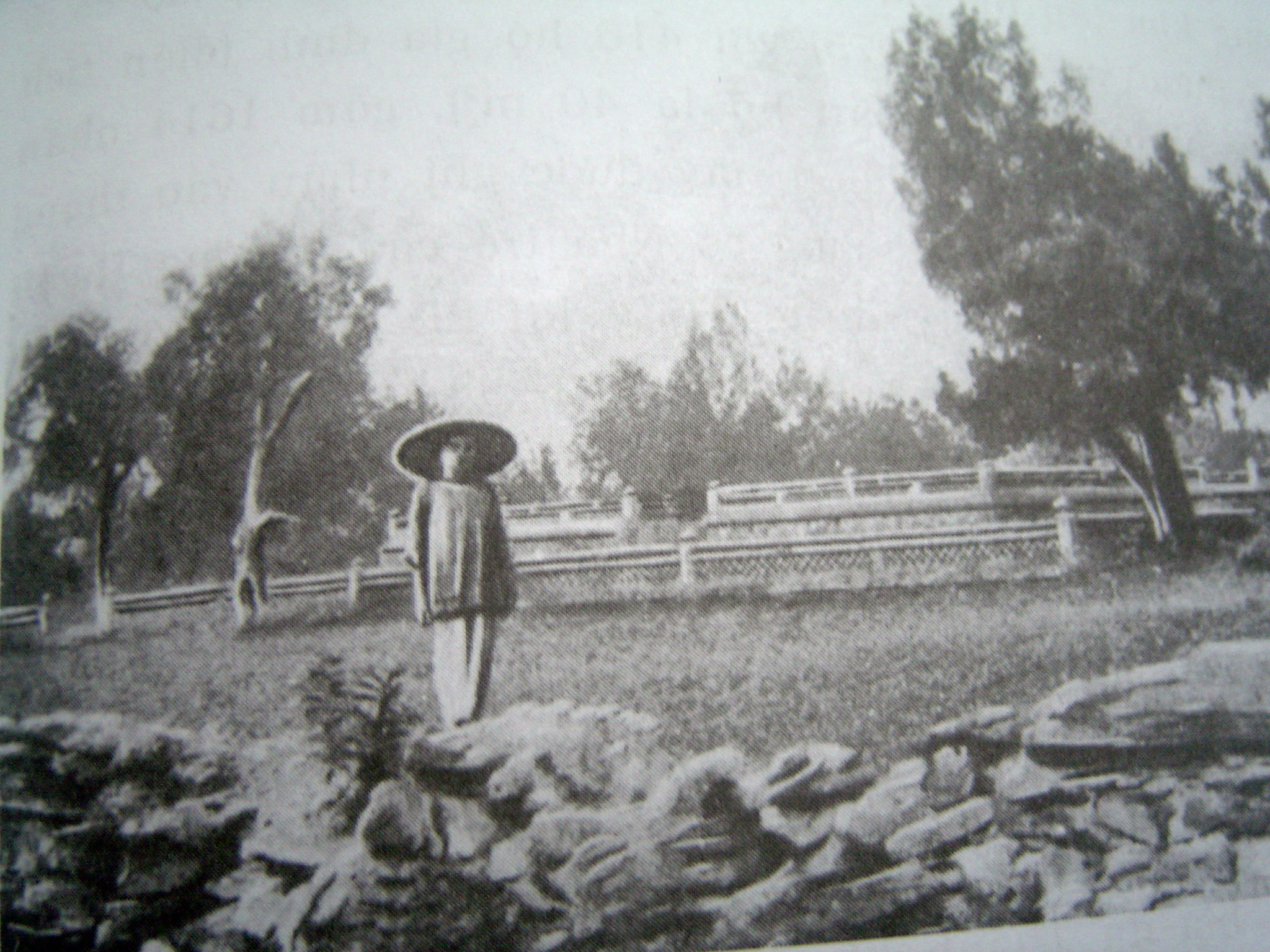
Xã Tắc Altar, 1914

==== Agricultural altar ====
Tiên Nông altar (Vietnamese: Đàn Tiên Nông; chữ Hán: 先農壇) was an altar built during the Minh Mang period (1828) in the northwest of Hue citadel. The altar is where the main ploughing ceremony (Tịch điền, 籍田) took place in which the emperor would personally plow the fields. Ploughing ceremony was one of the most important ceremonies of the royal court in a year. It is not only a special agricultural promotion policy of the state, but also an opportunity for the emperor to understand more about the hardships of farmer works. The ceremony was the encoura The Tiên Nông Altar is now just a ruin covered in the middle of a residential area, but there are still records and images in ancient books.

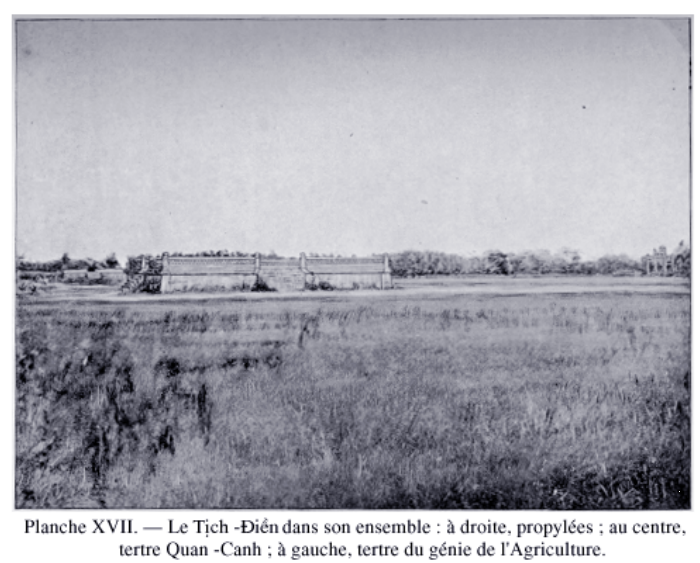
Tiên Nông Altar and surrounding field, 1919.

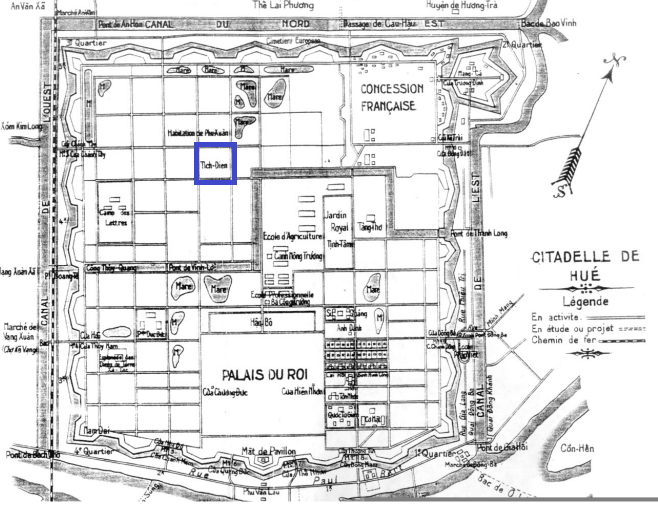
Location of altar inside the citadel.

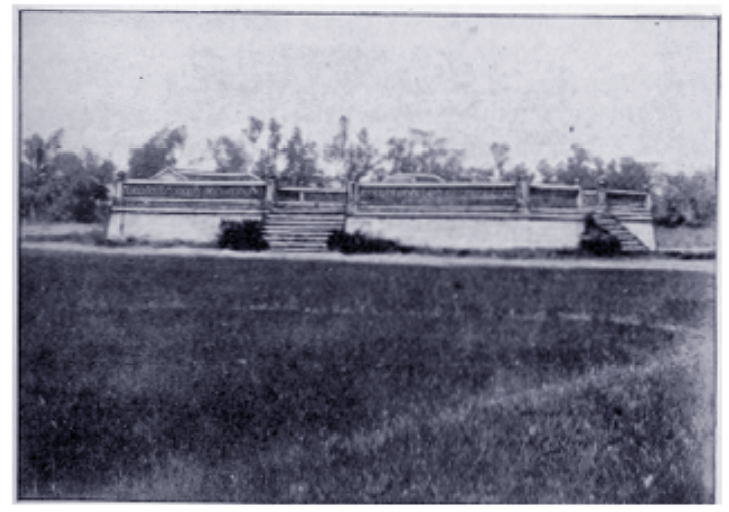
The altar in 1919

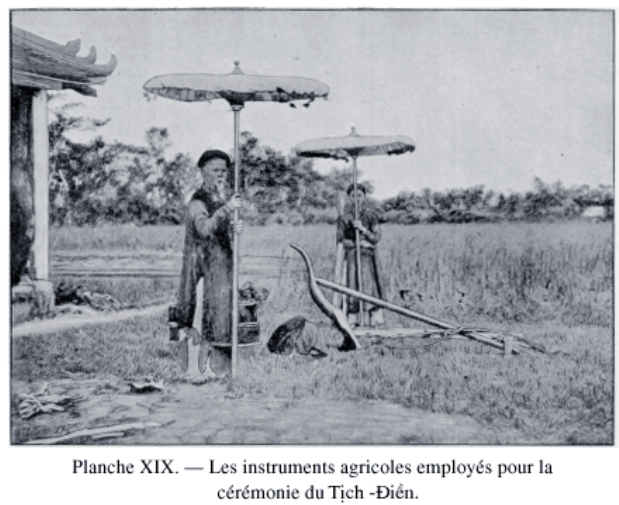
Two people holding umbrella for emperor in ceremony.

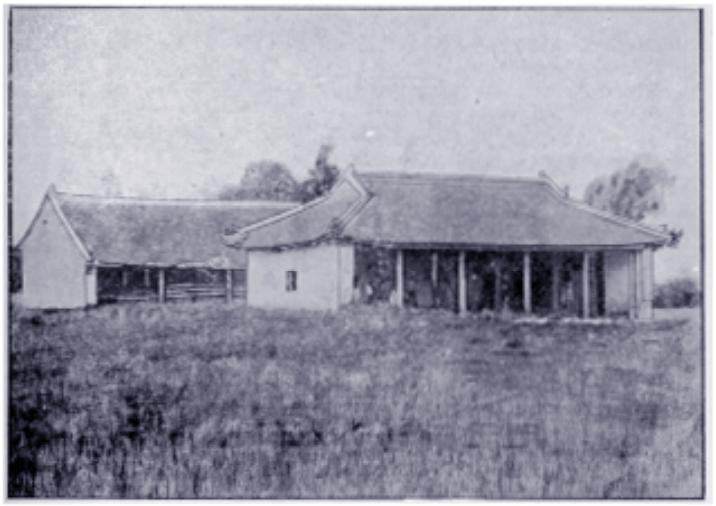
Temple of Thần Thương and Thần Khố

==== Residence of Resident-Superior of Annam ====
Resident-Superior of Annam (French: Résident supérieur de l'Annam; Vietnamese: Khâm sứ Trung Kỳ; chữ Hán: 欽使中圻) was established on 8 April 1886 as a successor to the Resident-General of Annam and Tonkin (résident général de l'Annam et du Tonkin) when it was decided to have one French resident for the French protectorate of Annam and a separate one for Tonkin. Construction began in the summer of April 1876 (Tu Duc 28), and was completed in July 1878. After construction and the establishment of the governing apparatus, the Central Region Resident's Palace became the capital of the French colonial regime in Central Vietnam, controlling all activities of the Nguyen dynasty feudal state.

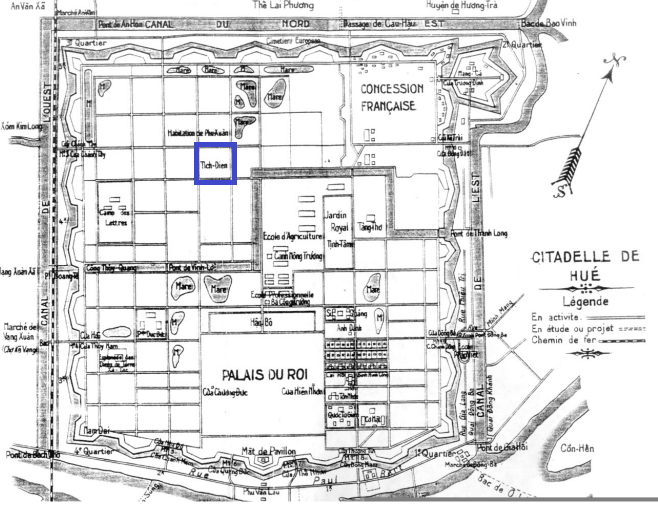
Location of Resident-Superior of Annam (Concession Française) at the top right of citadel.

In April 1908, a protest demanding tax reduction by the people of Thua Thien Hue took place here. The headquarters now is the Hue University of Education.

== Imperial palace ==
The Imperial palace (Vietnamese: Hoàng thành; chữ Hán: 皇城) is the second wall inside the citadel played the function of protecting the most important palace of the imperial court, the temples of the Nguyen dynasty's ancestors and protecting the Forbidden Purple City (private residence of emperor and empress consort). The Imperial palace and the Forbidden Purple City are often referred to as the great inner palace (Vietnamese: Đại Nội; chữ Hán: 大內). The Imperial Citadel has a square shap with each sides about 600 meters long. It was built of bricks, 4 meters high, 1 meter thick, surrounded by a protective moat, with 4 entrances: the main gate (South) is Ngọ Môn, Hiển Nhơn gate in the east, Chương Đức gate in the West and Hòa Bình gate in the North. Moat was dug around the outside of the palace was named Kim Thủy (金水). The Imperial Citadel and the entire palace system inside are arranged on a symmetrical axis, in which the buildings lie on the central axis is reserved for emperor. The building on both sides are strictly distributed according to each area.

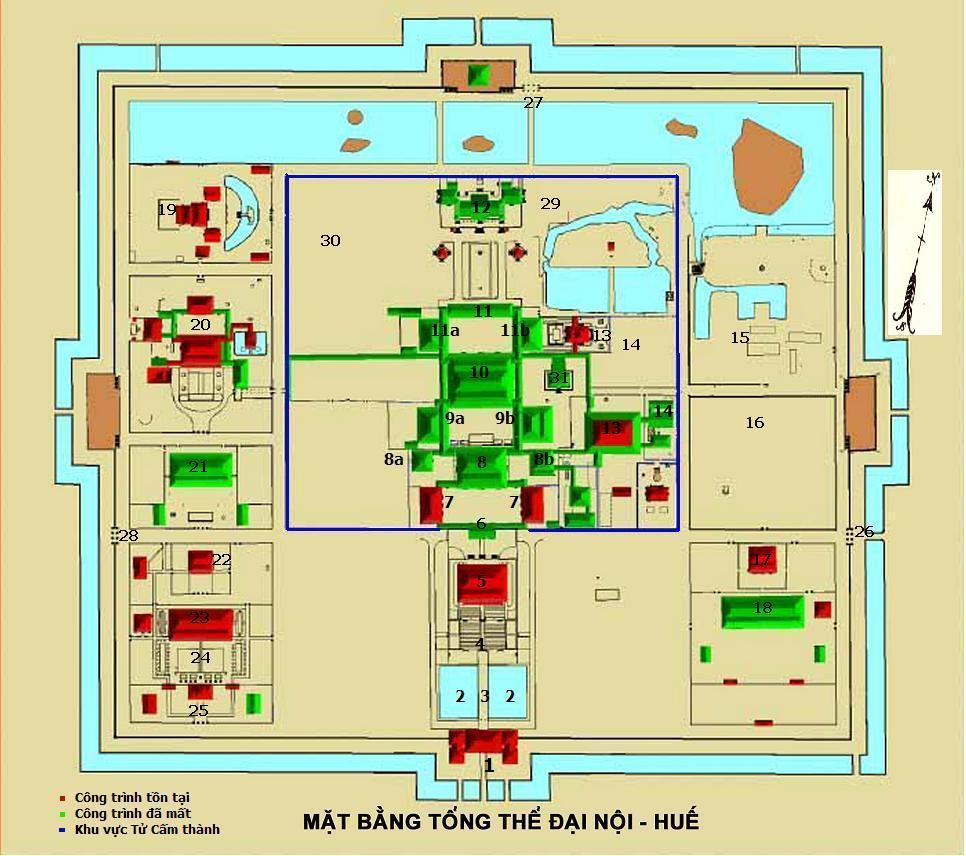
Map of Imperial Palace and the Purple Forbidden City (blue square).
1. Ngọ Môn; 2. Thái Dịch lake; 3. Trung Đạo bridge; 4. Đại Triều Nghi Courtyard; 5. Thái Hoà Điện; 6. Đại Cung Môn gate; 7. Tả Vu, Hữu Vu; 8. Cần Chánh Điện; 8a. Võ Hiển Điện; 8b. Văn Minh Điện; 9a. Trinh Minh Điện; 9b. Quang Minh Điện; 10. Càn thành Điện; 11. Khôn Thái Cung; 11a. Thuận Huy Viện; 11b. Dưỡng Tâm Viện; 12. Kiến Trung Điện; 13(upper). Thái Bình Lâu; 13(lower). Duyệt Thị đường; 14. Thiệu Phương garden; 14(green). Kitchen; 15. Cơ Hạ garden; 16. Imperial storage; 17. Triệu Miếu; 18. Thái Miếu; 19. Trường Sanh Cung; 20. Diên Thọ Cung; 21. Phụng Tiên Điện; 22. Hưng Miếu; 23. Thế Miếu; 24. Cửu Đỉnh; 25. Hiển Lâm Các; 26. Hiển Nhơn Môn; 27. Hoà Bình Môn; 28. Chương Đức Môn; 29. Ngự Tiền Văn phòng; 30. Lục Viện; 31. Nhật Thành Lâu.

=== Four gates of the Imperial palace ===
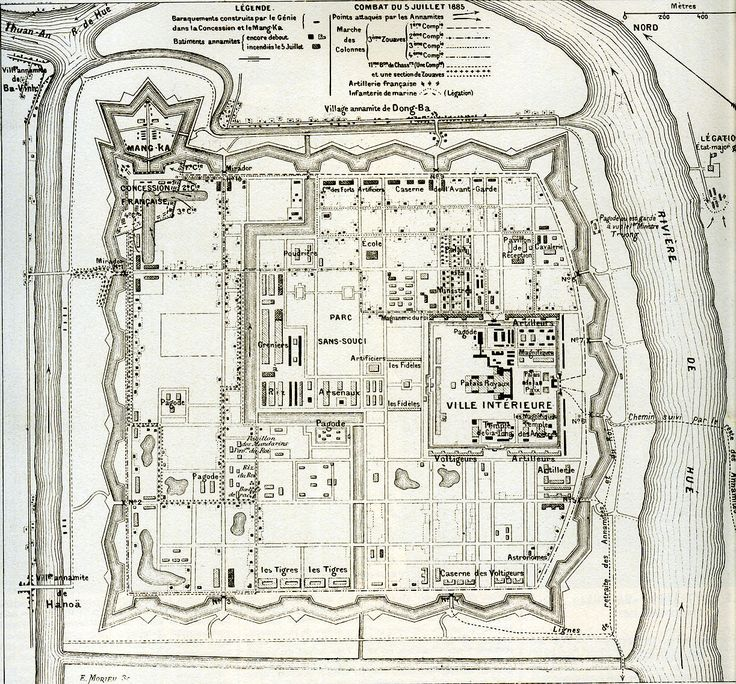
Map of Hue citadel (Kinh Thành, 京城) in 1885 during the French occupation. The imperial palace (Hoàng Thành,皇城) is the square-shape labeled as VILLE INTERIEURE.

+ South gate (Vietnamese: Ngọ Môn; chữ Hán: 午門) The largest and main gate of the palace used by the emperor. The emperor will use middle gate while mandarins shall use the others to enter the palace.

+ North gate (Vietnamese: Hòa Bình Môn; chữ Hán: 和平門) Hòa Bình Môn in the north was mainly used by court ladies and eunuchs.

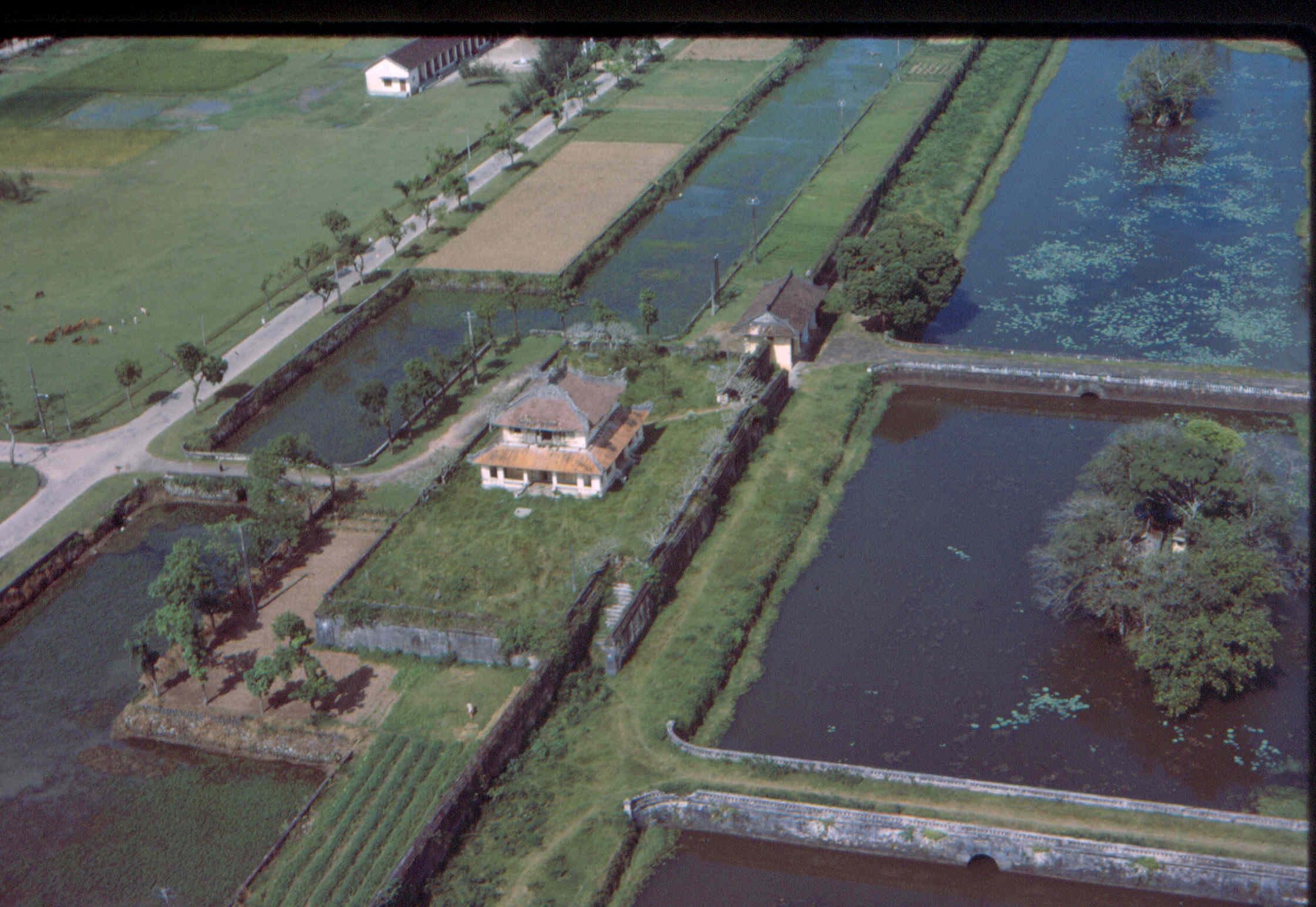
Hòa Bình Môn (right) next to Tứ Phương Vô Sự pavilion.

+ West gate (Vietnamese: Chương Đức Môn; chữ Hán: 彰德門)

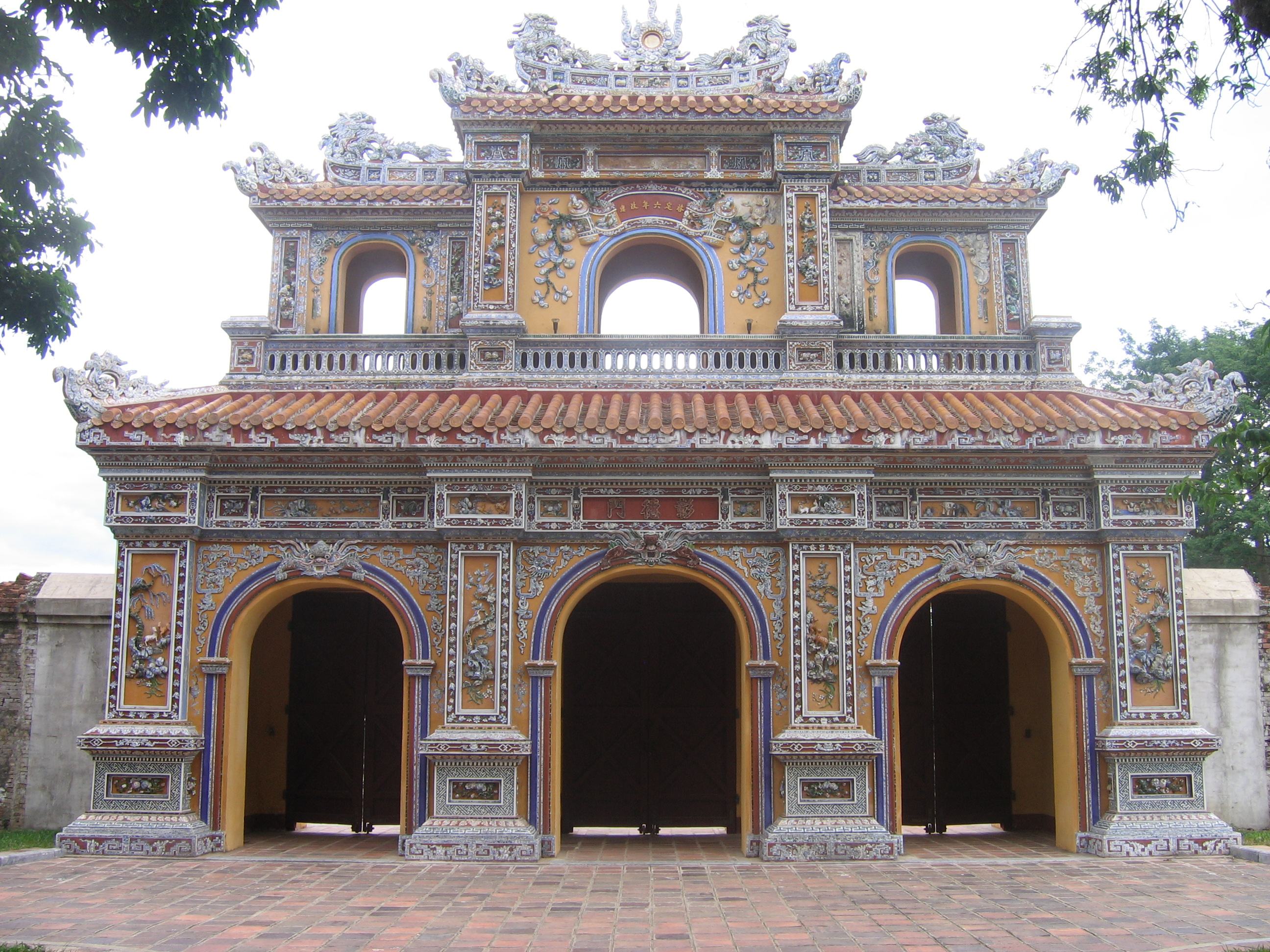
Gate of Chương Đức- Chương Đức Môn (彰德門) Western gate of imperial palace, only used by women.

+ East gate (Vietnamese: Hiển Nhơn Môn; chữ Hán: 顯仁門)

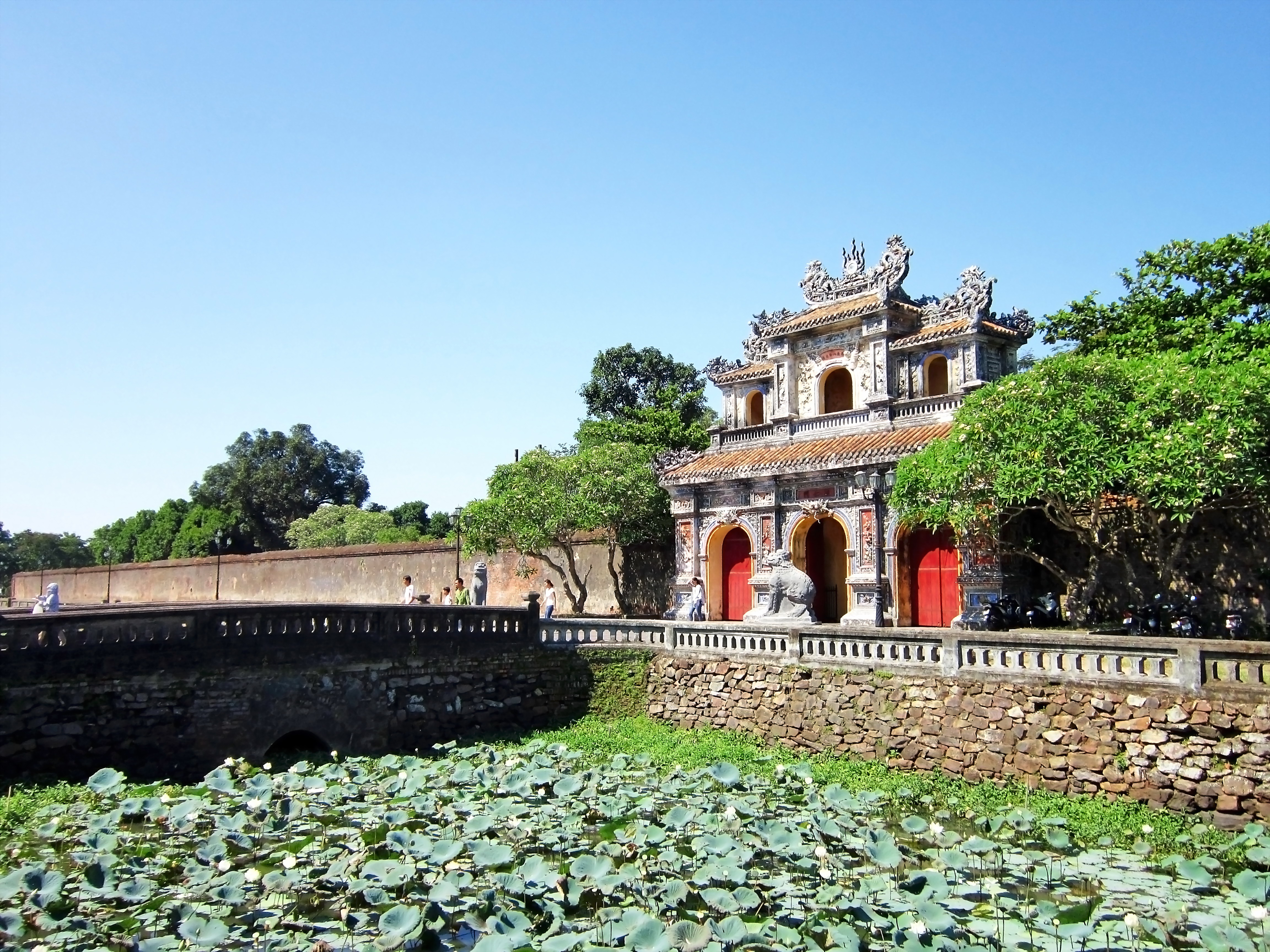
The Eastern Gate which were allowed only for men, women were restricted from enter this gate.

=== Four keep towers of the Imperial palace ===
There are 4 main keep towers located in the middle of each walls of palace named (Vietnamese: Khuyết đài; chữ Hán:闕臺): they were built early in Gia Long's reign and used as both observation decks and for defence, each tower has a square building built with flat tile roof.

+ Southern keep (Nam Khuyết Đài, 南闕臺): Nam Khuyết Đài was built in 1804 with two gates on both sides, "Tả Đoan Môn" (左端門) and "Hữu Đoan Môn" (右端門). On the top was the main building named Càn Nguyên Điện (乾元殿) as observation deck, In the 14th year of Minh Mang (1833), the emperor started to reorganize the entire architectural layout of the Imperial palace, Nam Khuyết Đài was completely demolished to make room for the construction of Meridian Gate.

+ Western keep (Tây Khuyết đài, 西闕臺): Tây Khuyết đài was built in 1804 next to Chương Đức Môn (West gate), the main building was destroyed in war and fully rebuilt in 2012

+ Eastern keep (Đông Khuyết Đài, 東闕臺): Đông Khuyết đài was built in 1804 next to Hiển Nhơn Môn (East gate). In the 10th year of Minh Mang (1830), on the occasion of his 40th birthday, the emperor renovated Đông Khuyết Đài and painted in gold. It was renovated again in 1839. After war and harsh weather, the structure gradually deteriorated, fell into disrepair and was abandoned. In 2011, the Hue Monuments Conservation Center conducted a preliminary archaeological survey of the foundation of Đông Khuyết Đài. In early 2013, the project began to be restored and completed in November 2023 with a total investment of 11 billion VND.

+ Northern keep (Bắc Khuyết Đài, 北闕臺): Bắc Khuyết đài was built in 1804 next to Hòa Bình Môn (North gate) and rebuilt and renovated in the 40th birthday of emperor Khải Định in 1923.in his birthday, the new building was built on top as Tứ Phương Vô Sự pavilion (Tứ Phương Vô Sự Lâu, 四方無事樓). Before the Tứ Phương Vô Sự pavilion was built, at the current location of the pavilion there was a building house named Tu Thong, built in 1804 under emperor Gia Long with the function of being a guard post for the Imperial Guards on duty, protecting the Imperial City. This building was repaired in 1830, 1833 under emperor Minh Mang and then demolished under emperor Dong Khanh because of its deterioration. In 1923, one year before the birthday ceremony, emperor Khải Định ordered the construction of Tứ Phương Vô Sự pavilion and finished in the same year. Now, it was used as coffee shop inside the palace.

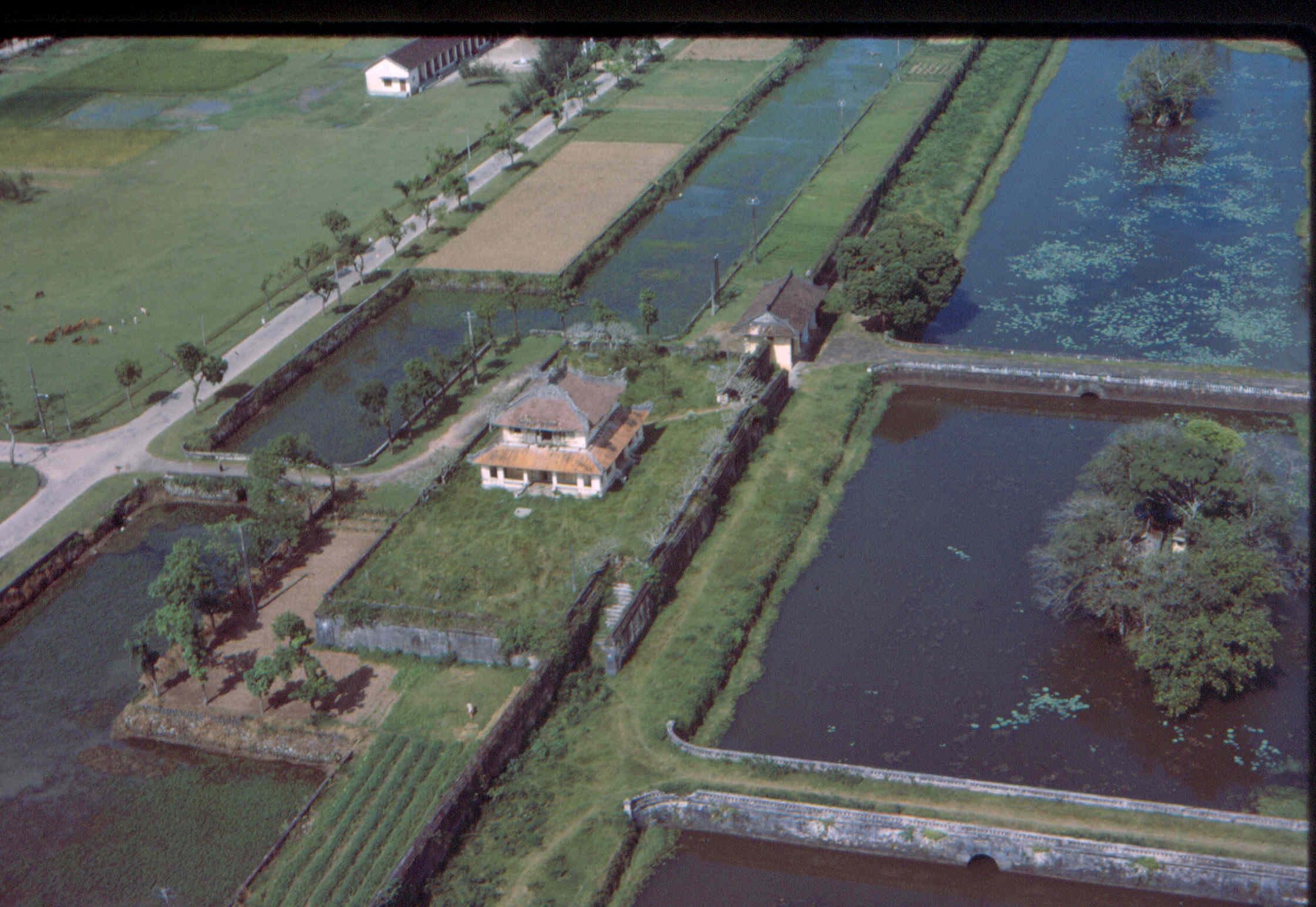
Bird-eye view of Bắc Khuyết Đài, the pavilion (left) and Hòa Bình gate (right).

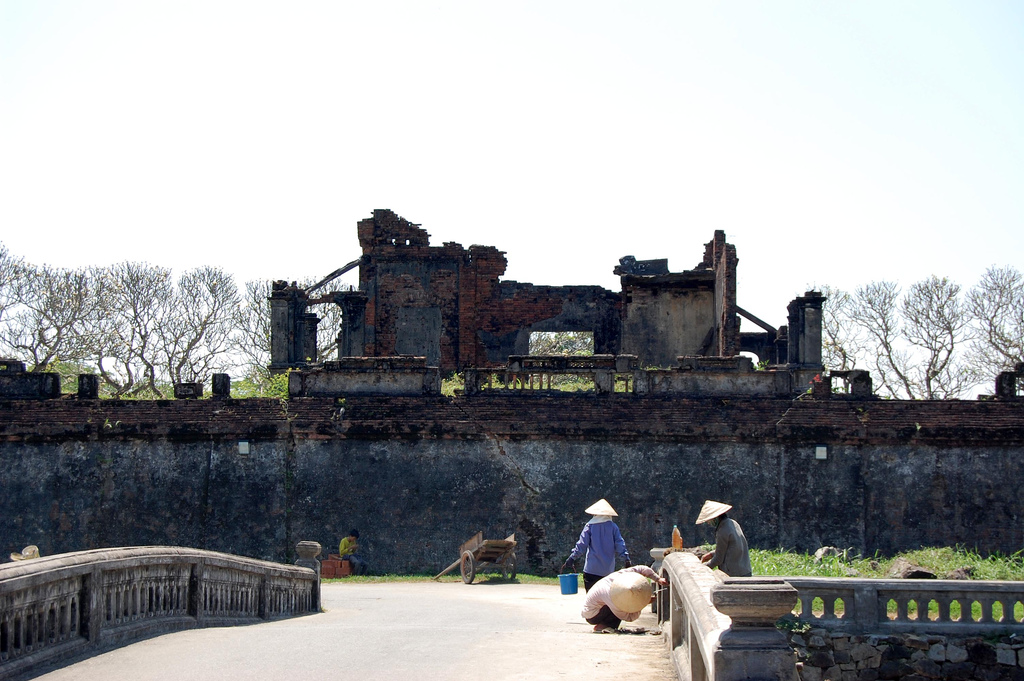
Ruin of the pavilion, destroyed in 1968 during the Tet Offensive.

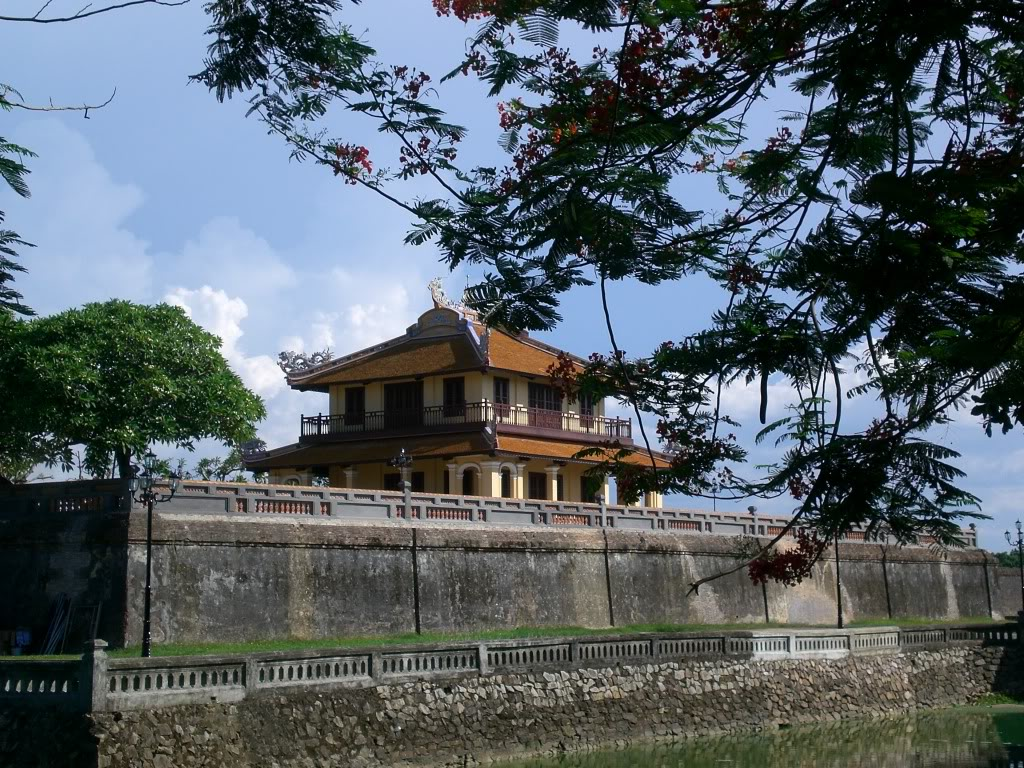
Restored pavilion on the top of Bắc Khuyết Đài in 2010.

== Outer Court (Ngoại Triều, 外朝) ==
=== Thái Hòa Điện (太和殿, Hall of Thái Hòa, Throne hall) ===
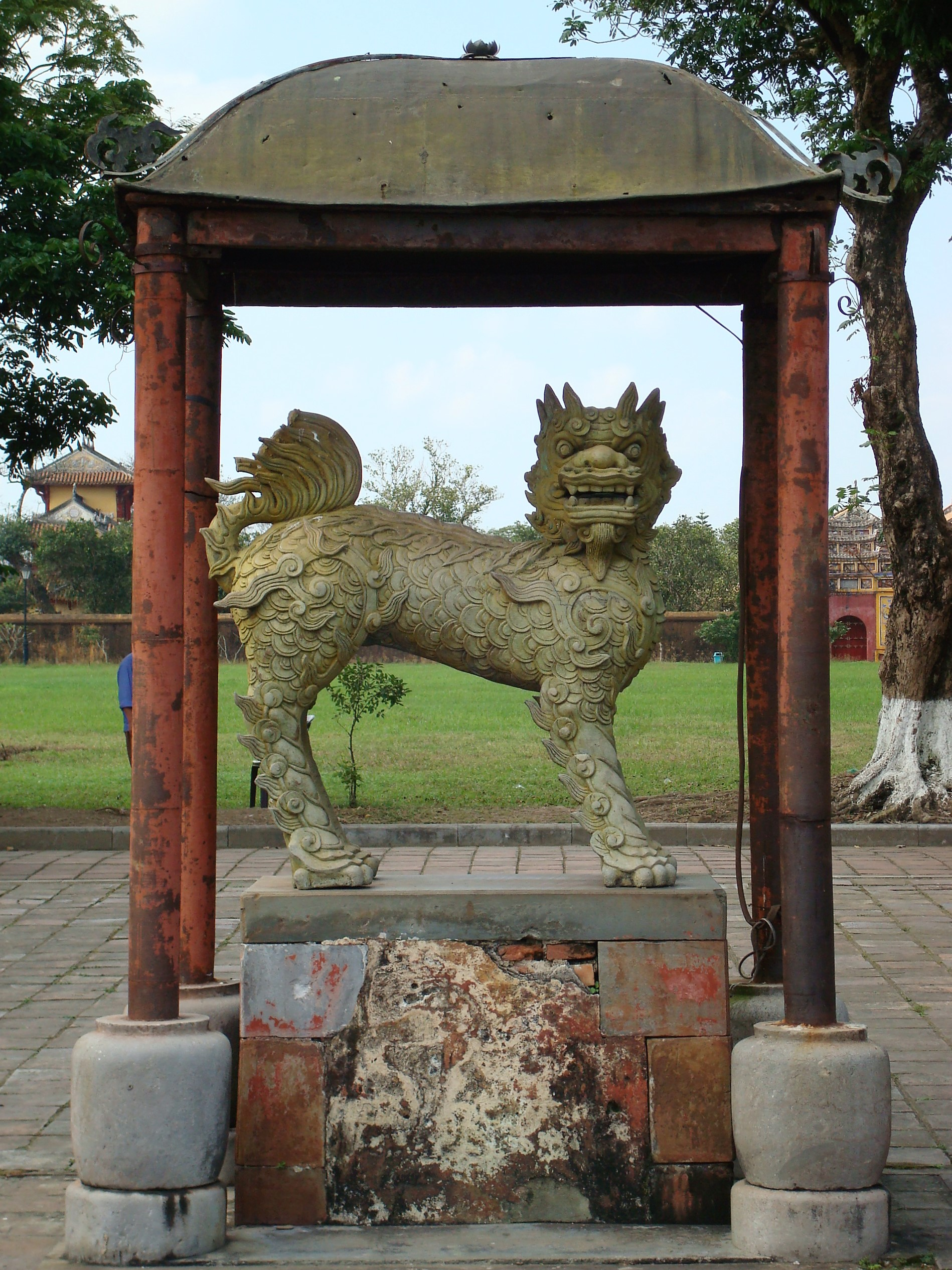
A Nghê statue in front of the hall.

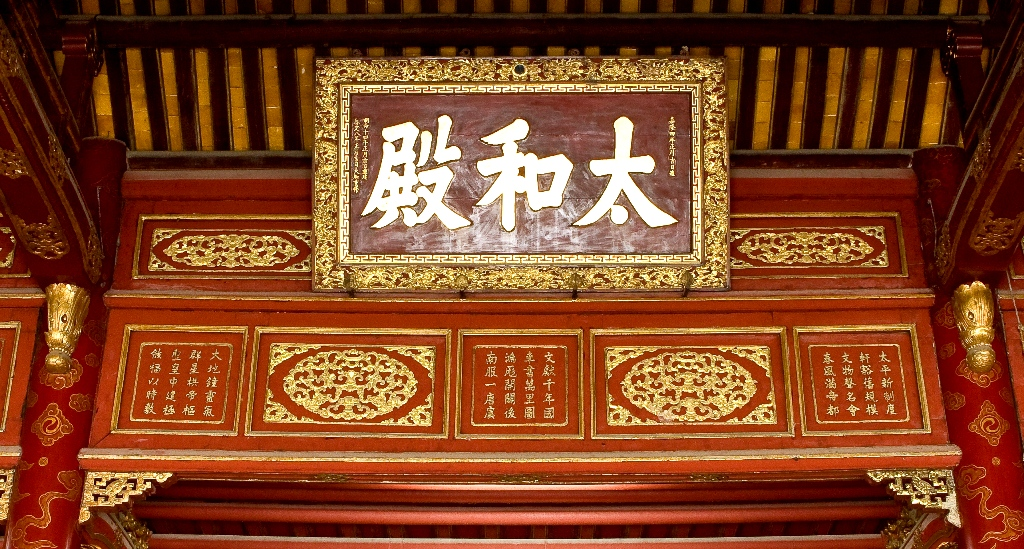
Wooden sign with Chữ Hán characters from right to left "太和殿". Beneath the board is cloisonné enamel panel decorated in style "one poem, one painting" (Nhất Thi Nhất Họa, 一詩一畫).

The building was built in 21/2/1805 and finished in October of the same year on the ground of Can Chanh hall. Then, it was rebuilt in 1833 and moved to the current location. This is the most important ceremonial building in imperial palace and used for some special ceremony such as enthronement, Emperor's birthday, foreign diplomacy meeting and court meeting twice in 1st and 15th day of each month in lunar calendar. The building was built by traditional Vietnamese style "Trùng thiềm điệp ốc" (重簷叠屋) and the interior was decorated by the panel (Cloisonné) inlay into divided match strip with arts and 197 poems called "Nhất Thi Nhất Họa" (一詩一畫) which means "one poem, one painting". The inscribed arts and poems on plaques was gilded including the canopy on top of the throne. Erythrophleum fordii timbers was the primary material for the building. All 13 Emperors of Nguyễn dynasty from Gia Long to Bảo Đại had coronation ceremony at this hall.

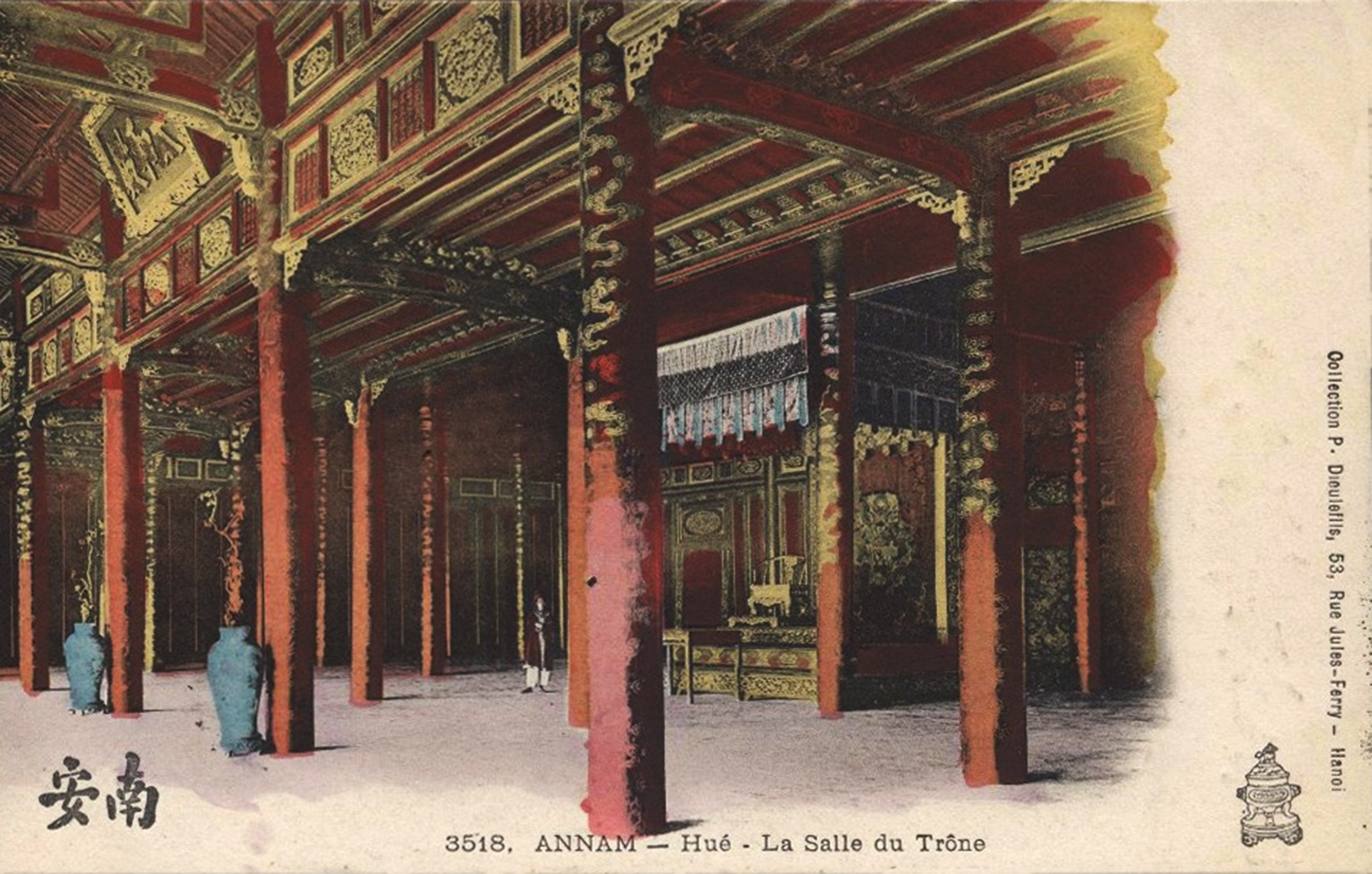
Throne Hall in early 1900s.

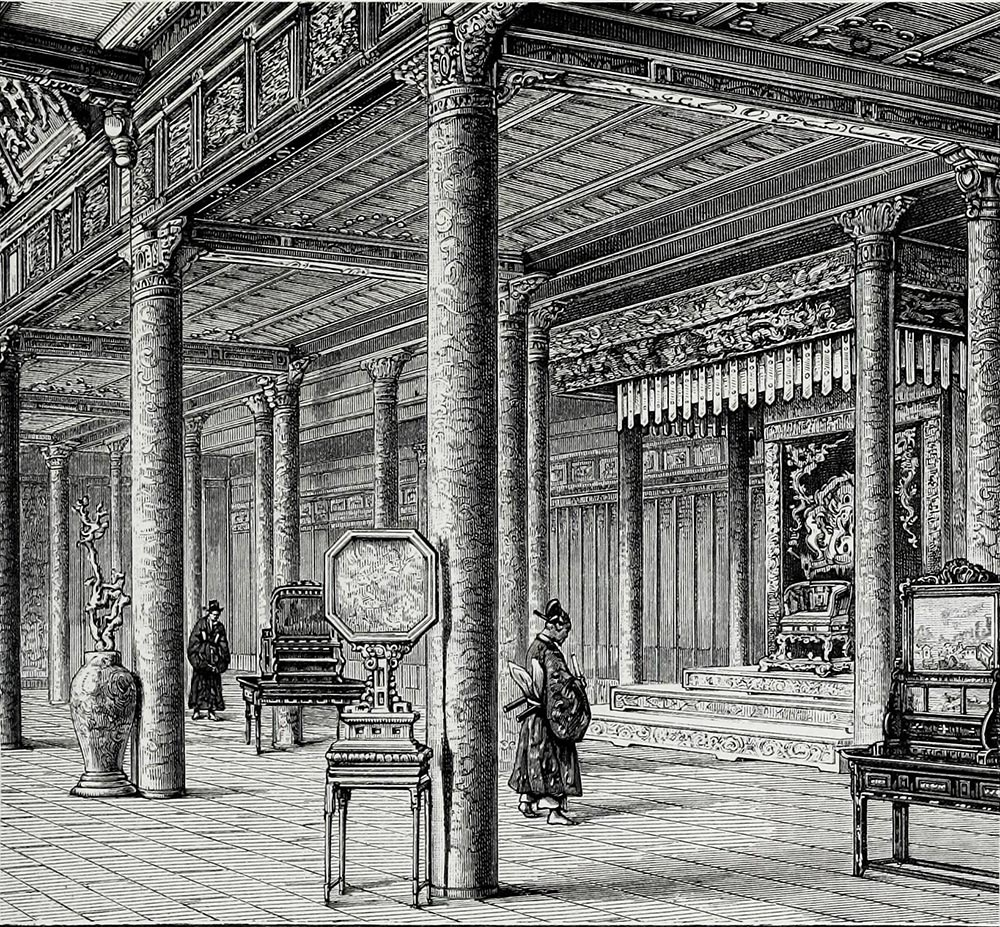
Inside of Thái Hòa hall (太和殿) before 1923

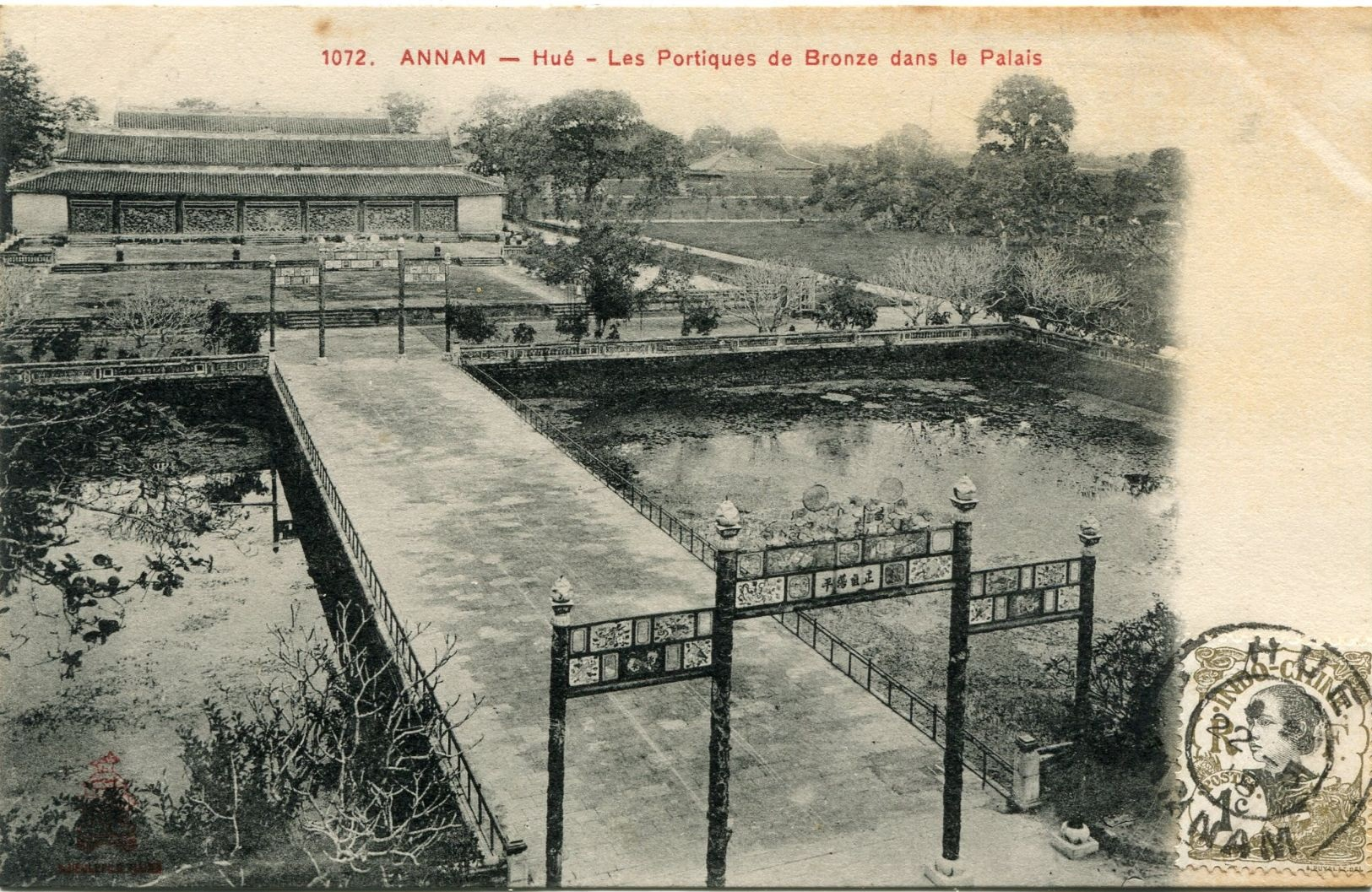
Thái Hòa throne hall, early 1900s.

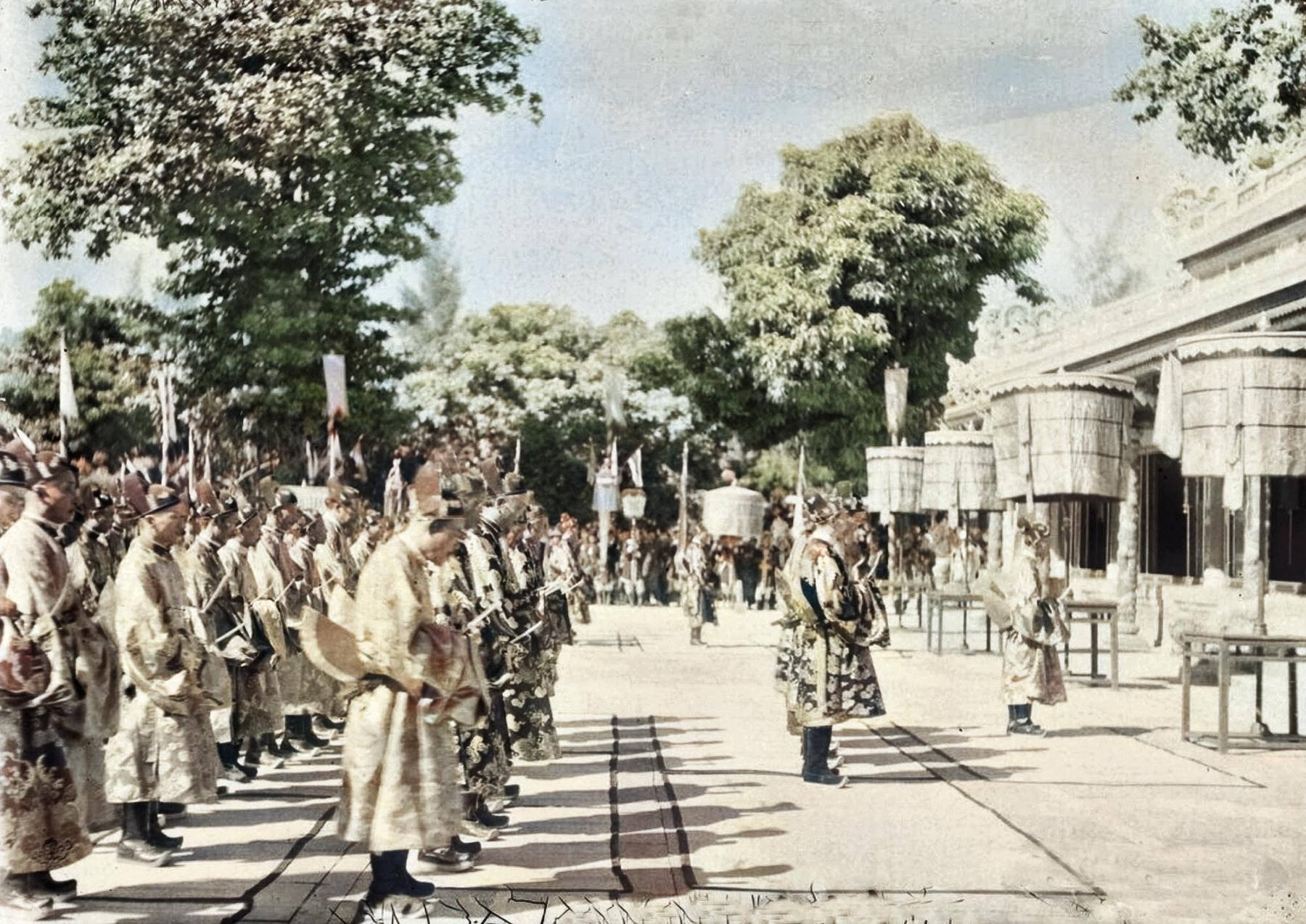
Court officials in ceremony in front of Thái Hòa throne hall during the 40th birthday anniversary of emperor Khải Định, September 9, 1924.

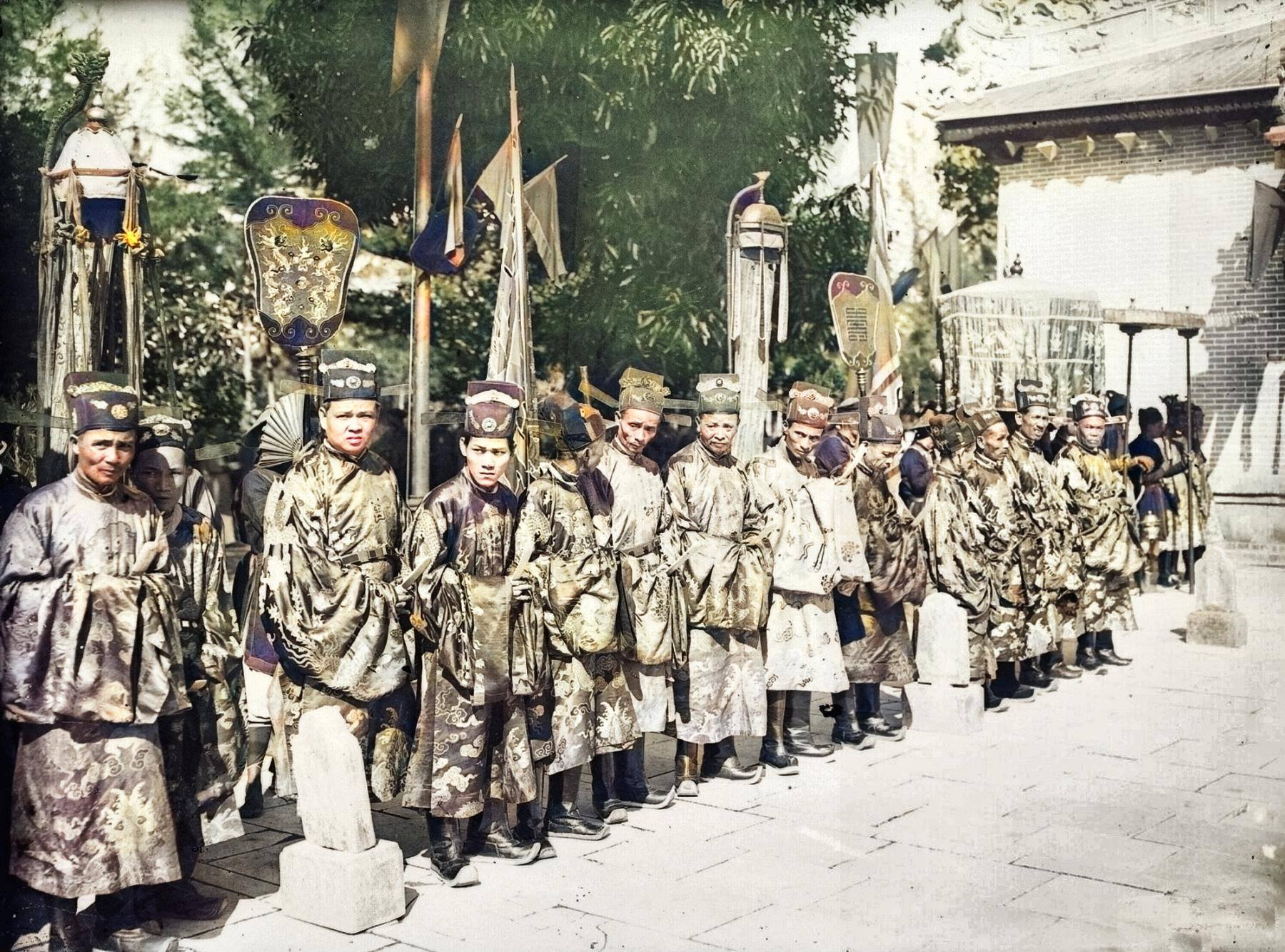
Court officials in ceremony in front of Thái Hòa throne hall during the 40th birthday anniversary of emperor Khải Định.

== Empress dowager's palaces ==
=== Trường Sanh Cung (長生宮, Trường Sanh palace) ===
The palace's original role was a royal garden, where the Nguyen dynasty Emperors invited their mothers to visit and enjoy the scenery. During the reign of emperor Tự Đức, the palace was converted into living palace for several of Empress dowager and Emperor's grandmothers. It was built in 1821 with original name Trường Ninh palace (長寧宮). It gained the current name in 1923.

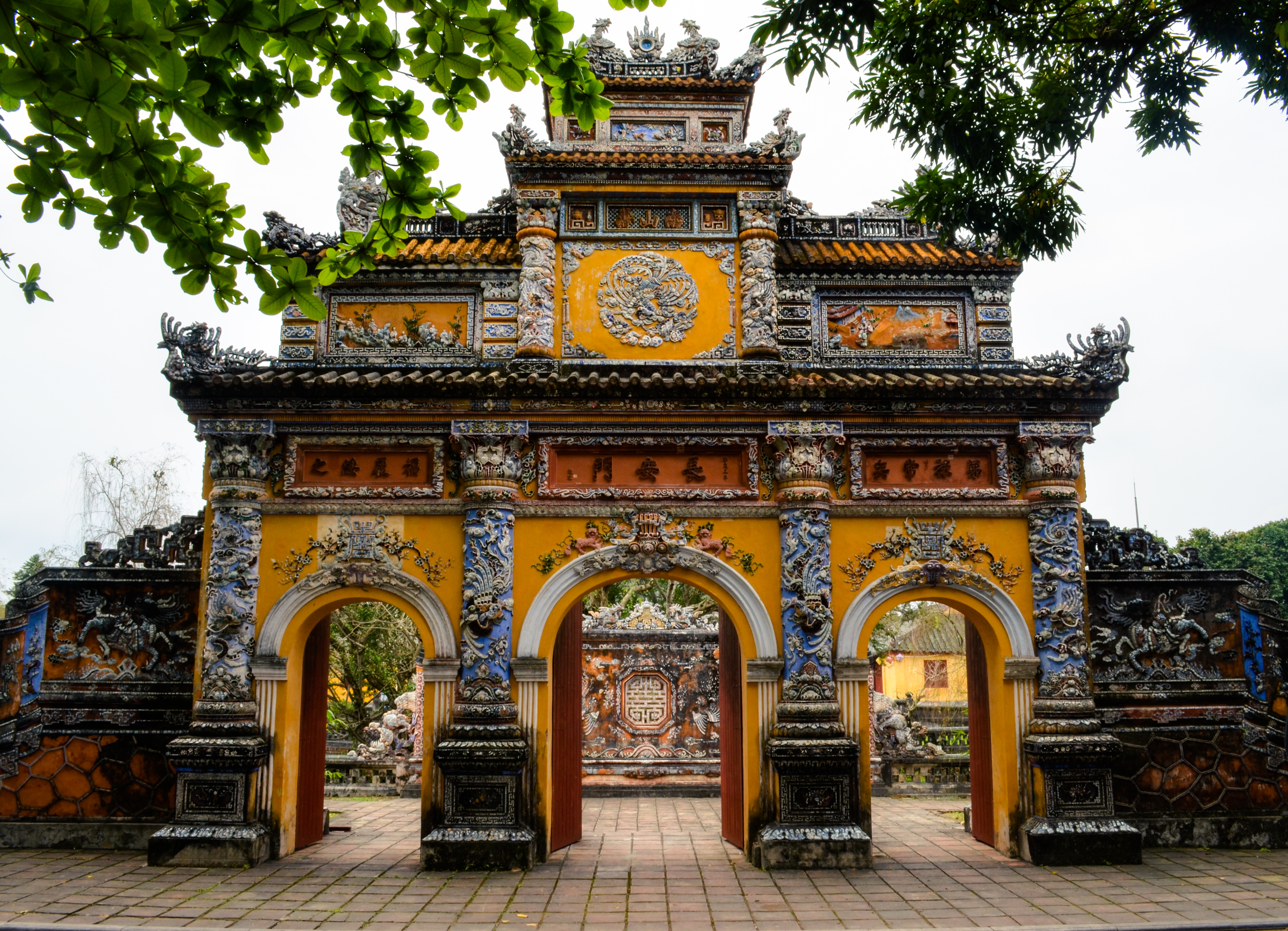
Trường An môn (長安門), Main gate to Trường Sanh palace

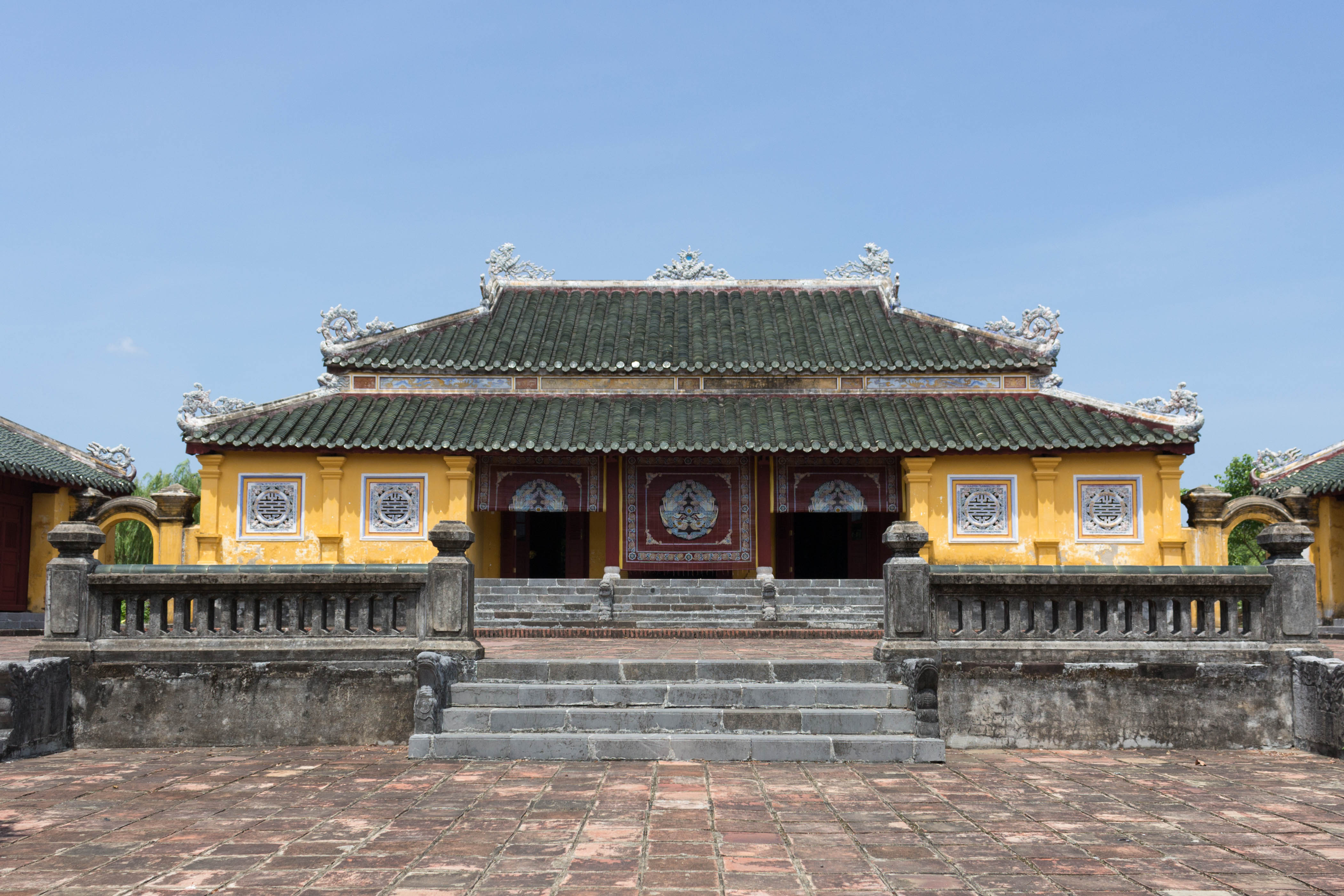
Trường Sanh palace's main hall (Chính điện, 正殿)

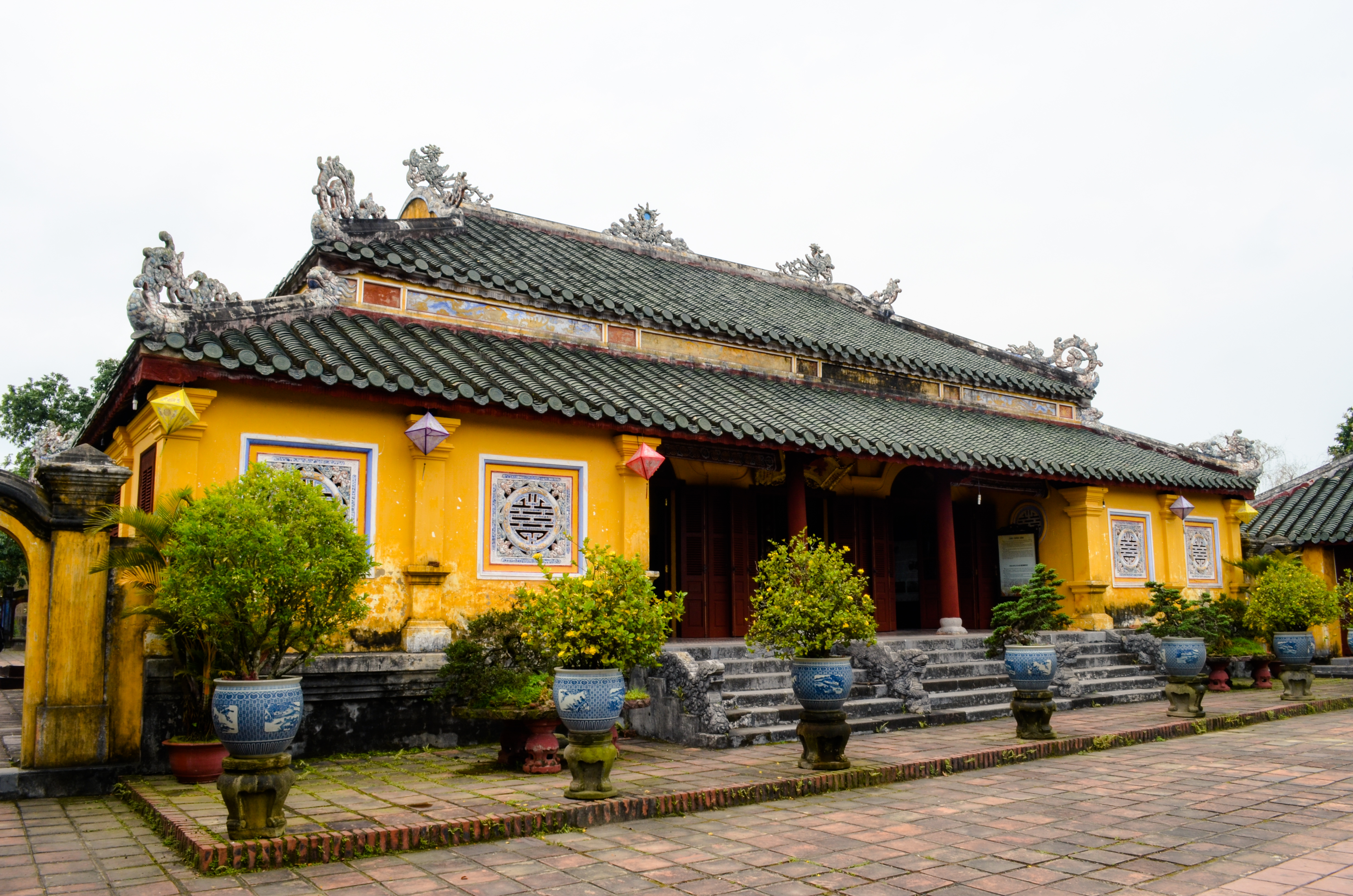
Ngũ Đại Đồng đường (五代同堂)- Hall of Ngũ Đại Đồng

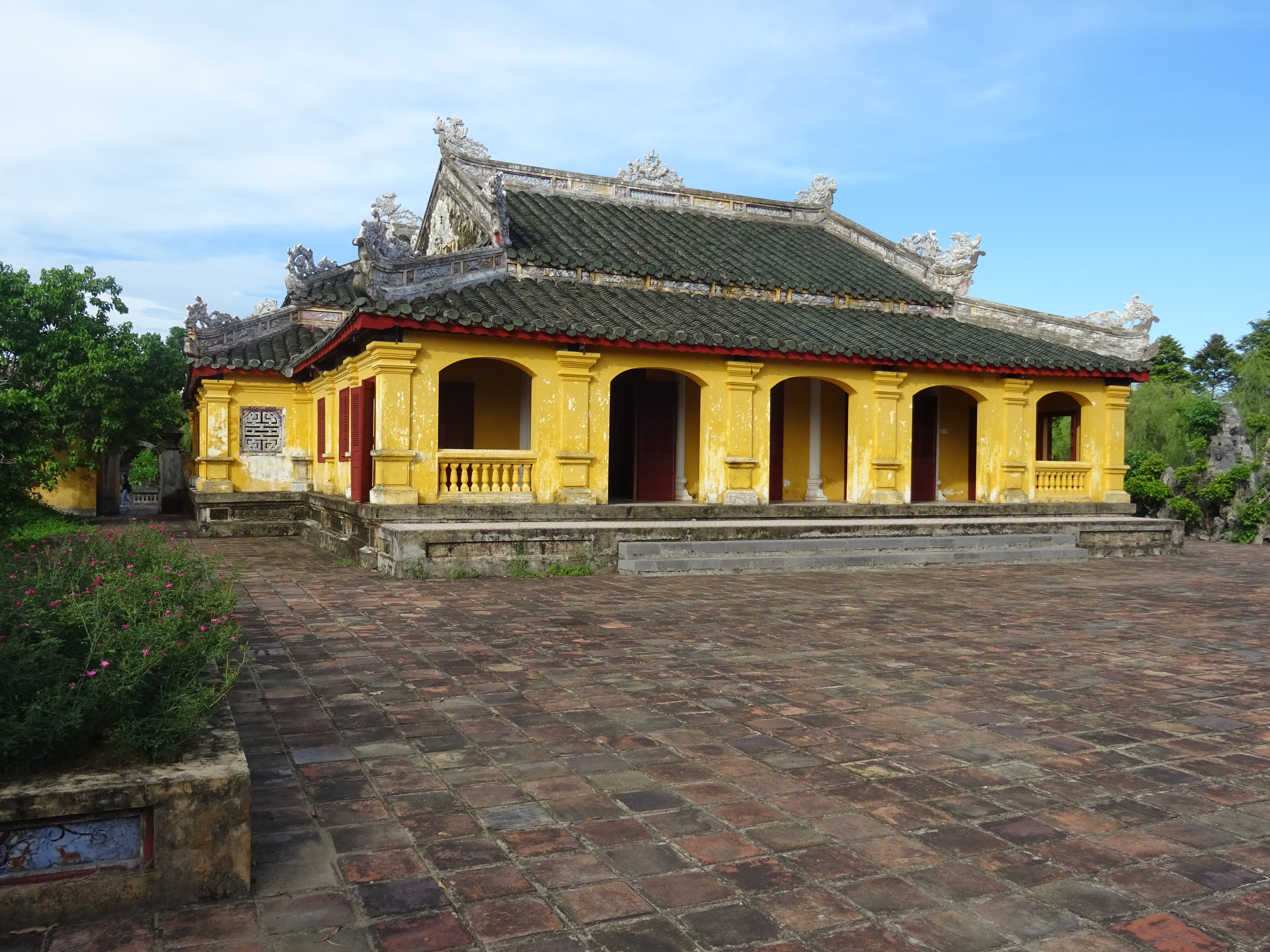
Thọ Khang điện (壽康殿)- Hall of Thọ Khang

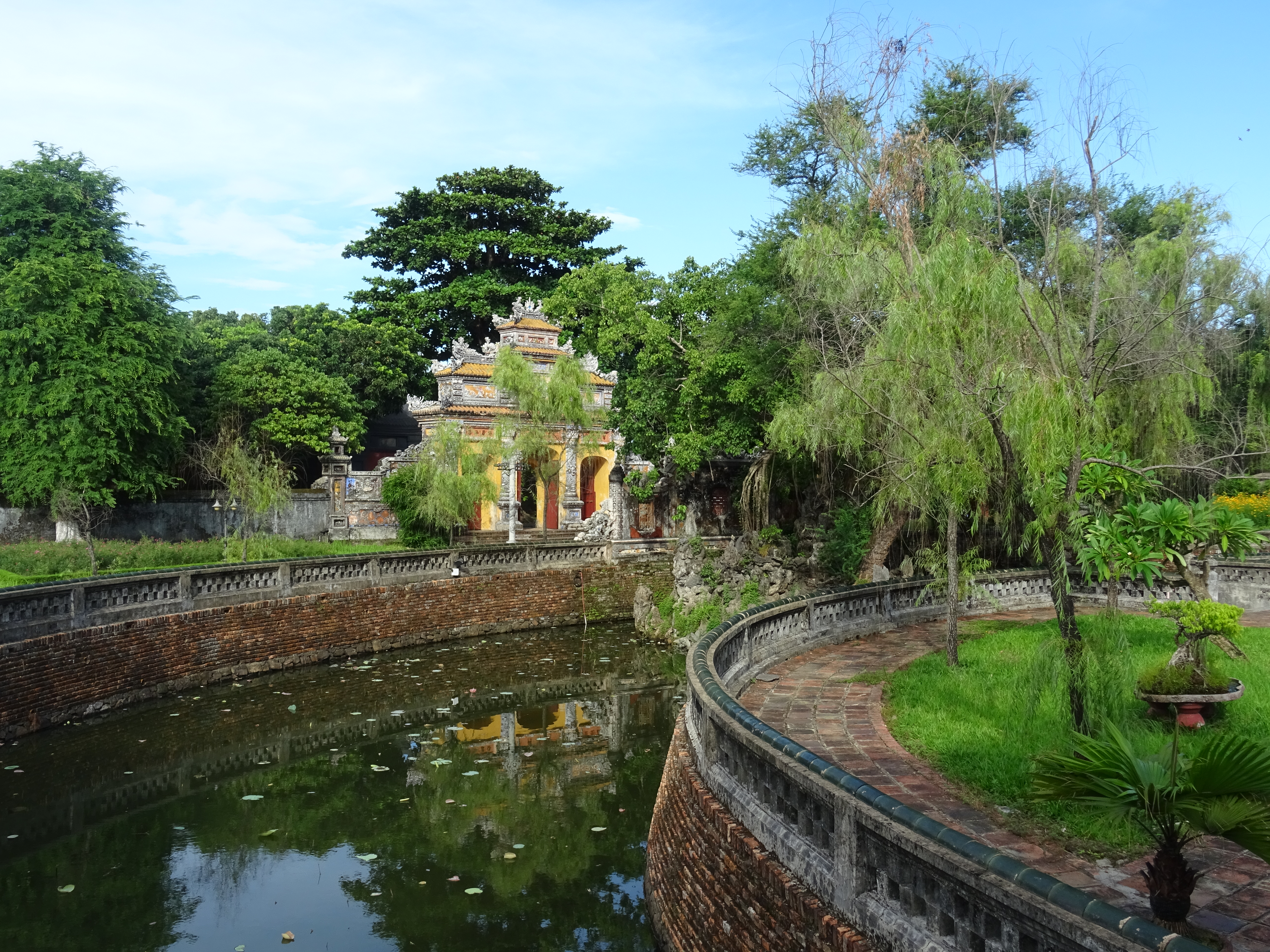
Tân Nguyệt Hồ (新月湖)

=== Diên Thọ Cung (延壽宮, Diên Thọ palace) ===
Diên Thọ Palace (Chinese: 延壽宮) is a palace complex within the Hue Imperial Citadel, serving as the residence of the Nguyen dynasty's Empress Dowagers or Grand Empress Dowagers. Located west of the Forbidden City, north of Phung Tien hall, and south of Truong Sanh Palace, Dien Tho Palace is considered the largest remaining palace complex in the former imperial capital of Hue.

Having undergone numerous renovations, the Dien Tho Palace grounds today cover approximately 17,500 square meters, with surviving structures such as Dien Tho Main Hall, Tho Ninh Palace, Tinh Minh Pavilion, Truong Du Pavilion, and Khuong Ninh Pavilion. These structures are connected by a system of covered corridors.

Built in April 1804 as the residence of Empress Dowager Ý Tĩnh, mother of first emperor Gia Long, Dien Tho Palace (originally named as Truong Tho Palace) was subsequently renovated, repaired, and renamed several times by later emperors such as Minh Mang, Tu Duc, Thanh Thai, and Khai Dinh, becoming the residence of many Nguyen dynasty empress dowagers. After the fall of the Nguyen dynasty in 1945, although many structures within the Imperial Citadel were severely damaged or disappeared, the entire Dien Tho Palace complex remained almost intact.

In 1993, Dien Tho Palace was included in the list of 16 relics belonging to the Hue Imperial Citadel complex recognized as a World Cultural Heritage site. The name Dien Tho Palace was given during the reign of Emperor Khai Dinh.

Name of the palace in different eras:

- Trường Thọ Cung (長壽宮): originally named in 1804
- Từ Thọ Cung (慈壽宮): changed in 1821
- Gia Thọ Cung (嘉壽宮): changed in 1849
- Ninh Thọ Cung (寧壽宮): changed in 1901
- Diên Thọ Cung (延壽宮): changed in 1916 and remains until now
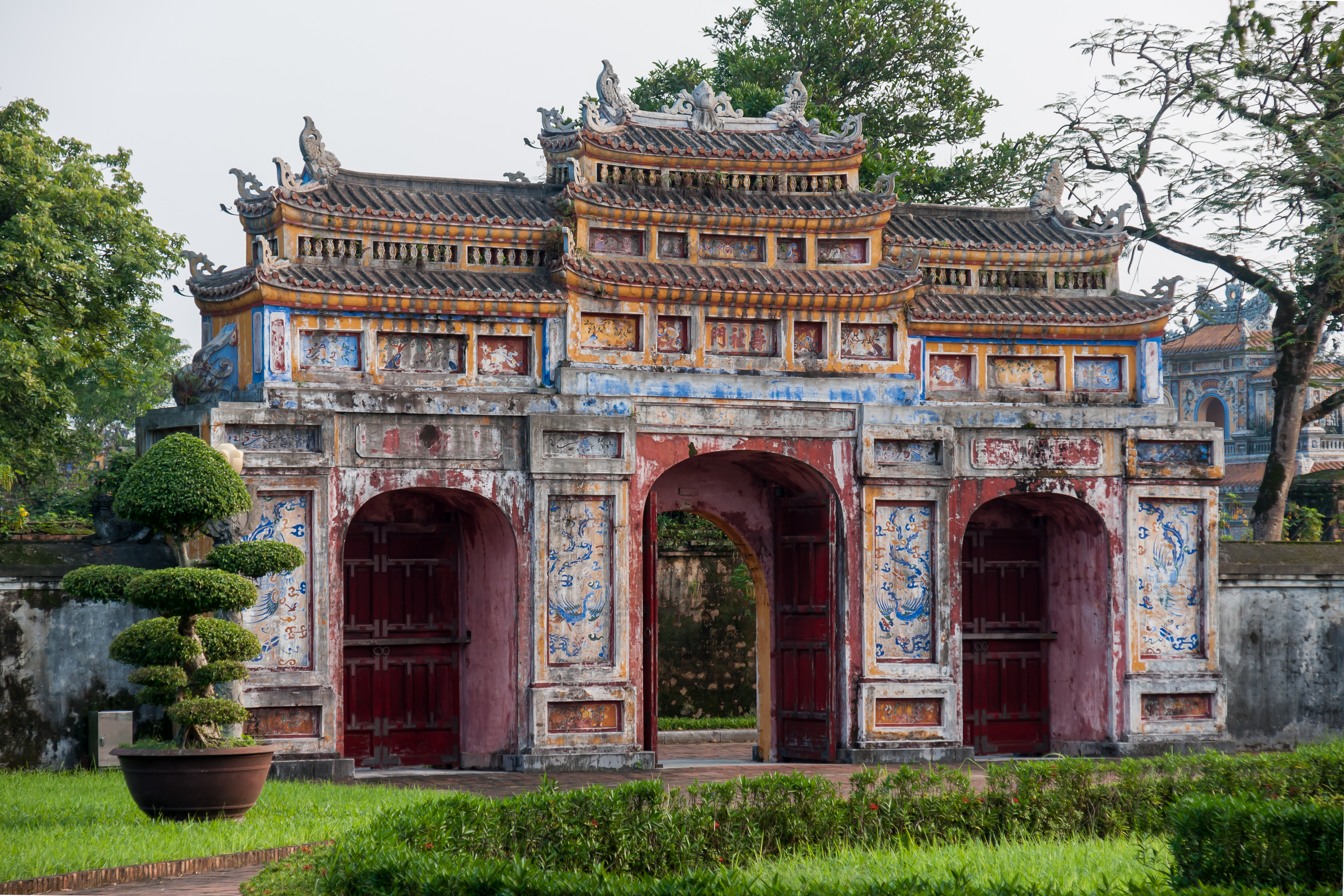
Thọ Chỉ Môn (壽祉門)- Main gate to the Diên Thọ Palace

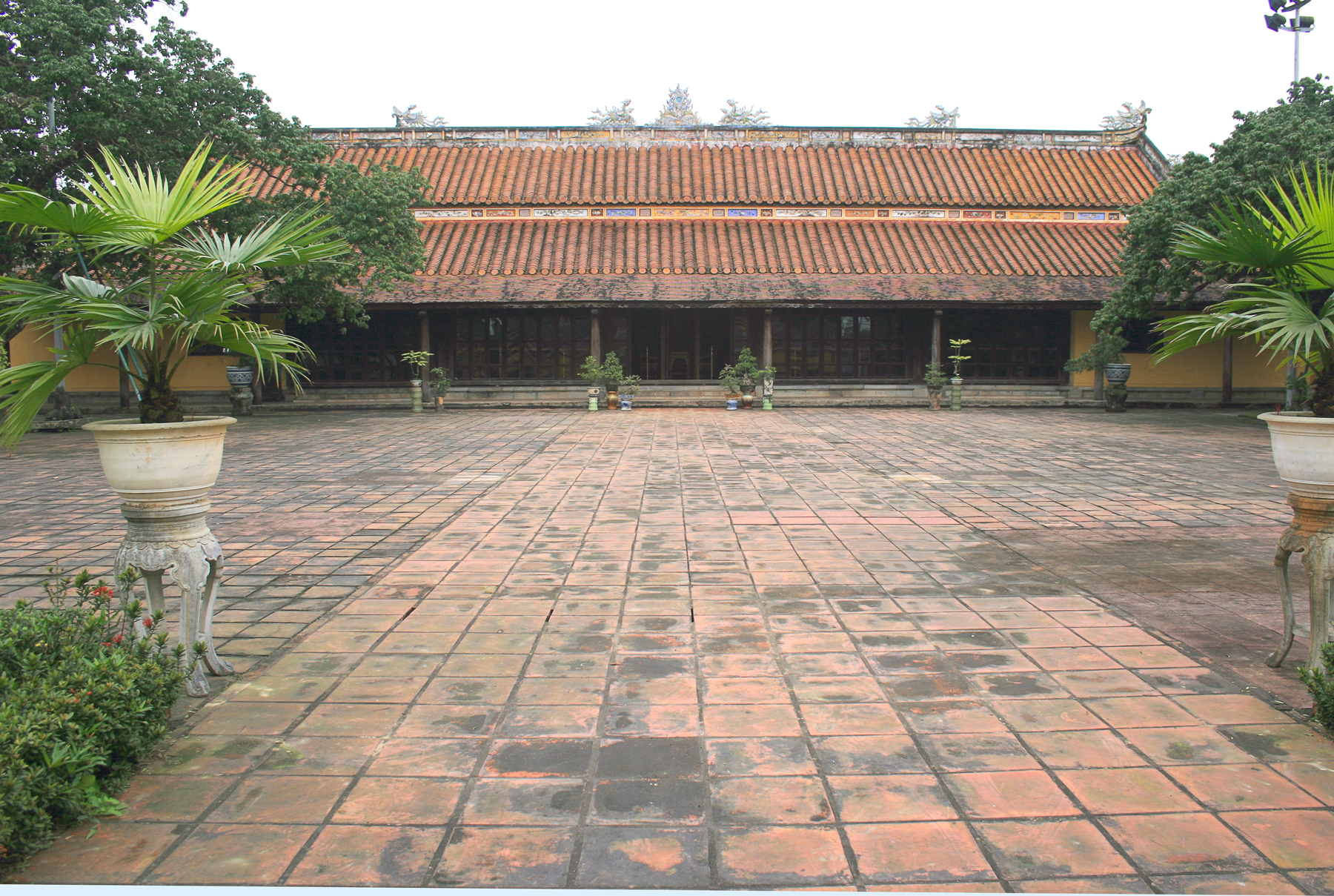
Main hall of the Diên Thọ Palace (Chính điện, 正殿)

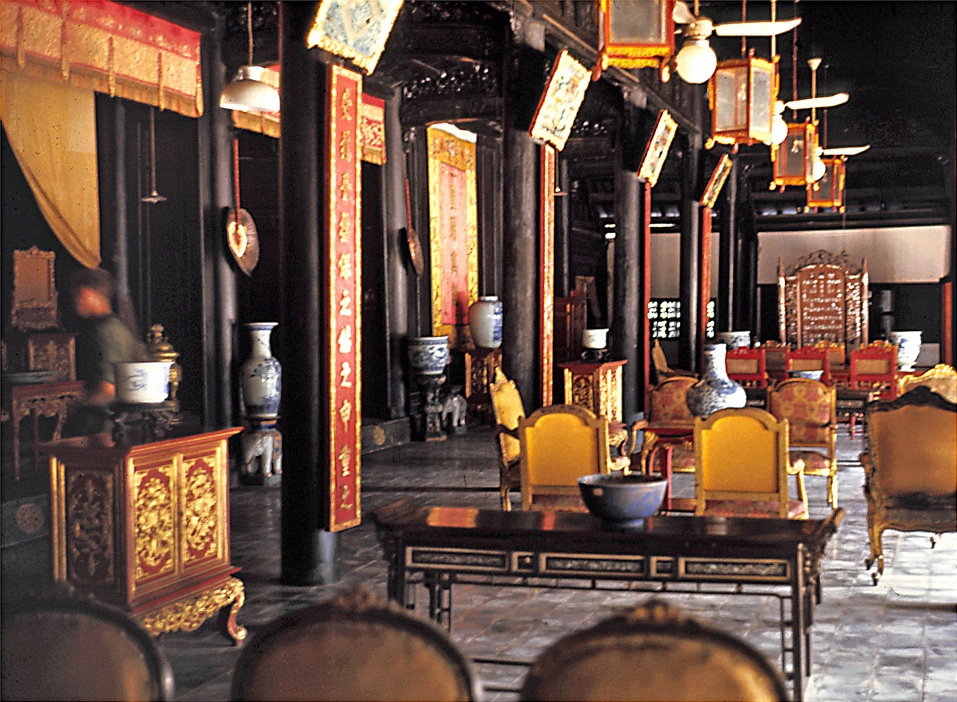
Interior of the main hall

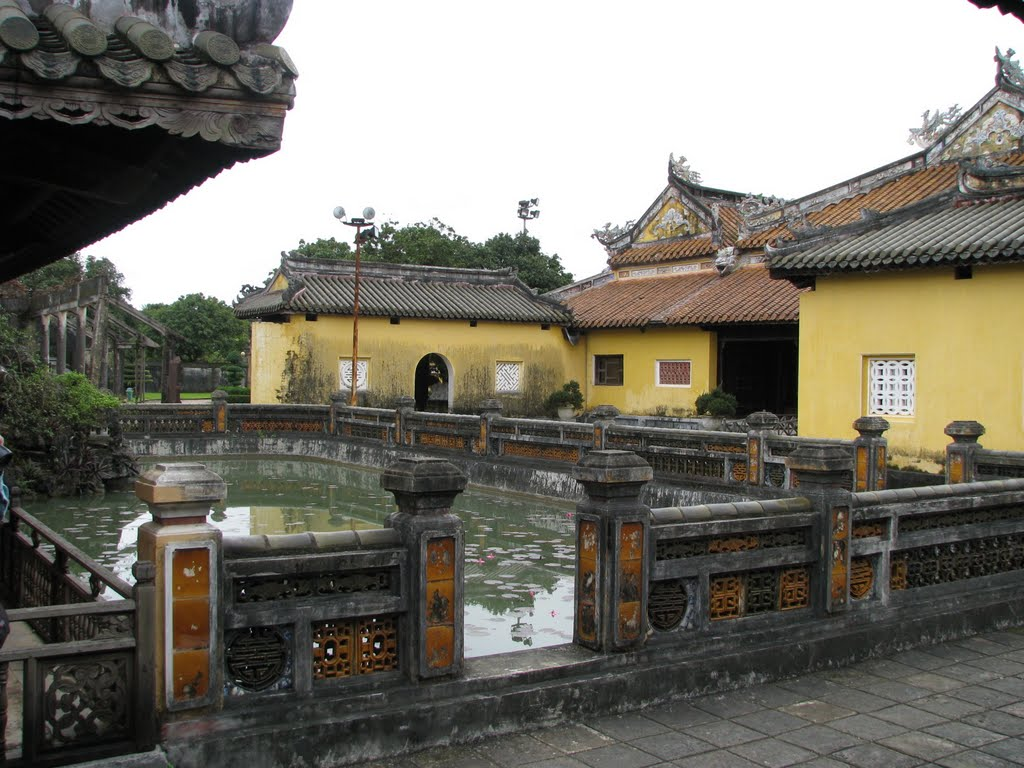
A lake behind the main hall

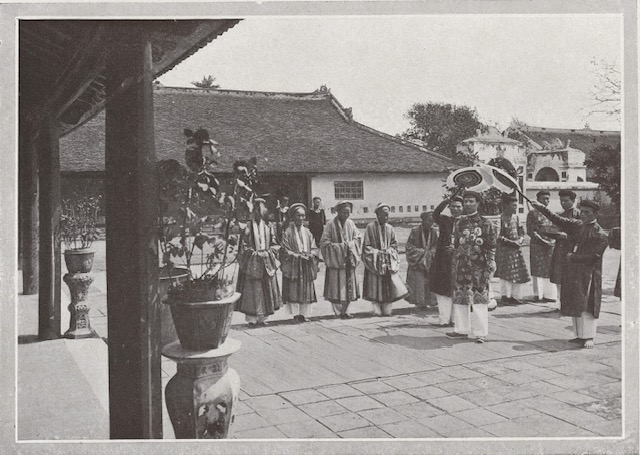
Emperor Khải Định visiting his mother

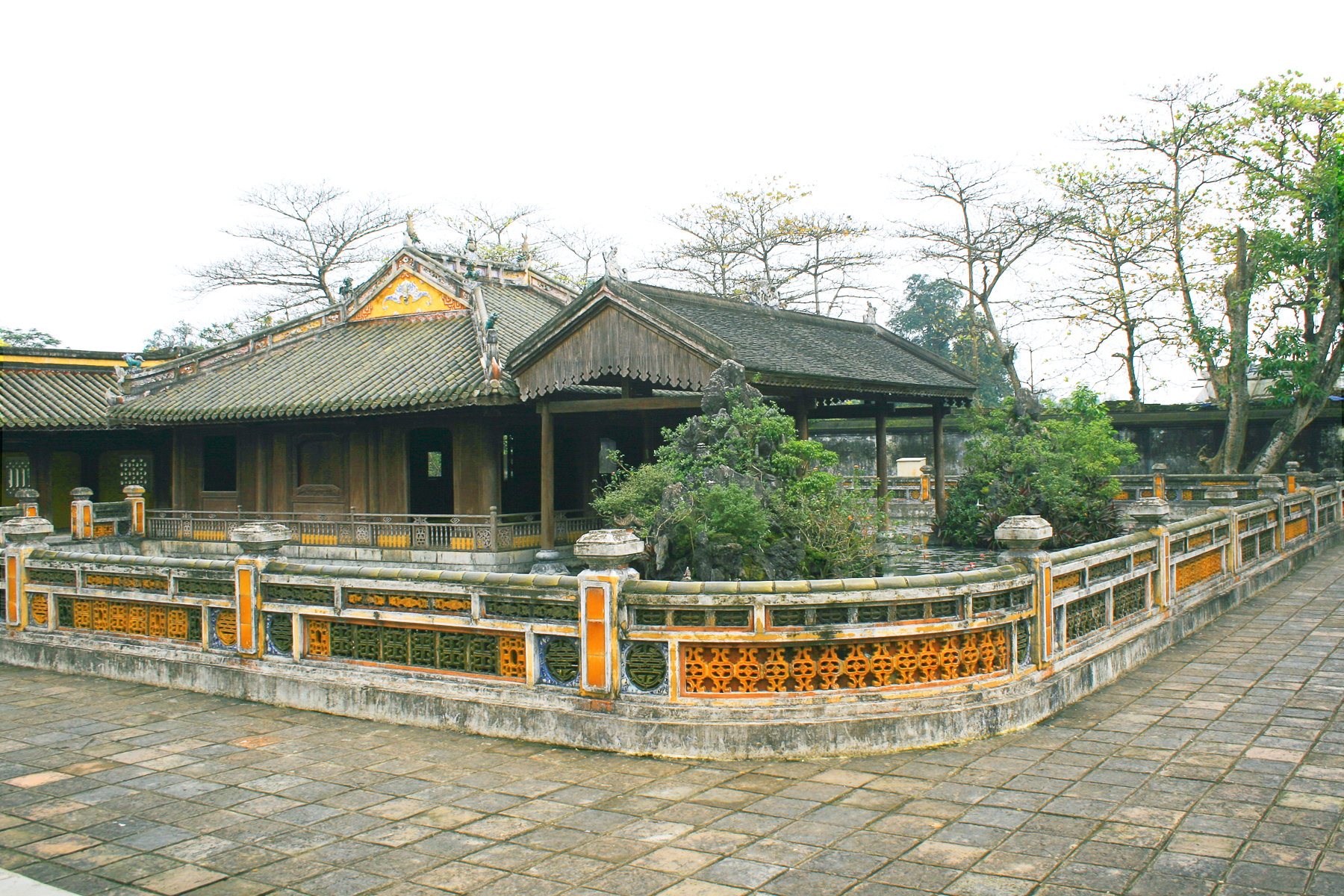
Trường Du Tạ(長偸榭)- Truong Du Pavilion, a resting place of Empress mothers built in 1849

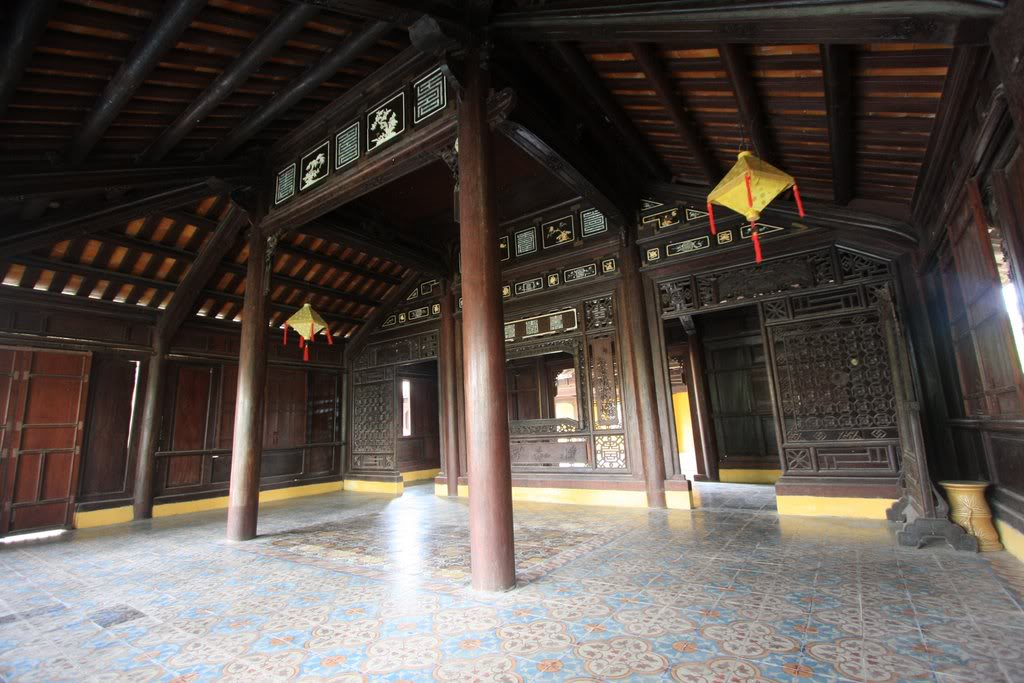
Inside of the Truong Du Pavilion

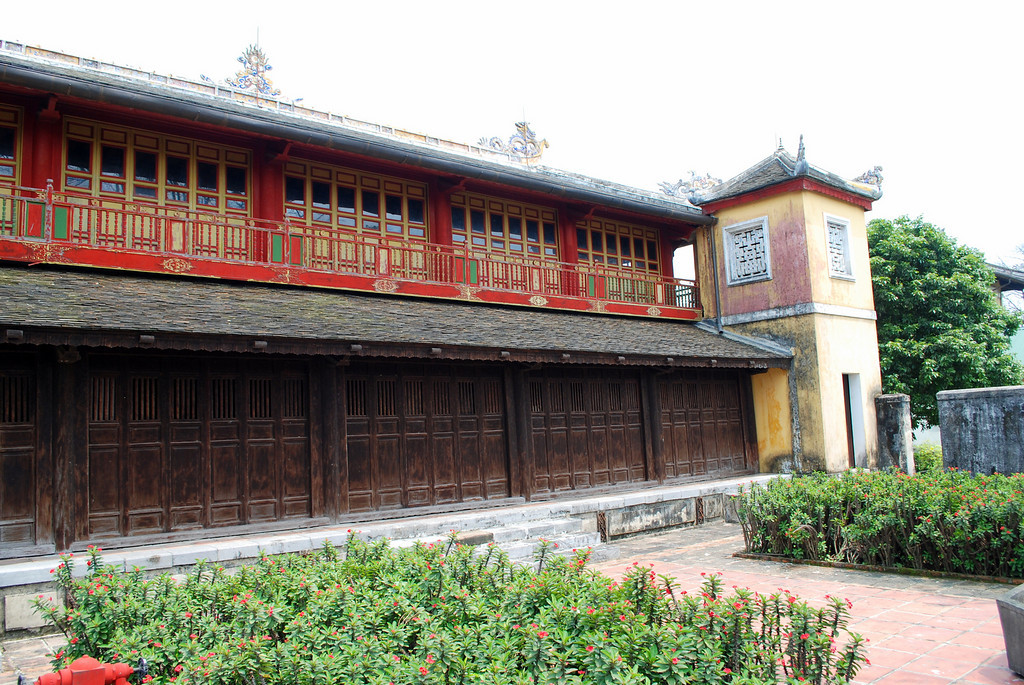
Khương Ninh Các or Phước Thọ am (幅壽庵) - A Buddhist Temple and worshipping place for Empress Mothers built in 1830

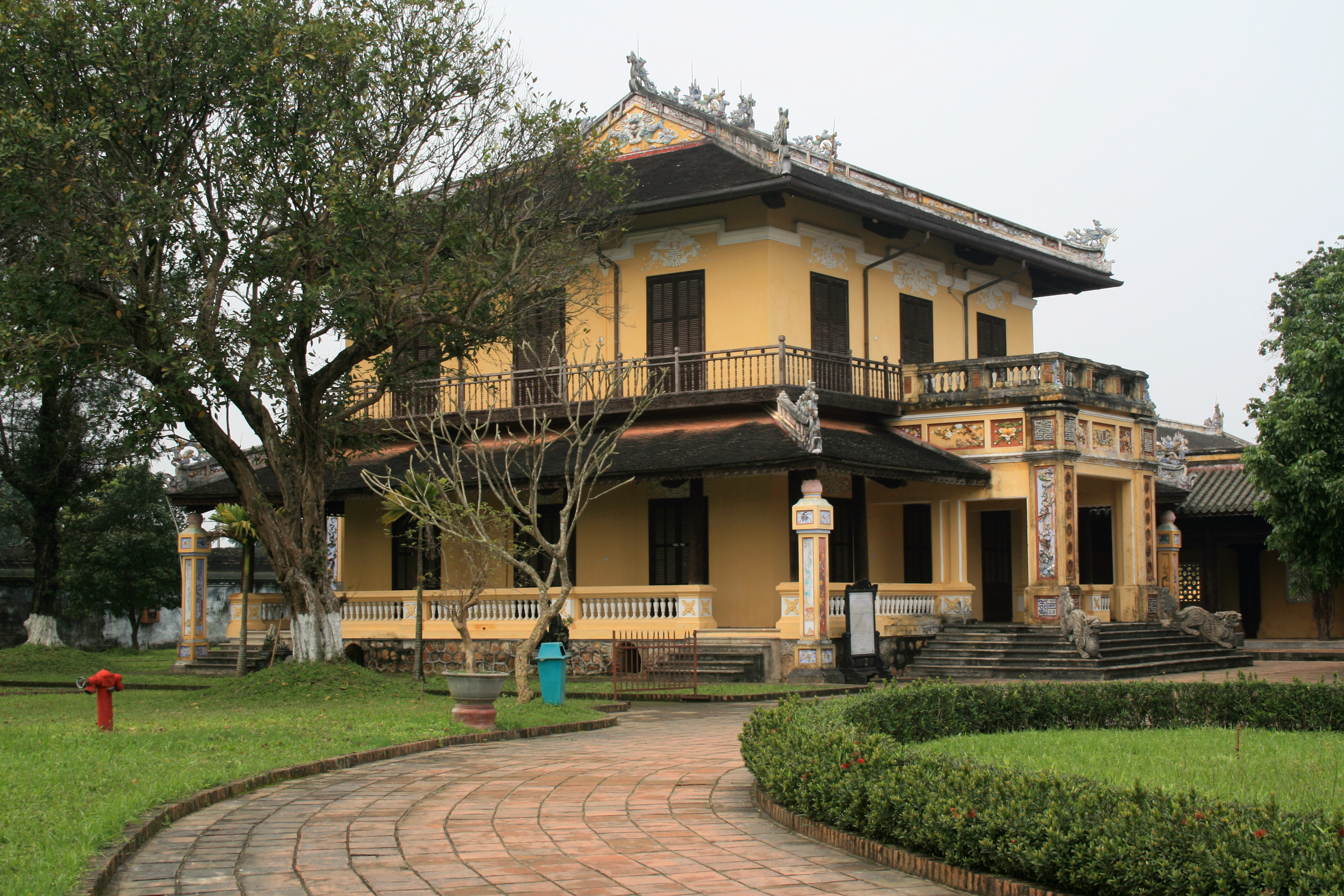
Tịnh Minh lâu (静明樓), built as the resting place of Emperor Bảo Đại's mother in 1927

== Temples and places of worship ==
=== Triệu Miếu (肇廟) ===
Temple worshiping Nguyễn Kim - Founder of the Nguyễn clan and father of Nguyen Hoàng - the first lord of Cochinchina - Đàng Trong (16th–18th centuries). Triệu Tổ Temple was built during the reign of the first emperor of the Nguyen dynasty, in the 3rd year of Gia Long (1804).

=== Thái Miếu (太廟) ===
Temple worshiping 9 Nguyen lords and their great mandarins, generals, built in the 3rd year of Emperor Gia Long (1804). The building is now ruin.

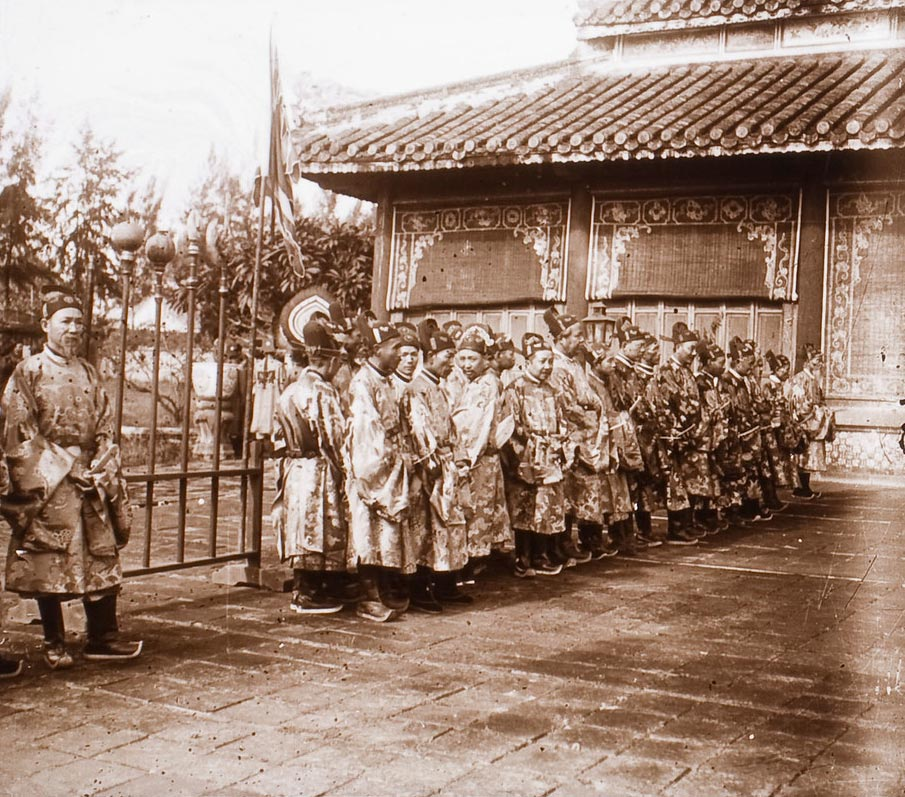
Court officials in front of the Thái Miếu (太廟) Temple in the Imperial Palace.

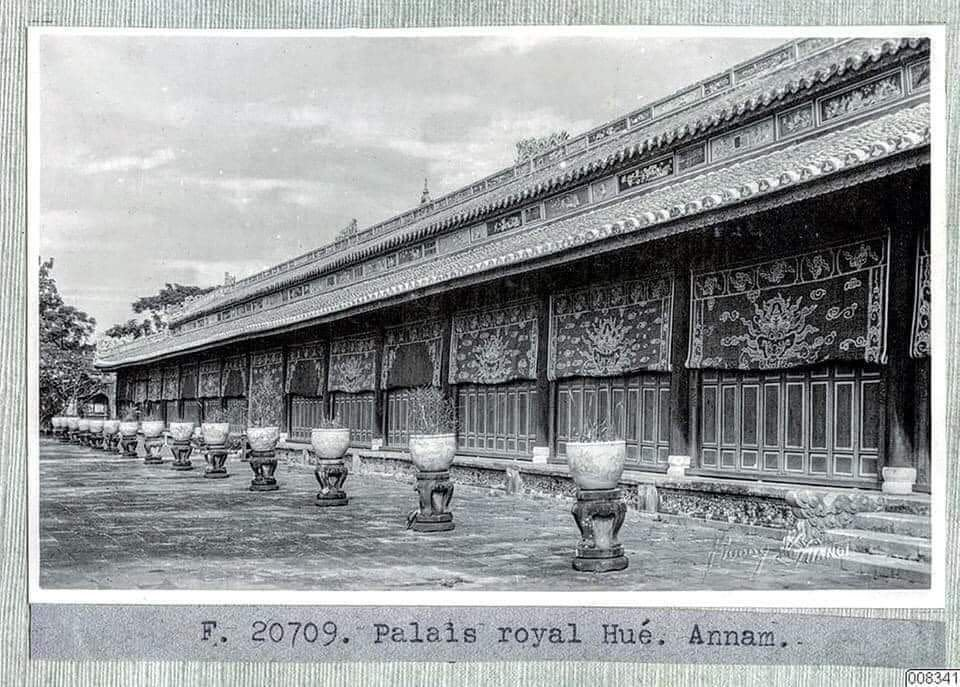
Thái Miếu, 1920.

=== Hưng Miếu (興廟) ===
Temple worshiping Nguyễn Phúc Luân and Nguyễn Thị Hoàn, the parent of the first emperor of the Nguyen dynasty (Gia Long), built in the 3rd year of Emperor Gia Long (1804)

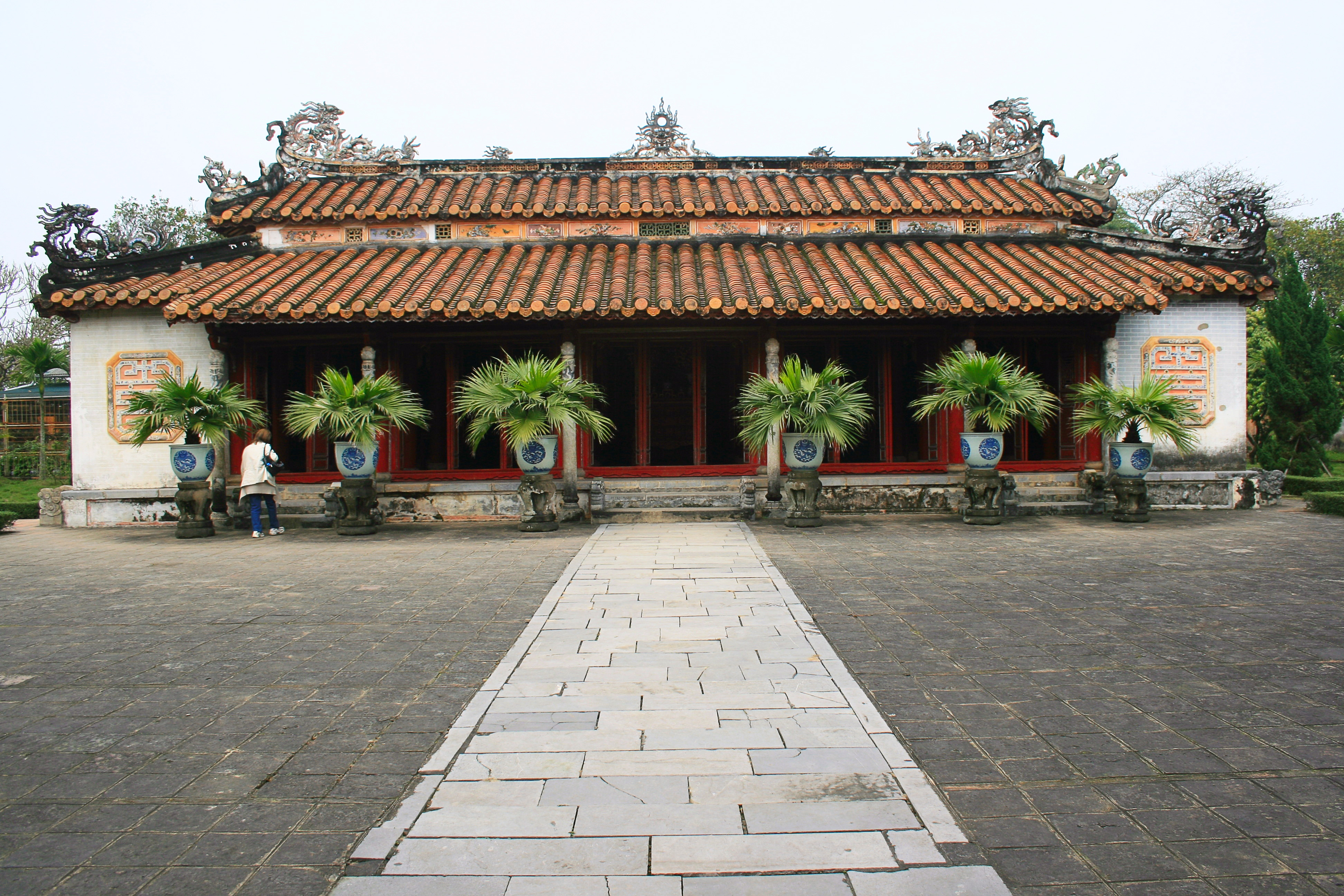
Hưng Miếu Temple.

=== Thế Miếu (世廟) ===
The temple where the royal court came to worship the deceased emperors. Women in the court (including the empress) were not allowed to attend these ceremonies.

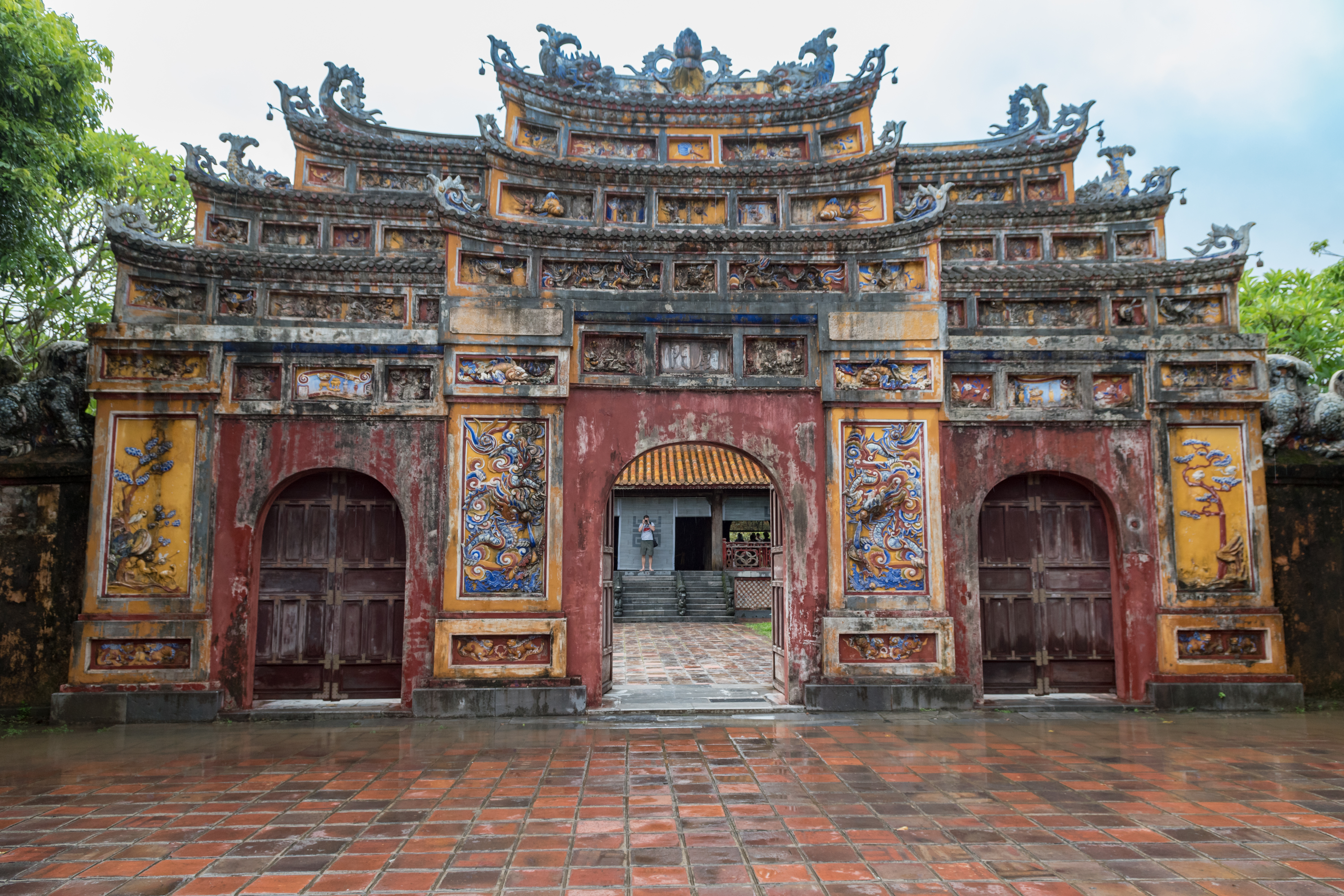
Miếu Môn (廟門) the gate to get into and the Thế Miếu temple.

==== The Nine Tripod Cauldrons of Nguyễn dynasty ====
Cửu Đỉnh (九鼎) of the Nguyen dynasty (Chinese: 阮朝九鼎) are nine bronze tripods placed in front of the courtyard of Thế Miếu temple in the Hue Imperial Citadel. The Nine Tripods were commissioned by Emperor Minh Mang in the winter of 1835 and inaugurated on March 1, 1837.

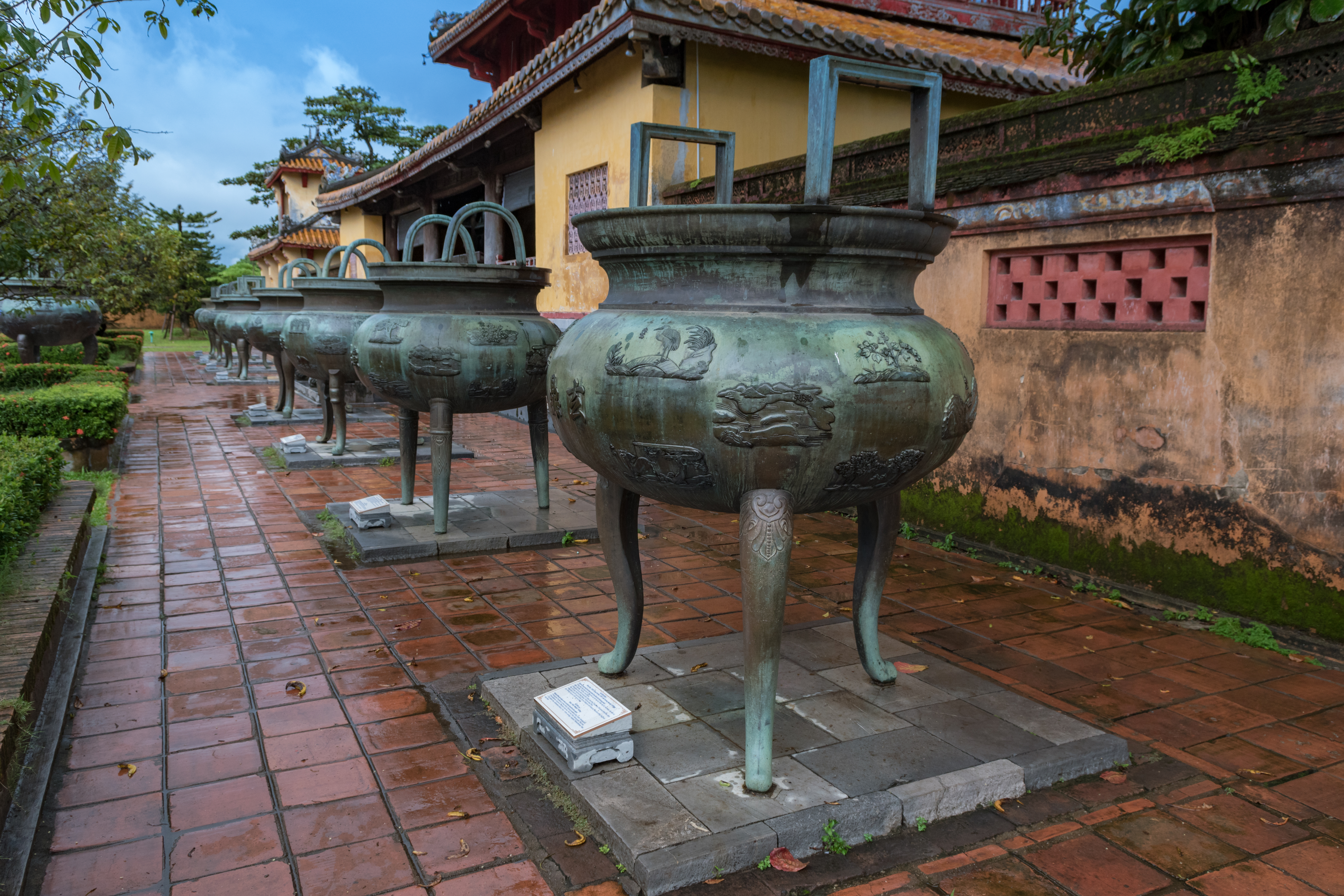
The Nine Tripod Cauldrons

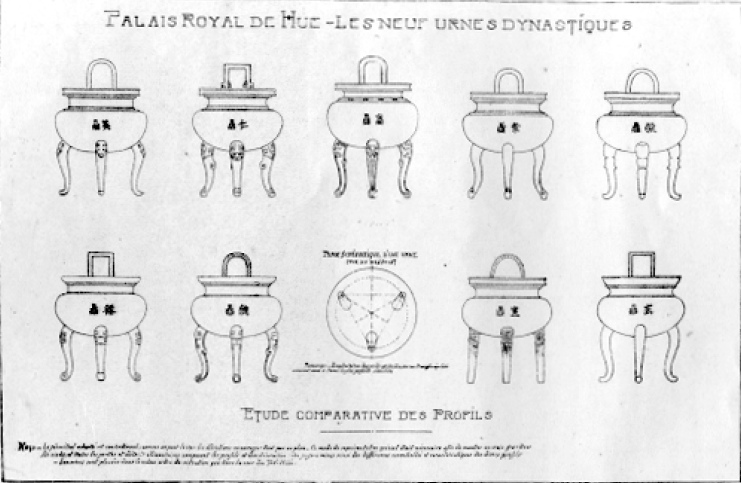

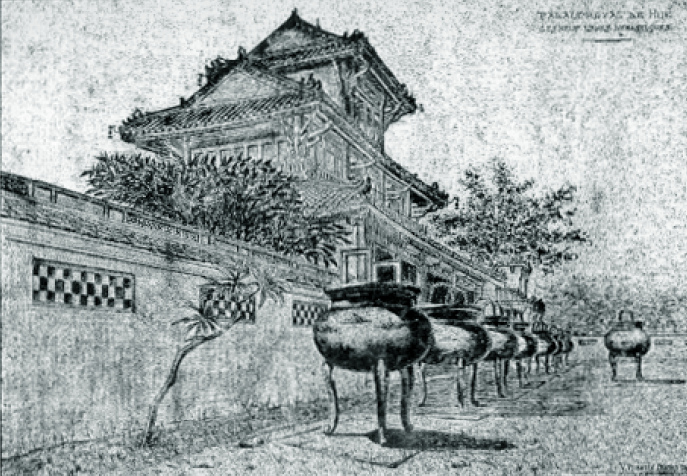
1914

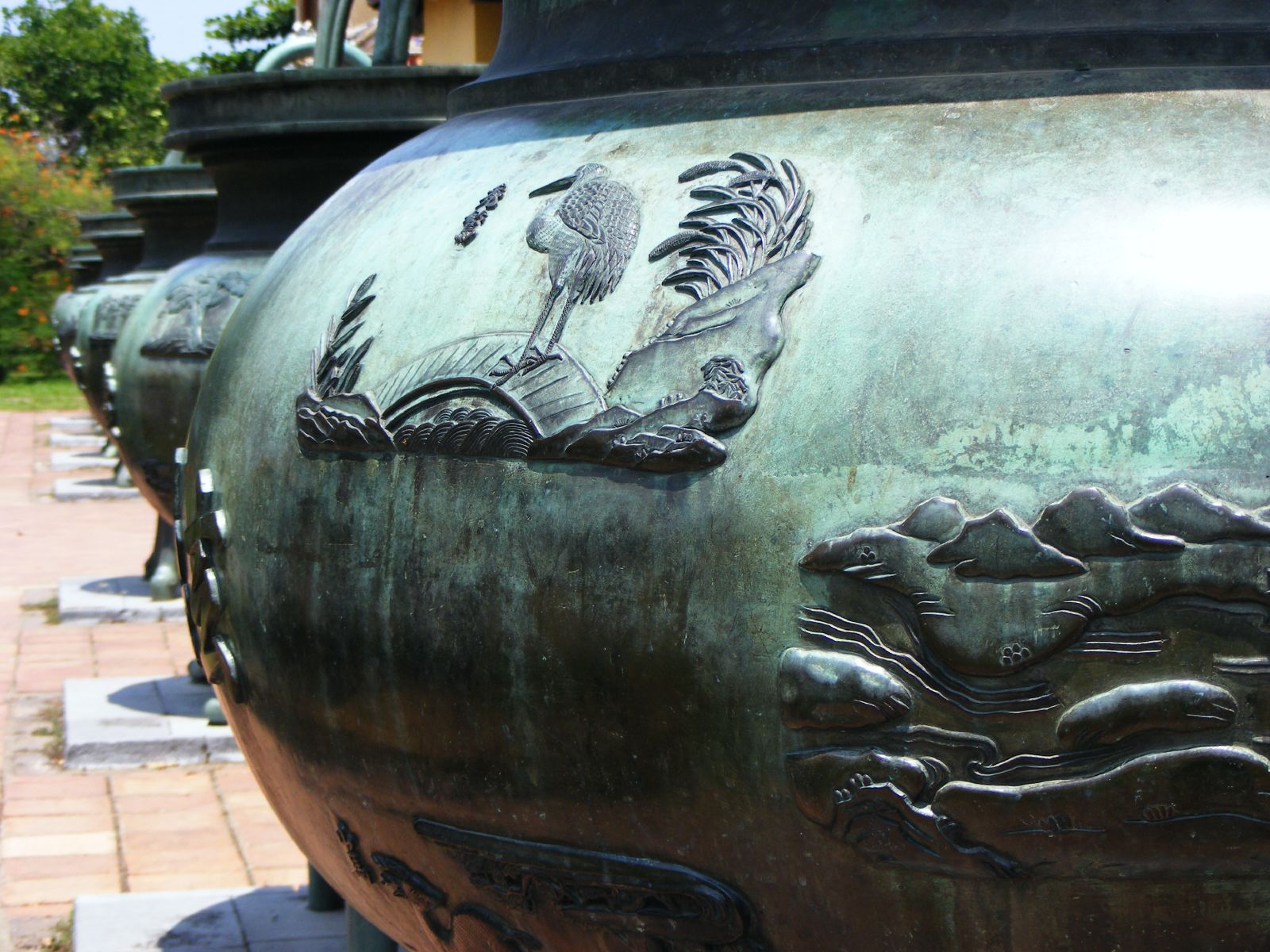
Crane relief engraved on one of the cauldrons

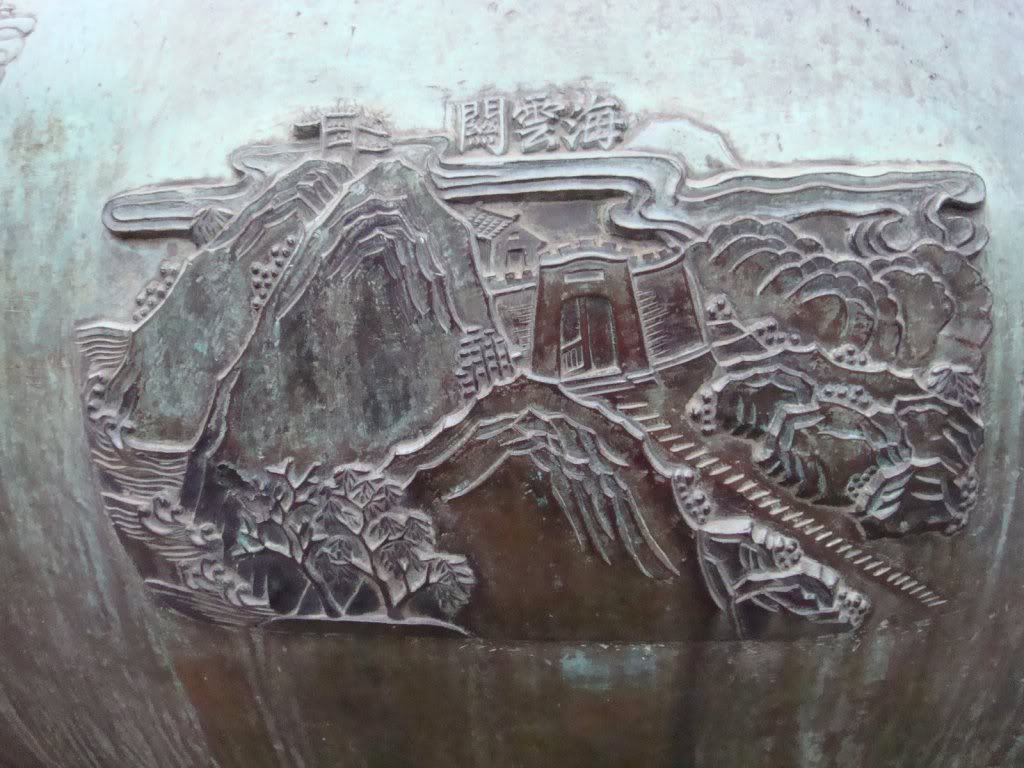
Engraving of Hải Vân Pass (海雲關) on a cauldron

Inspired by the Nine Tripods of the Xia dynasty of China, Emperor Minh Mang issued a decree to the Cabinet in the tenth lunar month of the year of the Goat (1835), ordering the Cabinet and the Ministry of Public Works to oversee the casting of the Nine Tripods. The rough casting of the nine tripods was completed in the fifth lunar month of the year of the Monkey (1836). However, it took nearly eight months for the Nine Tripods to be officially completed. A grand ceremony to place the tripods in the Ancestral Temple courtyard took place on March 1, 1837, presided over by Emperor Minh Mang. During the Indochina War and the Vietnam War, followed by the decline of the centrally planned economy (1975-1991), the Nine Bronze Tripods remained unmoved and intact to this day.

The Nine Bronze Tripods consist of nine bronze tripods, each with a unique name corresponding to the posthumous title of a Nguyen dynasty emperor. Each tripod is engraved with 17 motifs and one calligraphic inscription, depicting themes of the universe, mountains and rivers, birds and animals, products, weapons, etc., forming a panoramic picture of a unified Vietnam during the Nguyen dynasty. The names of each Cauldrons:

- Cao Đỉnh (高鼎)
- Nhân Đỉnh (仁鼎)
- Chương Đỉnh (章鼎)
- Anh Đỉnh (英鼎)
- Nghị Đỉnh (毅鼎)
- Thuần Đỉnh (純鼎)
- Tuyên Đỉnh( 宣鼎)
- Dụ Đỉnh (裕鼎)
- Huyền Đỉnh (玄鼎)

The Nine Tripods were finished in May of the lunar calendar in 1836. However, the work of attaching the embossed images took quite a long time. Eventually, eight months later, in the spring of 1837, the Nine Tripods were officially completed.

=== Phụng Tiên Điện (奉先殿, Hall of Phụng Tiên ) ===
The hall was used to worship Emperors and Empresses of the Nguyen dynasty. Unlike The other temples accessed only by men, this palace allowed women to come and worship. The place was destroyed in the Vietnam war.

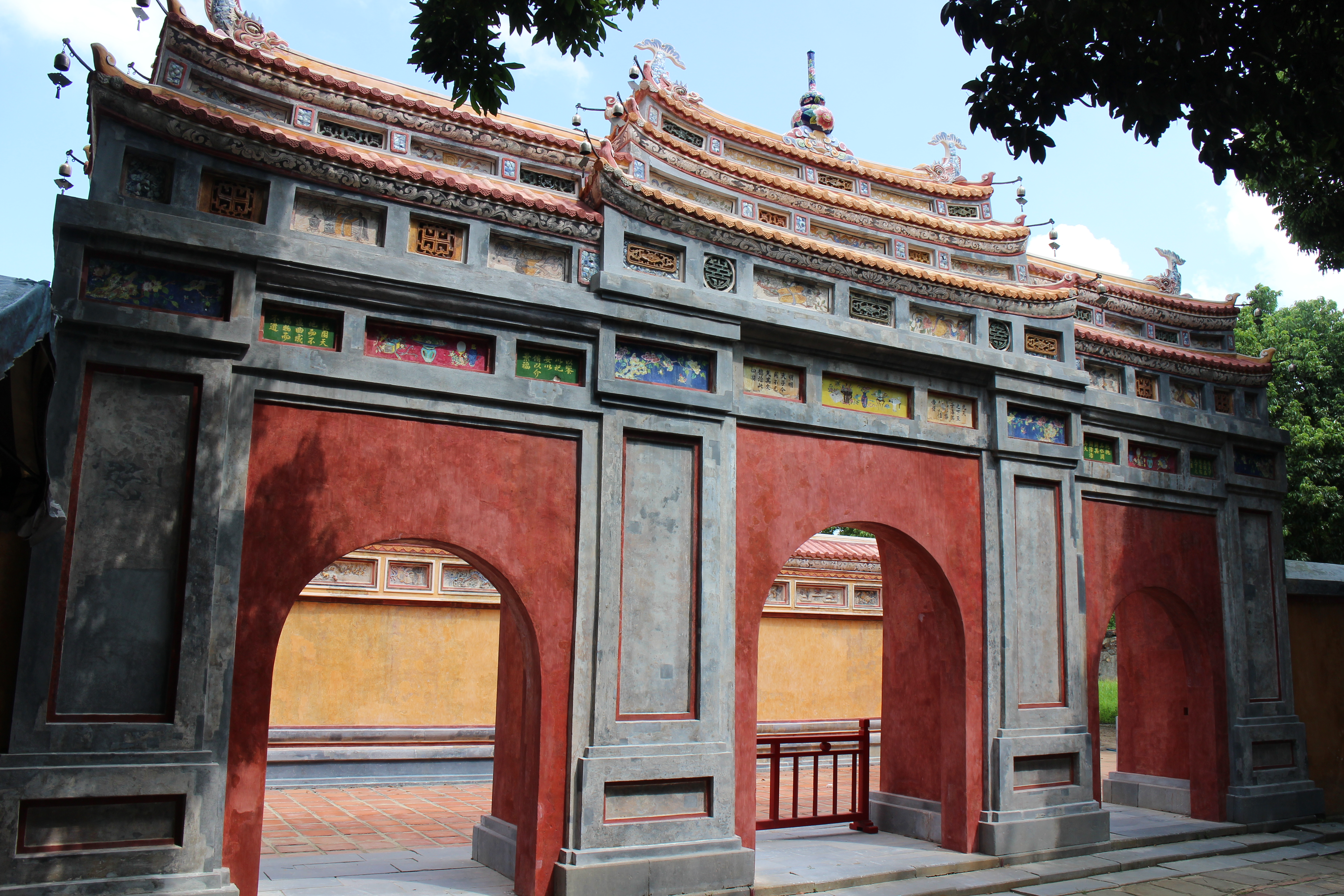
Main gate of the Hall of Phụng Tiên.

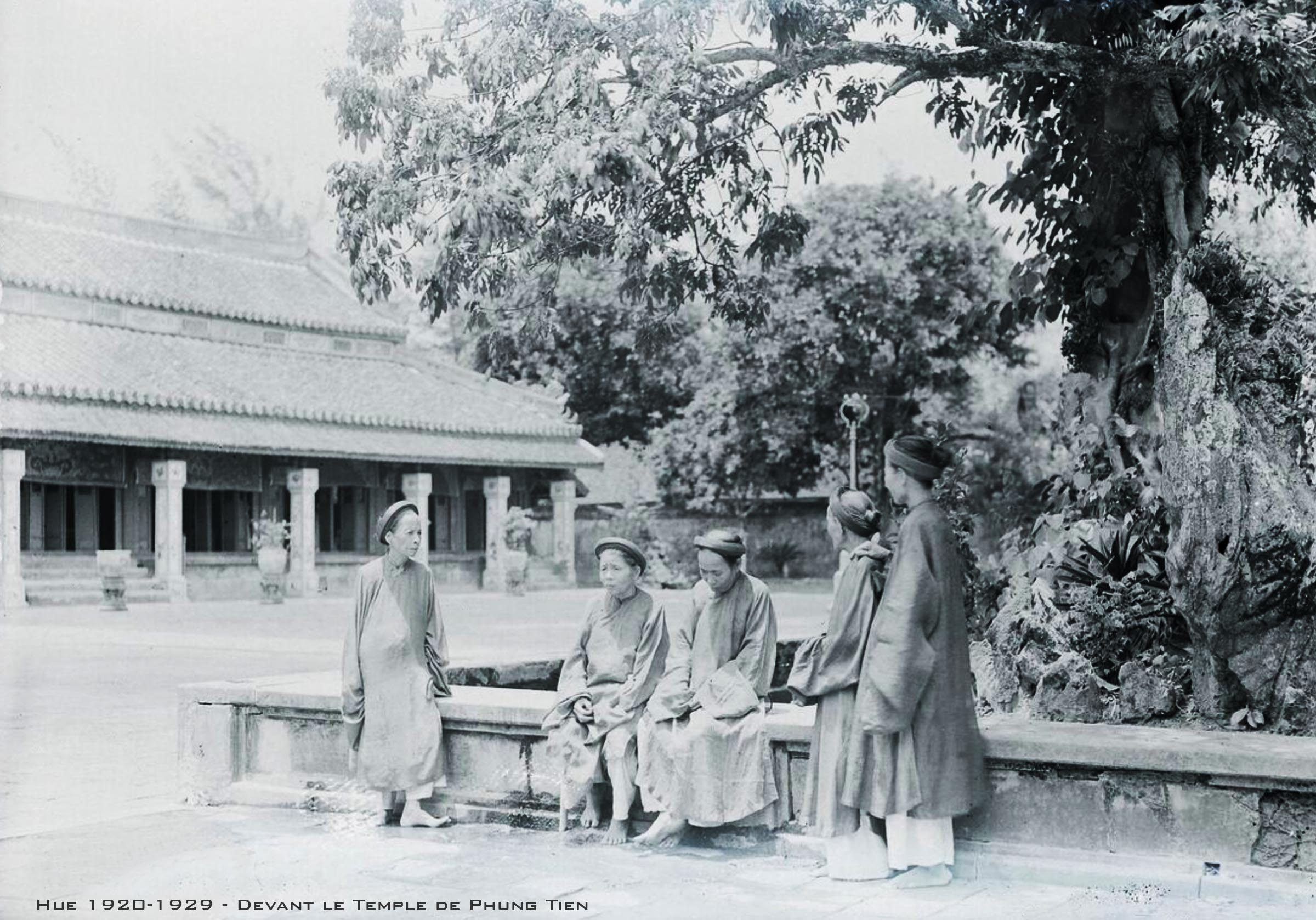
Court ladies in front of courtyard of the Hall of Phụng Tiên.

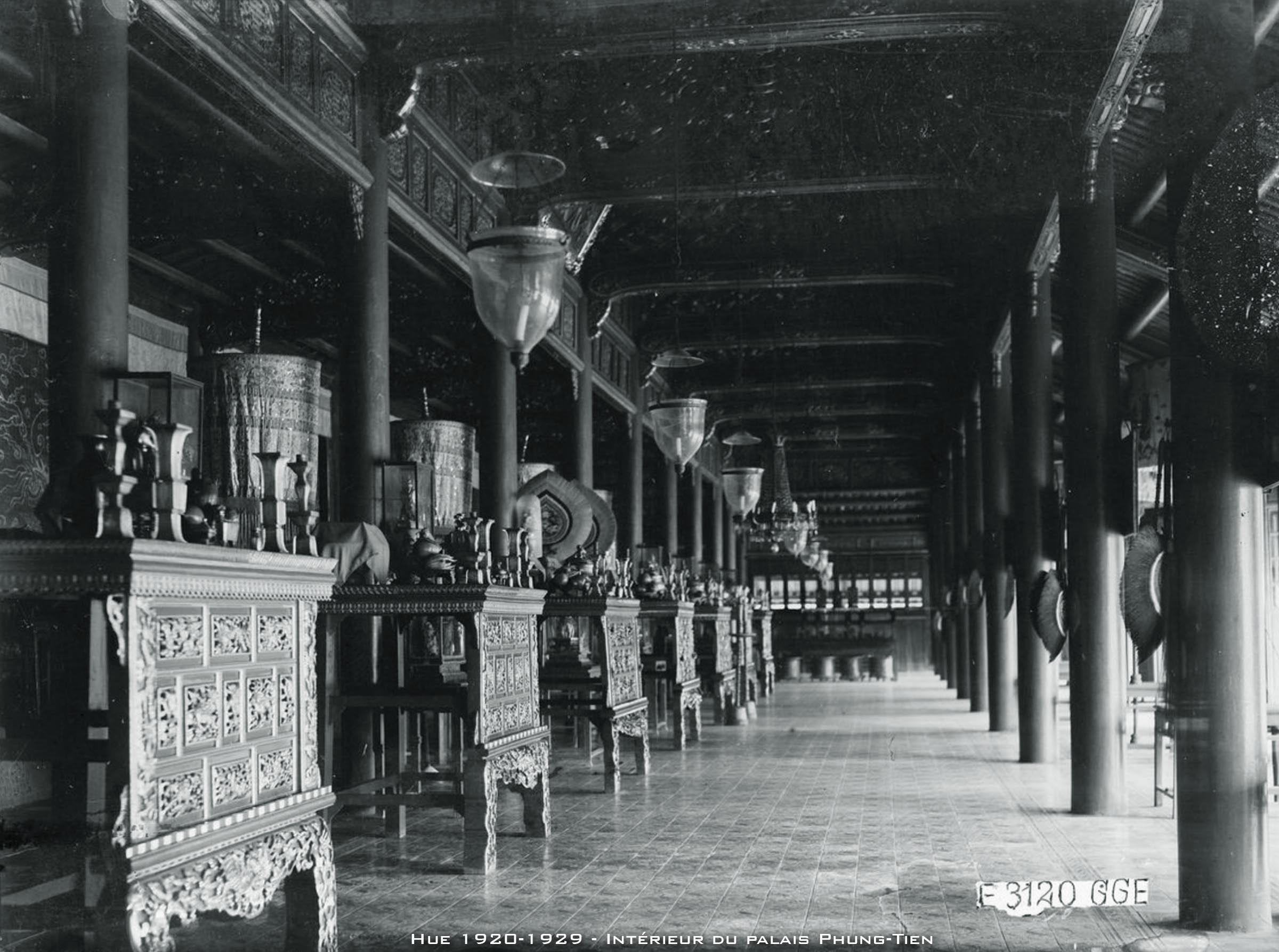
Inside of Phung Tien Hall.

=== Hiển Lâm Các (顯臨閣, Hien Lam Pavilion) ===
It is an architectural work located in the imperial palace, built in 1821 and completed in 1822 under the reign of Emperor Minh Mang, along with The Mieu. Showing the areas located in the worship area in the Hue Imperial Citadel, it is 17 m high and is the tallest structure in the Imperial Citadel. This is considered a monument to remember the achievements of the Nguyen emperors and the great mandarins, generals of the dynasty.

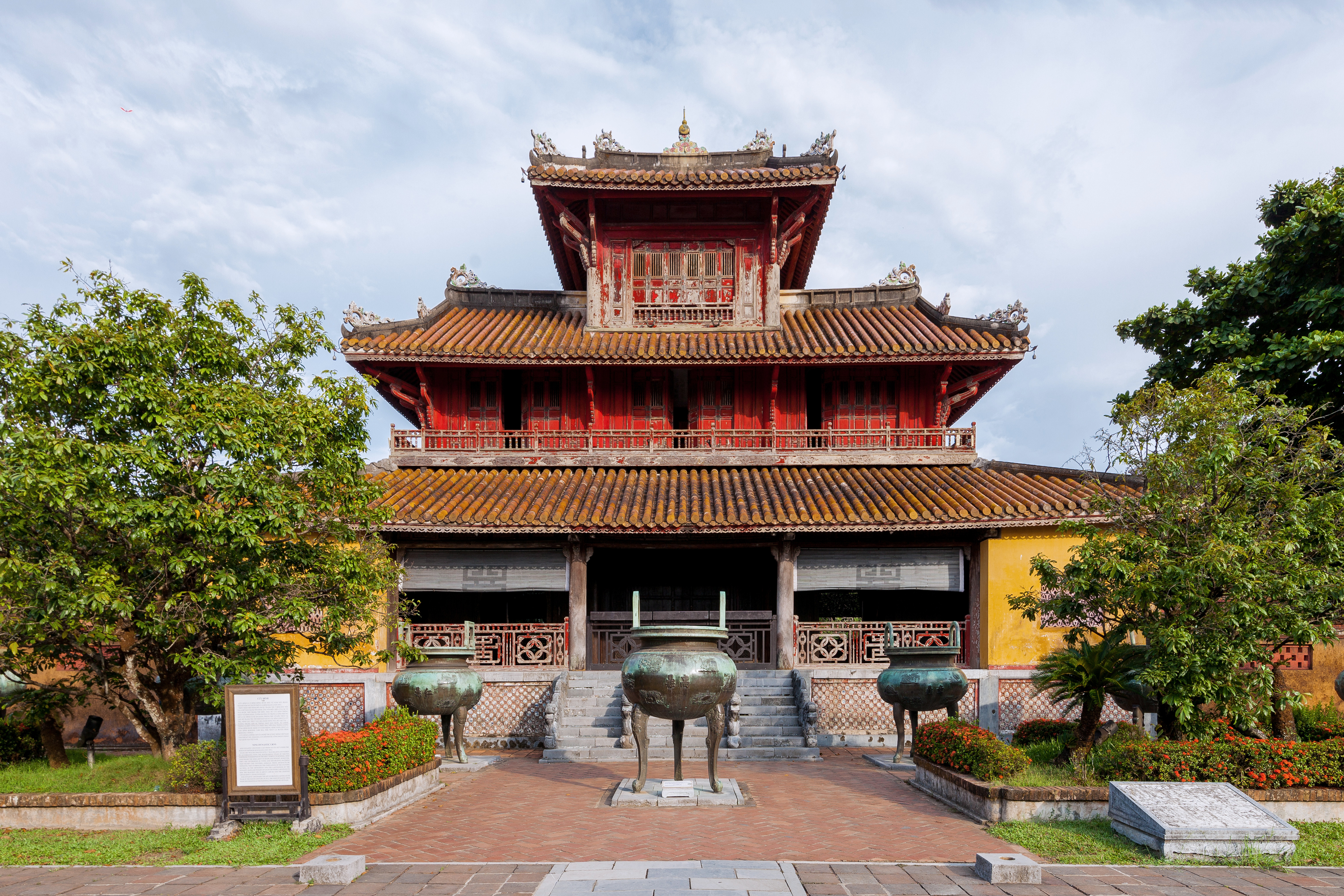
Pavilion of Hiển Lâm (Hiển Lâm Các, 顯臨閣)

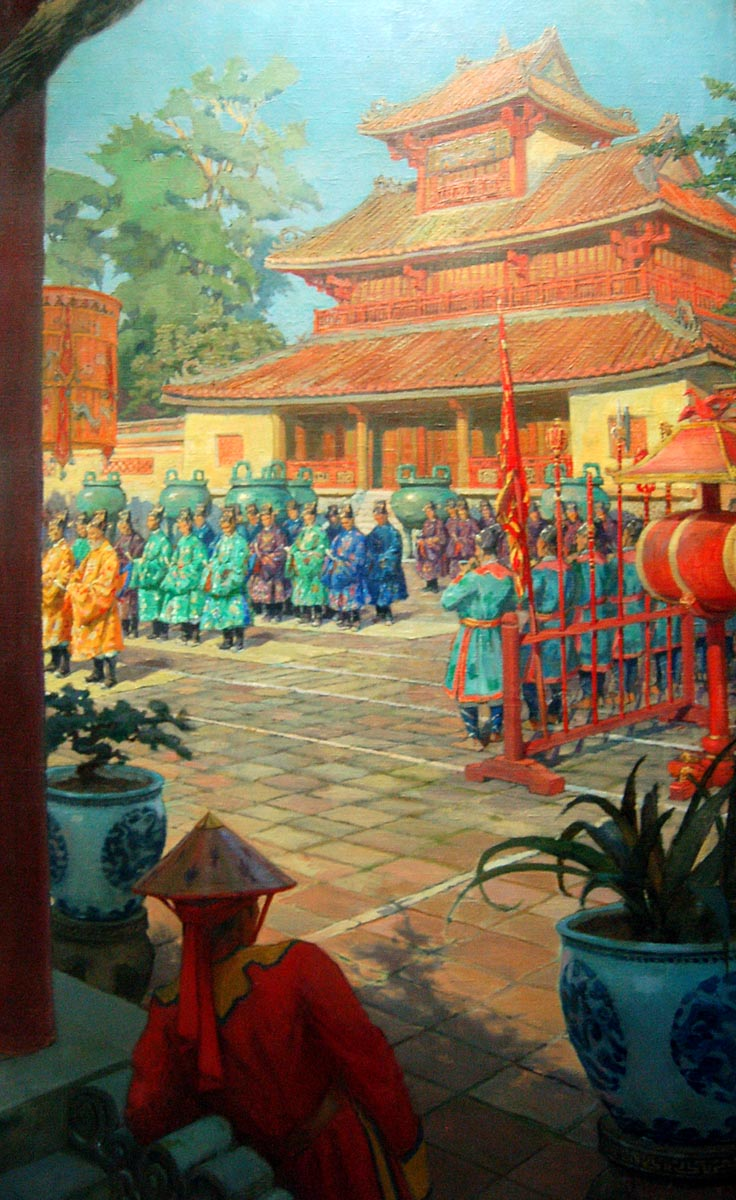
Court officials in front of the Hiển Lâm Pavilion.

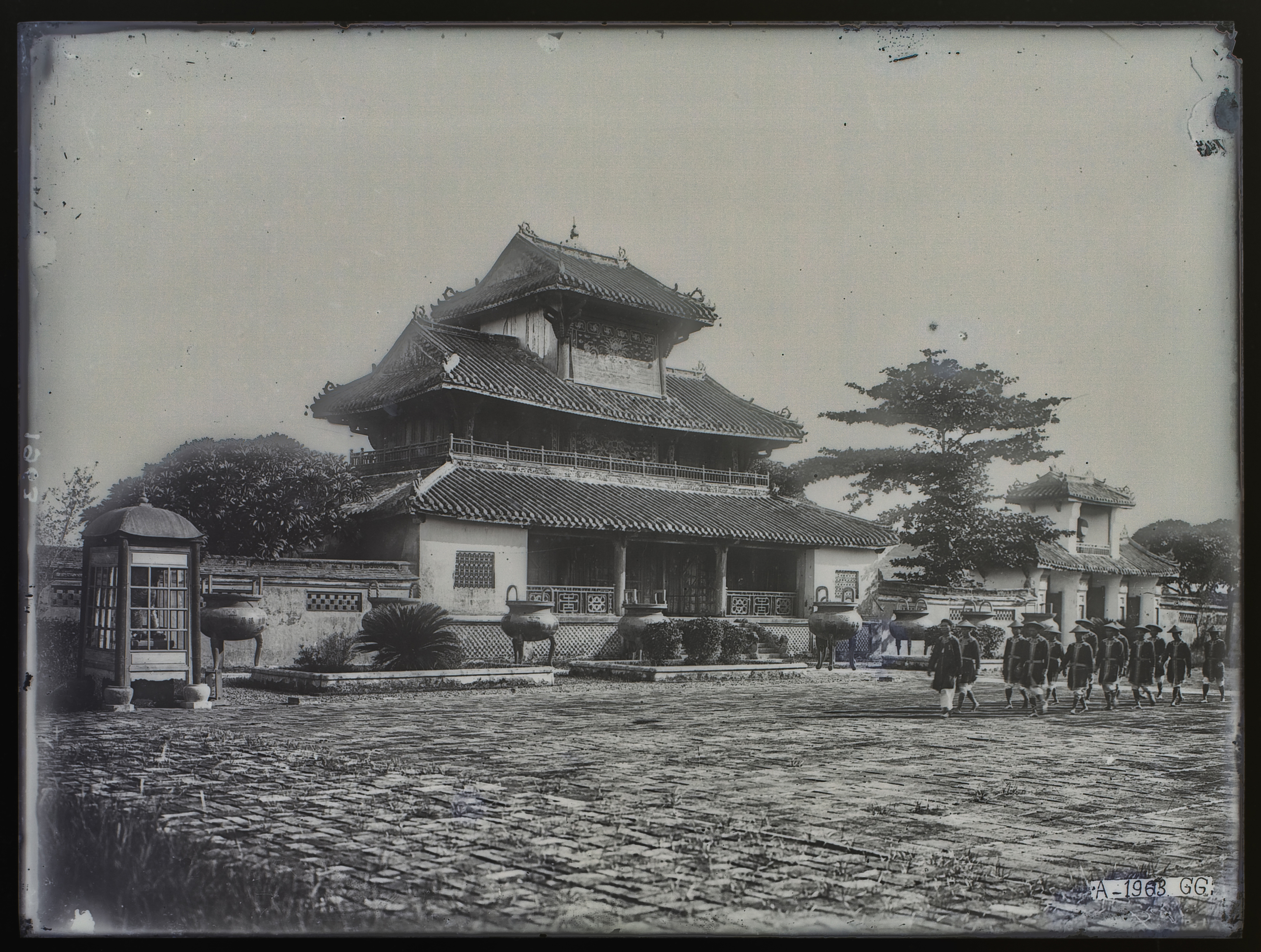
Hiển Lâm Pavilion in 1920.

== Inner Court (Purple Forbidden City) ==
Purple Forbidden City (chữ Hán: 紫禁城; Vietnamese: Tử Cấm thành) was located behind Thái Hòa throne hall, built on 3rd year of Gia Long (1804) previously named as Cung thành (chữ Hán: 宮城). It was later expanded by late succeeding emperors and renamed "Purple Forbidden City" in 1822. Most of buildings inside was destroyed and left ruin during Indochina wars and there is the ongoing progress in restoring the buildings after the war.

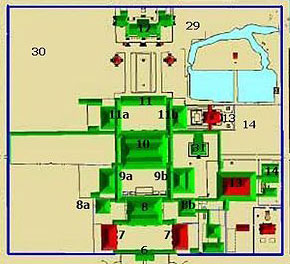
Map of the Purple Forbidden City.
6. Đại Cung Môn gate; 7. Tả Vu, Hữu Vu; 8. Cần Chánh Điện; 8a. Võ Hiển Điện; 8b. Văn Minh Điện; 9a. Trinh Minh Điện; 9b. Quang Minh Điện; 10. Càn thành Điện; 11. Khôn Thái Cung; 11a. Thuận Huy Viện; 11b. Dưỡng Tâm Viện; 12. Kiến Trung Điện; 13(upper). Thái Bình Lâu; 13(lower). Duyệt Thị đường; 14. Thiệu Phương garden; 14(green). Kitchen; 29. Ngự Tiền Văn phòng; 30. Lục Viện; 31. Nhật Thành Lâu.

=== Càn Thành Cung (乾成宮) ===
Càn Thành palace is the complex of building located inside purple forbidden city (chữ Hán: 紫禁城; Vietnamese: Tử Cấm thành). This was the residence and working office of the emperors as well as offices of the court mandarins. Most of them were destroyed in 1947 by Viet Minh.

==== Đại Cung môn (大宮門, Great gate of inner palace) ====
Đại Cung môn is the main gate to enter purple forbidden city built in 1833 with 3 doors, of which the main door is only for the Emperor. The facade was decorated with cloisonné enamel plaque with arts and famous poems. Currently, this gate has become a ruin due to being burned during the Viet Minh resistance campaign in February 1947.

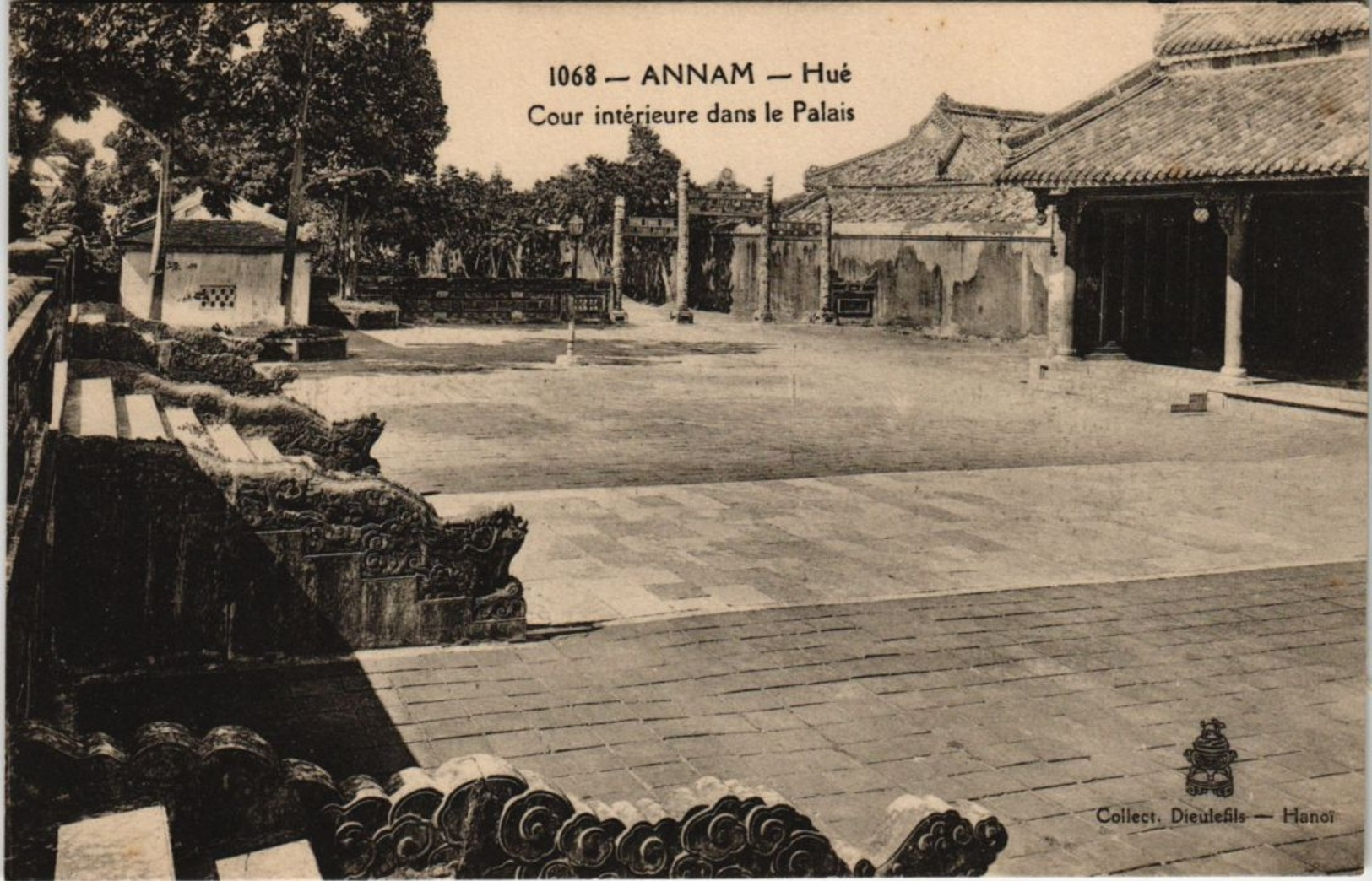
Đại Cung môn gate (left) and staircase of the north facade to Thai Hoa throne hall (right).

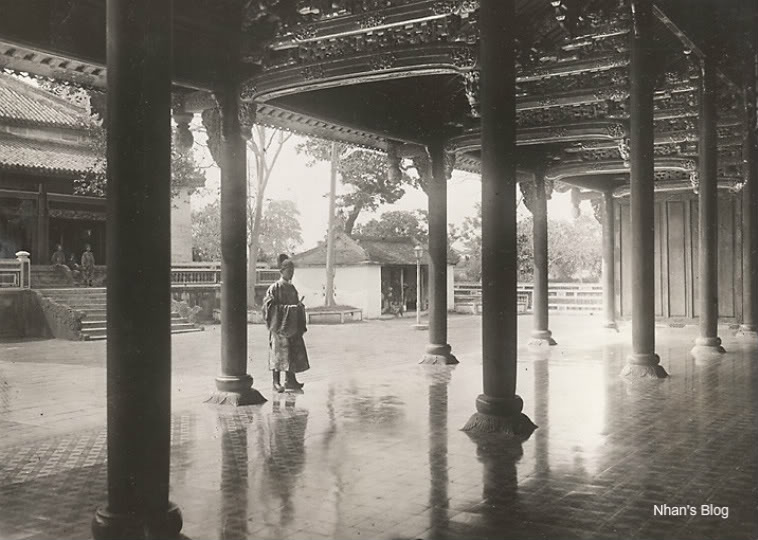
A court officials standing in front of the Đại Cung Môn.

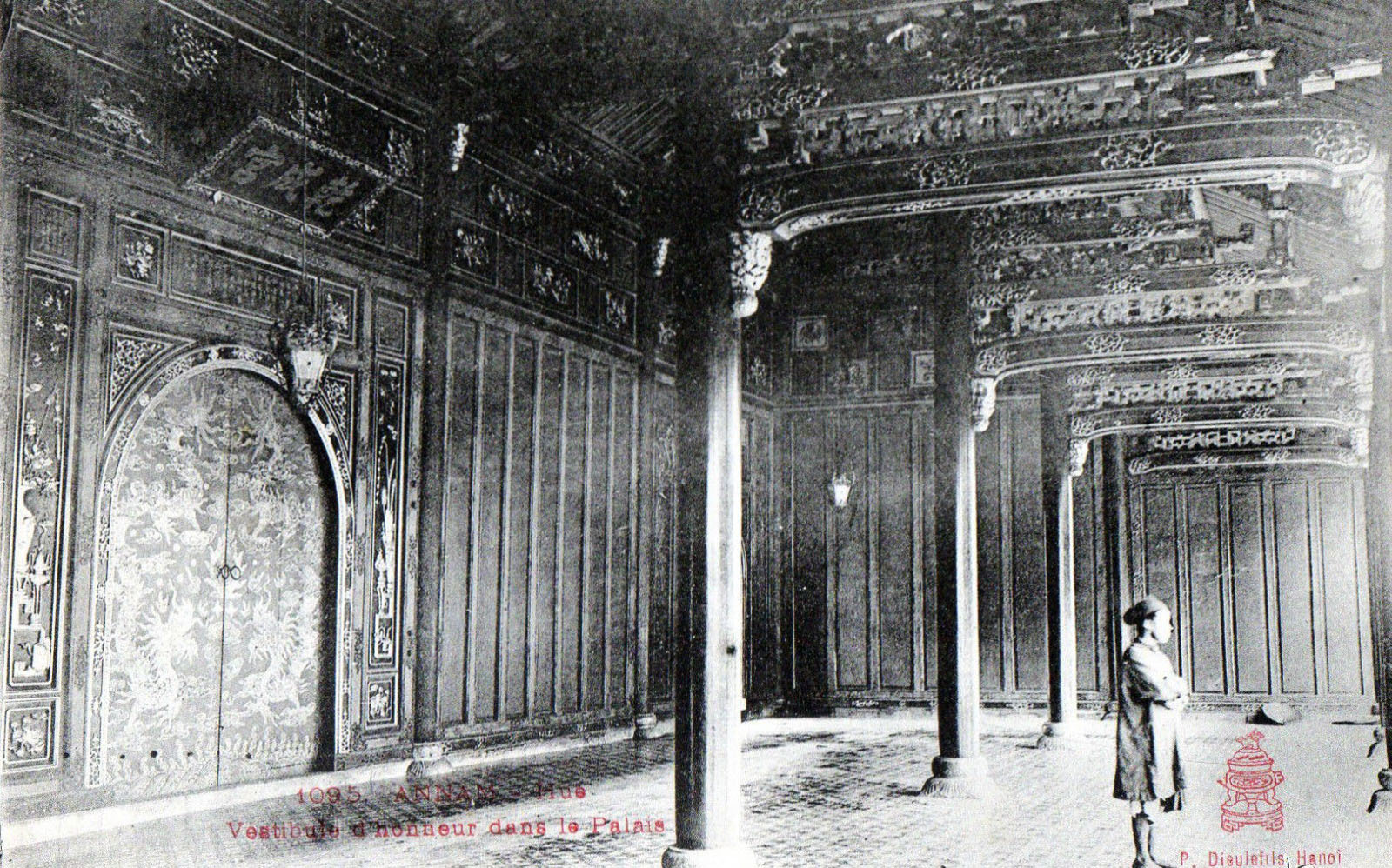
Đại Cung Môn from left side.

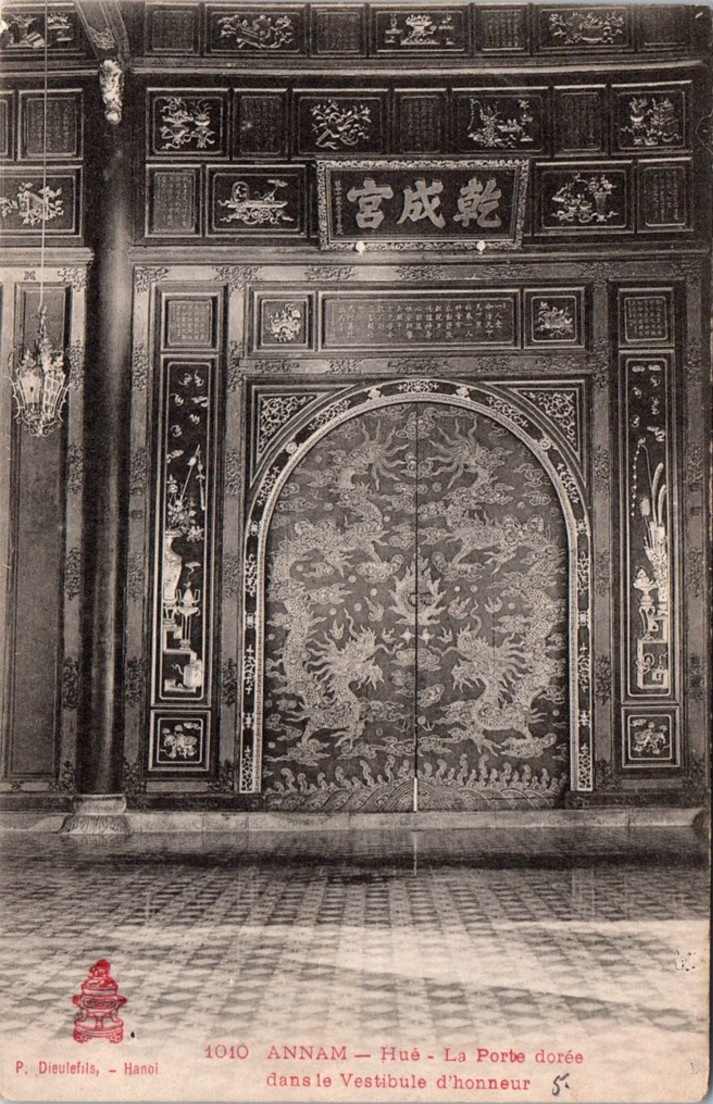
Đại Cung Môn (大宮門), the main gate to emperor's residence. The inscribed board on the top of gate with Chữ Hán from right to left : "乾成宮", Càn Thành Cung ( Càn Thành palace).

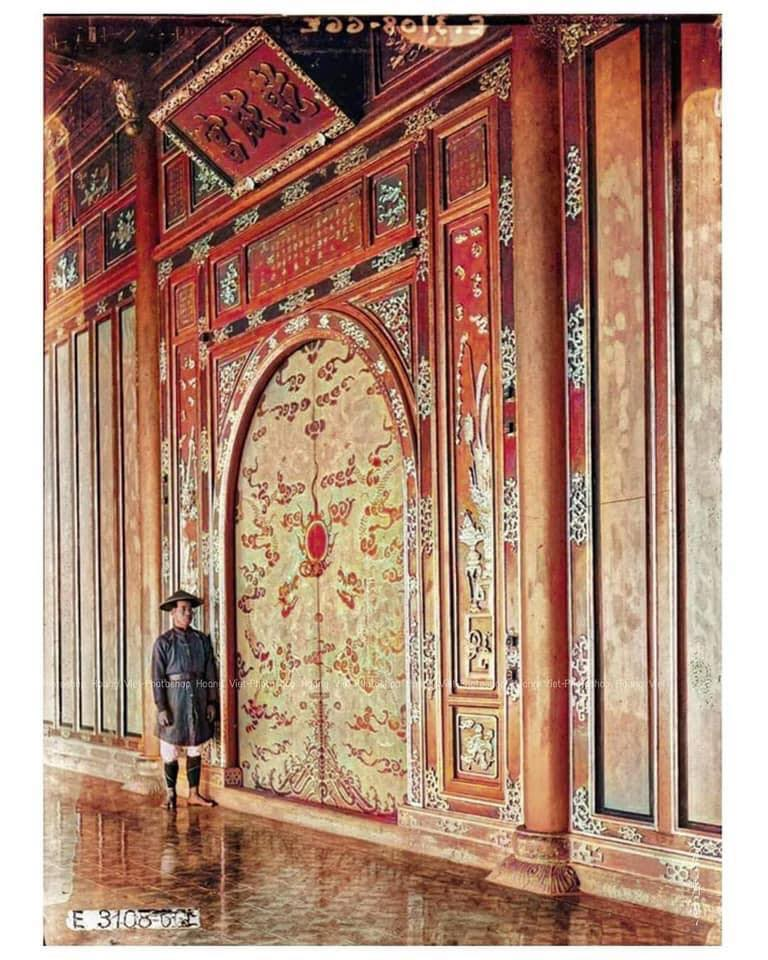
Imperial guard in front of the middle gate of the Đại Cung Môn, accessed only by the emperor

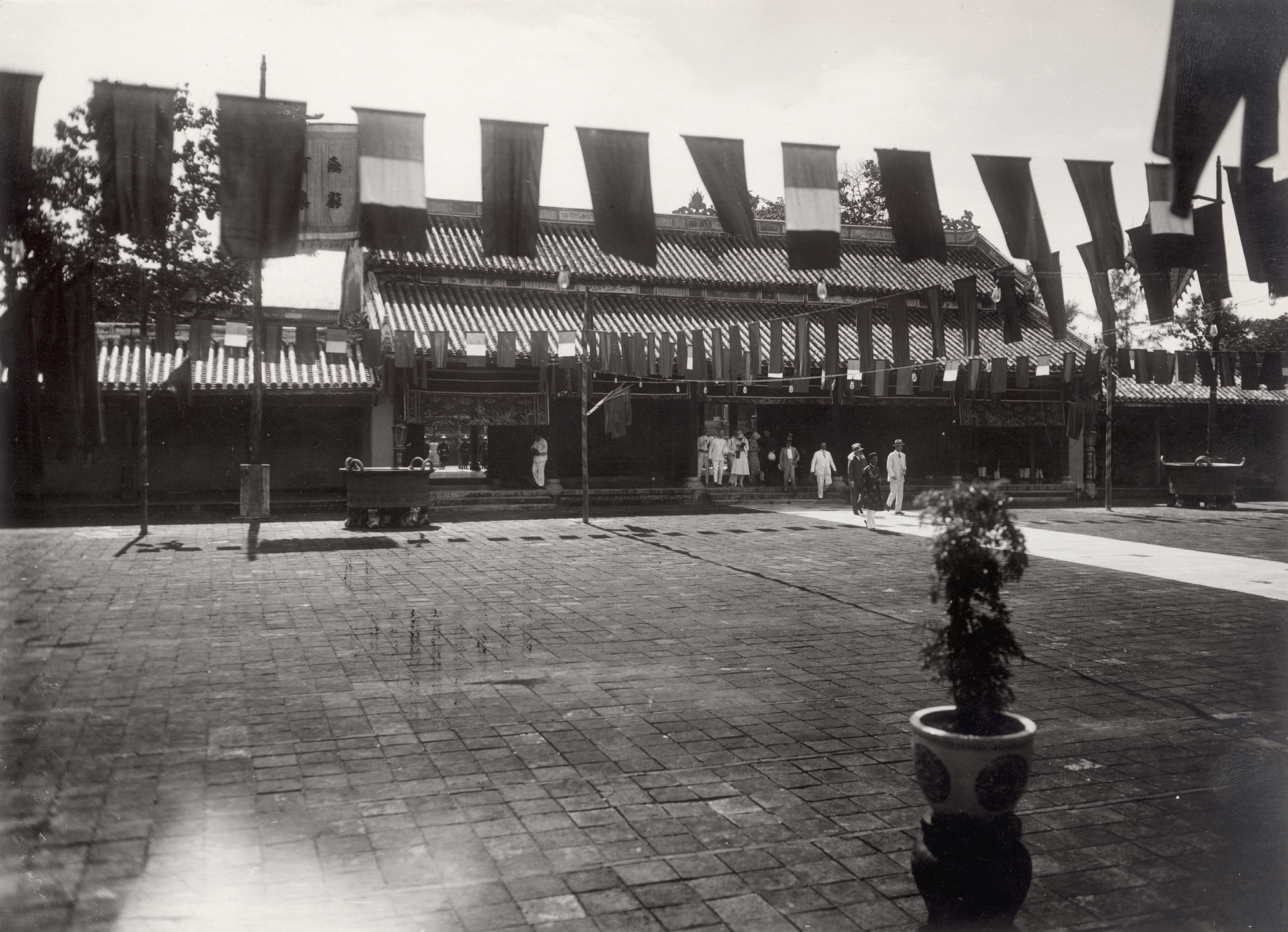
Back of the Đại Cung Môn

==== Tả Vu (左廡, Left hall) & Hữu Vu (右廡, Right hall) ====
Ta Vu and Huu Vu were both built in the 18th year of Gia Long (1819) where two buildings were attached to Cần Chánh hall in the Forbidden City. Tả Vu (左廡) is the building for civil mandarins, and Hữu Vu (右廡) is the building for military mandarins; this is where mandarins prepare rituals before holding court. Tả Vu was also used as office of Privy Council, hall of Final stage of imperial examinations (Thi Đình) and banquets were also held here.

Built in the early 19th century, the both building were repaired many times under the Nguyen emperors. Especially under the reign of emperor Khải Định (in 1923), Ta Vu and Huu Vu were renovated with major changes in structure, materials, decoration forms. During the renovation process, although the construction technology was influenced by European style with the ceiling replaced with concrete and the floor tiled, the original structural shape was still retained. In particular, the walls and ceilings were decorated and painted in European style with motifs expressing traditional themes of the Hue royal court.

The Privy Council was originally located in the Tả Vu until 1885, it was moved to the office of the Ministry of Rites, then the Ministry of War, and finally in 1903, it moved to the Giac Hoang Pagoda grounds which is current location.

The building was renovated twice in the 10th year of Thanh Thai (1899). In 1923, in preparation for the 40th birthday ceremony of emperor Khai Dinh, the building was renovated again and has the scale and architectural shape as it is today. During the war, Both buildings were seriously degraded and were restored in 1977, 1986, 1997–1999.

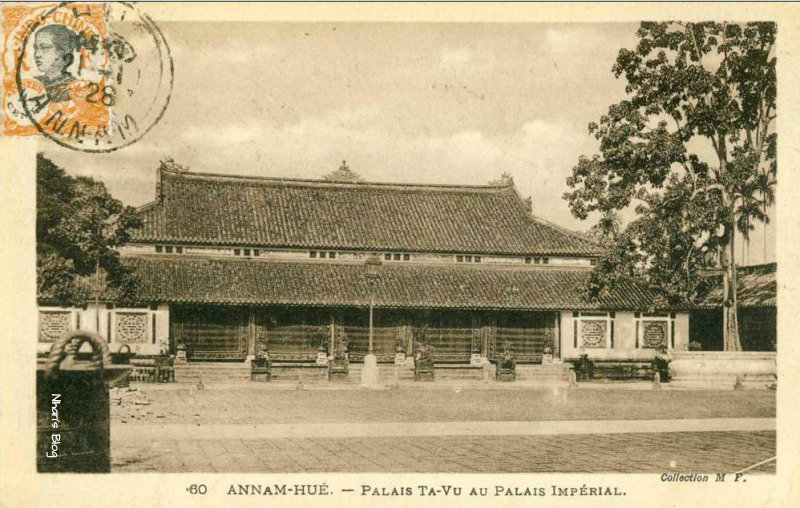
Right Hall - Hữu Vu (右廡), lobby hall of military officials before meeting with the emperor.

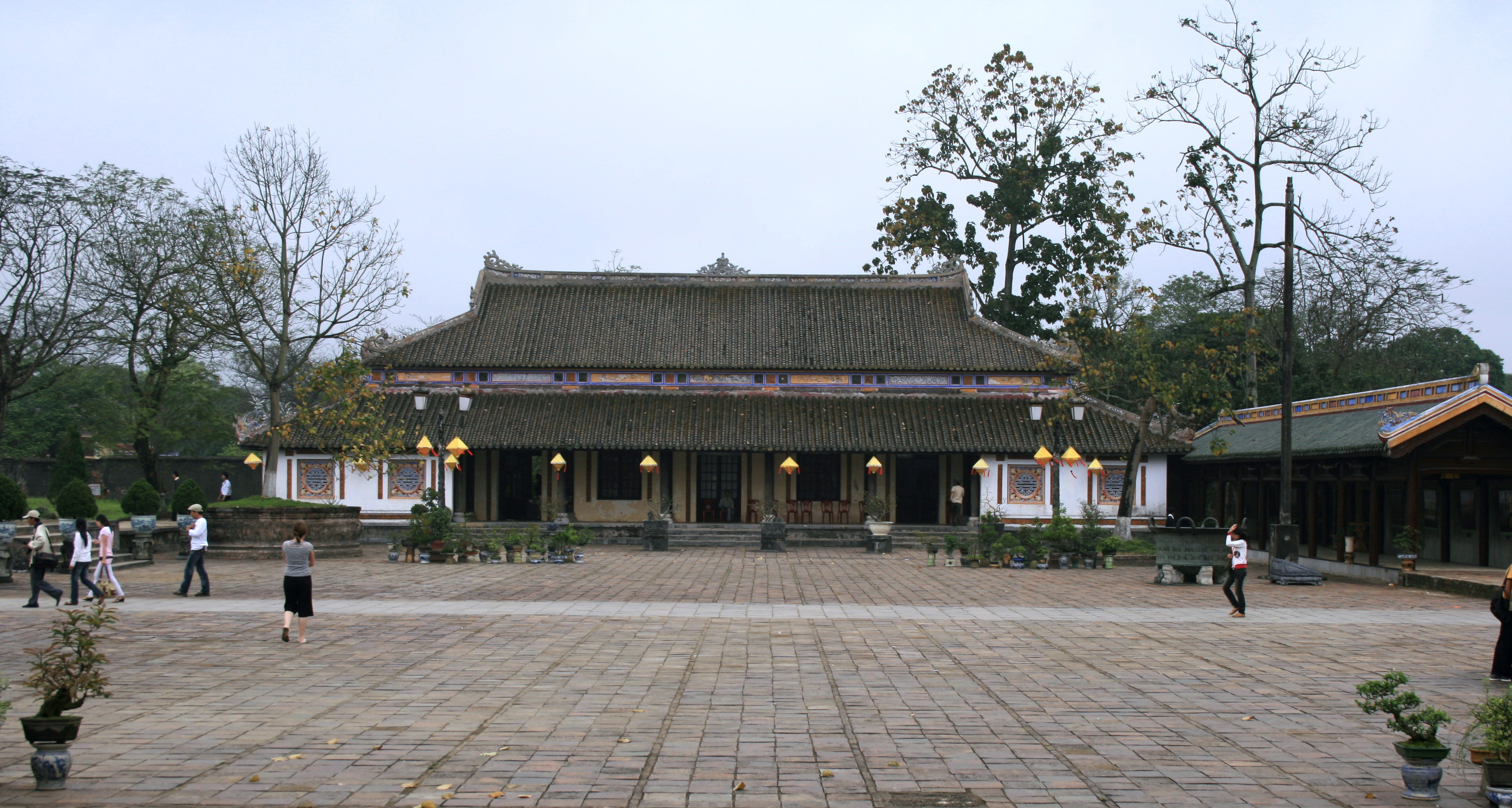
Left Hall -Tả Vu (左廡), lobby hall of civil officials before meeting with the emperor.

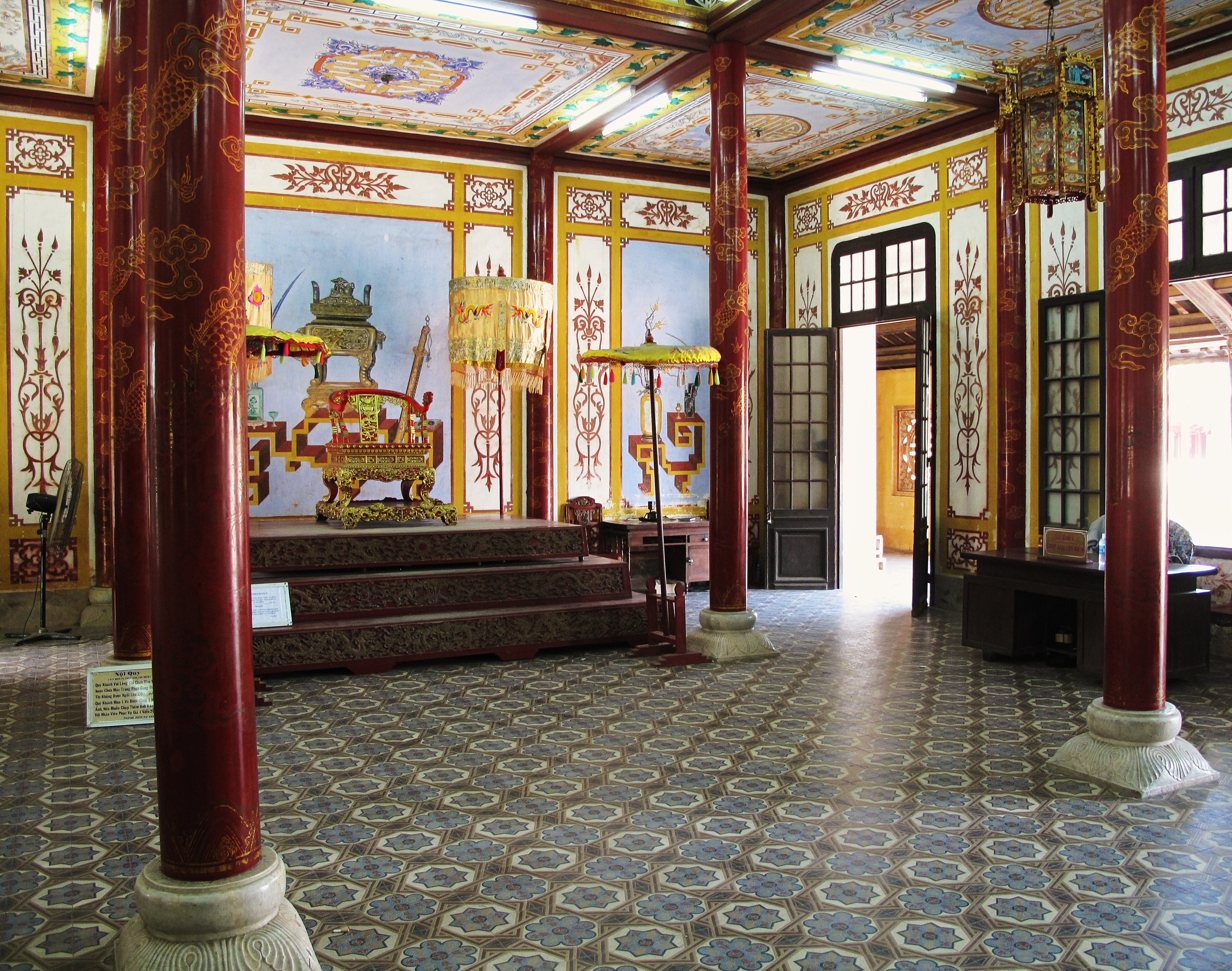
Interior and Replica of the Throne inside Hữu Vu

==== Đông Các Điện (東閣殿, Hall of Đông Các) ====
It was built in 7th year of Ming Mạng (1826) behind Ta Vu building to store the imperial documents and archives. It was also called Thư viện Nội Các (書院内閣), managed by Grand Secretariat of Đông Các (Đông Các Đại học sĩ, 東閣大學士). The upper-floor was used to store the documents such as:

- All treaty signed with foreign countries.
- Diplomatic letters received from foreign countries.
- Emperors's poems.
- The map of Vietnam and the other countries.
- The other precious and historical archives.
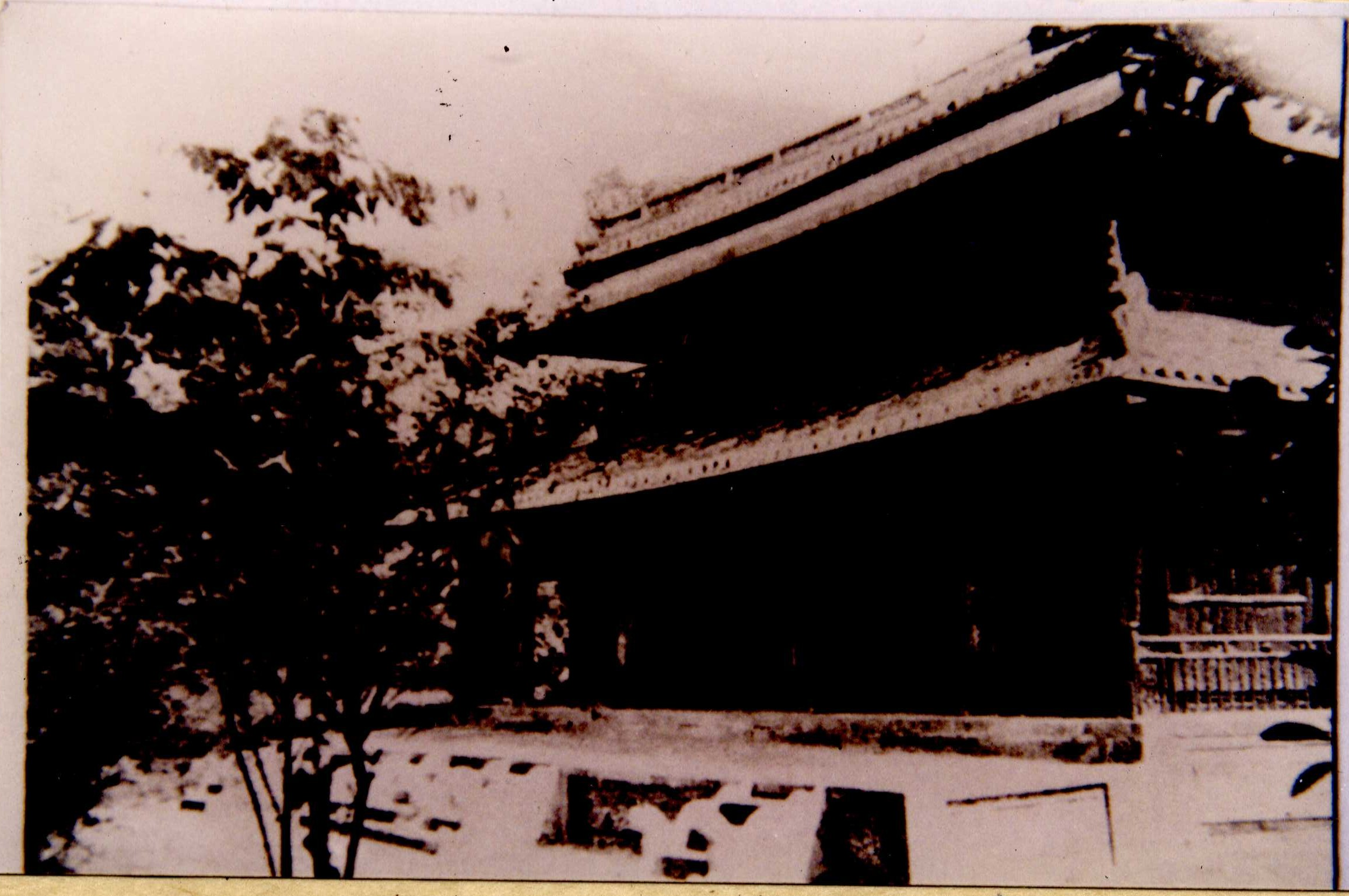
Đông Các Hall, 1942

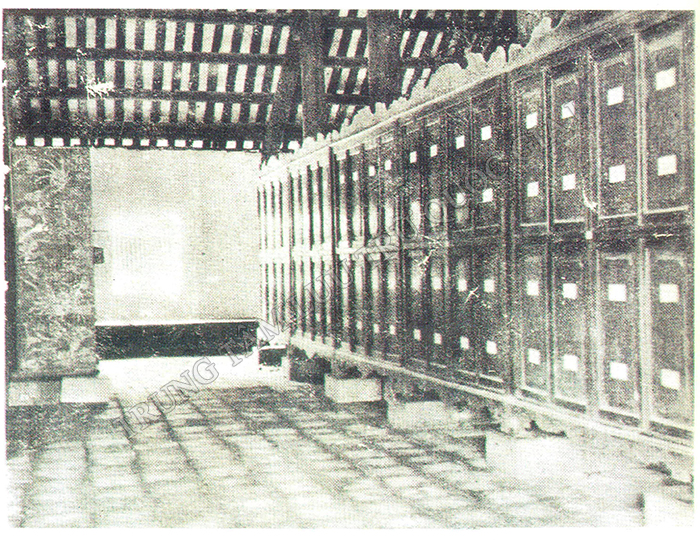
Book shelves inside of the Đông Các Hall

It was destroyed by Viet Minh in 1947.

==== Cần Chánh Điện (勤政殿, Hall of Cần Chánh) ====
It was the working office of emperor built in 1804, rebuilt in 1827, 1850, 1899 where the emperor held daily court, working, received diplomatic envoys, and held royal and court banquets of the Nguyễn dynasty. The emperor will hold the court meeting in 5th, 10th, 20th and 25th day of every lunar month. In the middle of the main house, the Sập is placed. On the columns on both sides are hung mirror paintings showing the beautiful scenery of the capital and maps of the provinces in the country. The palace is also a place to display many treasures of the Nguyen dynasty such as rare Vietnamese porcelain, golden and jade royal seal of the dynasty. The building was built by traditional Vietnamese style "Trùng thiềm điệp ốc" (重簷叠屋) and the interior was decorated similar to Thái Hòa hall which is "Nhất Thi Nhất Họa" (一詩一畫) which means "one poem, one painting". Currently, this palace had become a ruin due to being burned during the Viet Minh resistance campaign in February 1947.

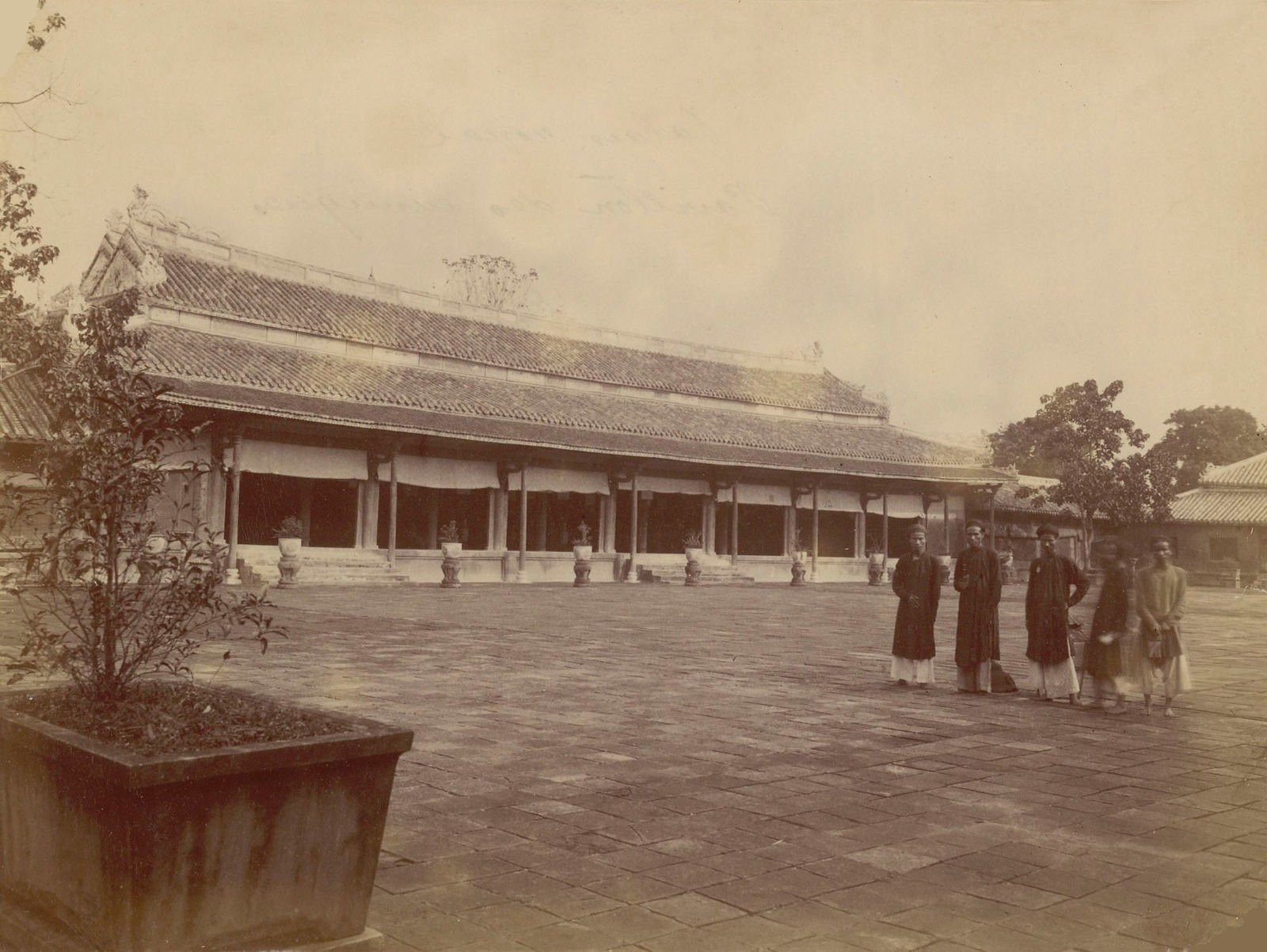
Eunuchs in front of Cần Chánh Hall in 1892

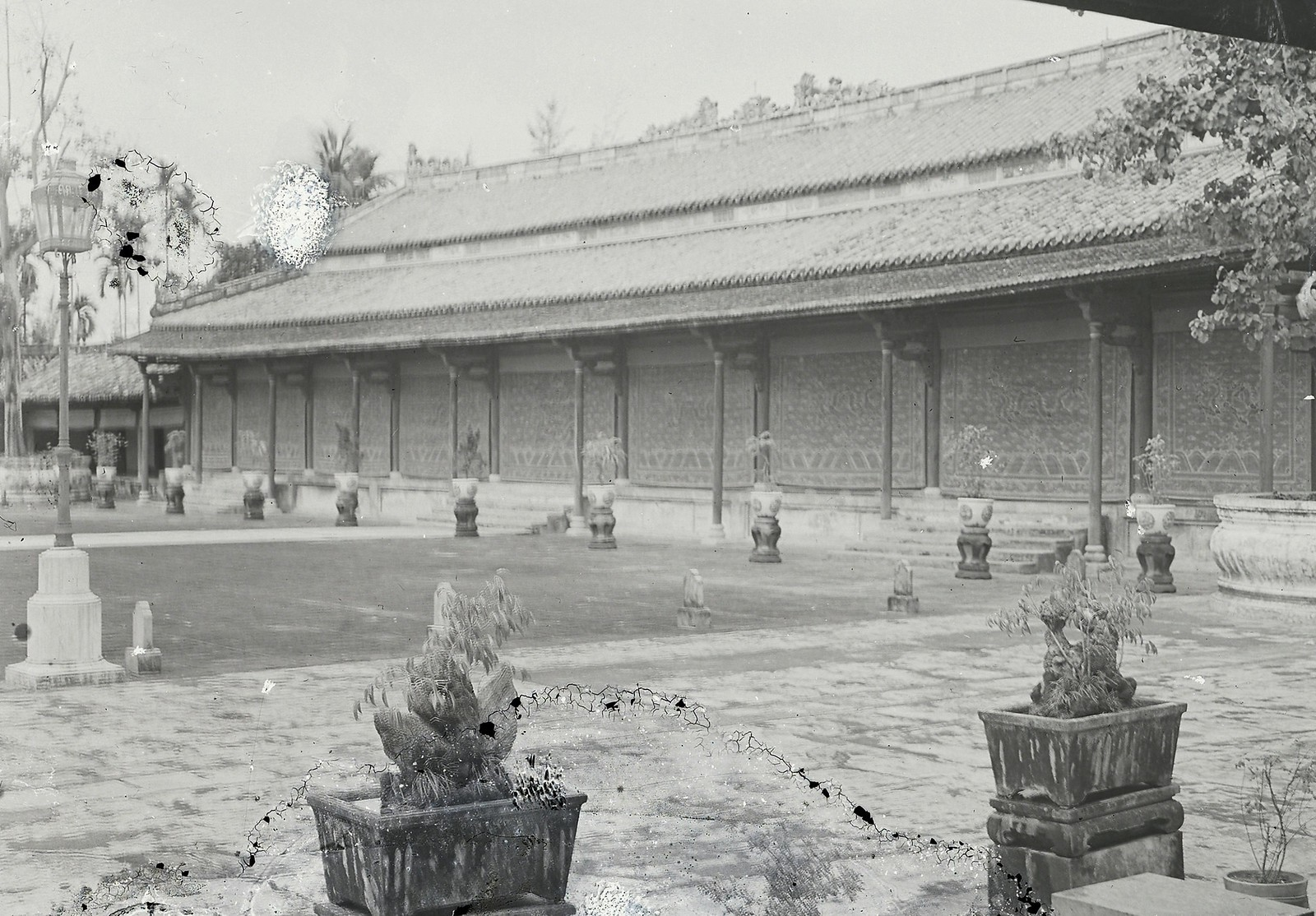
Facade of the Hall, 1920s.

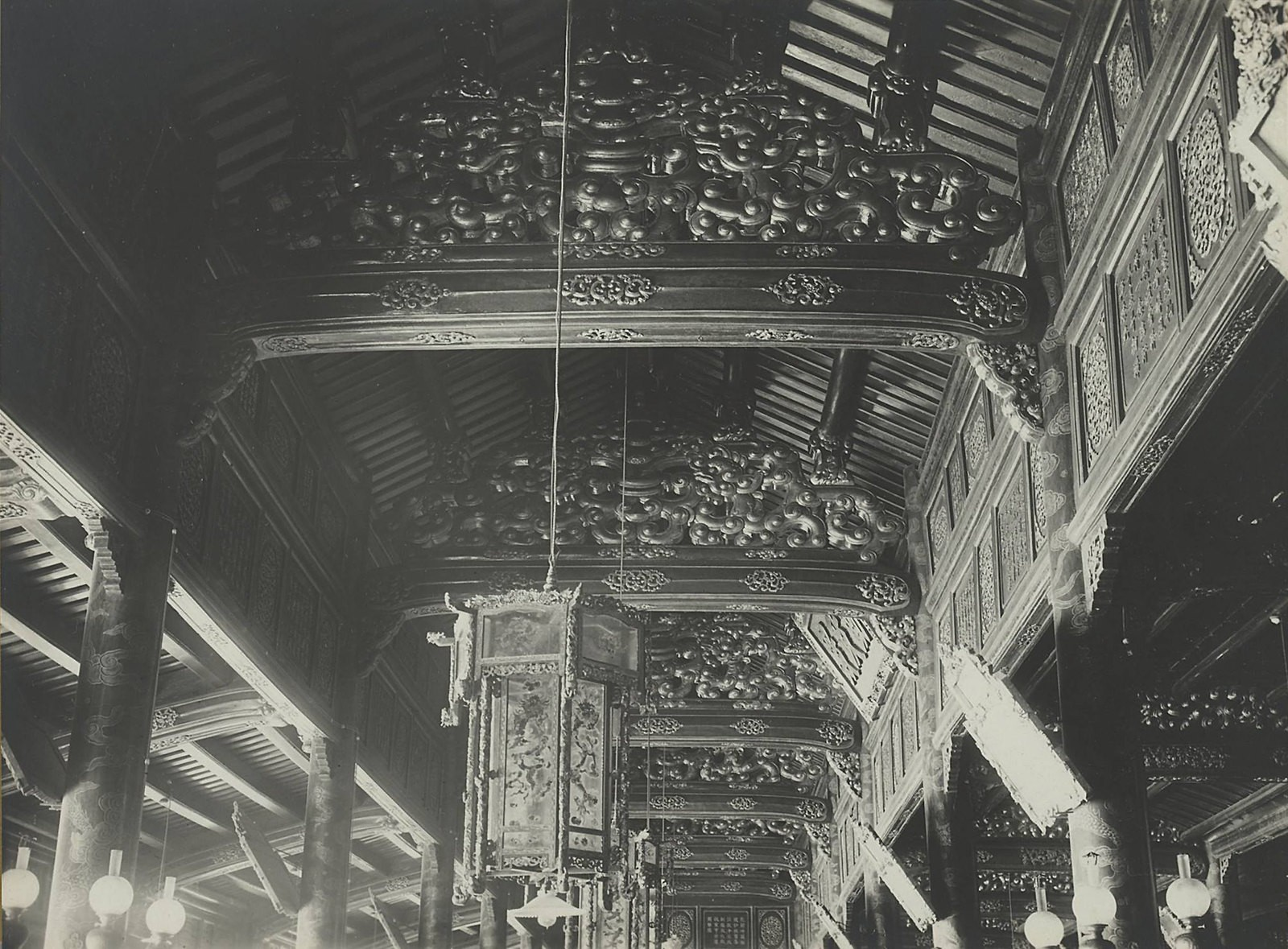
Ceiling of the Cần Chánh Hall.

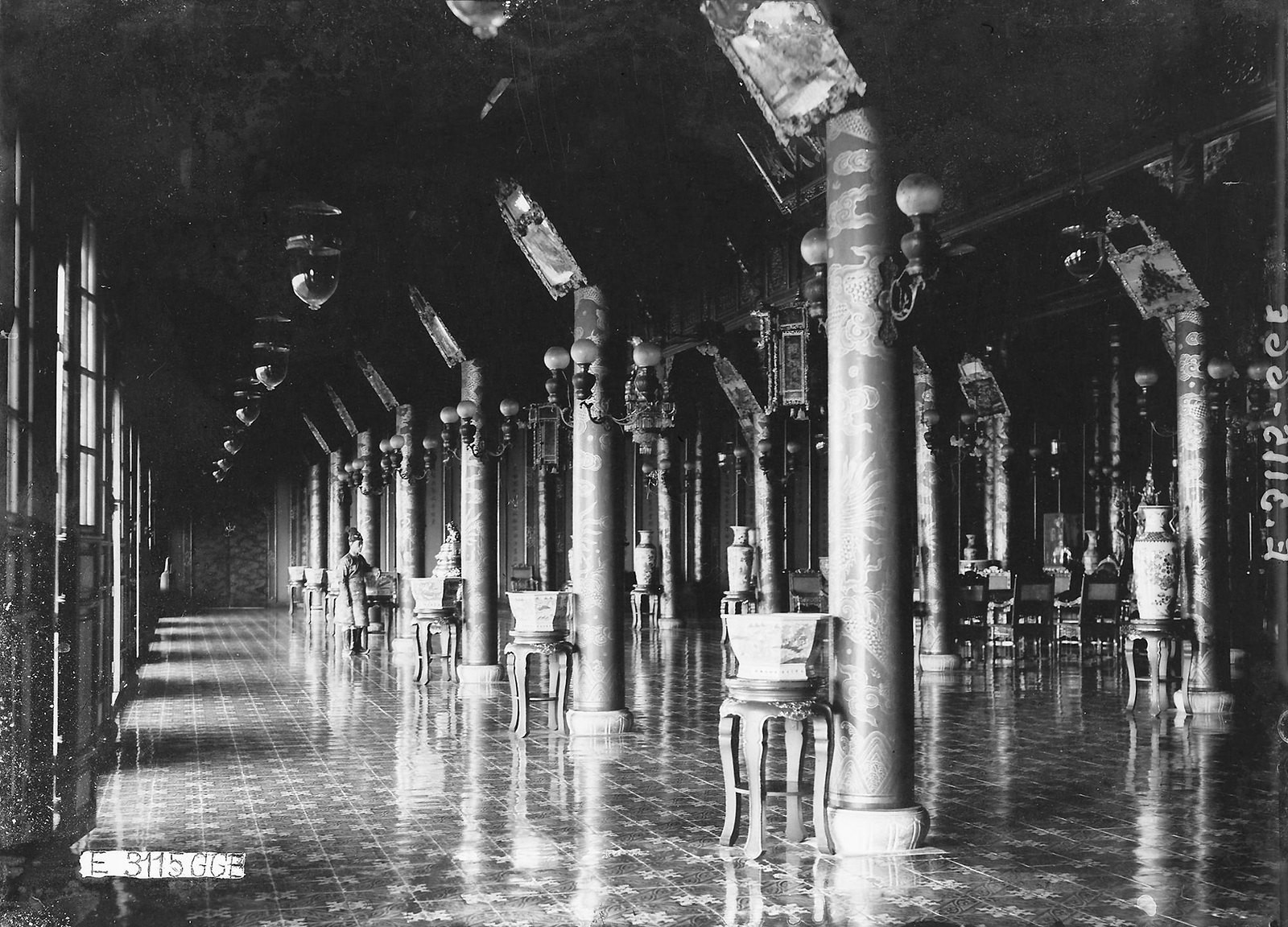
Interior of the Cần Chánh Hall.

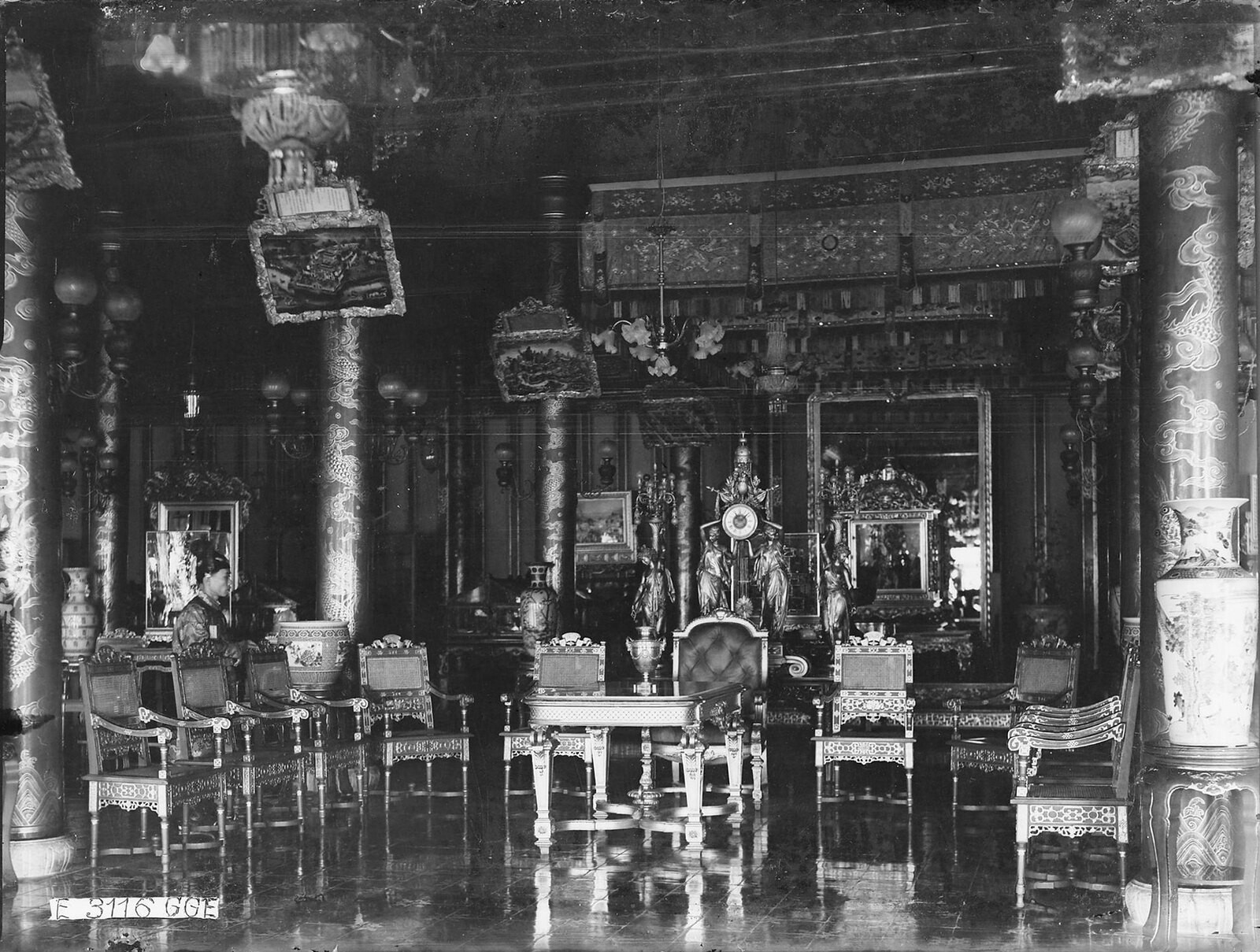
Decor inside the Hall during Khải Định era.

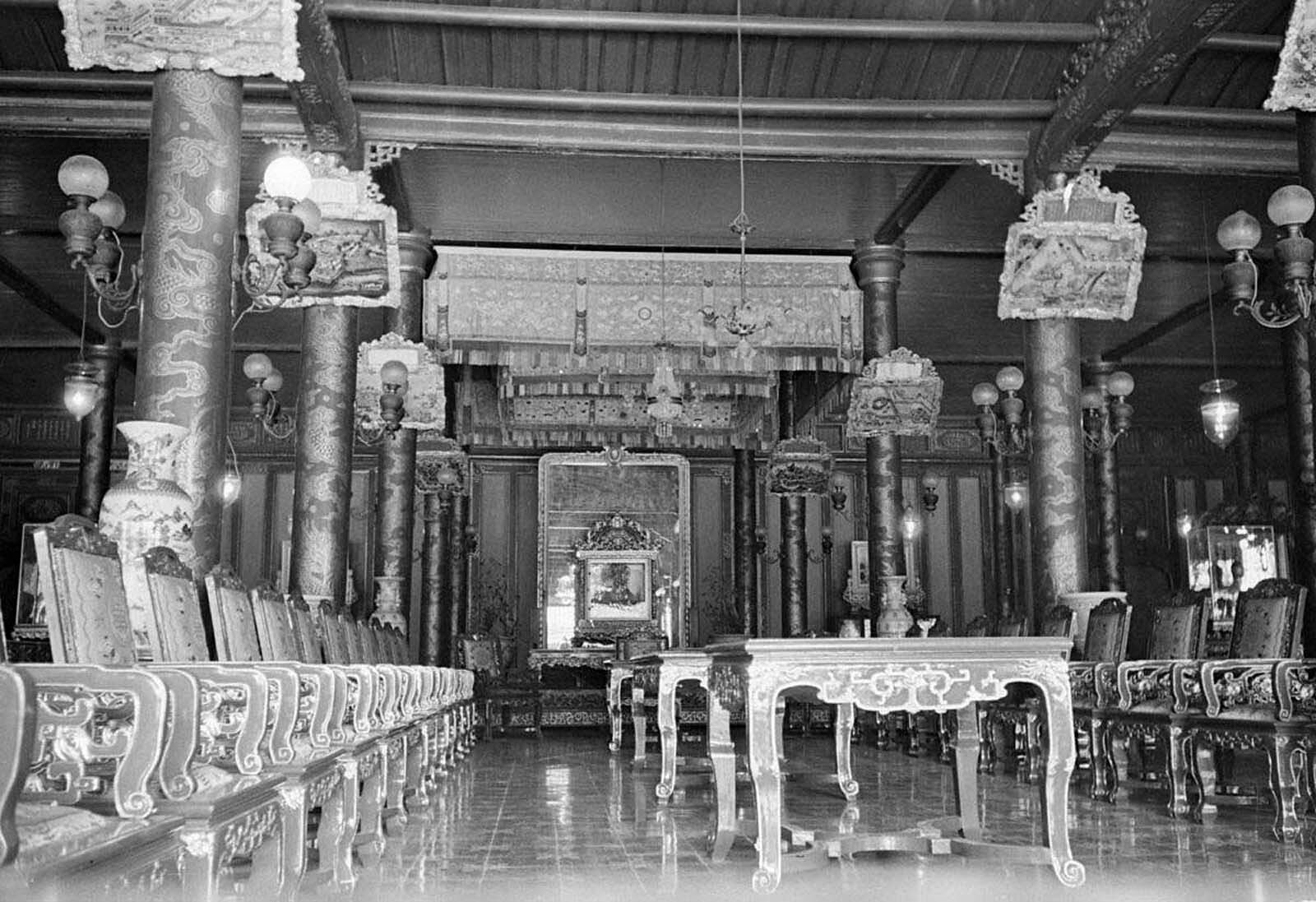
Decor inside the Hall during Khải Định era.

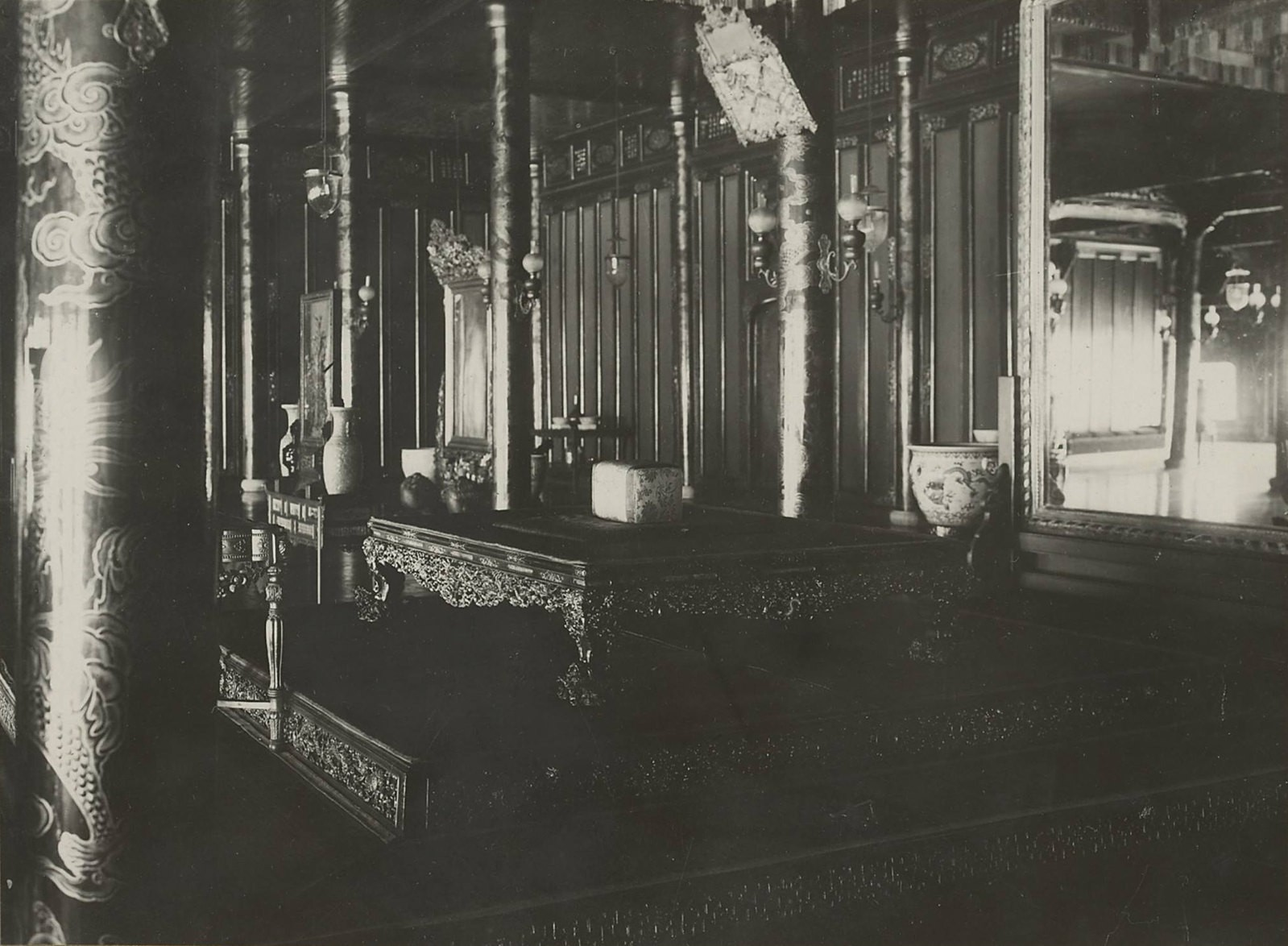
Sập, a form of Vietnamese traditional furniture, seen inside the Hall.

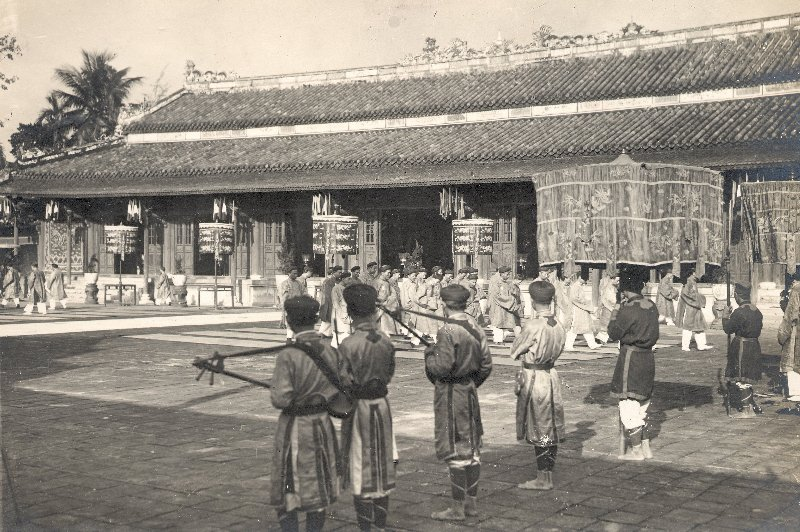
The Hall of Cần Chánh in coronation date of Emperor Bảo Đại (1926).

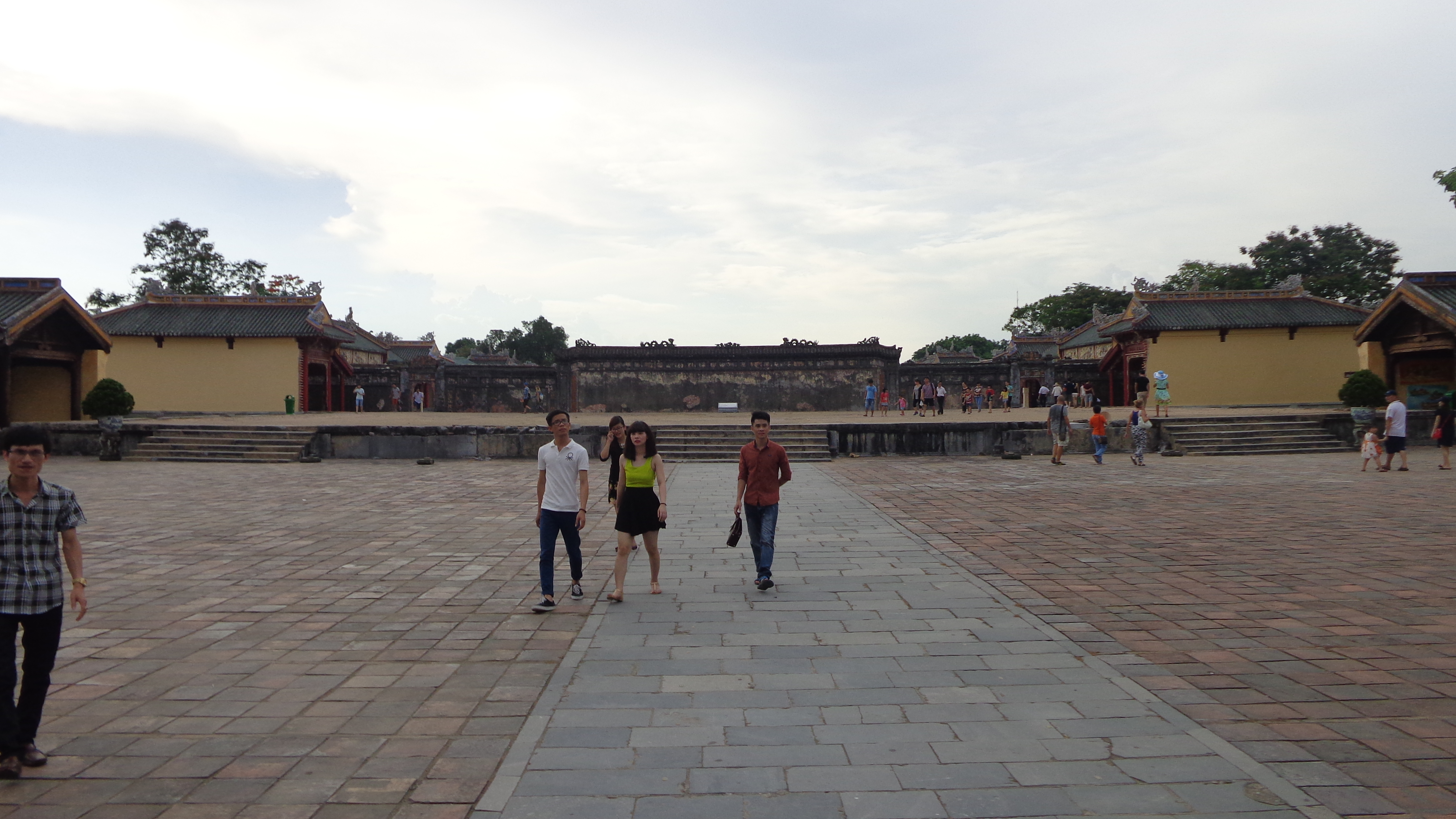
What remains today of the building.

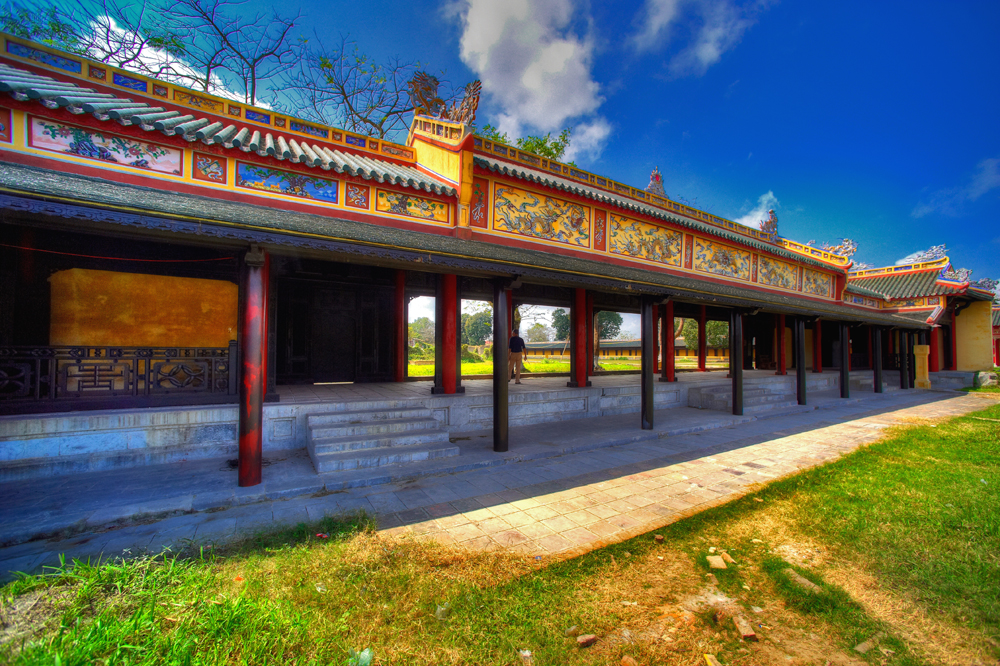
Long Corridor (Trường lang, 長廊).

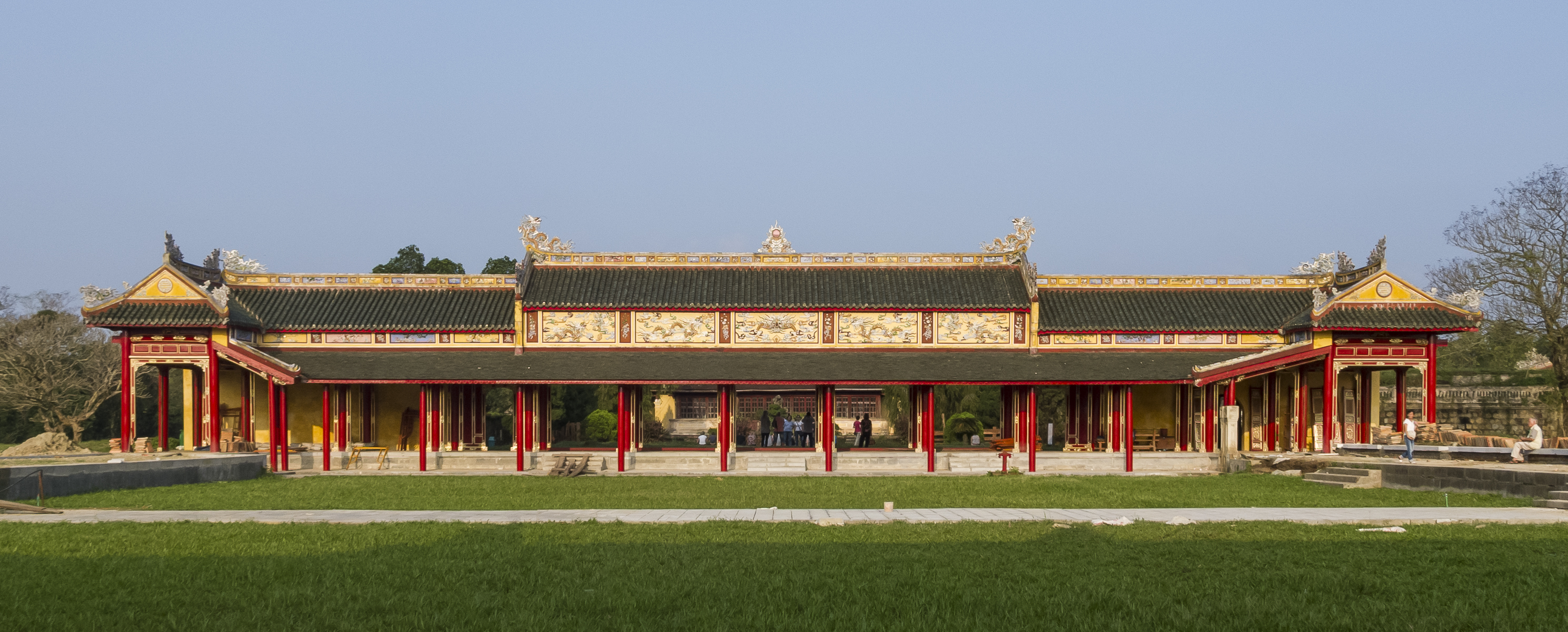
Long Corridor (Trường lang, 長廊).

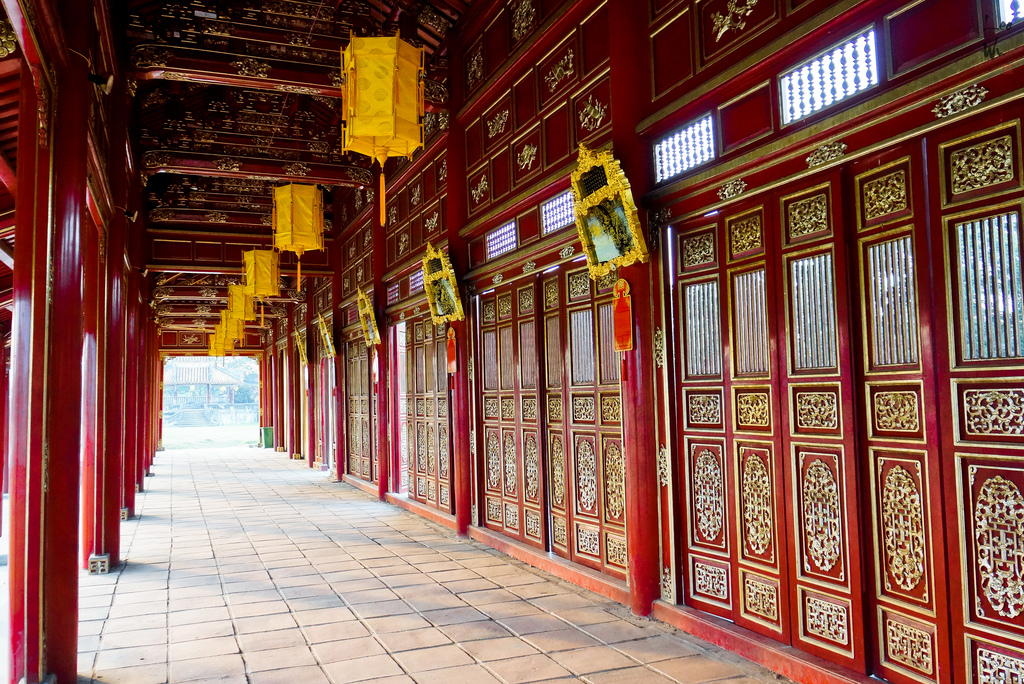
Long Corridor (Trường lang, 長廊).

==== Võ Hiển Điện (武顯殿, Hall of Võ Hiển) ====
Working place of martial mandarins, next to Right hall (Hữu Vu), destroyed in 1947 by Viet Minh. It was used by emperor Kiến Phúc as Kinh Diên Viện (經筵院), the study room of learning Historical documents such as Chinese Four Books and Five Classics and the other historical lesson.

==== Văn Minh Điện (文明殿, Hall of Văn Minh) ====
Working place of civil mandarins, next to Left Hall (Tả Vu), destroyed in 1947 by Viet Minh. Emperor Thành Thái, Duy Tân and Khải Định used the place as Kinh Diên Viện (經筵院), the study room of learning Historical documents such as Chinese Four Books and Five Classics and the court meeting place (The emperor only used Cần Chánh Hall for court meeting in case of important situations.).

==== Càn Thành Điện (乾成殿, Hall of Càn Thành) ====
The hall was built in 10th year of Gia Long (1811) with original name Trung Hòa Điện (中和殿), it gained the current name in 8th lunar month of 20th year of Ming Mạng (1839). This building was the living quarter of the Emperor until 1923 when it was moved to Kien Trung Palace. It was also used for private meeting with court mandarins. When the Emperor died, his coffin would be enshrined here before moving to mausoleum. Càn Thành hall was also used to store many treasures such as rare porcelain items as well as royal seals made of gold and jade; royal metal books; a casket containing a golden royal genealogy; national history books; official dispatches, documents; maps. This palace was destroyed during the Viet Minh resistance campaign in February 1947.

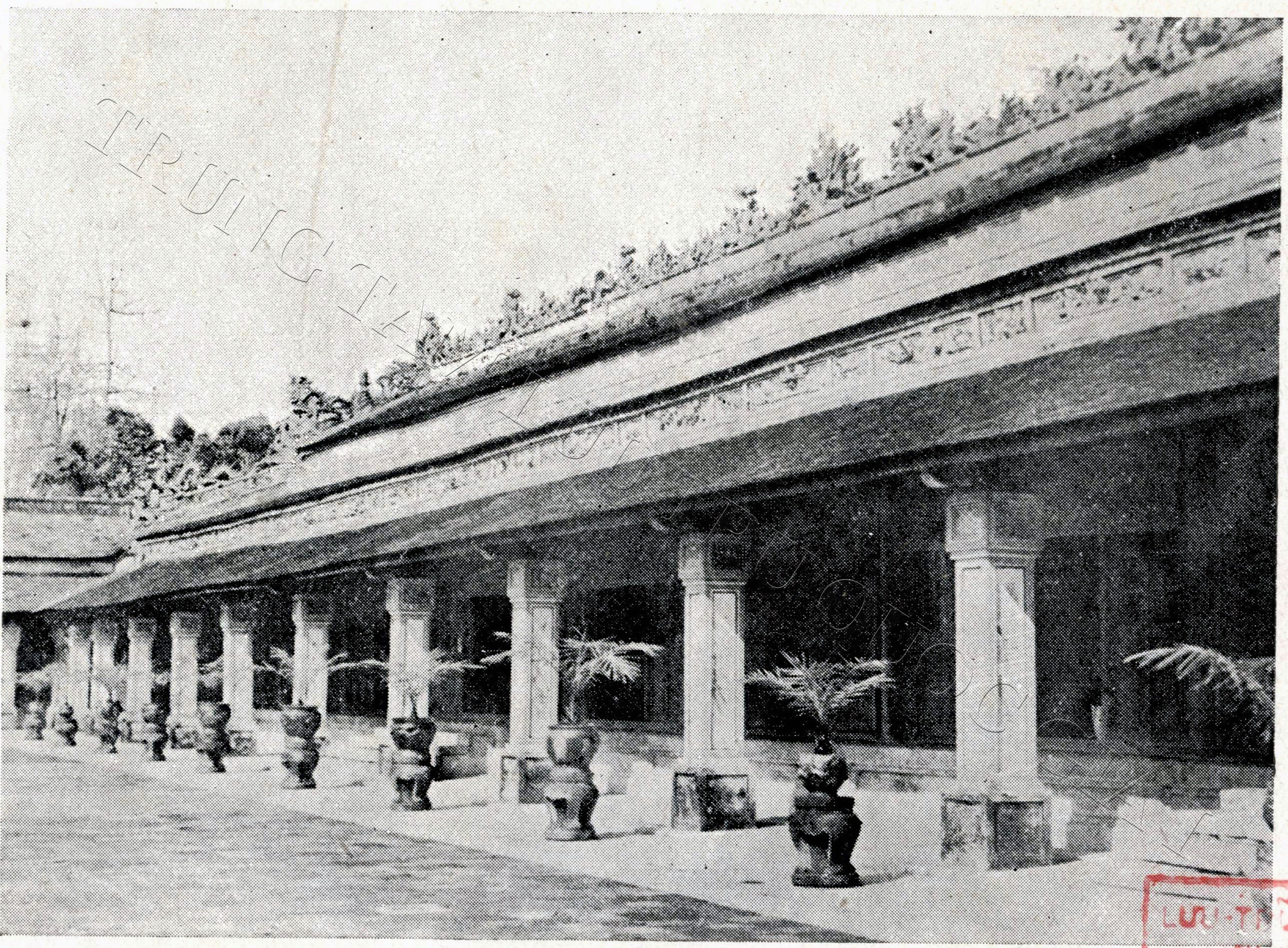
Front of the Càn Thành Hall,1942.

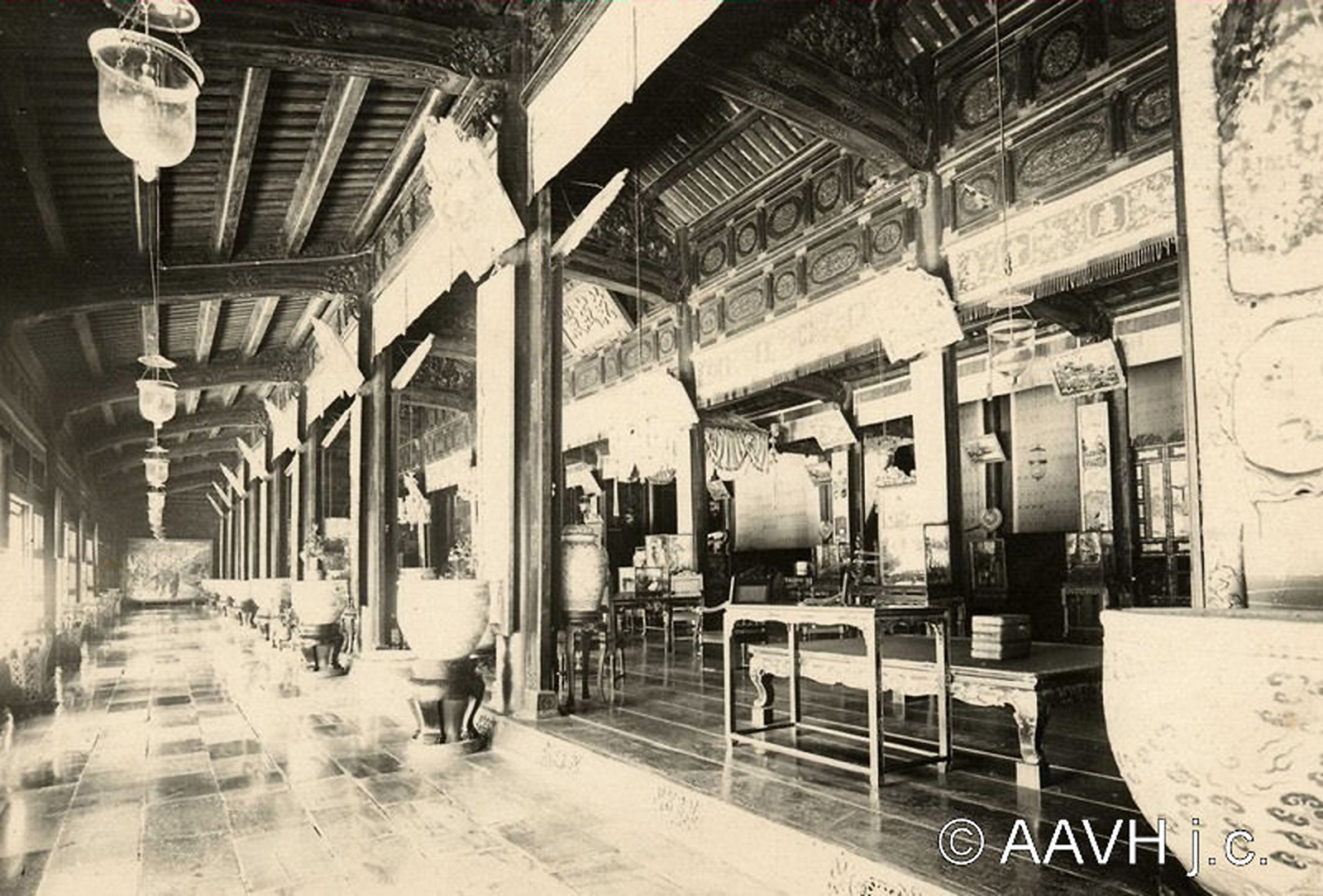
Interior of the Càn Thành Hall.

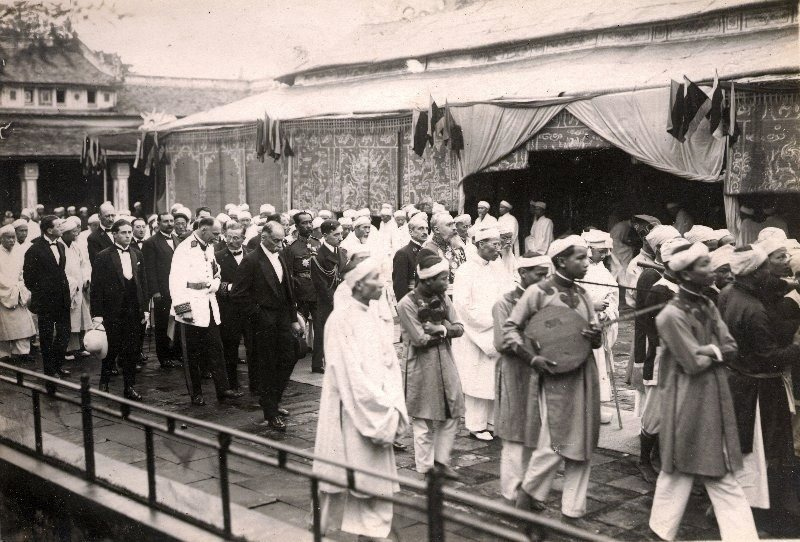
Funeral of Emperor Khải Định, from the Càn Thành Hall to the mausoleum.

==== Quang Minh Điện (光明殿, Hall of Quang Minh) ====
It is located on the right side of Hall of Càn Thành, used as the residence of crown prince.

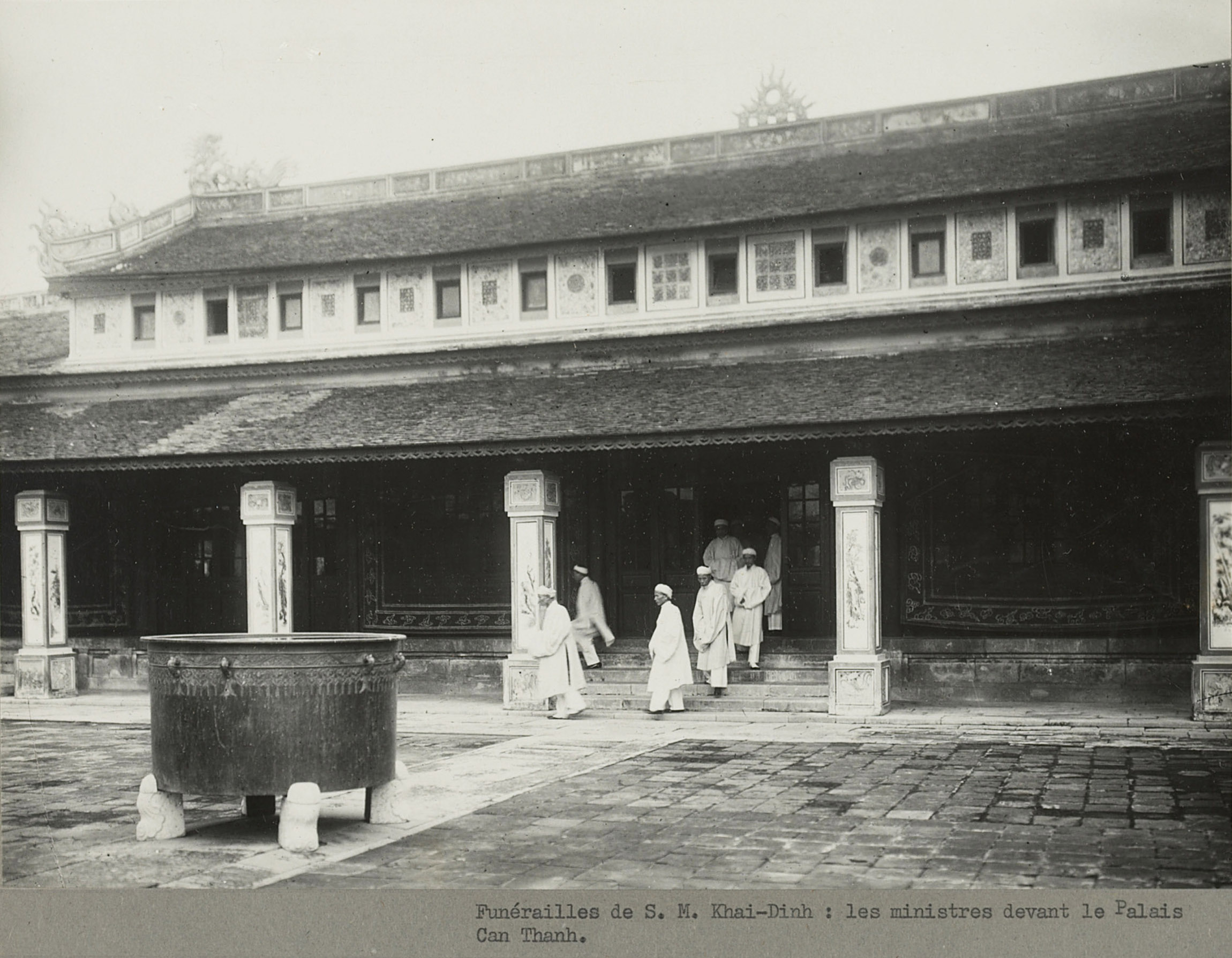
Court officials in mourning dress during the funeral of Emperor Khải Định going out of the Hall, 1925.

==== Trinh Minh Điện (貞明殿, Hall of Trinh Minh) ====
it was built in Gia long 's era (1802–1820) on the left side of Hall of Càn Thành and used as residence of first (Nhất giai Phi, 一階妃) and second rank concubines (Nhị giai Phi, 二階妃).

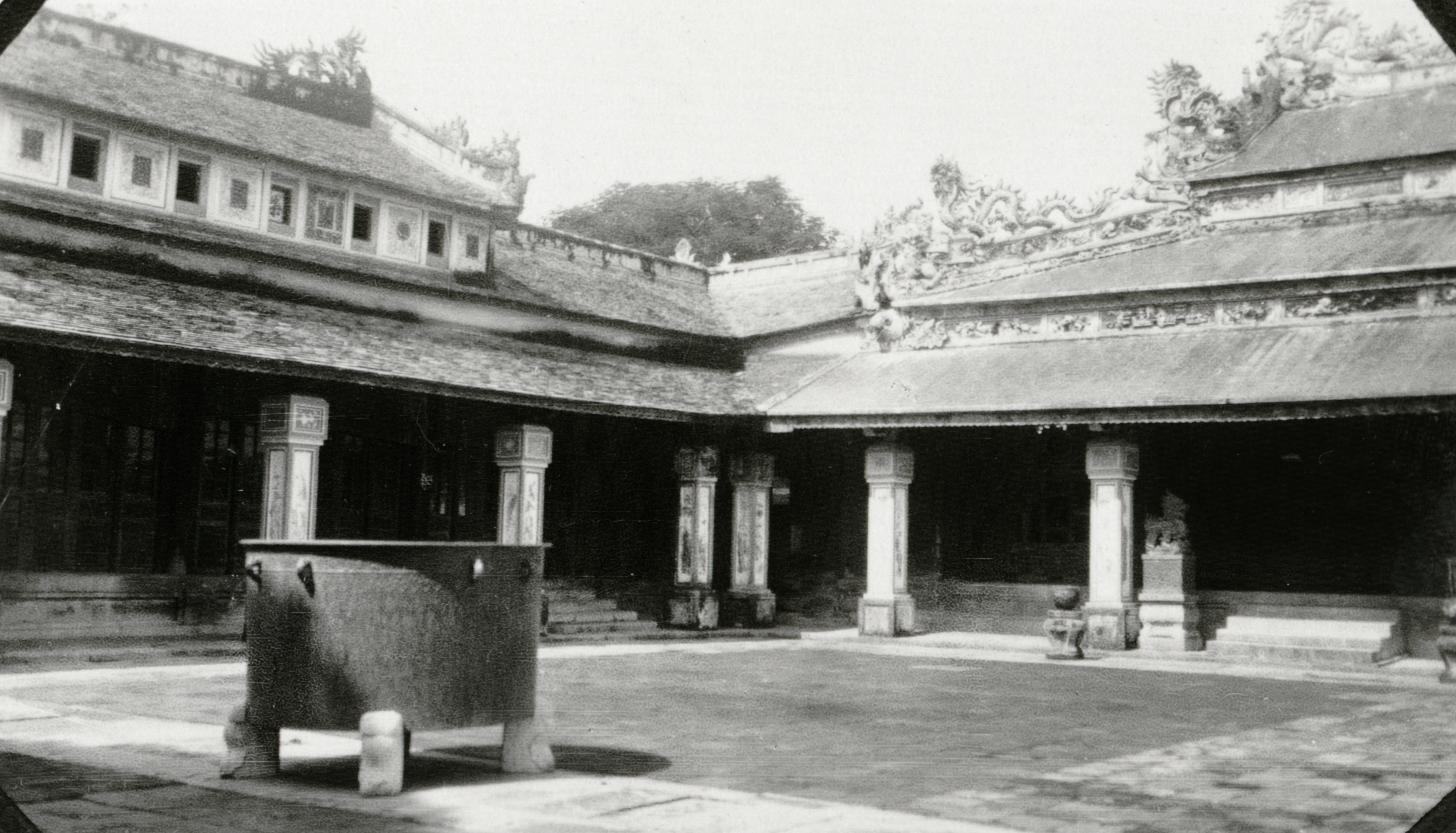
Hall of Trinh Minh (left) next to the Hall of Càn Thành

=== Khôn Thái Cung (坤泰宮, Khôn Thái palace) ===
This is the main residence of the Empress consort of the Nguyễn dynasty (demolished in Khai Dinh's era to make space for Kien Trung palace's front garden. The main building of the palace is the hall of Cao Minh Trung Chính (高明中政殿) built in 1804 where Empress consort conducted her daily life.

==== Dưỡng Tâm điện (養心殿) ====
it is located on the right side of hall of Cao Minh Trung Chính, built in 9th year of Gia Long (1810) and used as residence for princesses. Later it was used by emperor's reading room.

==== Kiến Trung Điện (建忠殿) ====
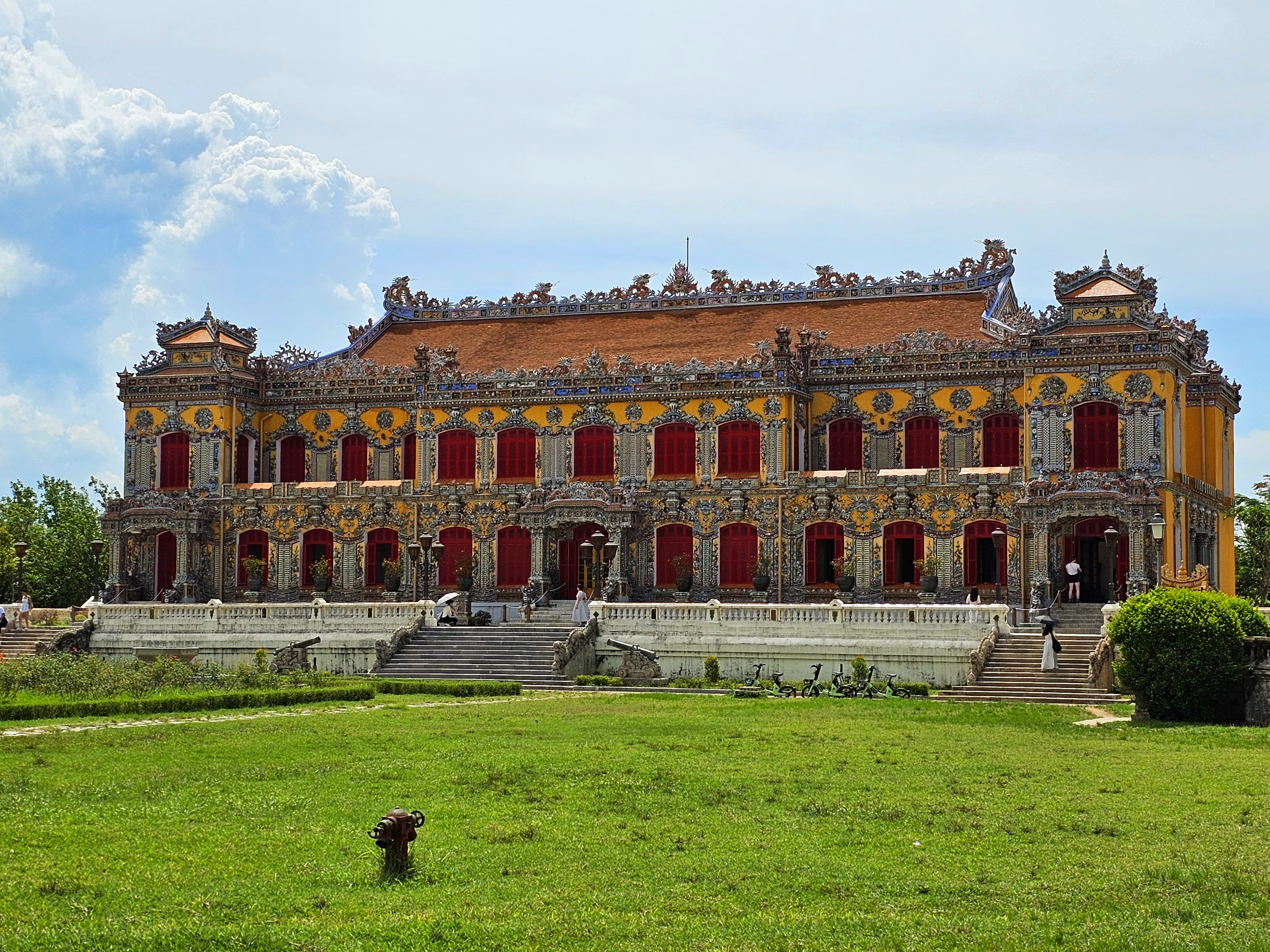
Kiến Trung Điện (2025)

Kien Trung hall is a new residence building of the Nguyễn dynasty in the Forbidden City (Hue) built by Emperor Khải Định from 1921 to 1923 at the same time as his tomb was built to serve as the emperor's living space in the royal palace. It was later also the place where his son - Emperor Bảo Đại and the imperial family lived and worked. Besides that, it was the main workplace of the court until the dynasty ended in August 1945. Kien Trung Palace is located at the northernmost point of the axis running through the center of the Forbidden City. The style of the palace is a fusion of European styles including French architecture, Italian Renaissance architecture, and traditional Vietnamese architecture. The facade of the palace is decorated with colorful ceramic pieces. In front of the palace is a landscape garden, with three dragon-covered stairs leading up to the palace steps. The main floor has 13 porch doors: the middle compartment has 5 doors, the two side compartments each have 3 doors, the two corners of the palace have two more doors on each side that protrude completely. The upper floor is the attic, made in the same format as the main floor. On top is a tiled roof with railings decorated in Vietnamese style.

==== Duyệt Thị đường (閲是堂) ====
The Imperial theatre was built in 7th year of Ming Mạng (1824–1826) on the ground of former theatre Thanh Phong Đường(青豊堂). It was used to host some special events of imperial courts like emperor's birthday. Tuồng and court music (Nhã nhạc) was performed by here as the favorite of the imperial families. The current version of the theatre was rebuilt in the South Vietnam's era

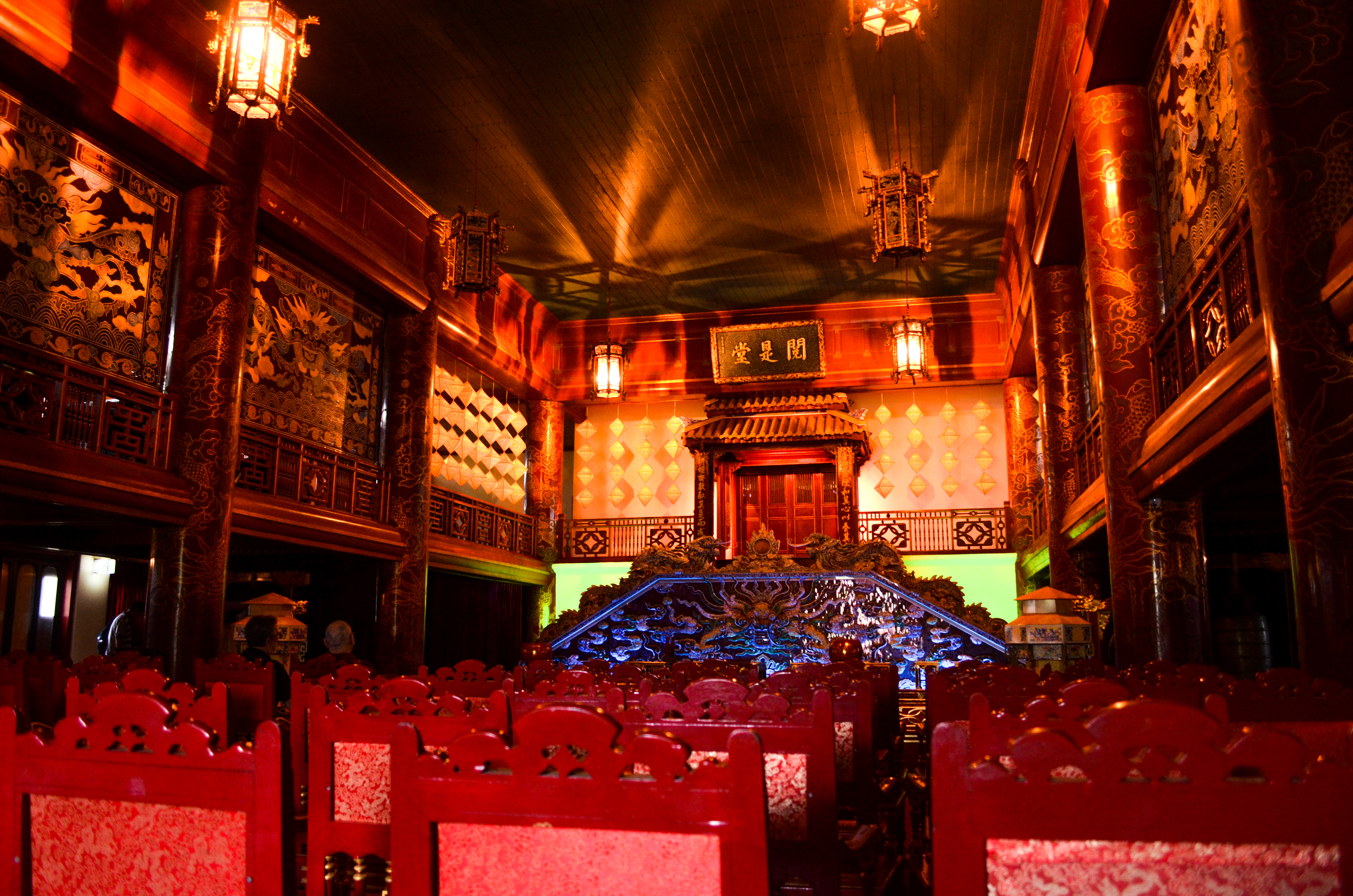
Inside of the theatre

==== Ngự Y viện (御醫院) or Thái y Viện (太醫院) ====
It was the working office of private doctors of emperor and imperial family members. It was founded in 1802 and finished in 1804. The department was responsible for health care in imperial palace as well as suggesting diet plans and recording documents of medicine with treatment process.

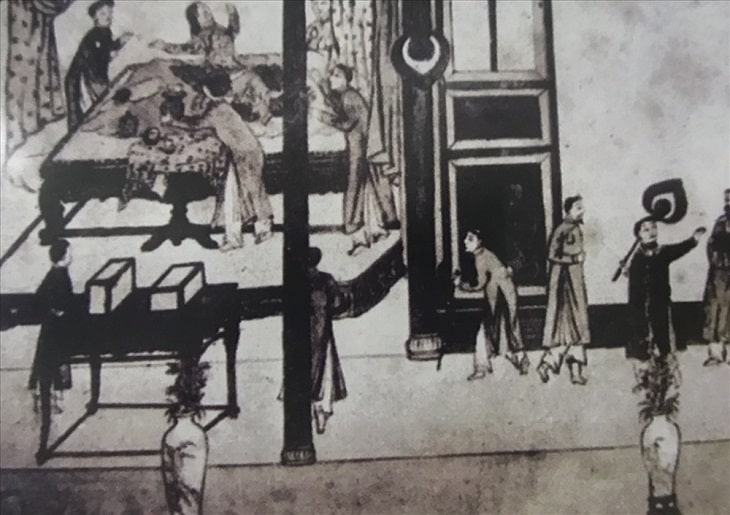
Doctors providing medical treatment to the Royal Family in the Thái Y Viện.

Seal of the Thái y Viện (Thái y viện quan phòng, 太醫院關防)

==== Thượng Thiện sở (尚膳所) (Royal Kitchen) ====
Imperial kitchen responsible for imperial families's meal.

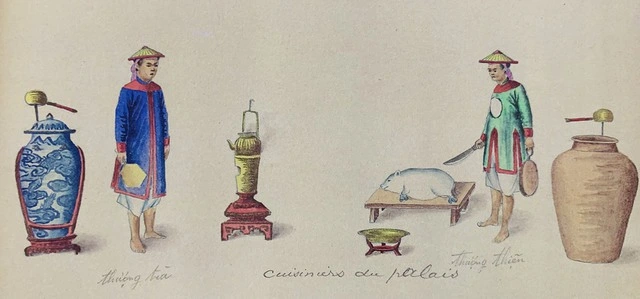
Kitchen staff dedicated to serving beverage (left) and food (right) for the Emperor and the Royal Family

==== Dưỡng Chánh đường (養正堂, hall of Dưỡng Chánh ) ====
The building was used as the studying room of princes when they turn 12–13 years old until they reach adulthood (15 years old from Vietnamese law in 19th-20th century), they would be allowed to move out of imperial palace to build their own homes.

==== Ngự Tiền Văn phòng (御前文房, Office of cabinet) ====
The French-style building built in 1932 by emperor Bảo Đại, located on right side of Kiến Trung Lâu as working place for cabinet ministers. This is the latest building in Imperial palace.

Seal of the office Ngự tiền văn phòng chi ấn (御前文房之印)

== Lục Viện (六院, Six residences of concubine) ==
These are the residences of the harem of the Nguyễn dynasty located on the right side of Càn Thành Hall. According to history records, there are 12 institutions totally including Trinh Minh hall which was used by First rank concubine.During the reign of Gia Long, the Six residences only included Thuan Huy residence and Trinh Minh residence (built in 1810 for First and Second Rank concubines). During the reign of Minh Mang, there were six residences. By the beginning of the reign of Thieu Tri, after the construction of two more palaces, Doan Thuan and Doan Hoa (1843), the Six residences had increased to 11 buildings (Thuan Huy Palace, Tan Trang Palace, Ly Thuan Palace, Doan Huy Palace, Doan Trang Palace, Doan Tuong Palace, Doan Chinh Palace, Doan Thuan Palace, Doan Hoa Palace, Dong Tong Palace, Tay Tong Palace) and one hall, Trinh Minh. Most of them was destroyed in 1947 during French-Vietnamese war and the rest was demolished by emperor Bảo Đại when he returned to this place in 1949. Those included:

=== Thuận Huy Viện (順徽院) ===
It was built in Gia Long's era (1802–1820) as a residence for concubines from third (Tam giai Tần,三階嬪), fourth rank (Tứ giai Tần,四階嬪) and fifth (Ngũ giai Tần,五階嬪) rank.

=== Đoan Huy viện (端徽院) ===
It was built in the 8th year of Ming Mạng (1827) as a residence for concubines of the Sixth rank (Lục giai Tiệp dư,六階婕妤).

=== Đoan Trang viện (端莊院) ===
It was built in the 2nd year of Ming Mạng (1821) as a residence for concubines from the Seventh "(Thất giai Quý nhân,七階貴人), eighth (Bát giai Mỹ nhân,八階美人) and ninth ranks (Cửu giai Tài nhân,九階才人).

=== Đoan Tường viện (端祥院) ===
It was built in the 3rd year of Ming Mạng (1822) as a residence for concubines from the Seventh "(Thất giai Quý nhân,七階貴人), eighth (Bát giai Mỹ nhân,八階美人) and ninth ranks (Cửu giai Tài nhân,九階才人).

=== Đoan Thuận viện (端順院) ===
It was built in the 3rd year of Thiệu Trị (1843) as a residence for concubines from the Seventh "(Thất giai Quý nhân,七階貴人), eighth (Bát giai Mỹ nhân,八階美人) and ninth ranks (Cửu giai Tài nhân,九階才人).

=== Đoan Hòa viện (端和院) ===
It was built in the 6th year of Thiệu Trị (1846) as a residence for concubines from the seventh "(Thất giai Quý nhân,七階貴人), eighth (Bát giai Mỹ nhân, 八階美人) and ninth ranks (Cửu giai Tài nhân, 九階才人).

=== Đoan Chính viện (端政院) ===
it was a residence for concubines from Seventh "(Thất giai Quý nhân,七階貴人), eighth (Bát giai Mỹ nhân, 八階美人) and ninth rank (Cửu giai Tài nhân, 九階才人).

=== Lý Thuận viện(裏順院) ===
it was built in 18th year of Ming Mạng (1837) as residence for concubines of Former Emperor.

== Gardens ==
=== Thiệu Phương Viên(紹芳園, Royal garden) ===
The garden is famous for its Van Tu Hoi Lang structure, which has a meandering corridor shaped like the letter Swastika in Buddhism (卍) located in the center running out to four sides. At the 4 corners of this corridor, there are 4 small architectural works, including 2 houses and 2 halls. It was built in 1828 during the reign of Emperor Minh Mạng

=== Minh Thận Điện (明慎殿, Hall of Minh Thận) ===
It was located in the left side of Hall of Càn Thành, built in Gia Long's era (1802–1820) as the part of royal garden demolished by Emperor Thiệu Trị in 1841 to build the new private buddhist temple for emperor, namely (Nhật Thành Lâu, 日成樓).

=== Cơ Hạ Viên (幾暇園, Cơ Hạ Garden) ===
According to historical records of the Nguyen dynasty, the Cơ Hạ garden was initially the study place of Crown Prince Nguyen Phuc Dam (later emperor Minh Mang) when he lived in the palace. In the 18th year of Minh Mang (1837), the area was renovated and expanded, connecting with Rear garden (also a royal garden) with the function of a royal garden.

In the 3rd year of Thieu Tri (1843), the emperor had more pavilions, courtyards, and terraces built... such as the Khâm Văn hall, Vong Ho Pavilion, Thuong Thang Tower, Quang Bieu Pavilion, Minh Ly Thu Trai, Quang Phong Pavilion, Nhat Than Veranda, Kim Nghe Bridge, Tu Phuong Ninh Mat Corridor... The garden also had lakes, caves, artificial stream, artificial mountains...etc, making the scenery even more diverse and rich, upgrading it to a royal garden, called Cơ Hạ garden.

During the reign of Emperor Tự Đức, several other structures were added and renovated. Towards the end of the Nguyễn dynasty, due to a lack of maintenance, the Cơ Hạ garden area deteriorated severely.

In the 17th year of Emperor Thành Thái (1905), the emperor cleared the corridors on both sides to build housing for soldiers.

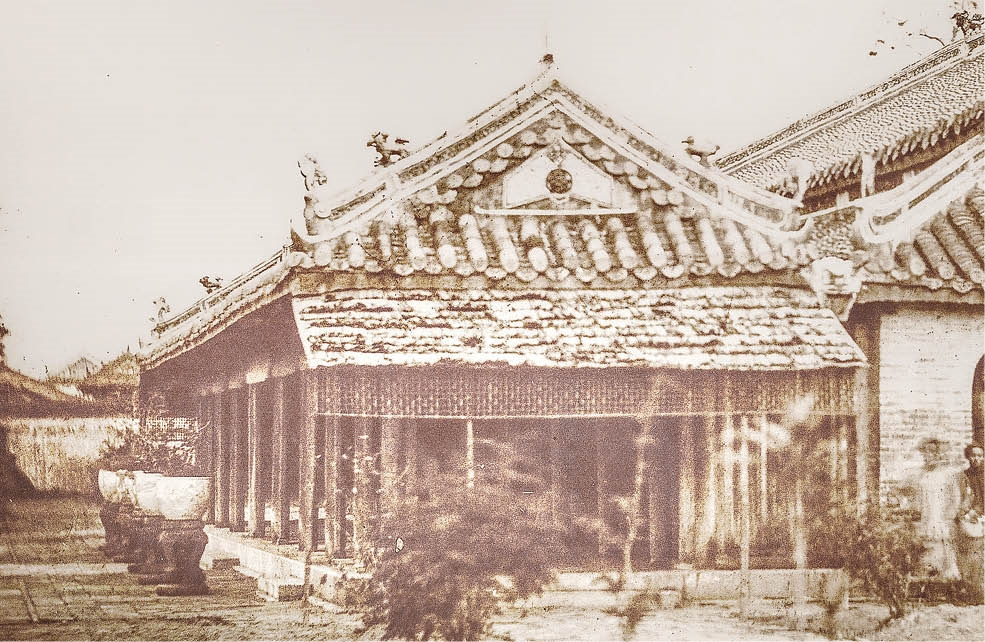
Khâm Văn điện (欽文殿), the main building of the garden used as the study room of princes, built in 1843

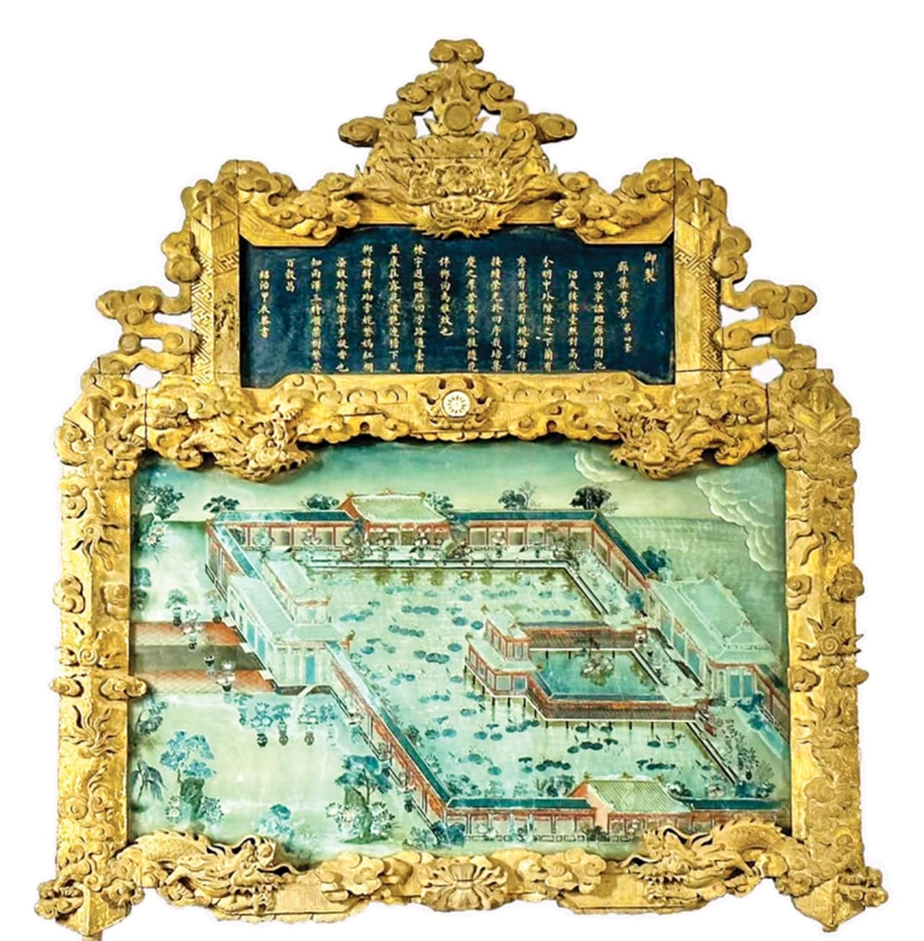
Painting of Cơ Hạ garden

=== Hậu Hồ (湖後, Rear Lake garden) or Nội Kim Thủy hồ (內金水湖) ===
It was the imperial garden made in 1804 for imperial family to visit and boat riding. Most of the building and sructure was lost and dismantled during emperor Thanh Thái's reign.

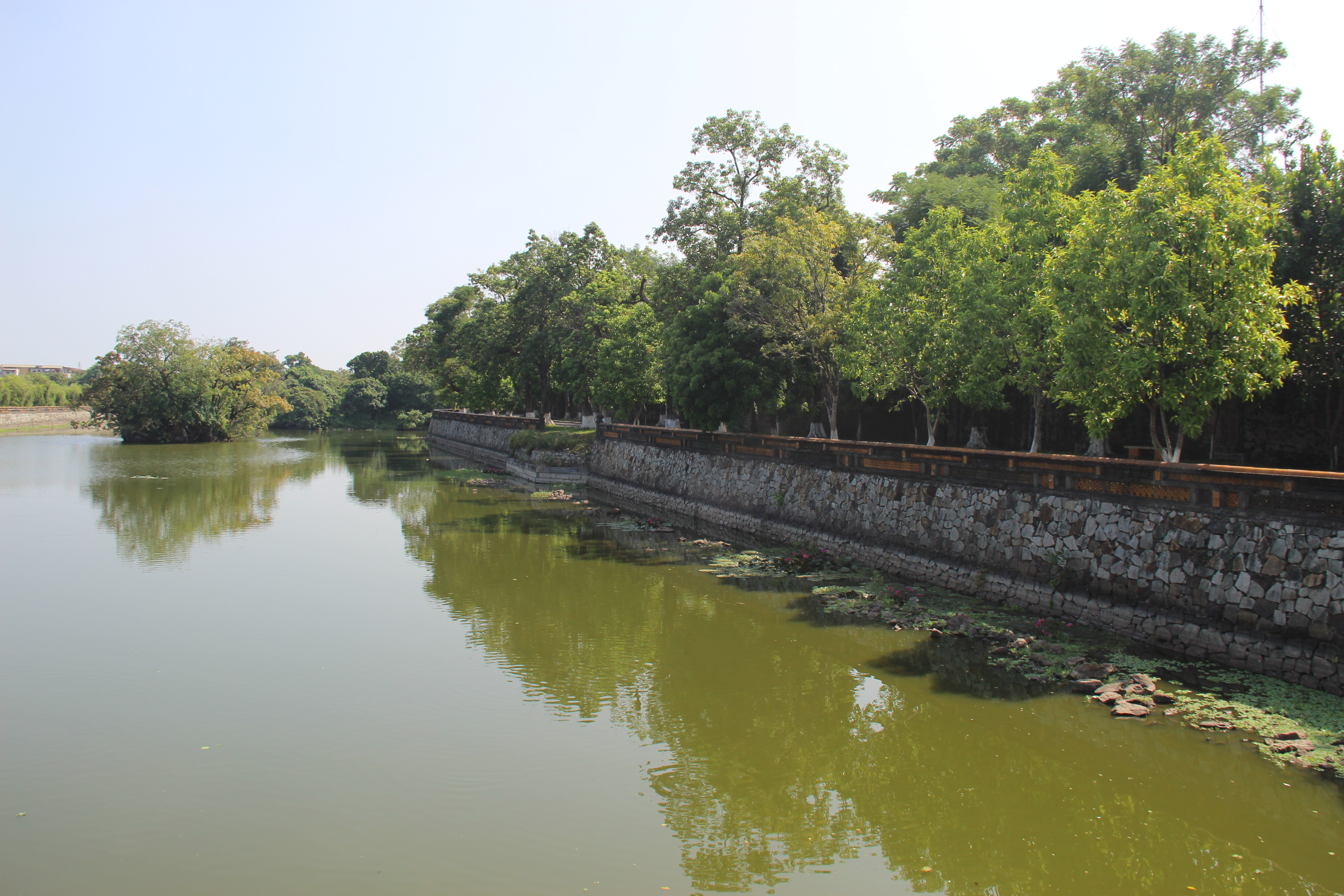
Hậu Hồ artificial island.

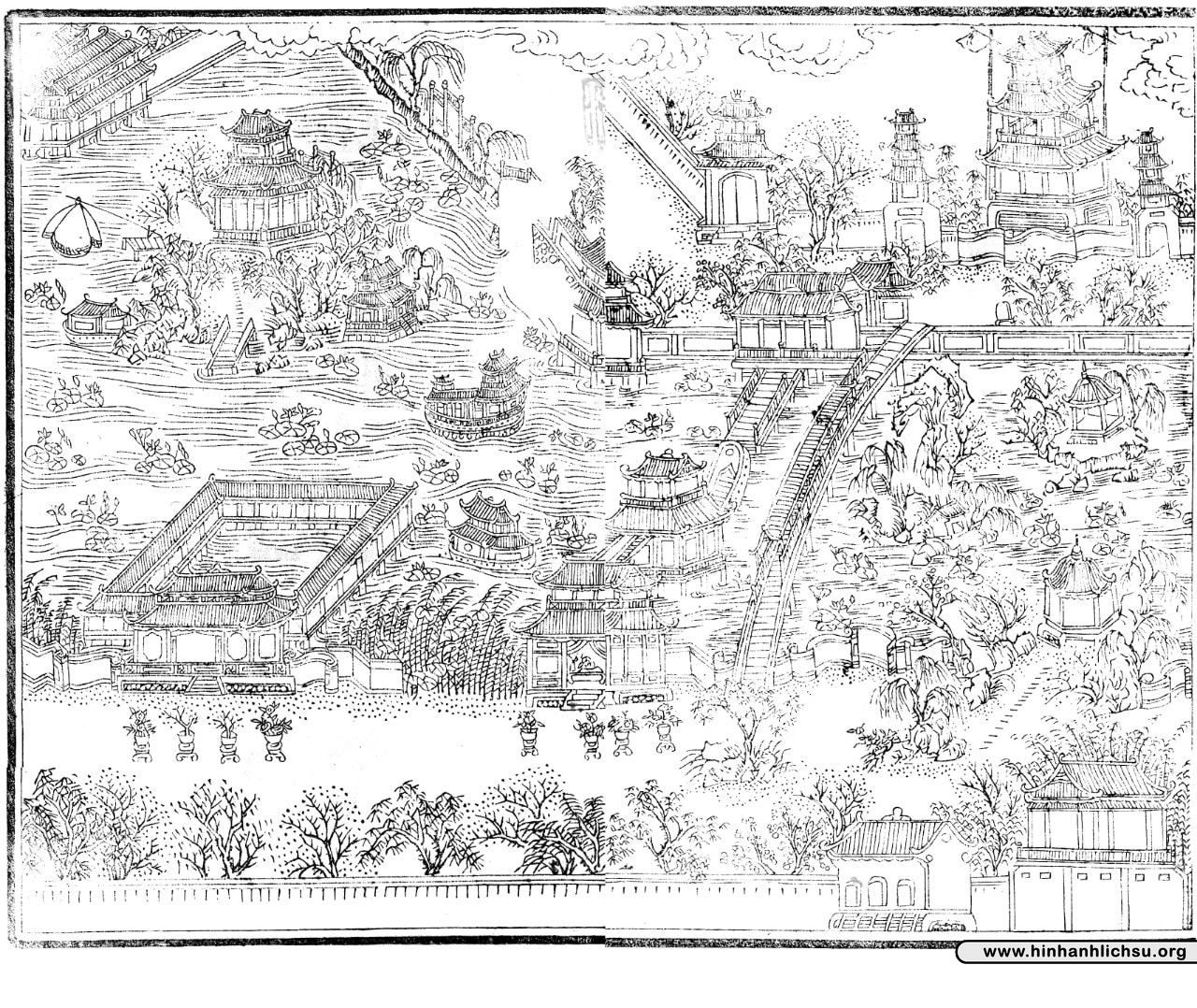
Woodcut miniature impressionist depiction of Hậu Hồ, 1845.

== Pavilions ==
=== Thái Bình Lâu (太平樓) (Peace Pavilion) ===
Thai Binh Lau is a two-story wooden building located in the middle of a rectangle 32m wide and 58m long. The project was ordered by Emperor Khai Dinh to be built in 1919, and completed in 1921. It was used by the emperor to relax, read, sightseeing and composing poetry. Thai Binh Lau was renovated in 1990–1991.

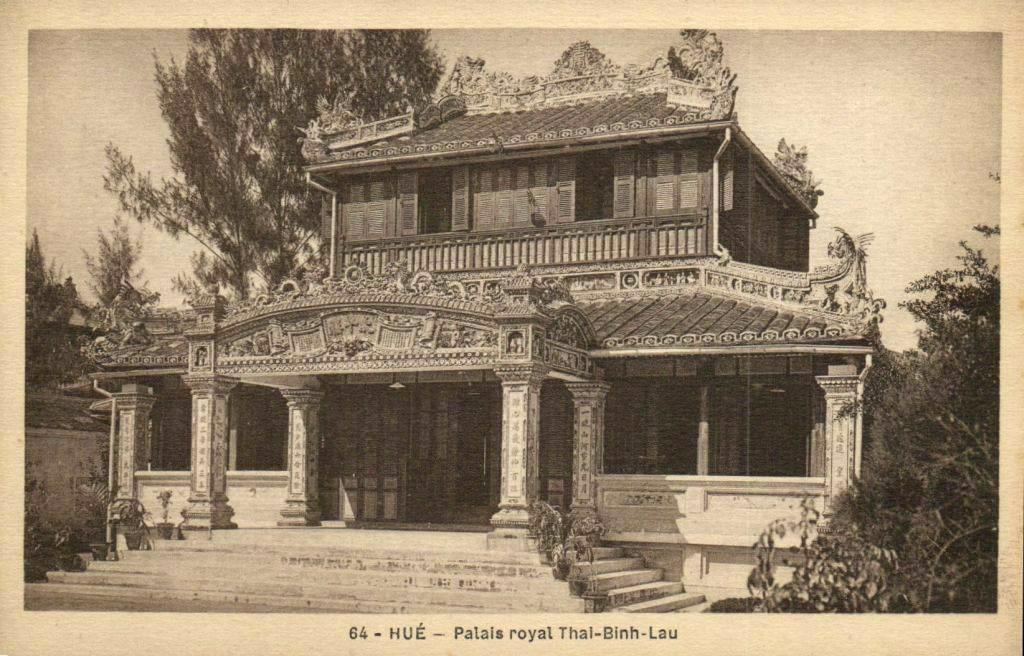
Thái Bình Pavilion, unknown date.

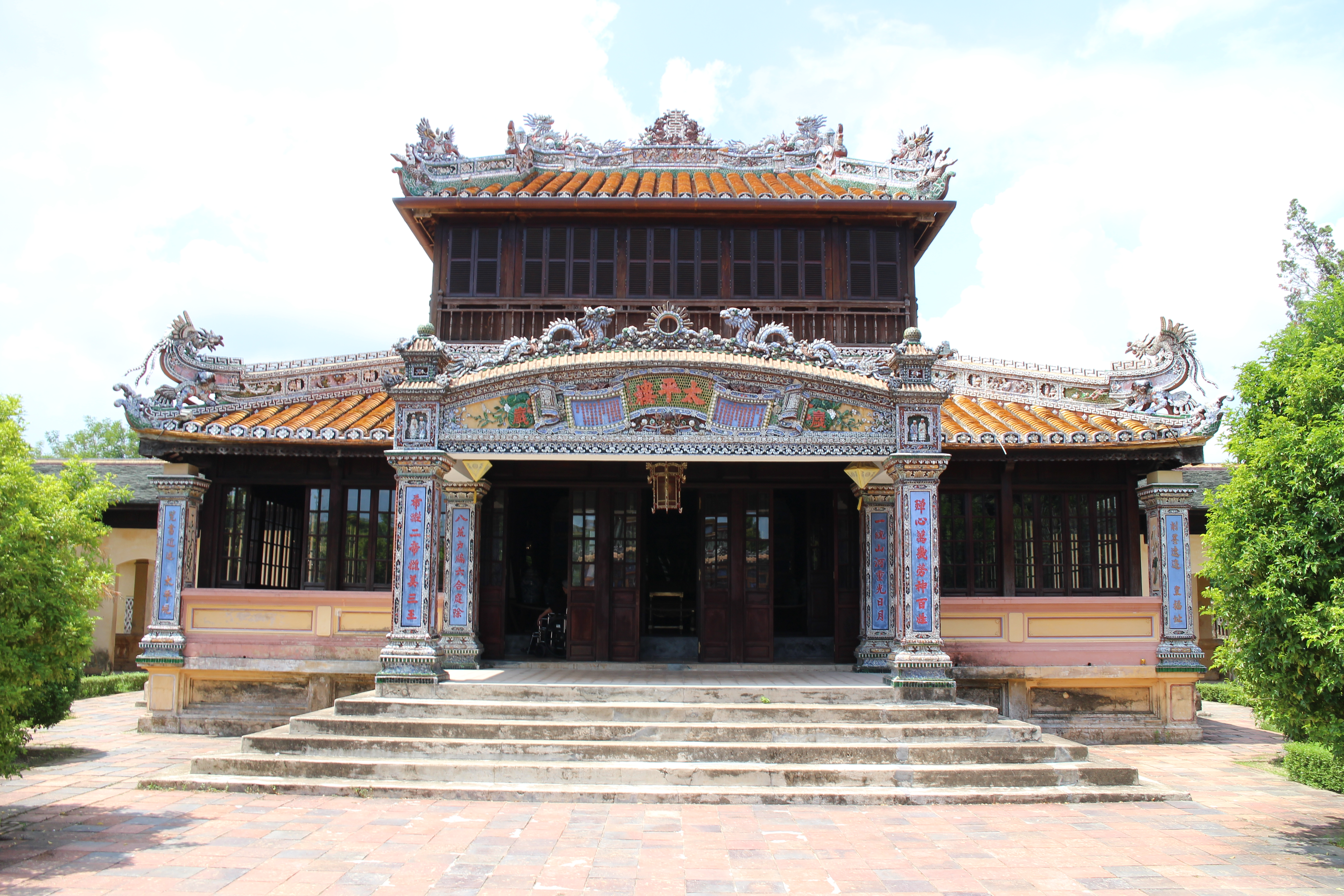
Thái Bình Pavilion - Personal reading and poetry room of the Emperor.

=== Nhật Thành Lâu (日成樓) (Nhat Thanh Pavilion) ===
It is located in the left side of Hall of Càn Thành, originally ground of the hall of Minh Thận(明慎殿), demolished by Emperor Thiệu Trị in 1841 to build the new private buddhist temple for the Emperor. It was destroyed in 1947 and again in 1968, and fully rebuilt in 2018.

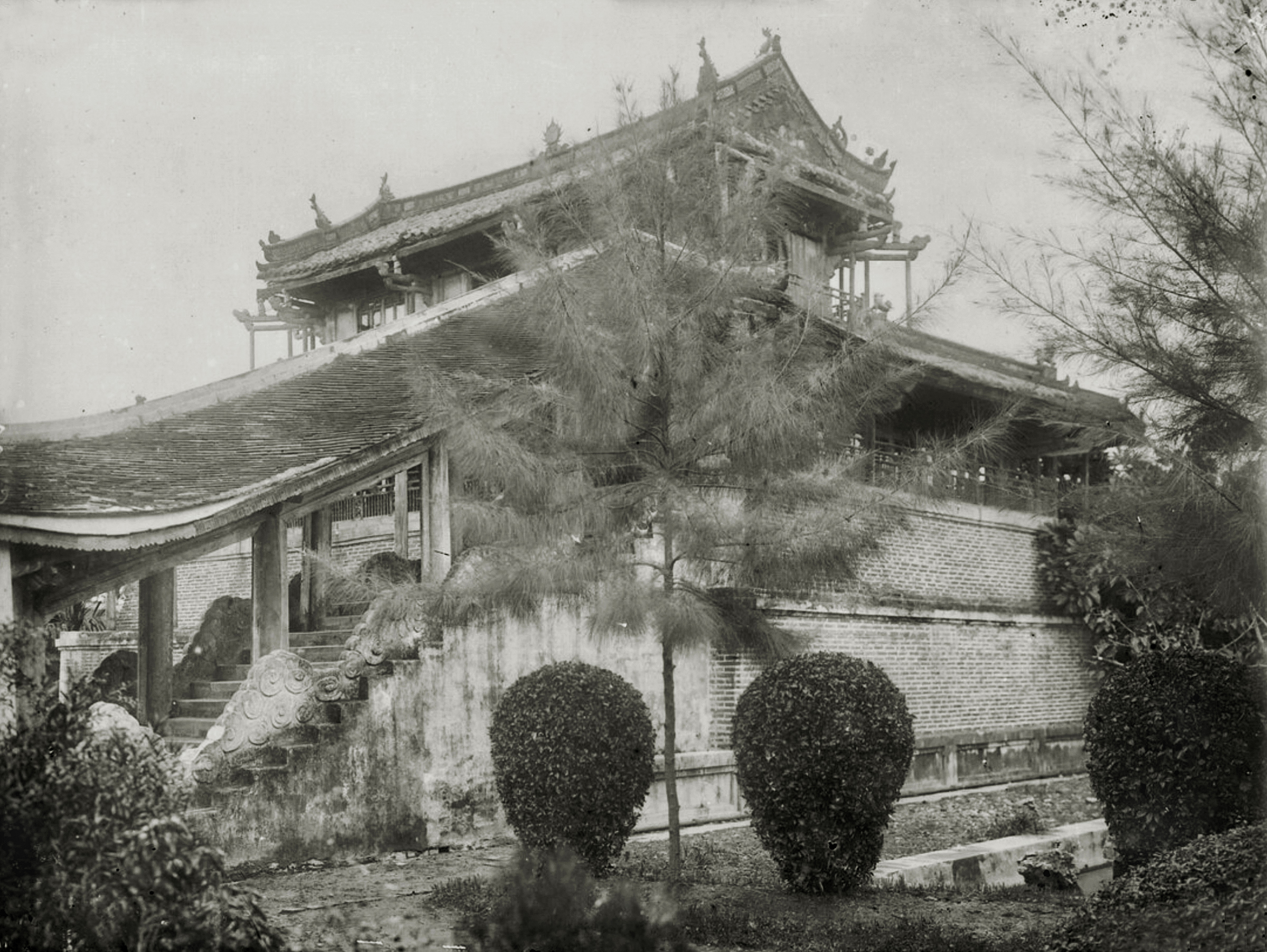
Nhật Thành Pavilion, 1920s.

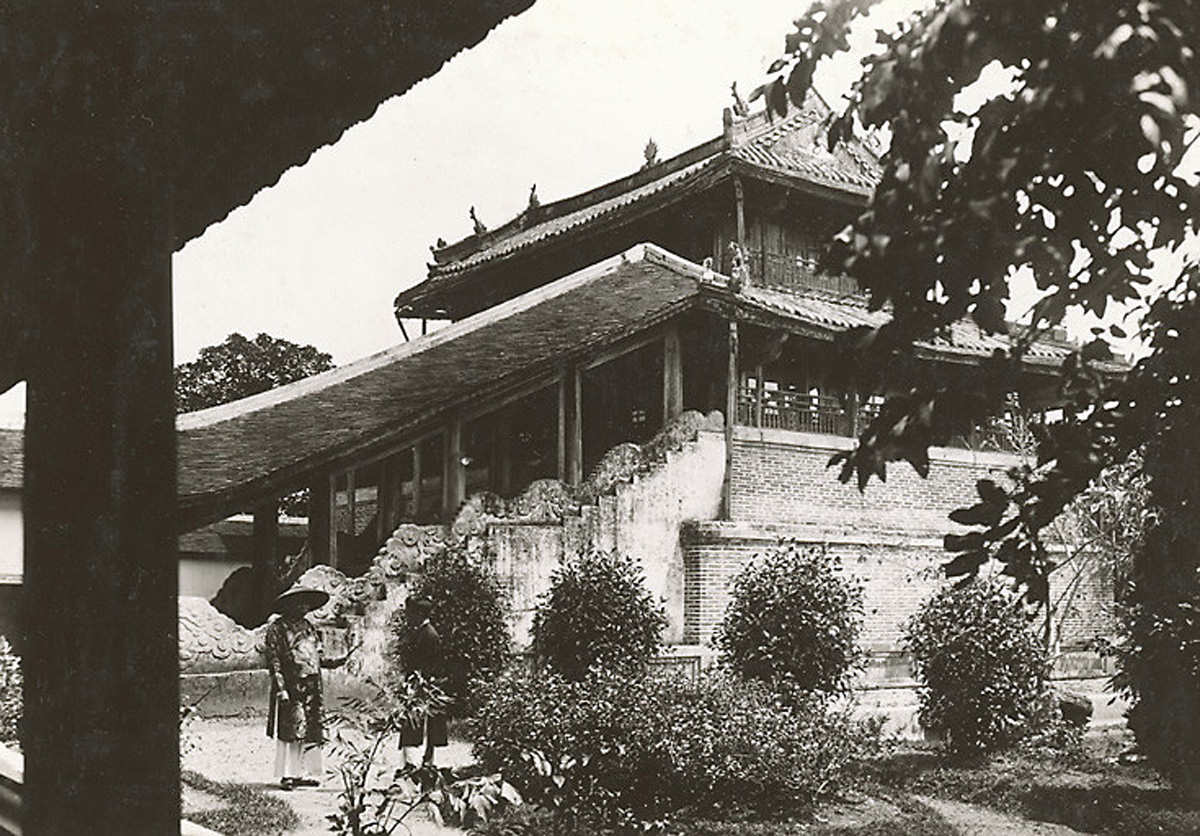
Nhật Thành Pavilion, 1920s.

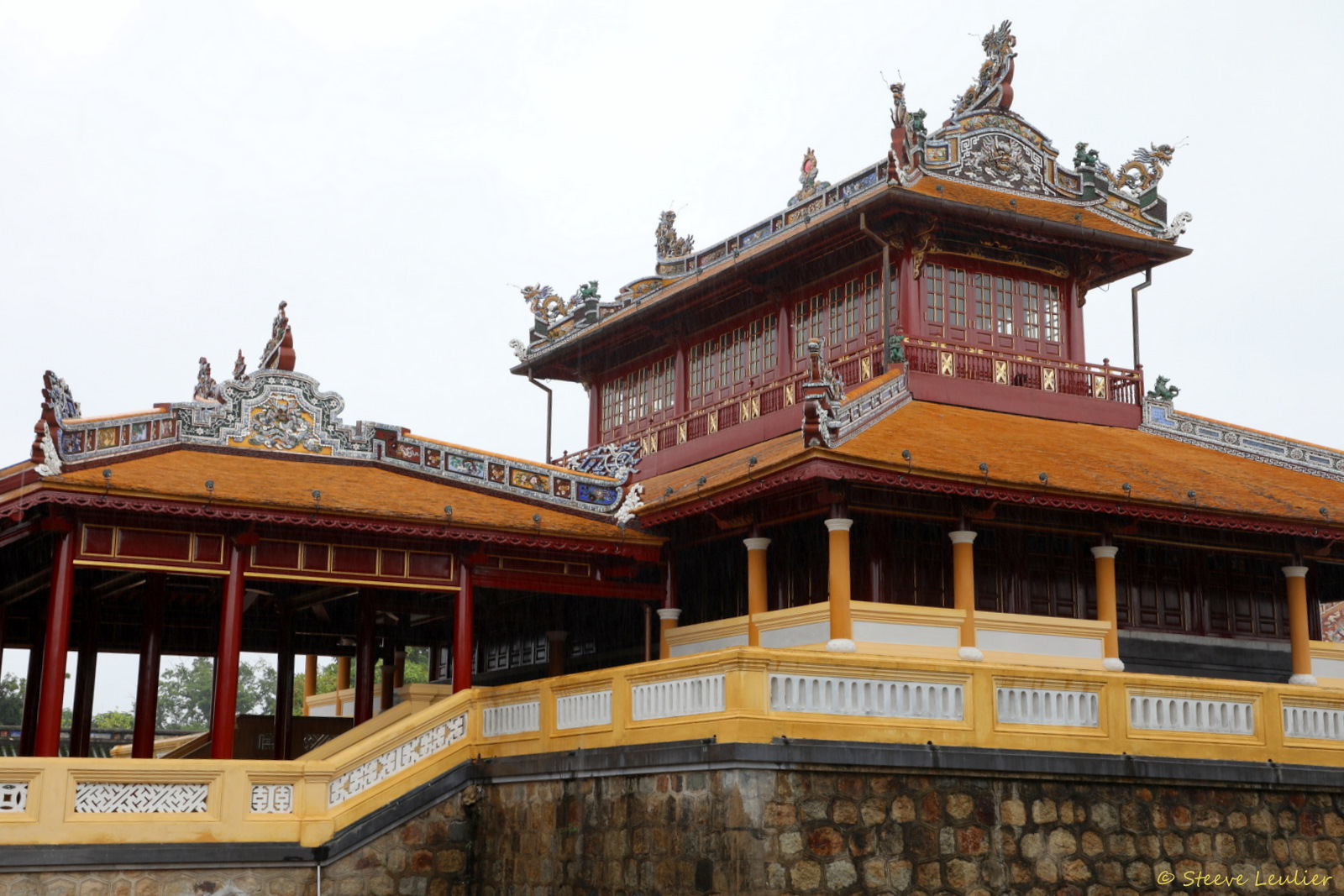
Reconstructed structure, 2018.

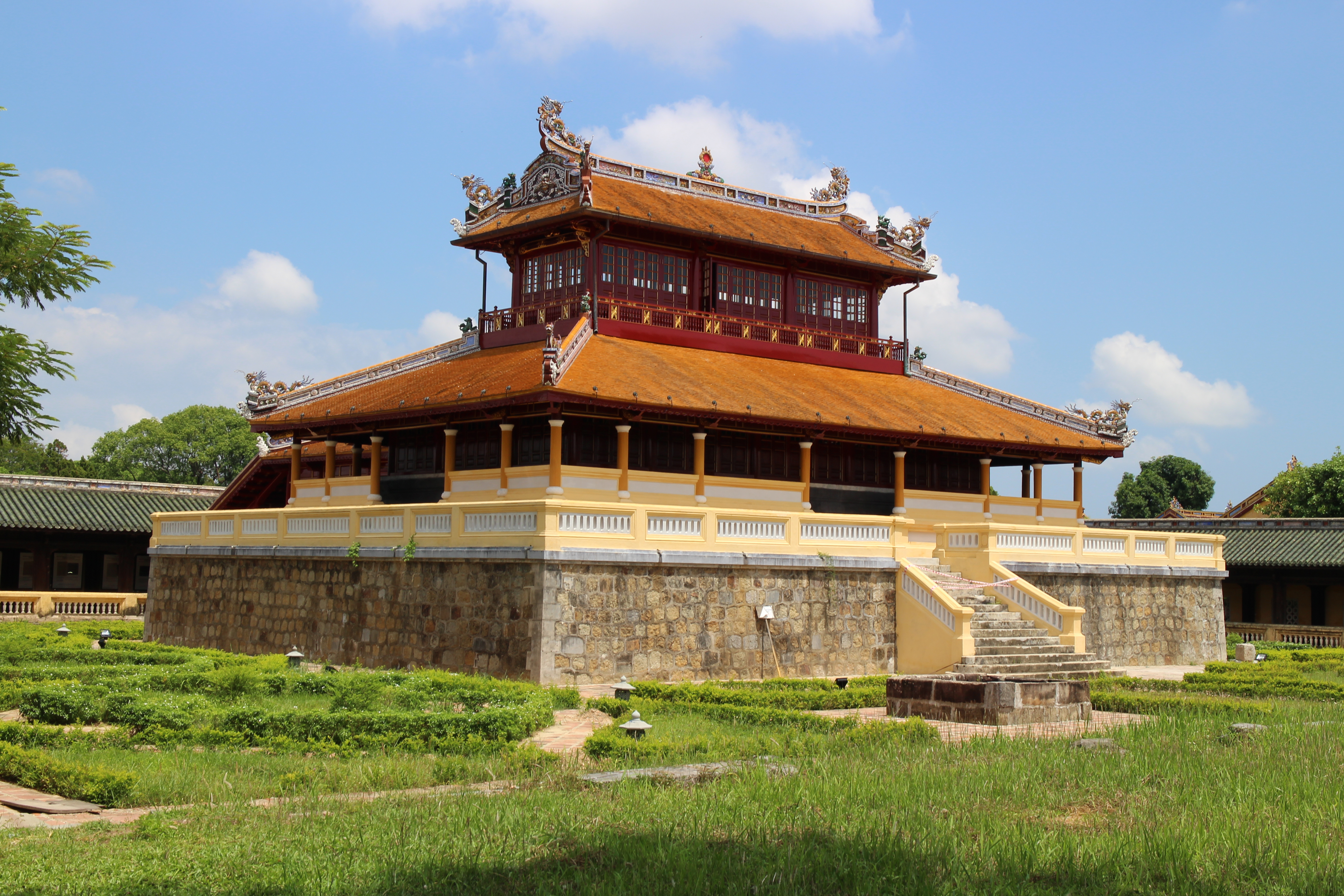

== Gallery ==
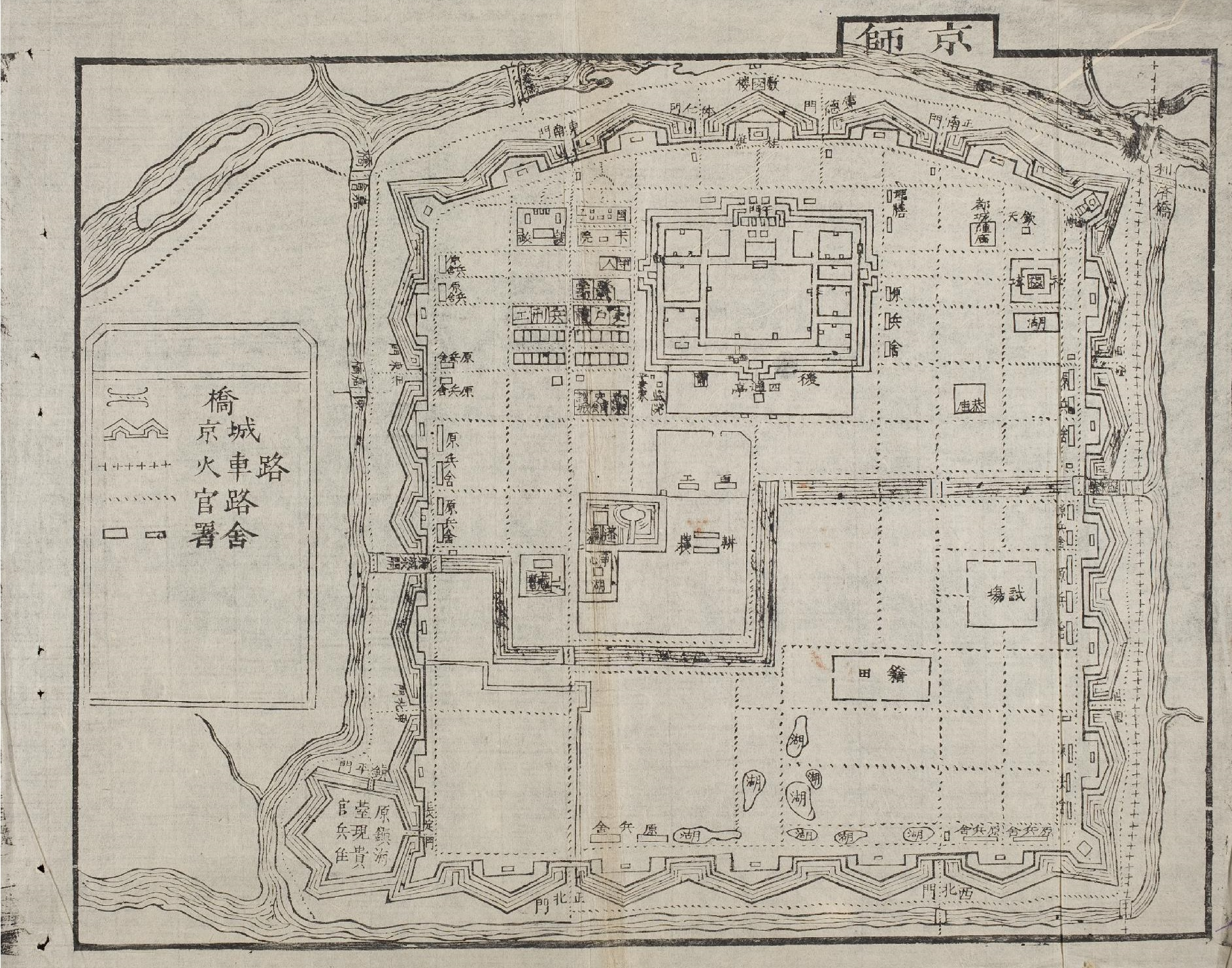
The citadel's plan in the Đại Nam nhất thống chí. The diagram is oriented with south at the top

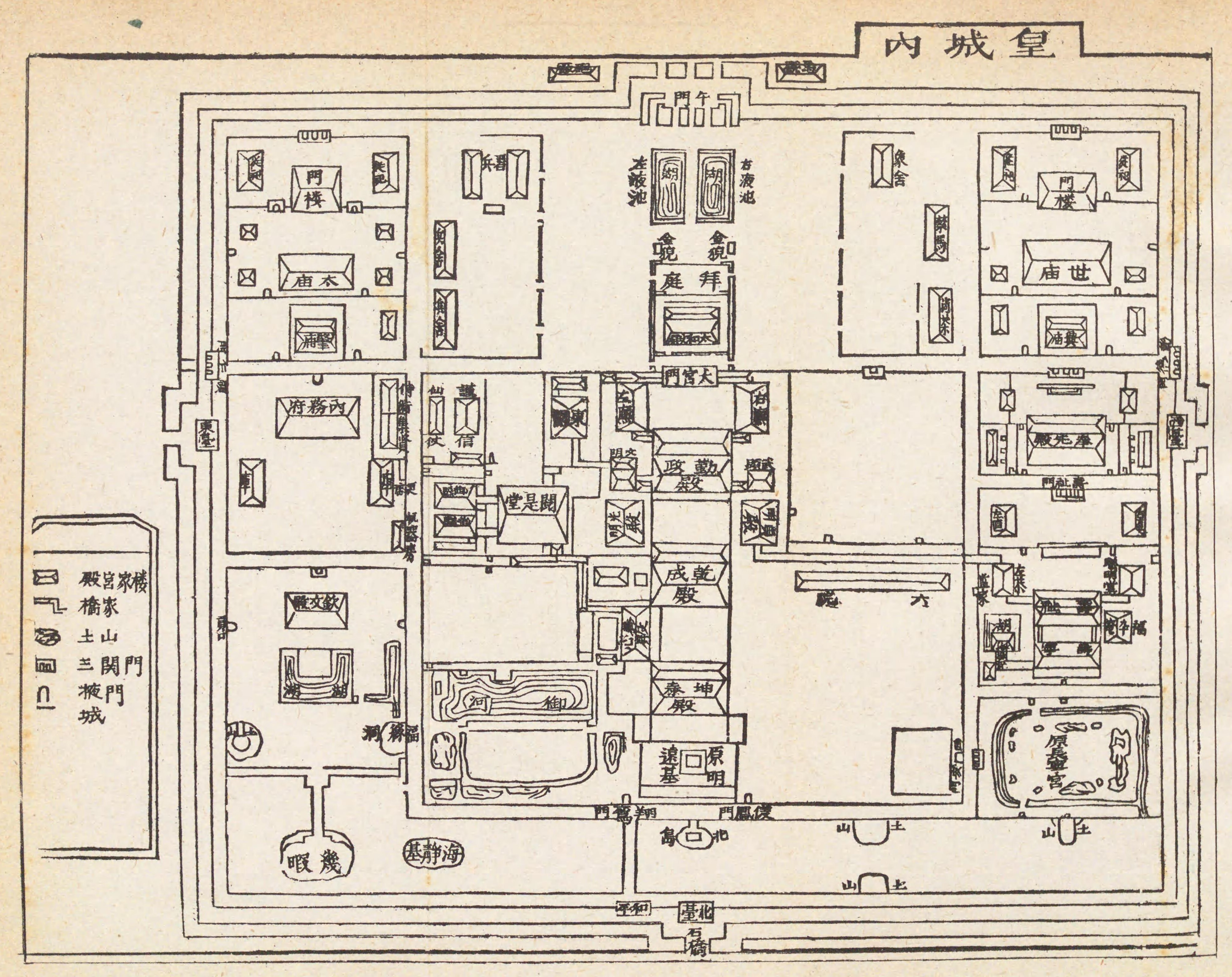
Huế Imperial City map, 1909.

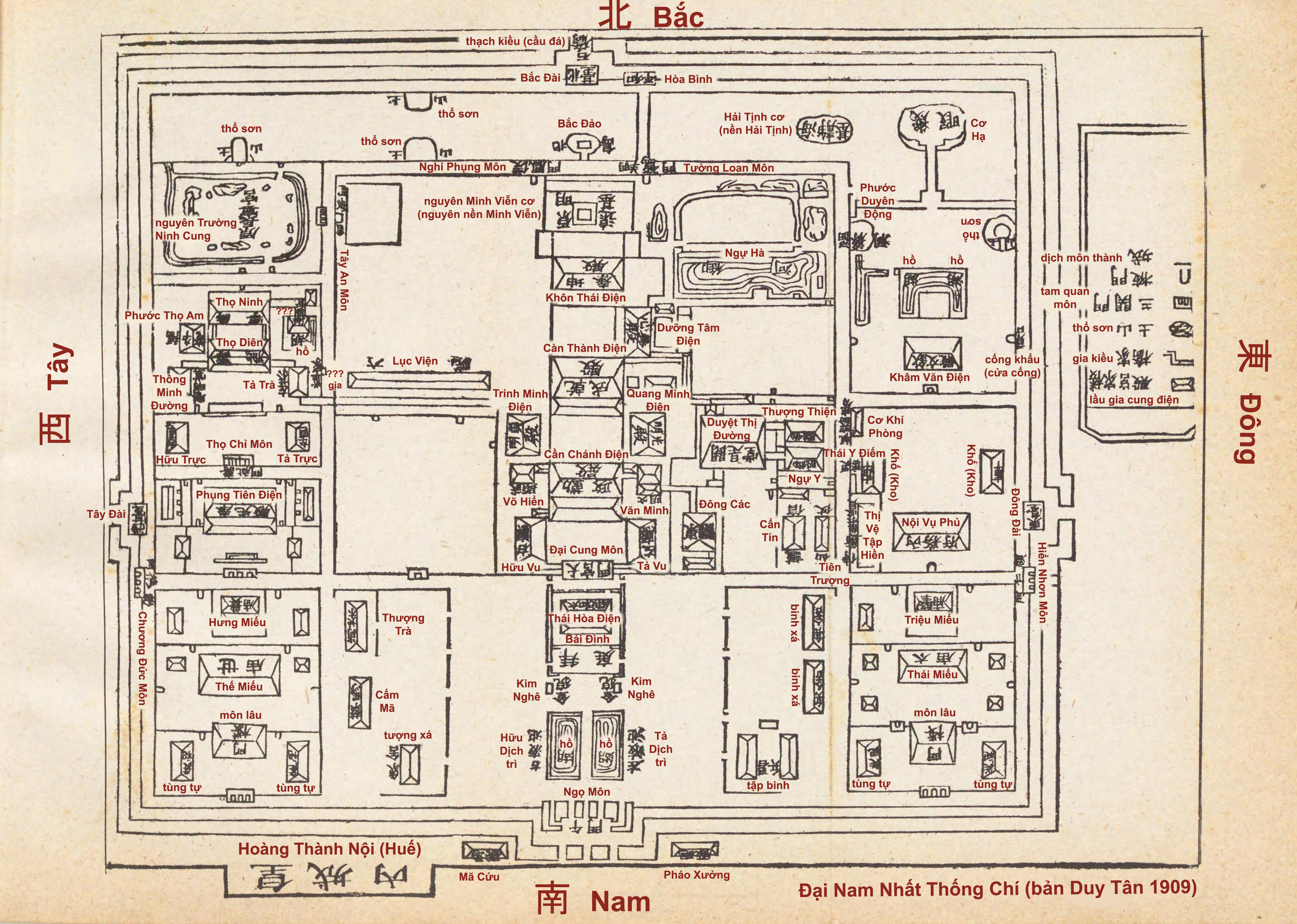
Huế Imperial City map with Vietnamese translation, 1909.

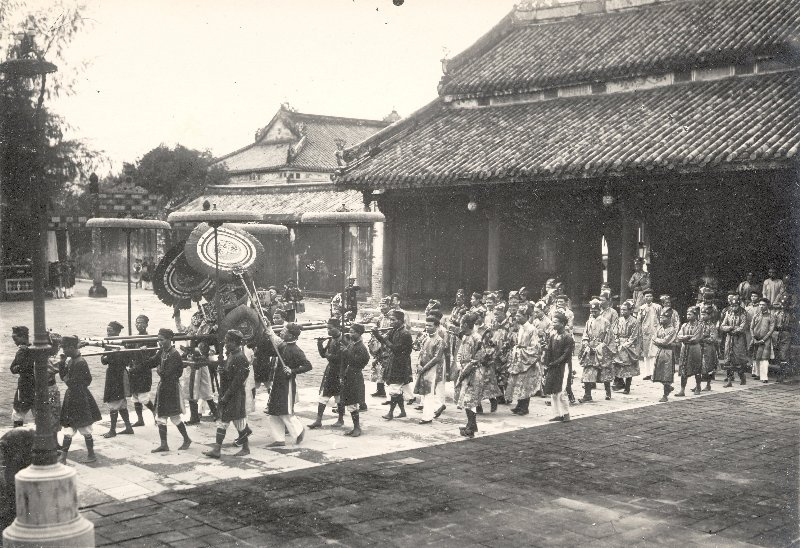
Enthronement of Emperor Bảo Đại in the Imperial City in 1926 with the Emperor's palanquin escorted from Hall of Diligent Governance (Điện Cần Chánh) to the Throne Hall

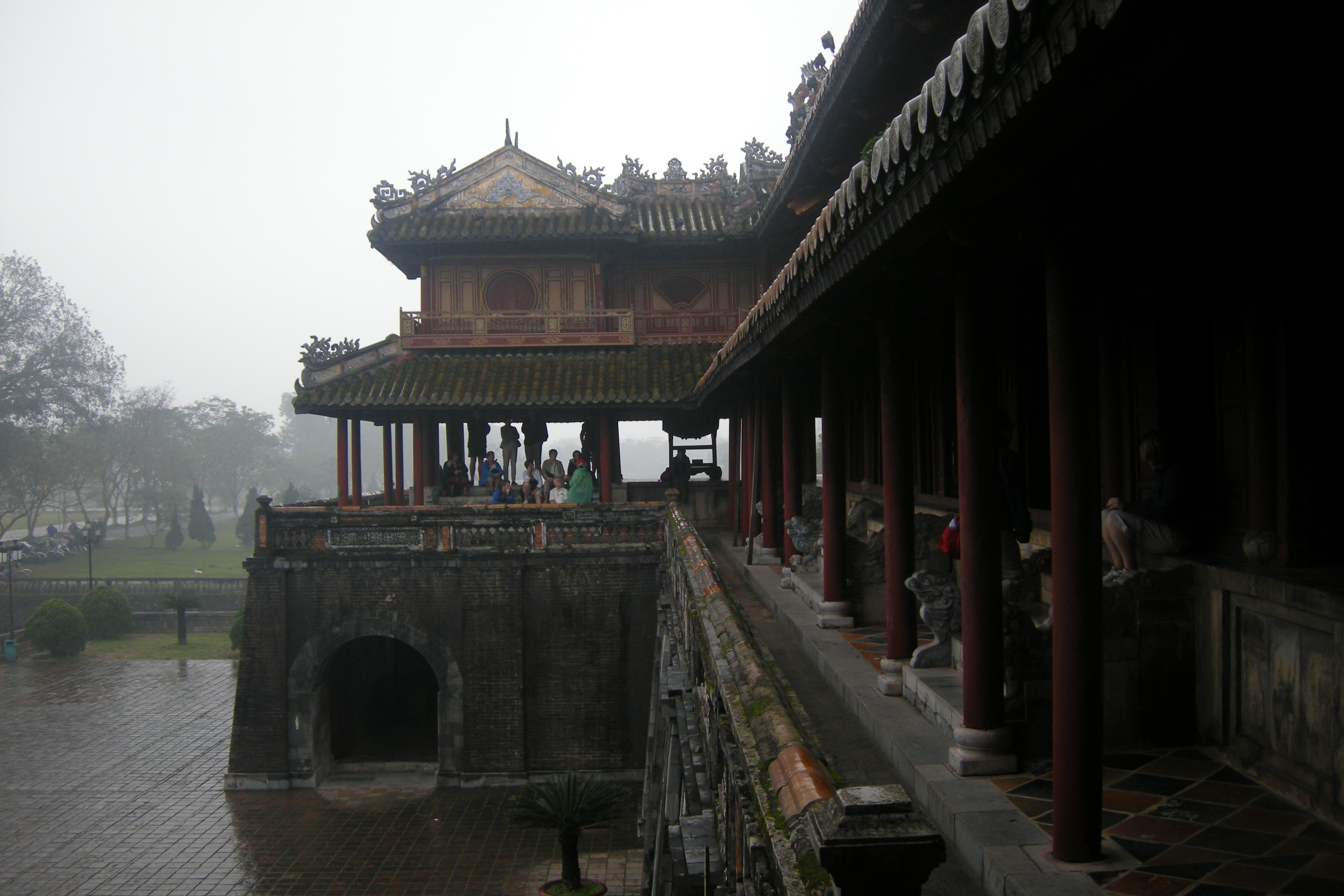
Walls of the Meridian Gate

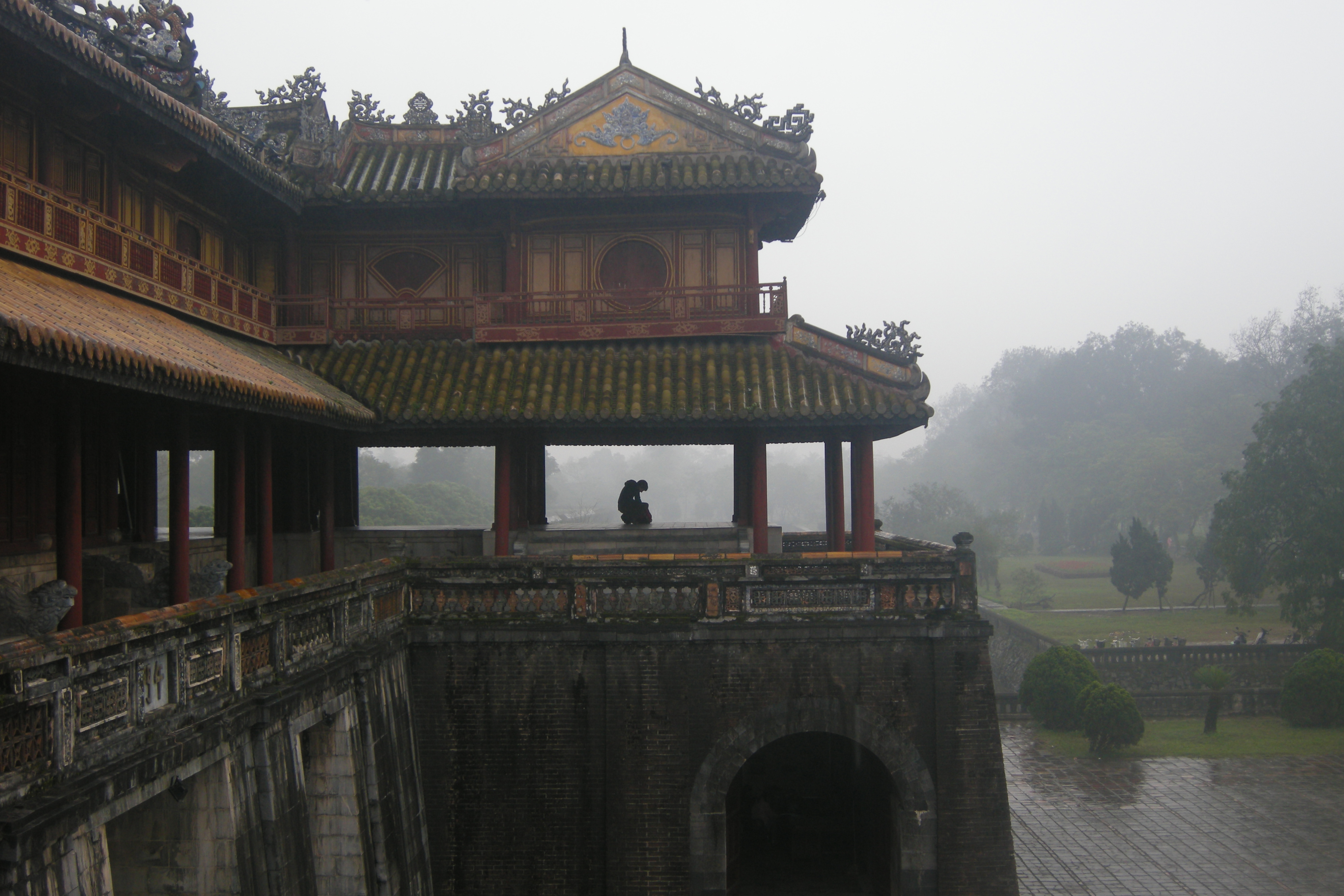
Meridian Gate

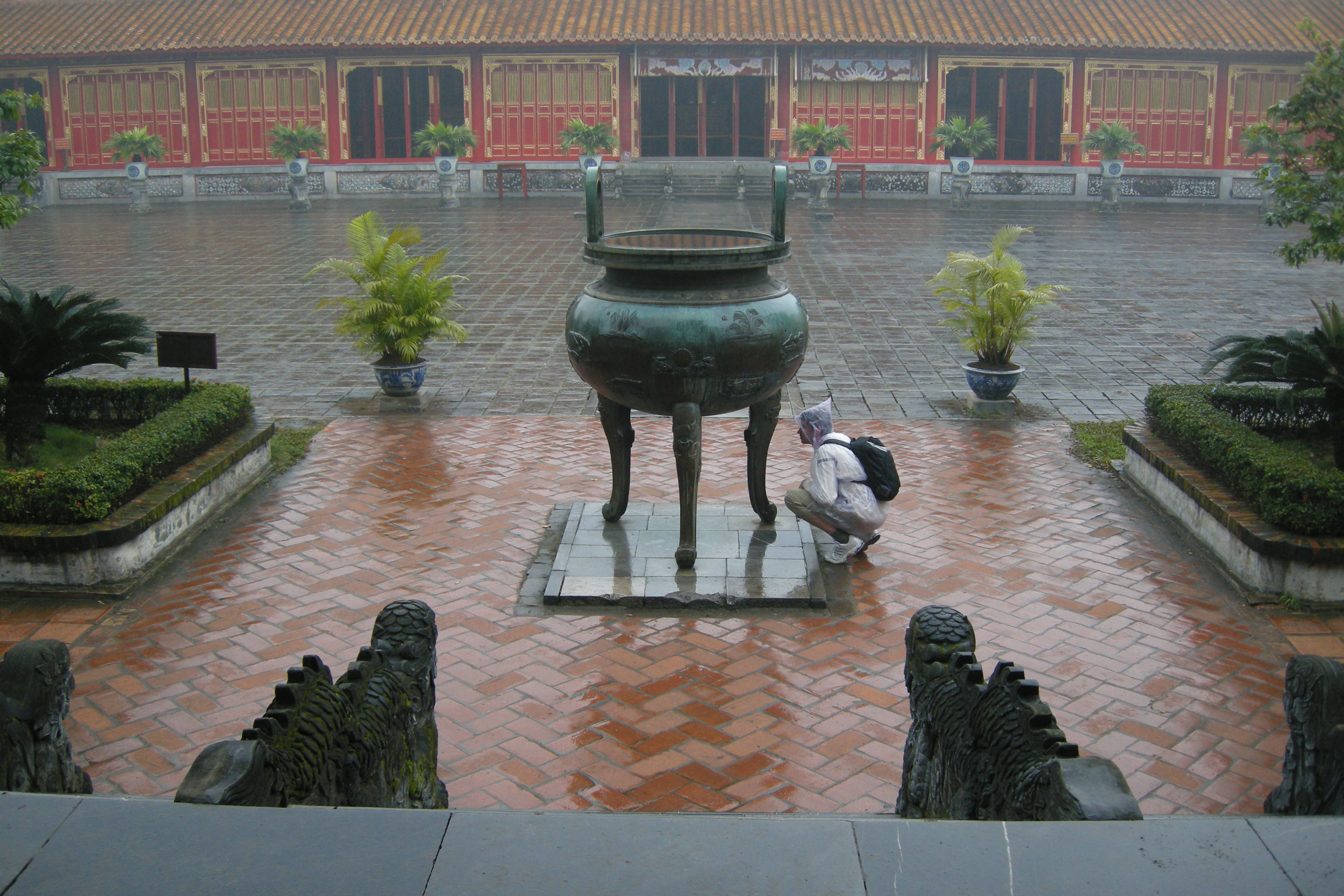
Tripod cauldrons of the Nguyễn dynasty

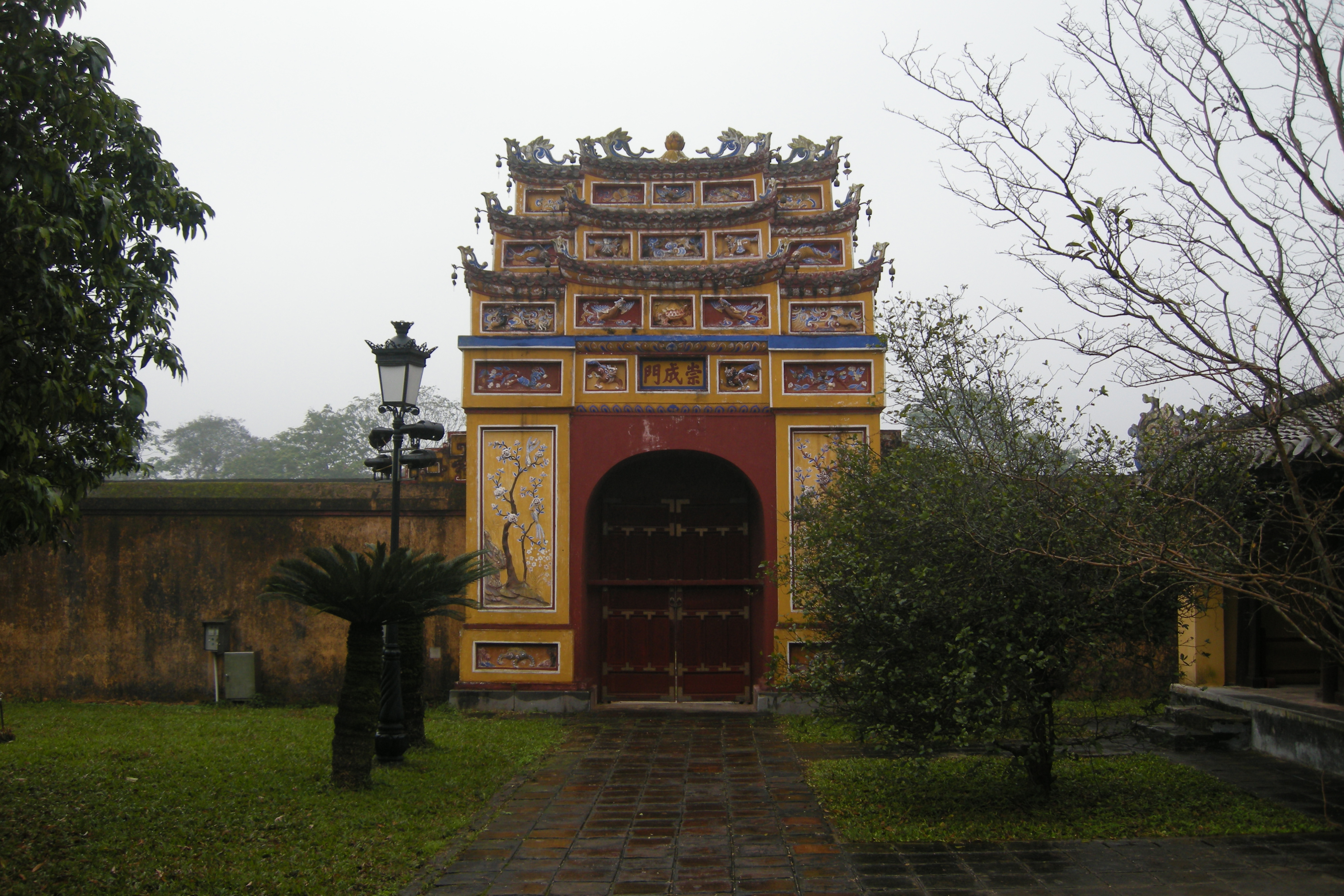
Gate

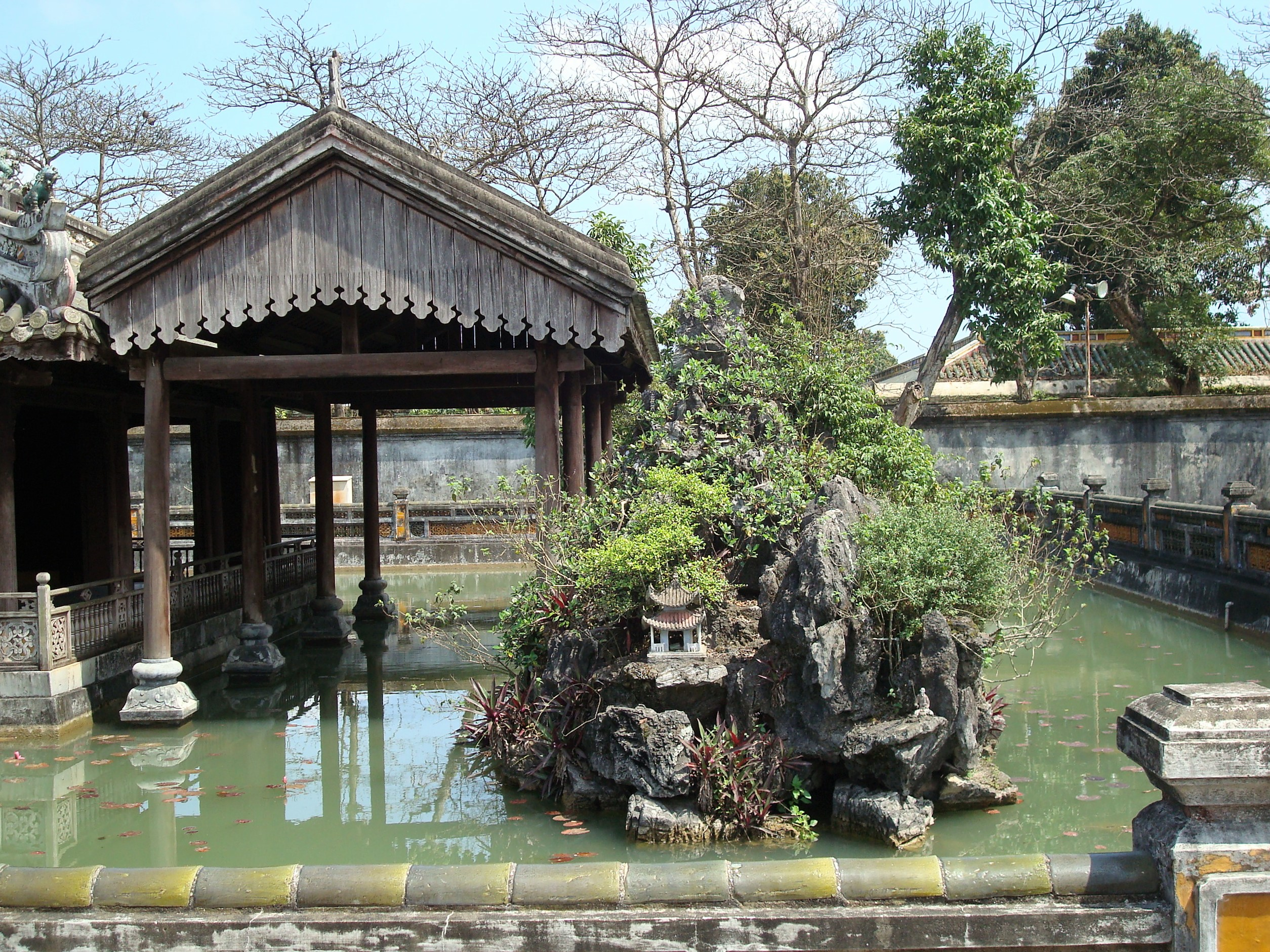
Pleasure garden in the residence of the imperial queen-mother. Hòn non bộ is installed in the lake
