= Hoàng Thị Cúc =

Empress dowager of Vietnam (1890–1980)

Đoan Huy Hoàng thái hậu 端徽皇太后
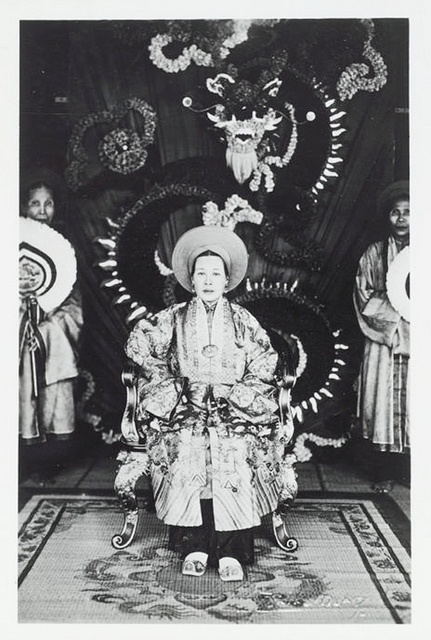
- Born: Hoàng Thị Cúc; 28 January 1890; Phú Lộc, Huế, French Indochina
- Died: 9 November 1980 (aged 90); Huế, Vietnam
- Religion: Buddhism

Từ Cung Hoàng thái hậu (28 January 1890 – 9 November 1980) born Hoàng Thị Cúc, was an empress dowager of Vietnam between 1926–1945. She was the mother of emperor Bảo Đại of the Nguyễn dynasty. She was the concubine of emperor Khải Định. She had never been empress consort, but was given the title of empress dowager in her capacity as the mother of the emperor.
