= Khải Định =

Emperor of Vietnam from 1916 to 1925

Emperor Khải Định 啓定帝
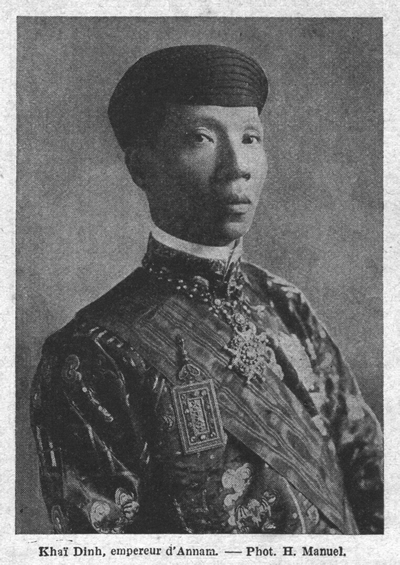

Emperor of Đại Nam under French protectorate of Annam and Tonkin
- Reign: 18 May 1916 – 6 November 1925
- Predecessor: Duy Tân
- Successor: Bảo Đại

Emperor of the Nguyễn dynasty
- Reign: 18 May 1916 – 6 November 1925
- Predecessor: Duy Tân
- Successor: Bảo Đại
- Born: 8 October 1885; Imperial City of Huế, French protectorate of Annam
- Died: 6 November 1925 (aged 40); Kien Trung palace, Imperial City of Huế, French Indochina
- Burial: Ứng Lăng (應陵)
- Spouse: 12 including Trương Như Thị Tịnh; Noble Consort of First Rank, Ân phi Hồ Thị Chỉ; Hoàng Thị Cúc, Empress Mother Đoan Huy
- Issue: Nguyễn Phúc Vĩnh Thụy
Names
- Nguyễn Phúc Bửu Đảo (阮福寶嶹); Nguyễn Phúc Tuấn (阮福晙)
Era name and dates
- Khải Định (啓定): 1916 – 1925
Posthumous name
- Tự Thiên Gia Vận Thánh Minh Thần Trí Nhân Hiếu Thành Kính Di Mô Thừa Liệt Tuyên Hoàng Đế (嗣天嘉運聖明神智仁孝誠敬貽謨承烈宣皇帝)
Temple name
- Hoằng Tông (弘宗)
- House: Nguyễn Phúc
- Father: Đồng Khánh
- Mother: Empress Hựu Thiên
- Religion: Buddhism, Ruism
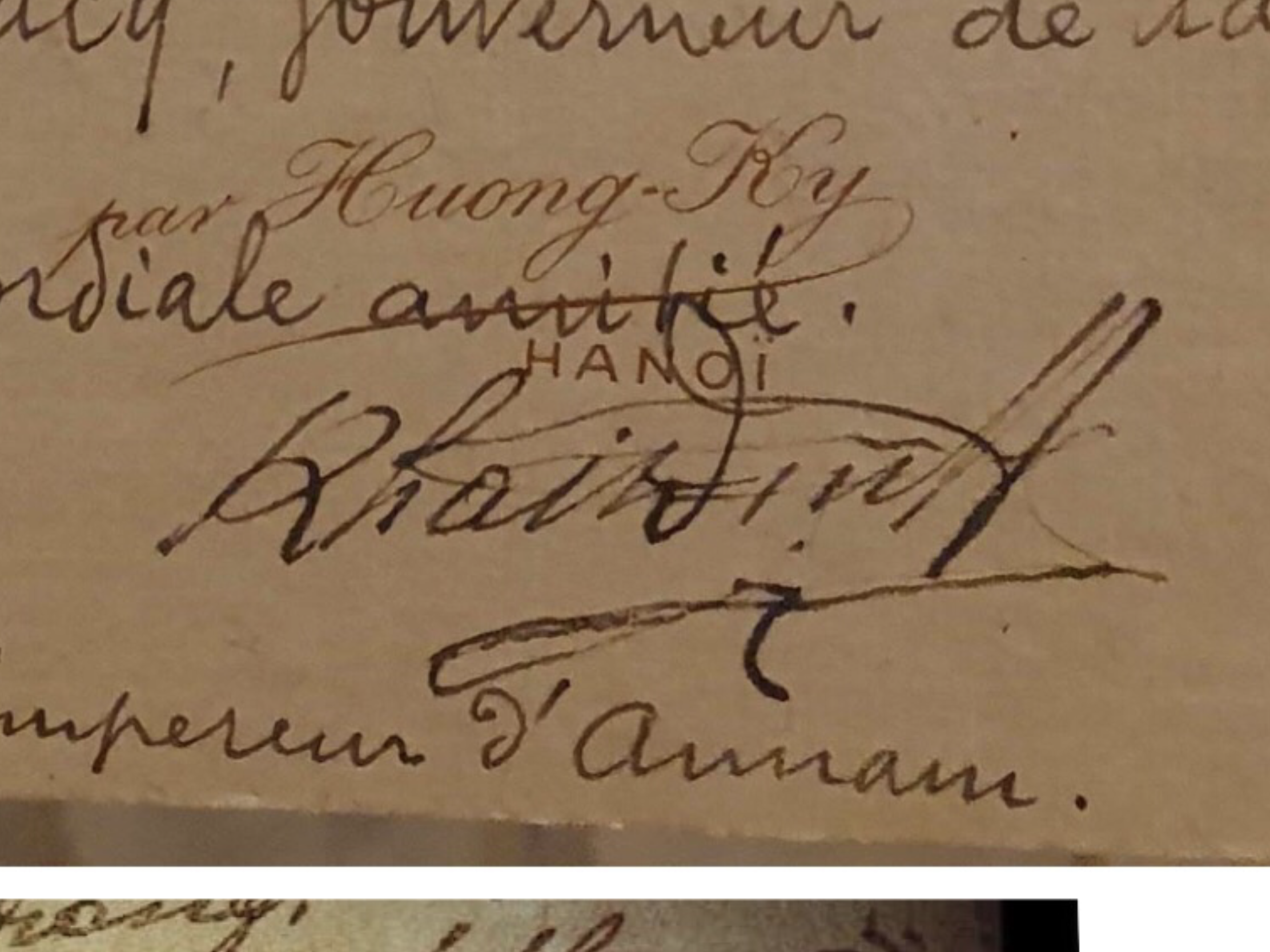
- Signature

Khải Định (Vietnamese: [xa᷉ːj ɗîŋ̟ˀ]; chữ Hán: 啓定; born Nguyễn Phúc Bửu Đảo; 8 October 1885 – 6 November 1925) was the 12th emperor of the Nguyễn dynasty in Vietnam, reigning from 1916 to 1925. His name at birth was Prince Nguyễn Phúc Bửu Đảo. He was the son of Emperor Đồng Khánh, but he did not succeed him immediately.

== Biography ==
Before Emperor Đồng Khánh's era came the eras of Emperor Thành Thái and Emperor Duy Tân, both of whom were exiled by the French for their resistance to the colonial regime. After this trouble, the French decided to enthrone Bửu Đảo as he was the son of the monarch who was the most submissive Nguyễn collaborator with the protectorate, standing with the French colonizers and opposing any independence movements, Emperor Đồng Khánh.

Nguyễn Phúc Bửu Đảo became the nominal ruler of Annam on 18 May 1916, after the exile of Duy Tân (Nguyễn Phúc Vĩnh San) and took the name Khải Định for his reign, meaning "auger of peace and stability." He said he wanted to restore the prestige of the empire, but this was not possible with his close collaboration with the French occupiers. Although not satisfied with his position, Khải Định enacted a policy of close collaboration with the French government and was effectively a puppet political figurehead for the French colonial rulers, following all of their instructions to give "legitimacy" to French policies.

Because of this, Khải Định was very unpopular with the Vietnamese people. The nationalist leader Phan Châu Trinh accused him of selling out his country to the French and living in imperial luxury while the people were exploited by France. Nguyễn Ái Quốc (later known as Hồ Chí Minh) wrote a play about Khải Định called "The Bamboo Dragon" that ridiculed him as being all grand appearance and ceremony but a powerless puppet of the French government.

In 1922, the Emperor's visit to France to see the Marseilles Colonial Exhibition was also ridiculed by nationalist leaders, who hated Vietnam's status as a colonial subject of France and saw nothing in the exhibition worth celebrating.

Emperor Khải Định's unpopularity reached its peak in 1923 when he authorized the French to raise taxes on the Vietnamese peasants, part of which was to pay for the building of his palatial tomb, and which caused a great deal of hardship. He also signed the orders of arrest against many nationalist leaders, such as Phan Bội Châu, forcing them into exile and having their followers who were captured beheaded.

== Marriages and sexuality ==
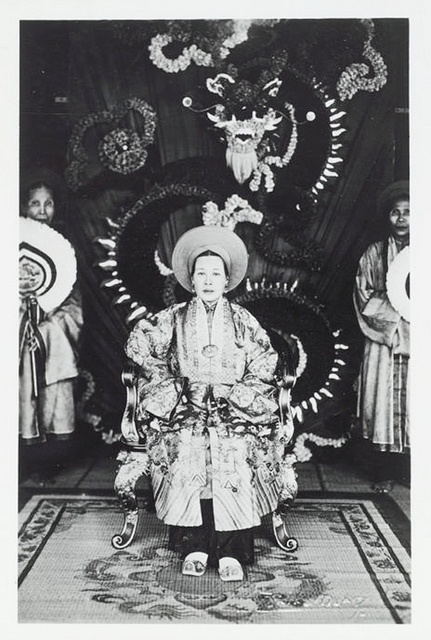
First marriage: Hoàng Thị Cúc as Empress Dowager Từ Cung, last Empress Dowager of Vietnam

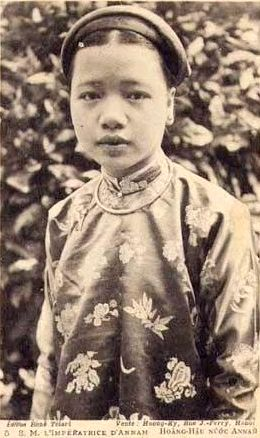
Hồ Thị Chỉ, the concubine

When he was still Duke of Phụng Hóa, Emperor Khải Định married his first wife Trương Như Thị Tịnh in 1907. She left him in 1915 and became a nun, before he was enthroned. Upon ascending the throne, he married his second wife, Ân phi, Noble consort of the first rank Hồ Thị Chỉ (1902–1982) of An Truyền Hồ Đắc clan. She is a daughter of Hồ Đắc Trung, who became Annam's Minister for Public Instruction. Emperor Khải Định had his first and only son with one of his concubines, Hoàng Thị Cúc (1890–1980). She gave birth to Nguyễn Phúc Vĩnh Thụy (later Emperor Bảo Đại) in 1913. After Khải Định's ascension, she was given the title of Huệ tần, noble consort of the third rank, later elevated to the title Huệ phi, noble consort of the second rank.

Historical records and studies state that Emperor Khải Định only had homosexual desires. He rarely slept with his wives during his reign. He was close to his male guard, Nguyễn Đắc Vọng, and always slept with him.

== Death ==
Khải Định suffered poor health like his father and became a drug addict. He died of tuberculosis in the Imperial City of Huế, according to his concubine Ba Phi, who described him as "not interested in sex" and "physically weak".

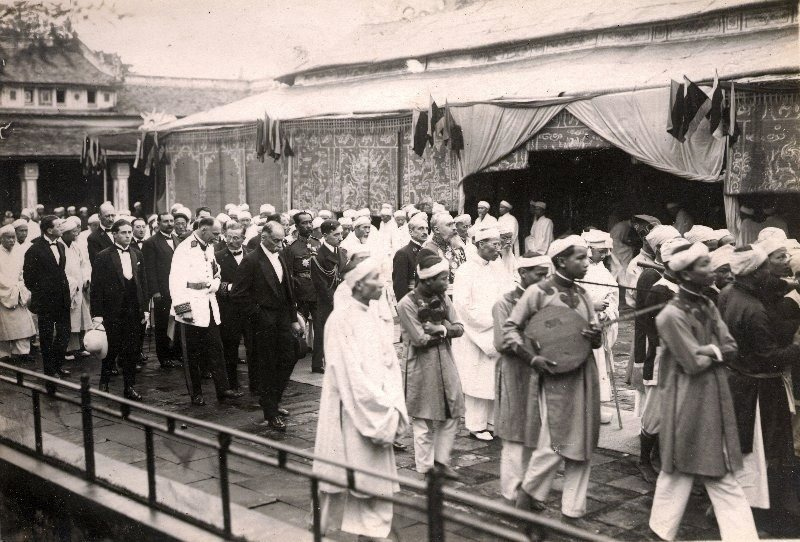
Funeral of Emperor Khải Định

== Reign symbols ==
Symbols created and / or used during the reign of Khải Định
Symbol	Image	Description
Emperor of the Nguyễn dynasty
Seal of Khải Định (Chinese-style)		The inscription Khải Định thần khuê written in Traditional Chinese characters (as opposed to seal script usually used on Nguyễn dynasty period seals).
Seal of Khải Định (French-style), a total of 12 imperial seals were created under Khải Định.		See: Seals of the Nguyễn dynasty.
Personal standard of emperors Khải Định and Bảo Đại		Flag ratio: 2:3.
Personal coat of arms of Khải Định.		The personalised version of the coat of arms of the Nguyễn dynasty, a sword per fess charged with the ramparts of the Purple Forbidden City in Huế, inscribed with six Traditional Chinese characters (啟定大南皇帝) and supported by a single Vietnamese dragon surrounded by clouds. Influences:
Khải Định Thông Bảo (啓定通寶)		A series of cash coins bearing his reign era.
Khải Định Bảo Giám (啓定寳鑑)		A series silver coins bearing his reign era.

== Gallery ==
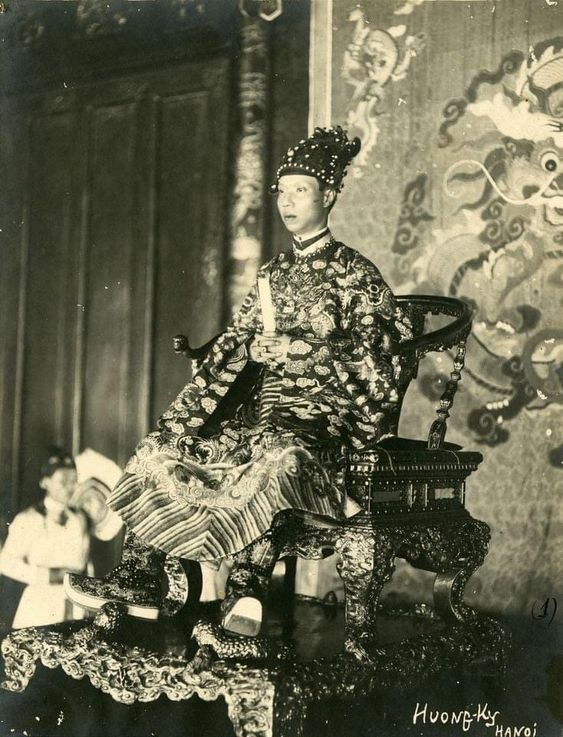
On throne holding a Khuê in Thái Hòa Điện (太和殿) in 1916

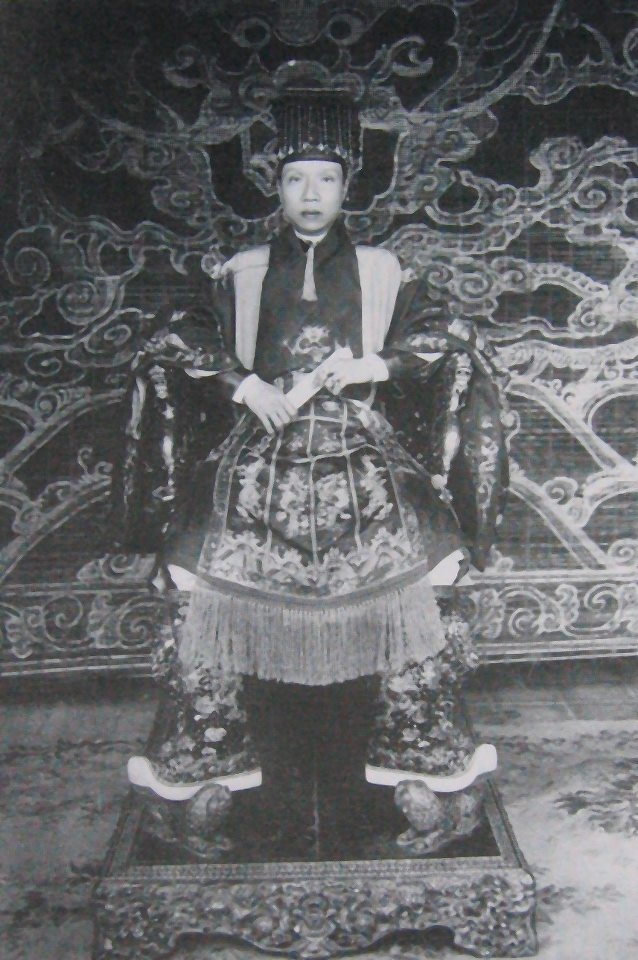
Emperor in Cổn miện (袞冕) ceremonial outfit

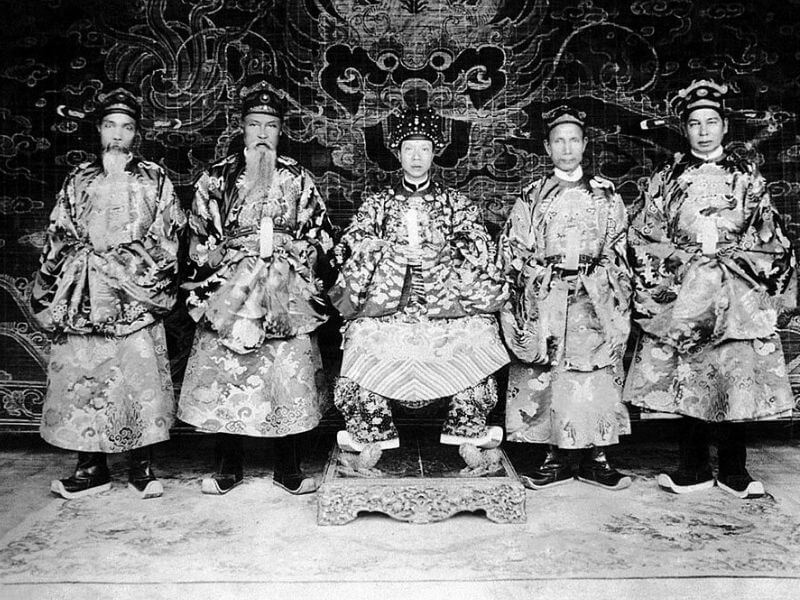
Emperor Khải Định and member of Nội các. From left to right: Hồ Đắc Trung, Tôn Thất Hân, emperor Khải Định (middle), Nguyễn Hữu Bài and Đoàn Đình Duyệt

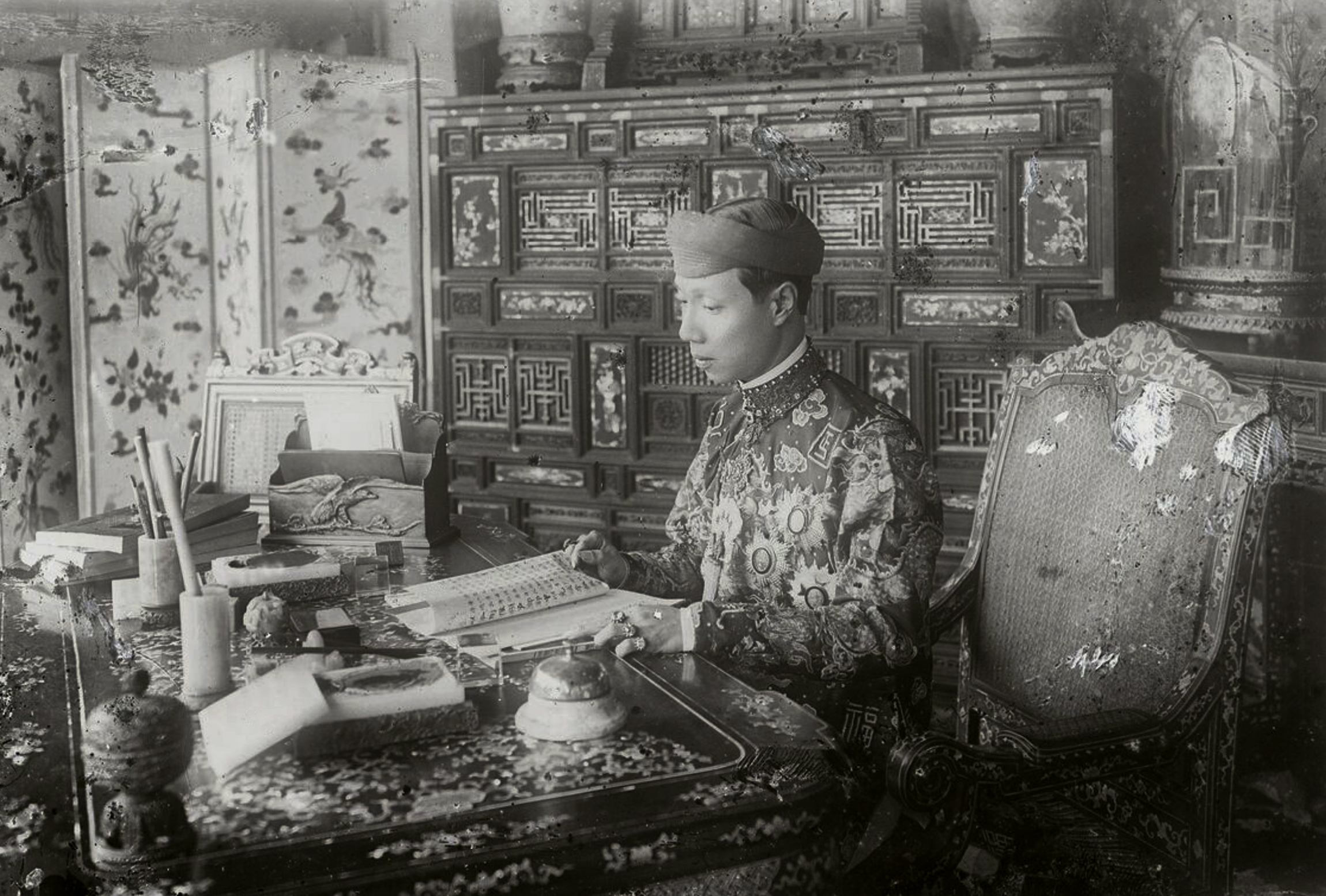
Khải Định working at Kien Trung Palace

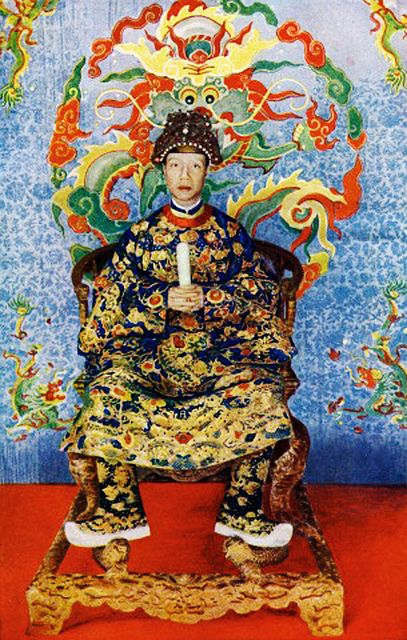
Emperor Khải Định on throne drawing

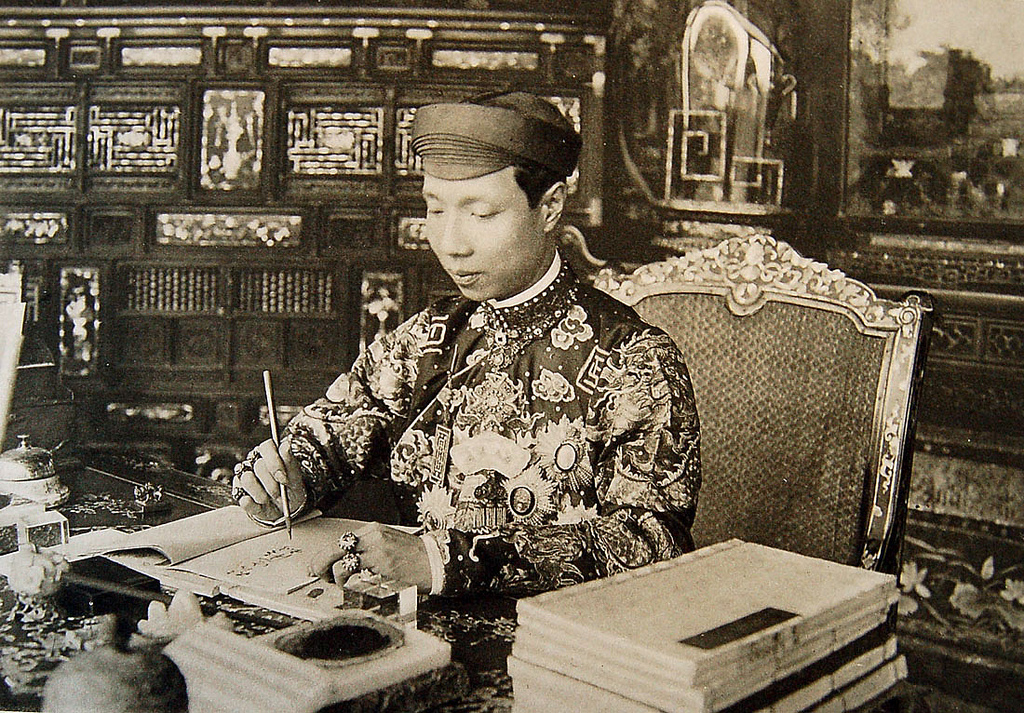
Emperor Khải Định in his study, 1916

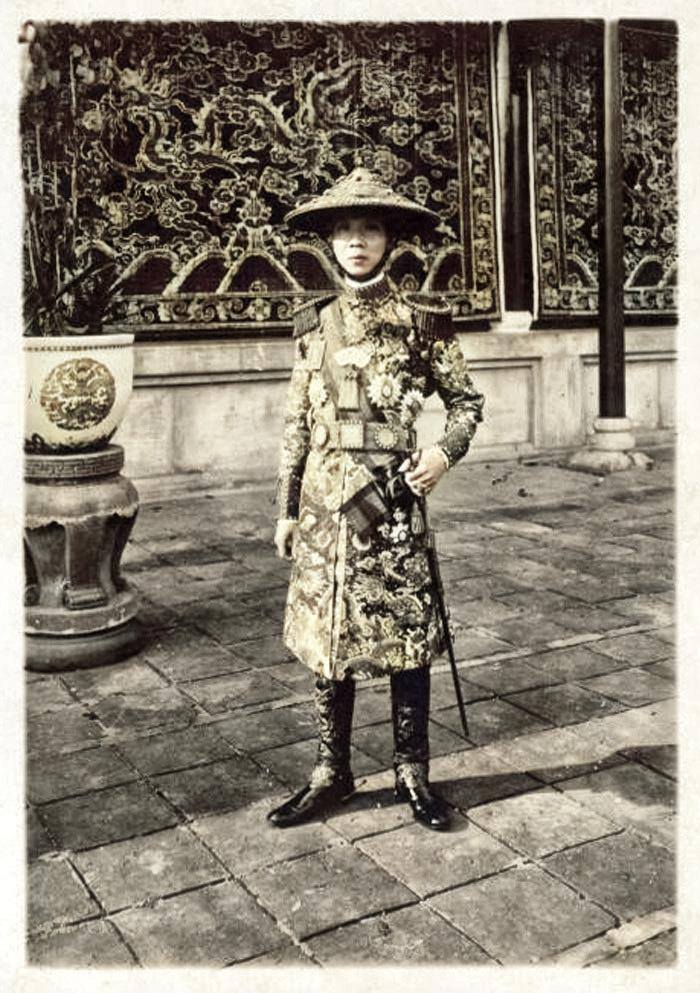
Khải Định in military uniform in 1919

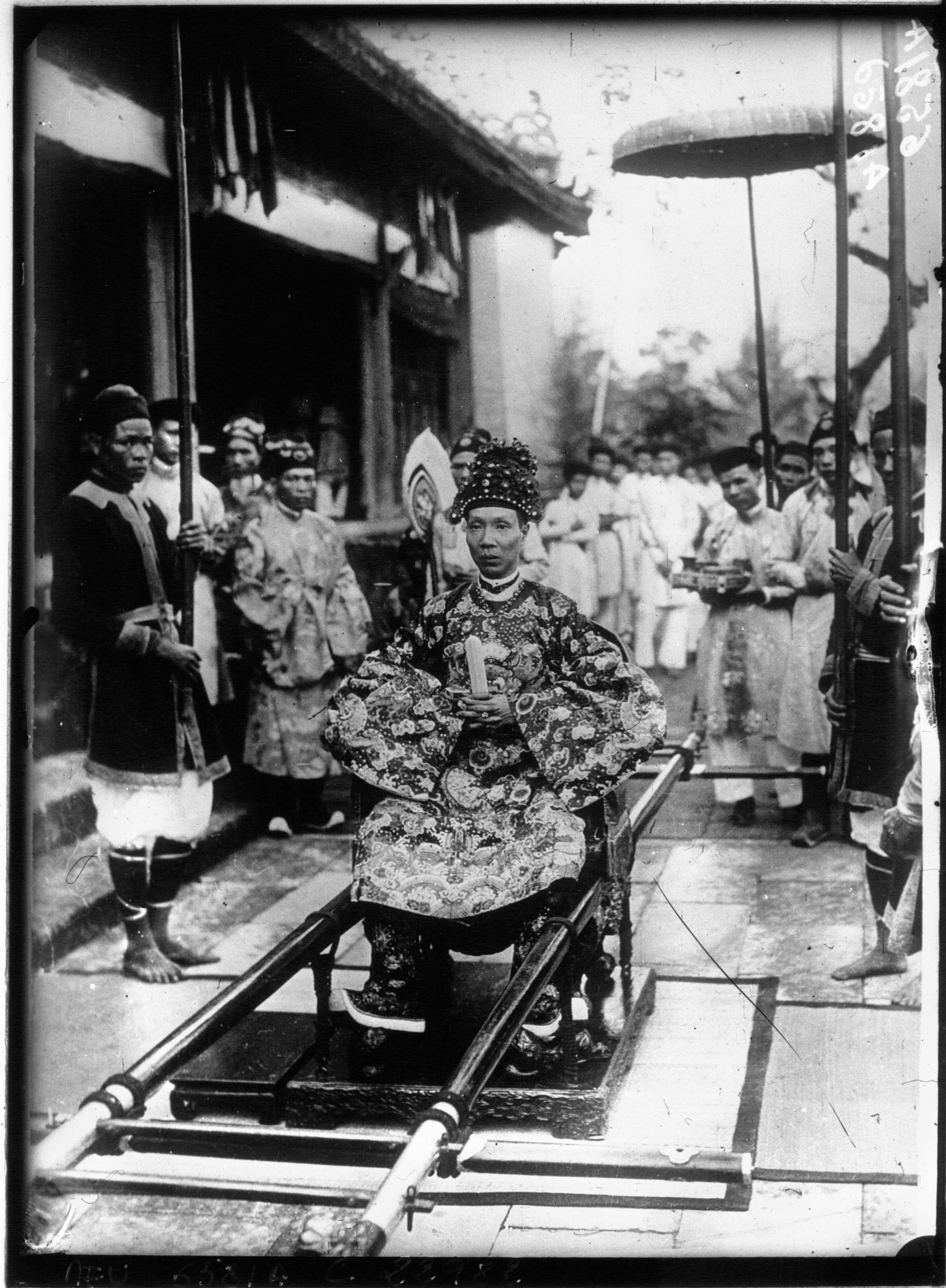
Khai Dinh in palanquin

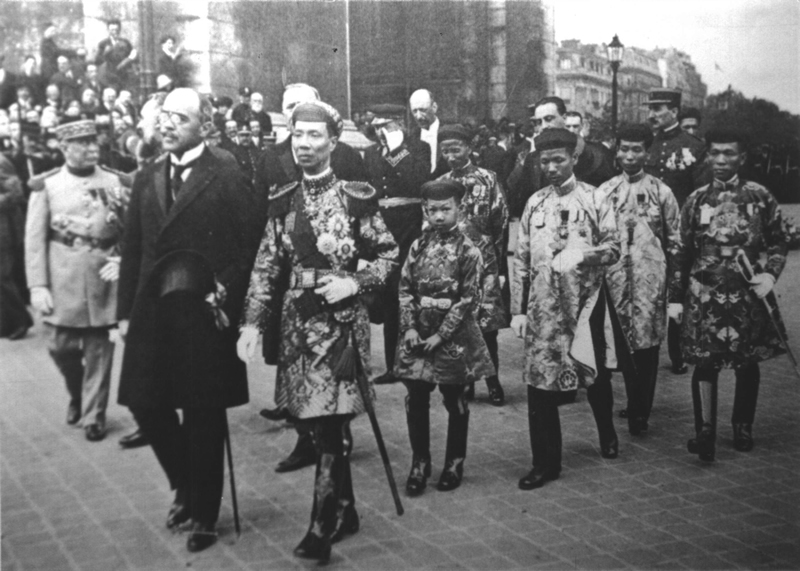
Emperor Khải Định and crown prince Vĩnh Thụy to France, 1922

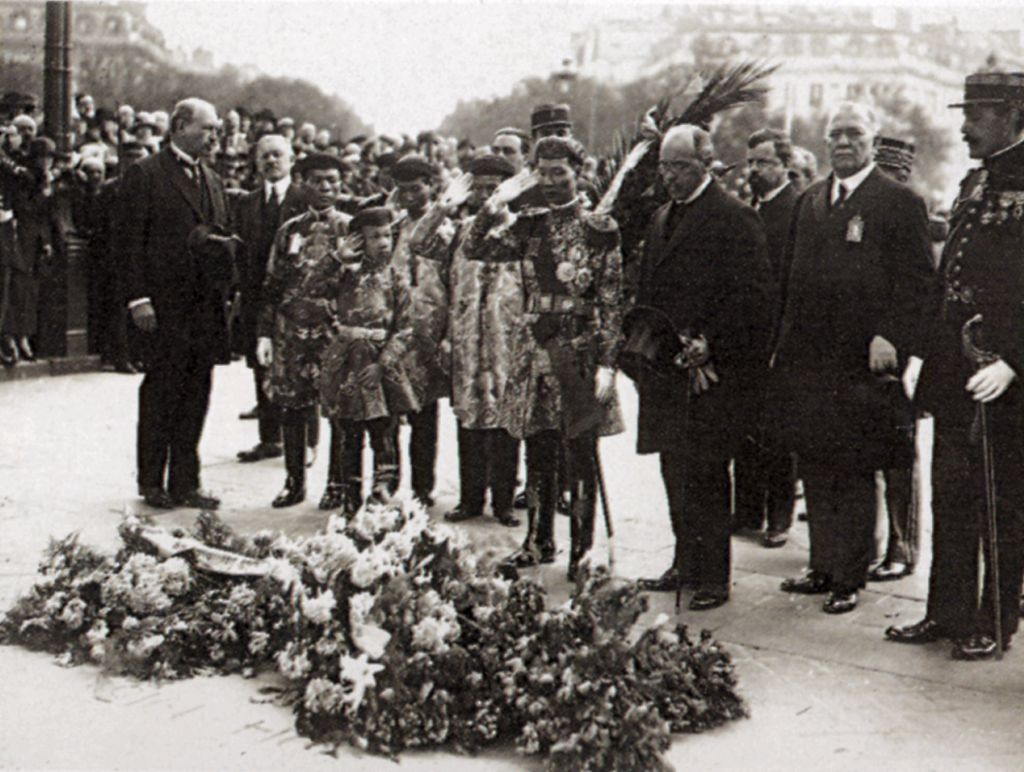
Emperor Khải Định and crown prince Vĩnh Thụy paying tribute at the Tomb of the Unknown Soldier

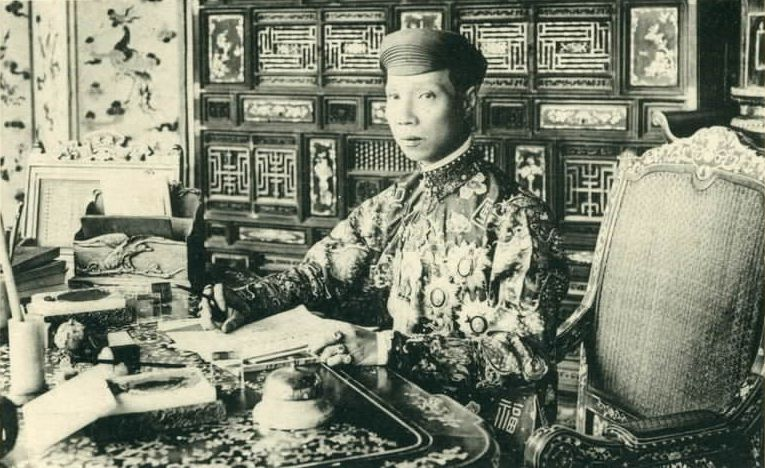
Working time of the emperor

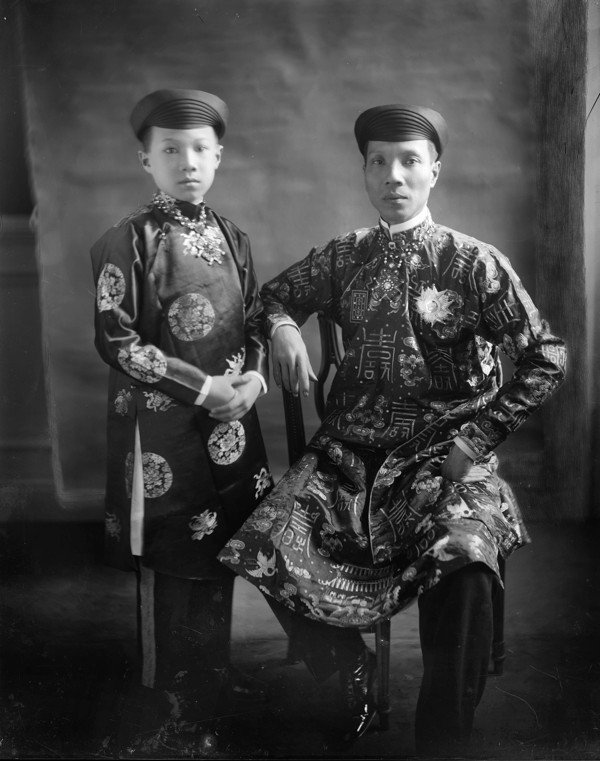
Emperor Khải Định and crown prince Vĩnh Thụy

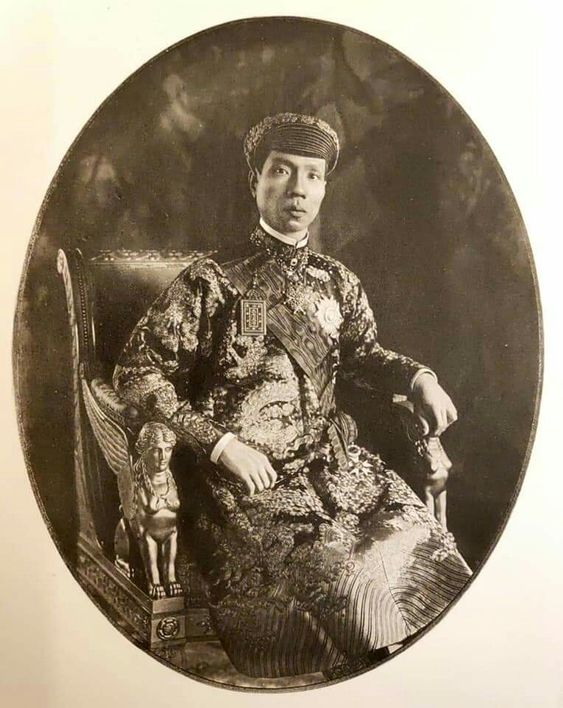
Emperor Khai Dinh

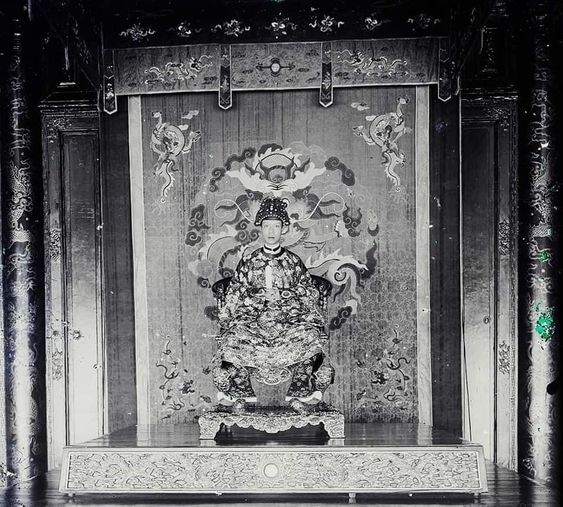
Khai Dinh on the throne

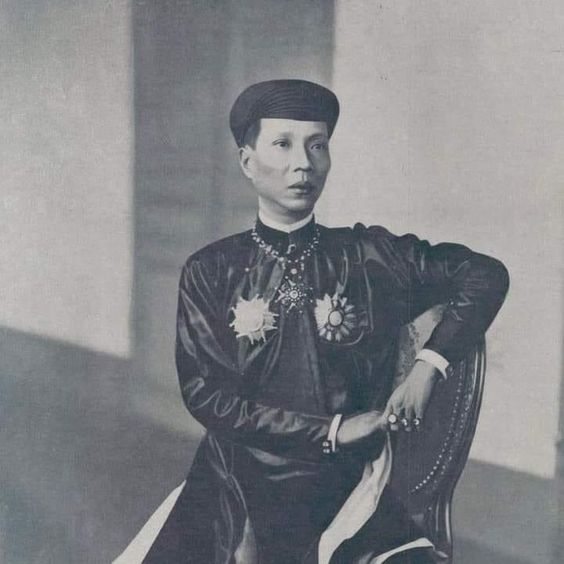
Emperor in Ao dai

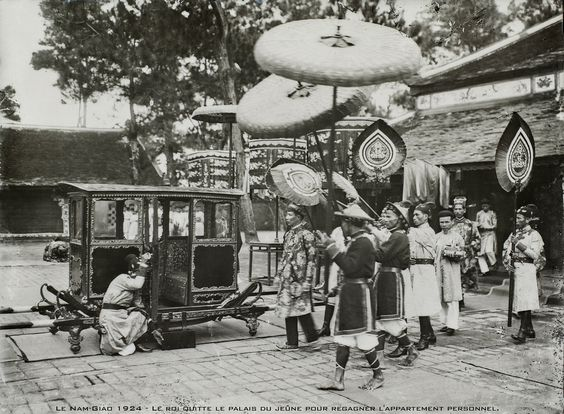
The emperor returns to the palace after Nam Giao ceremony, 1924

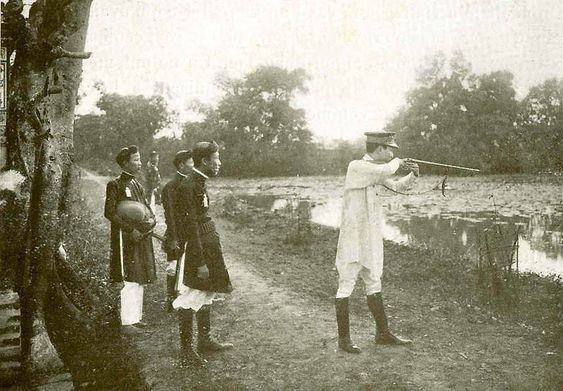
The emperor in a hunting trip at Hồ Tịnh Tâm (Tịnh Tâm lake)

== See also ==
- Tomb of Khải Định
- Khải Định Thông Bảo

Khải Định House of Nguyễn Phúc Born: 8 October 1885 Died: 6 November 1925
Regnal titles
Preceded by Duy Tân	Emperor of Vietnam; 18 May 1916 – 6 November 1925	Succeeded by Bảo Đại
