= Kien Trung Palace =

Palace in Hue, Vietnam

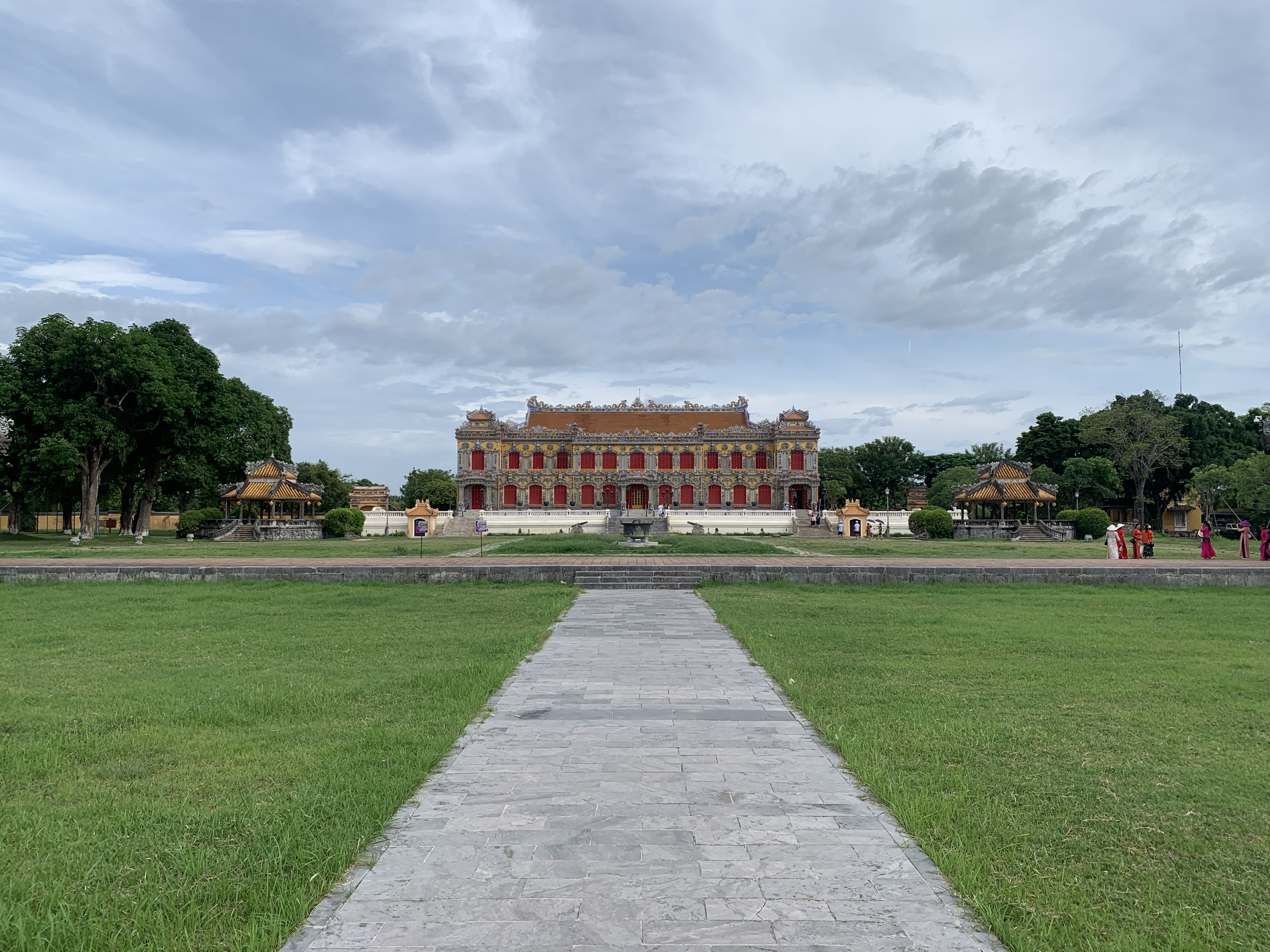
The restored Kien Trung palace (2024)

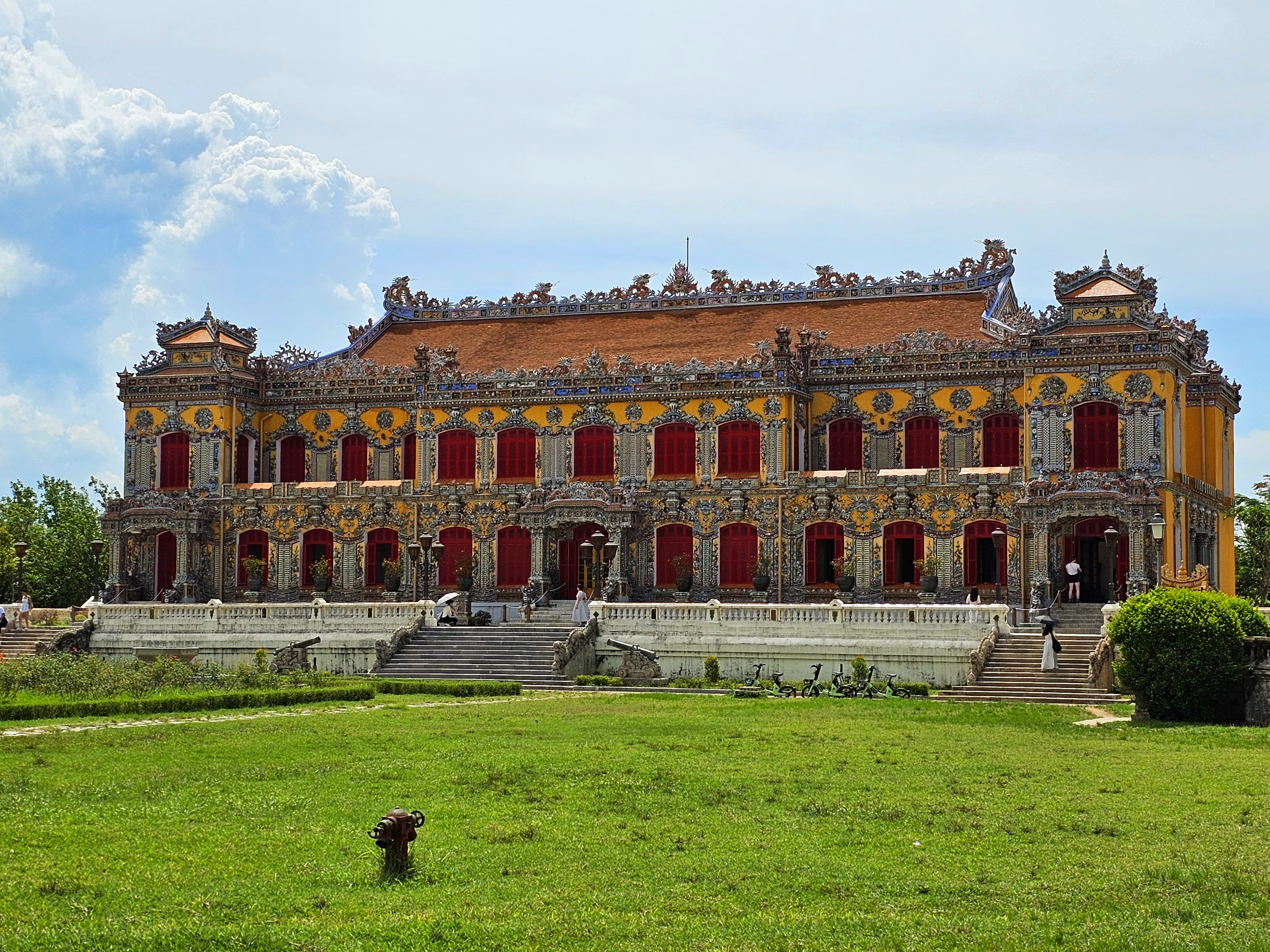
The restored Kien Trung palace

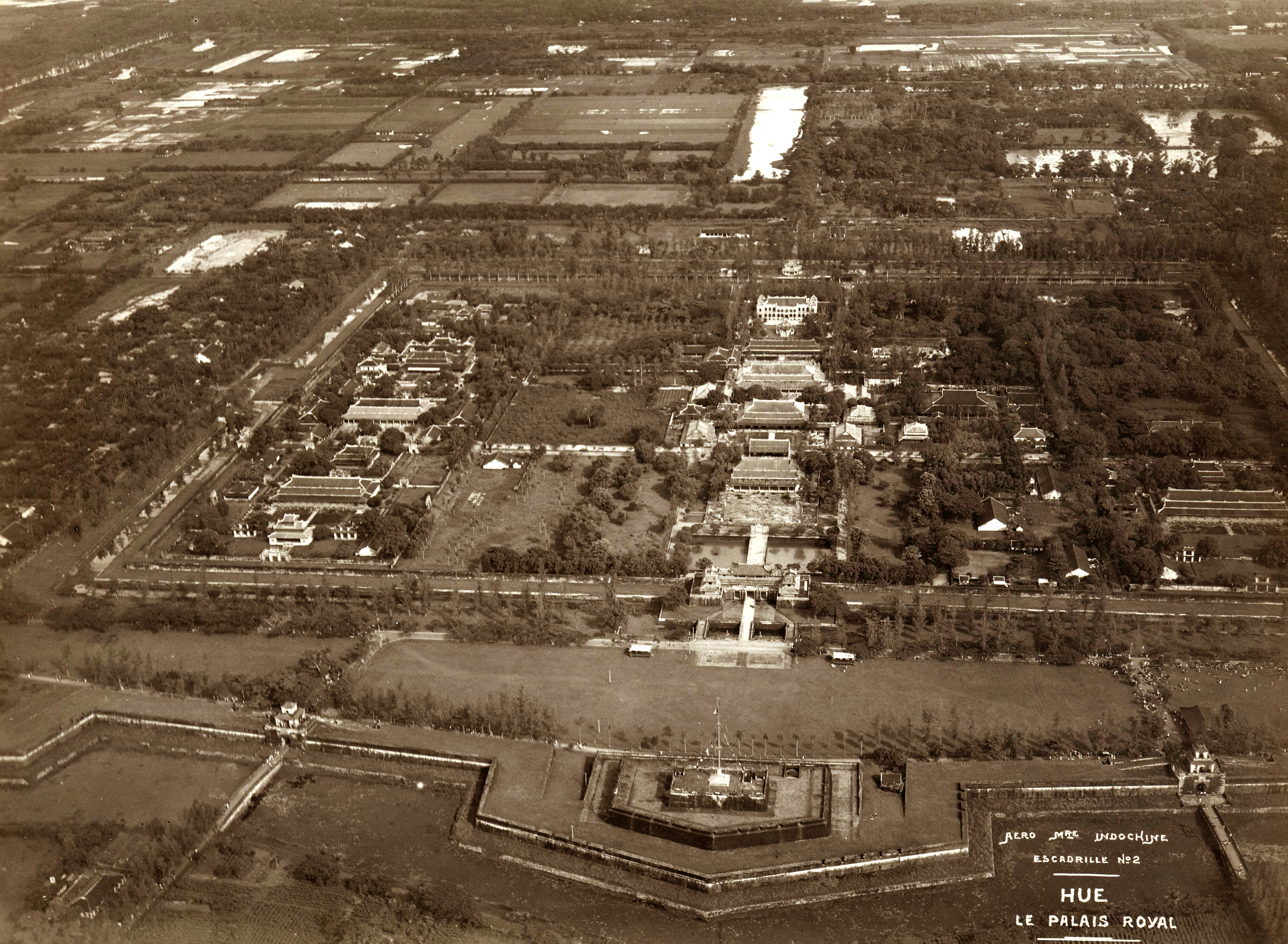
Aerial view of the imperial city of Hue with the Kien trung palace in the far north (1932)

Kiến Trung Hall (Vietnamese: Điện Kiến Trung; chữ Hán: 建忠殿) is a building within the Imperial City of Huế, the former imperial capital of Vietnam. It was the residence of the last two emperors of the Nguyễn dynasty. In 1947, the palace was destroyed by the Viet Minh during the Indochina Wars.

Reconstruction of the palace began in 2019 and was completed in 2023. The palace opened to visitors in February 2024. The palace is one of the five major structures located at the northernmost point of the central axis of the Imperial City, with the character "Kiến" (建) signifying establishment or founding, and "Trung" (忠) implying directness and non-deviation.

== History ==
The first structure to be built on the site of the Kiến Trung Palace was the three-stories Minh Viễn Pavilion (chữ Hán: 明遠樓; Vietnamese: Minh Viễn Lâu), built in 1827 for Emperor Minh Mạng and demolished in 1876. In 1913, Emperor Duy Tân built the one-story Du Cửu Pavilion (chữ Hán: 悠久樓; Vietnamese: Du Cửu Lâu), renamed by Emperor Khải Định in 1916 as the Kiến Trung Pavilion (chữ Hán: 建忠樓; Vietnamese: Kiến Trung Lâu).

In 1921, Emperor Khải Định demolished the pavilion to build the Italianate Kiến Trung hall (Kiến Trung Điện). Completed in 1923, the palace was used as the Emperor's official residence until his death in 1925. Following his death, a papier-mache model of the palace was burned at his funeral ceremony, in the hope that his residence in the afterlife would be similar to the Kiến Trung Palace.

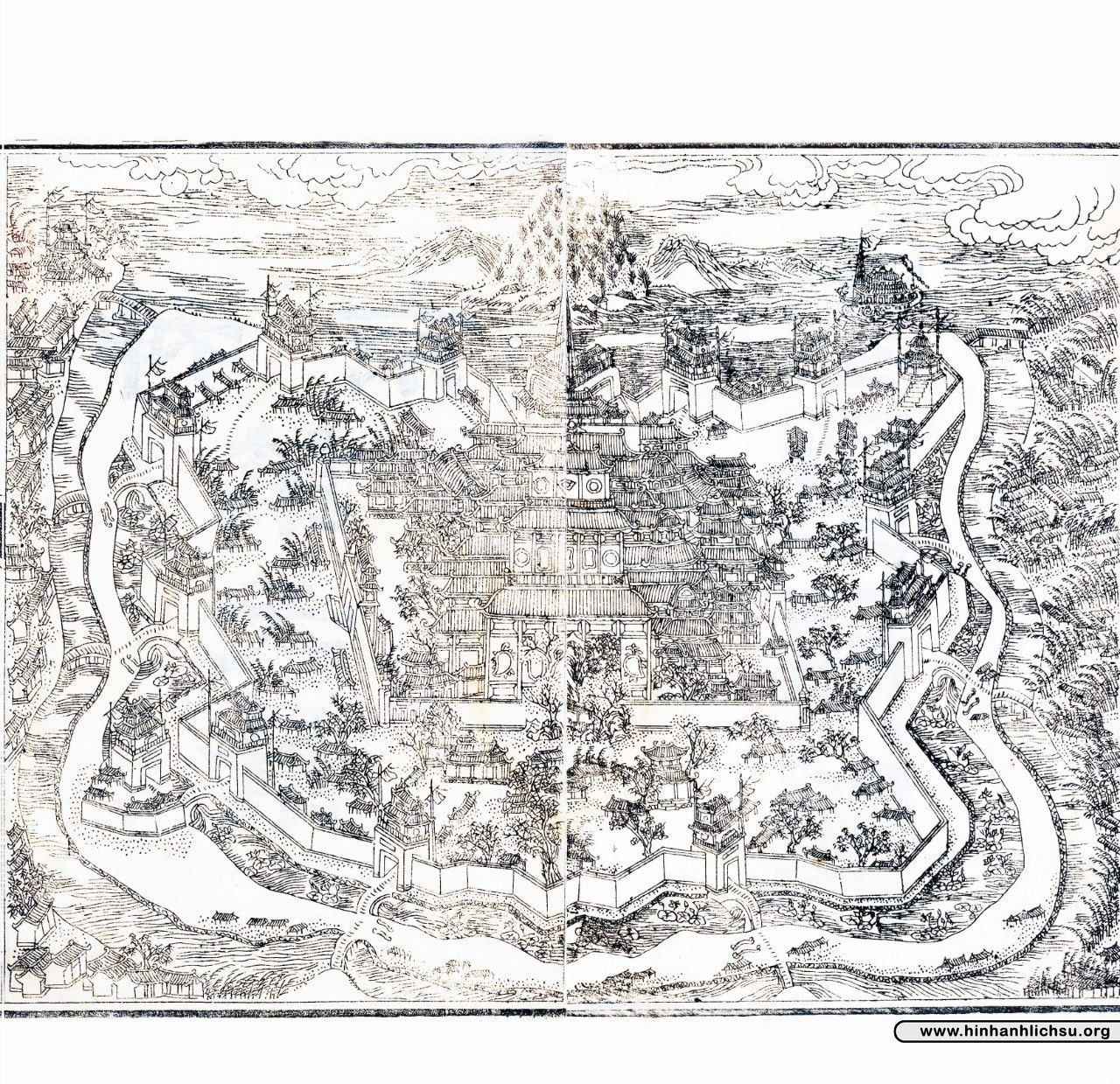
Minh Viễn Pavilion, the original building on the ground of the Kiến Trung palace, painted before 1845.

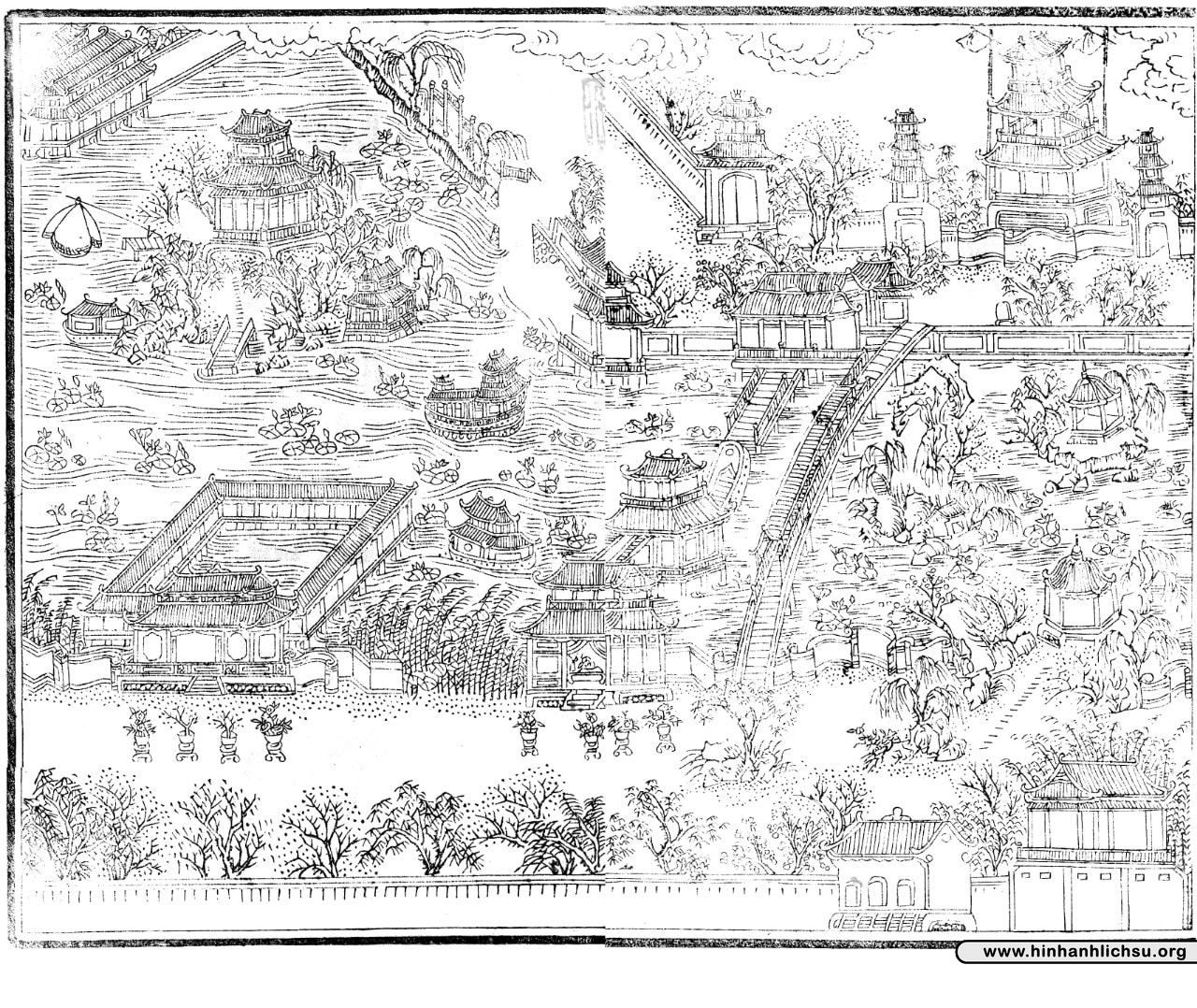
Minh Viễn Pavilion (top right)

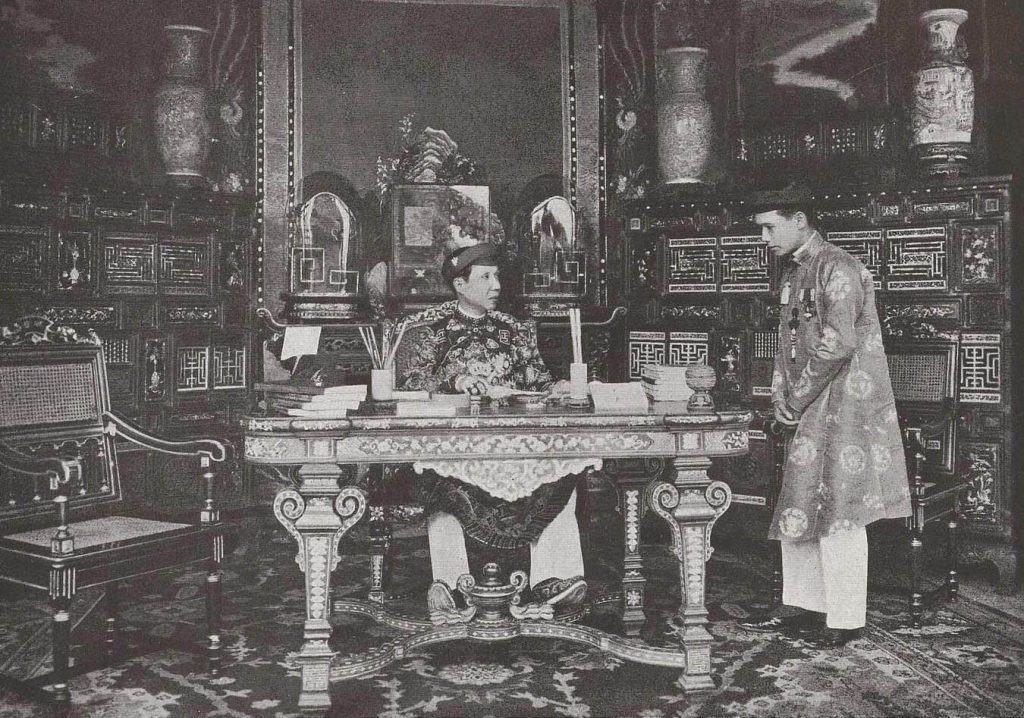
Emperor Khải Định and imperial aide Bửu Trác in Kiến Trung Palace, 1922.

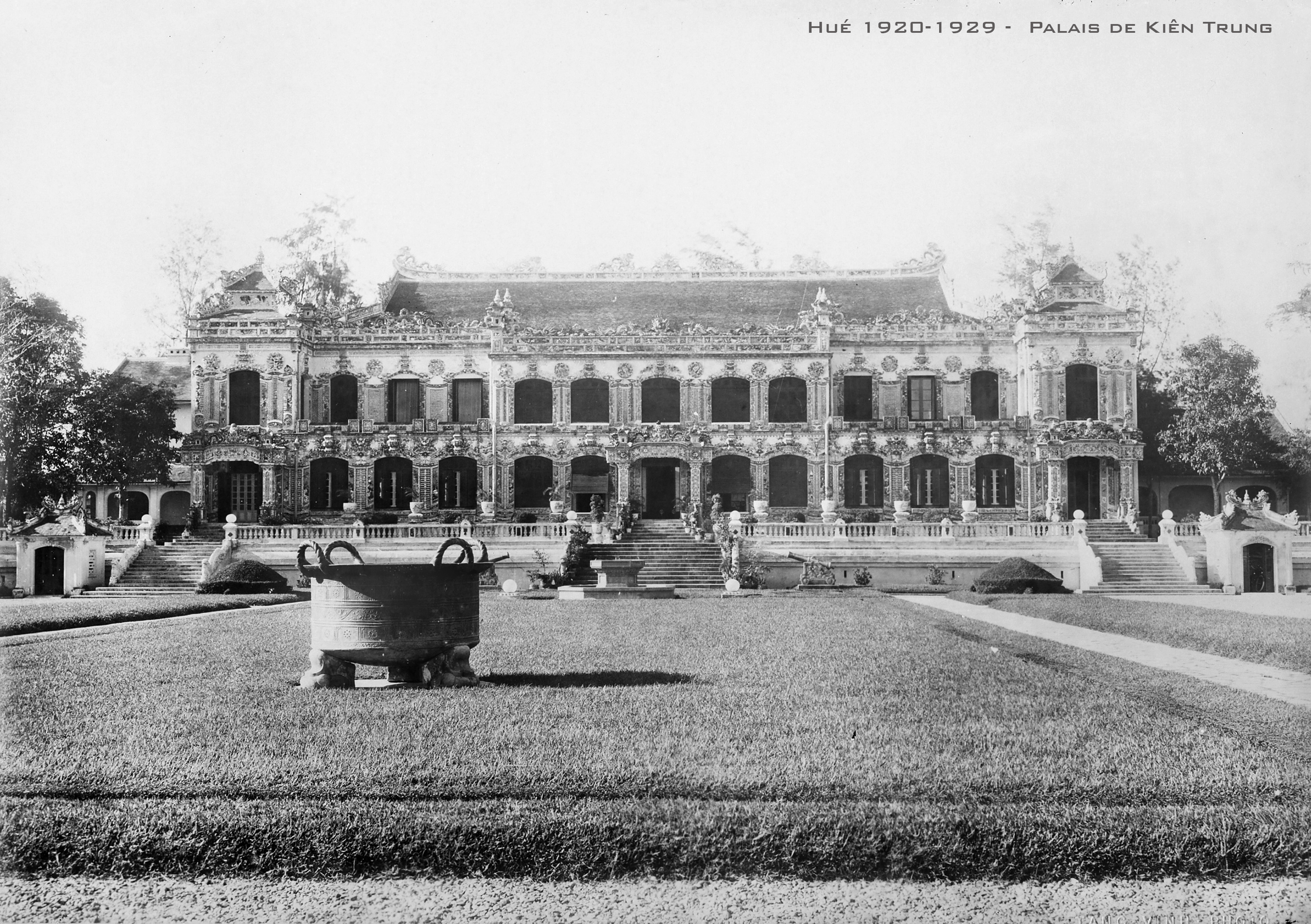
The south façade of the Kiến Trung Palace in the 1920s.

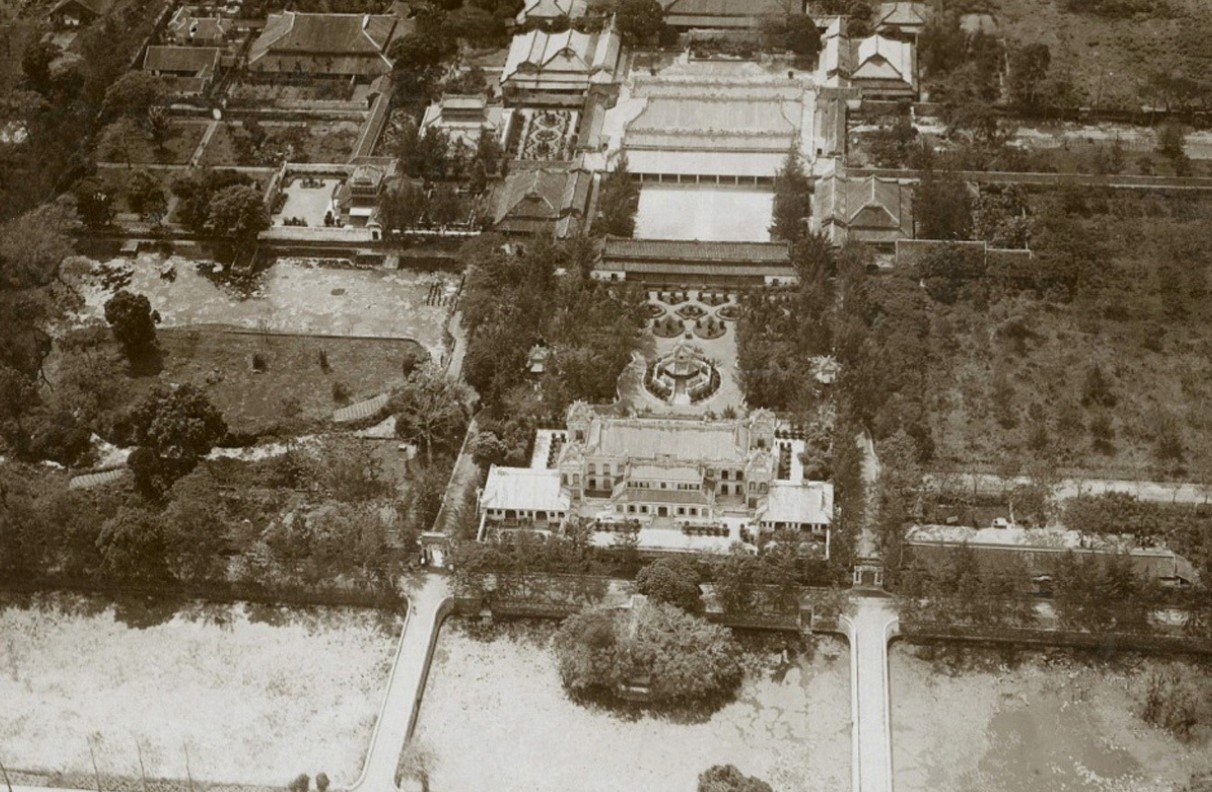
Bird's-eye view of the Kiến Trung Palace within the Imperial City.

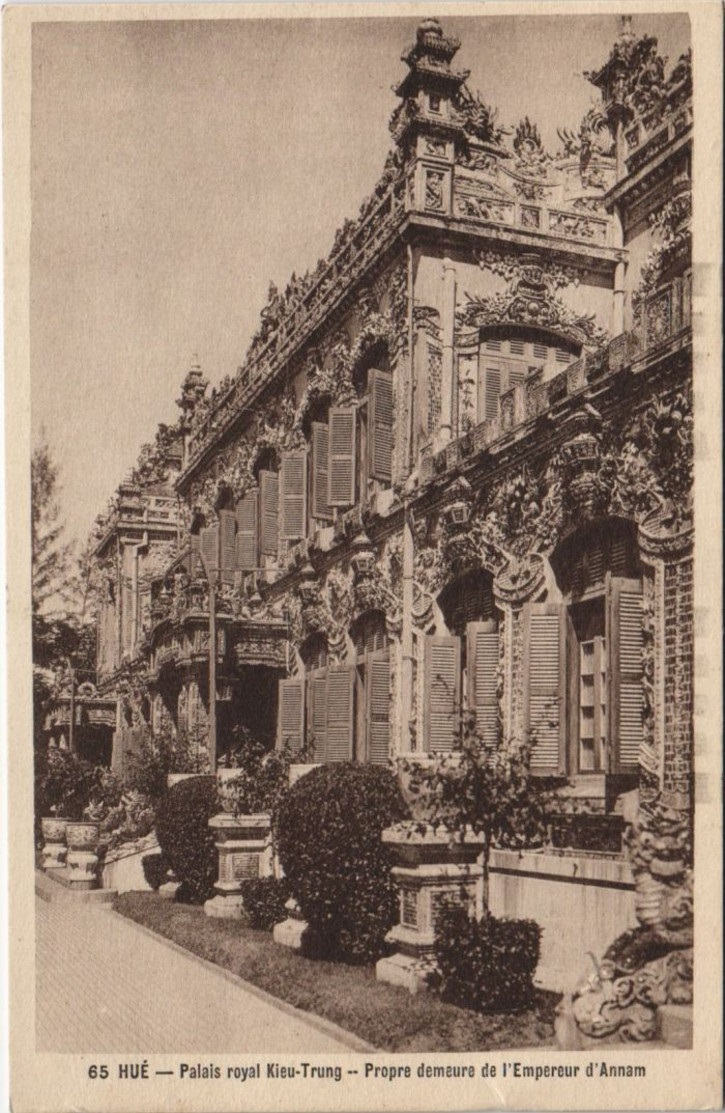
Facade

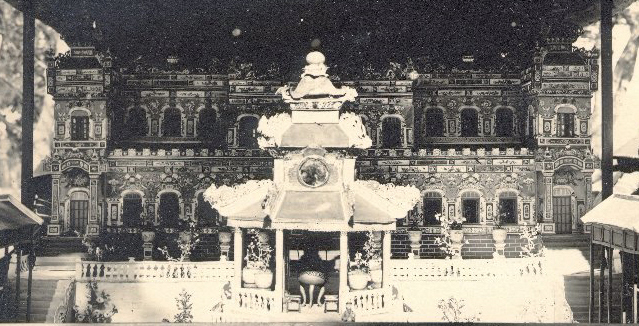
The papier-mache model of the Kien Trung palace, burned during the funeral ceremony of Emperor Khải Định.

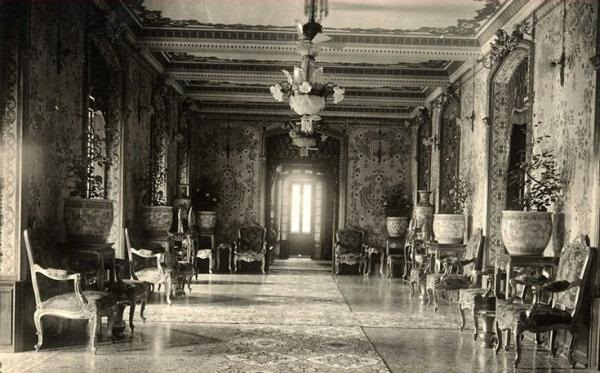
The ante-chamber of the Kiến Trung Palace in 1928.

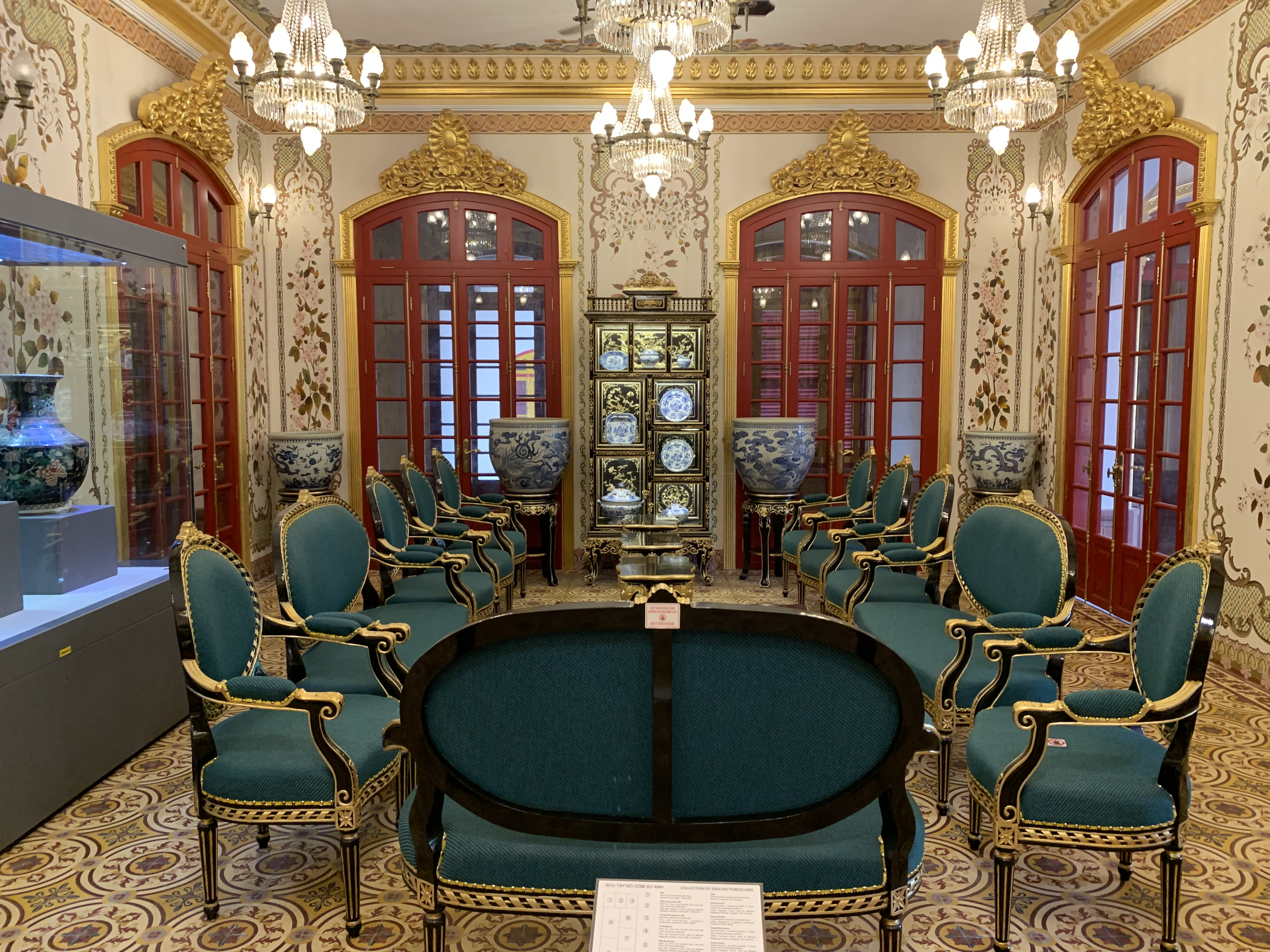
Interior of building.

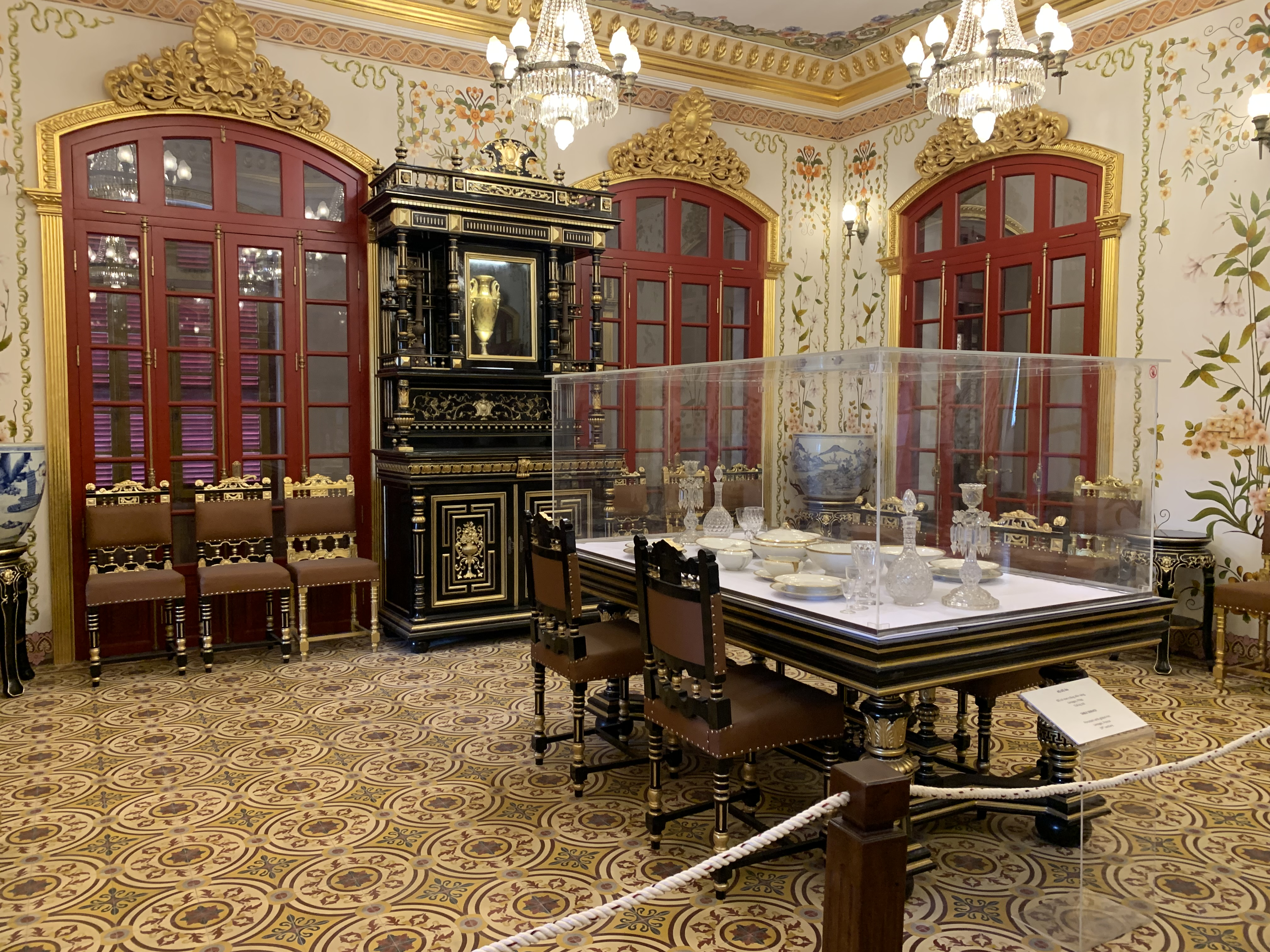
Interior of building.

Emperor Bảo Đại, together with his empress consort Nam Phương, was the last monarch to live and work in the Kiến Trung palace. Both departed from the tradition that the emperor and empress would live in separate residences. In 1932, the palace was redecorated and modernized, including the installation of modern bathroom facilities. The emperor's son, Crown Prince Bảo Long, was born at the palace at 4 January 1936.

On 25 August 1945, Emperor Bảo Đại drafted and signed his abdication at the palace. He subsequently traveled to Hanoi and later went into exile in China. Empress Nam Phương and their children moved to An Định Palace before also leaving Huế.

Between 1945 and 1947, during the anti-French resistance, the palace was largely destroyed by the Viet Minh. Only portions of the balustrades and foundation remained.

== Restoration ==
In the 21st century, the decision was made to reconstruct the Kiến Trung Palace, with an estimated cost of $5.3 million. Construction started on 16 February 2019 and was completed by the end of 2023. The palace opened to the public in 2024.

== Architecture ==
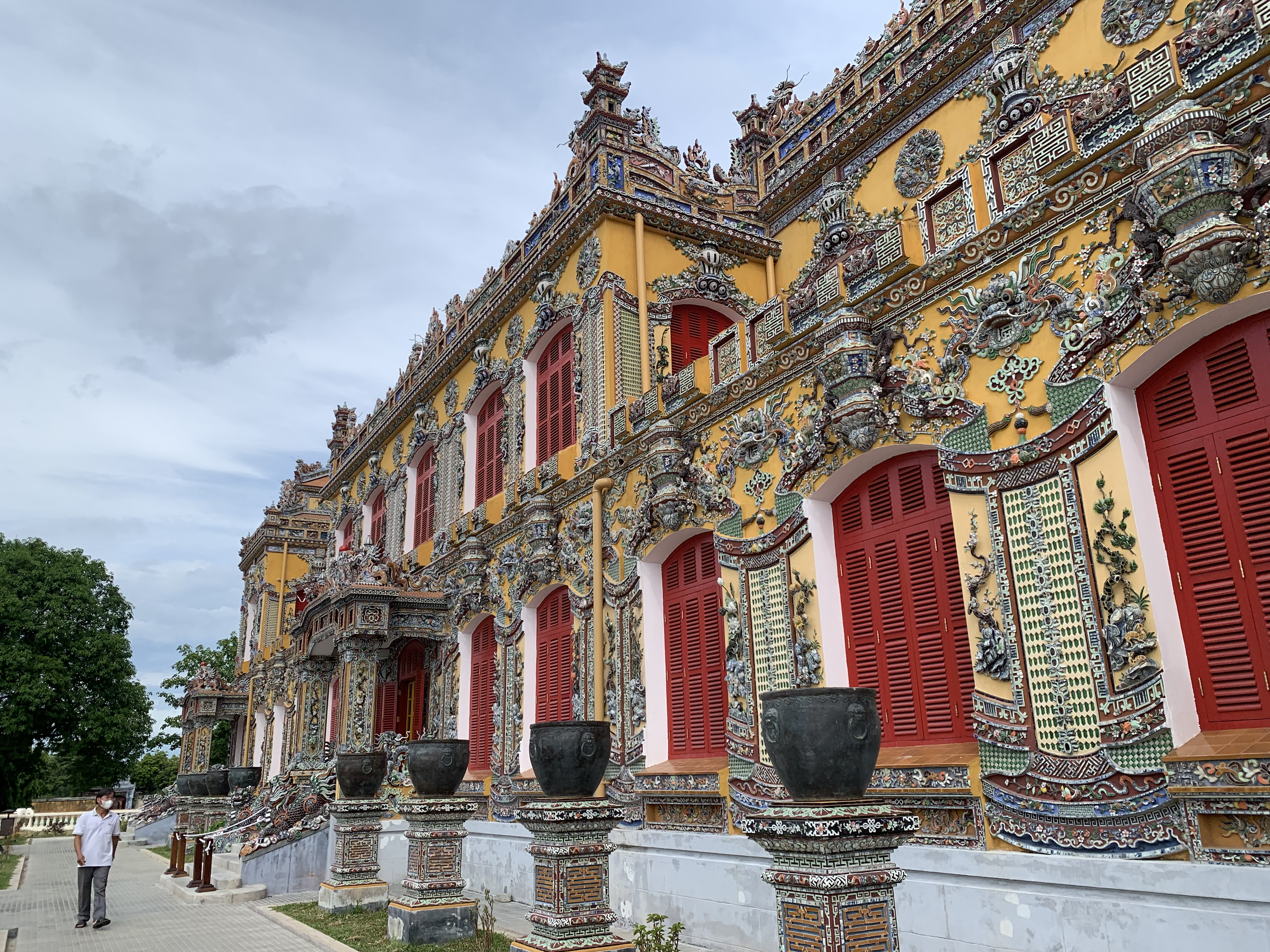
Front of the restored Kiến Trung Palace as of 2024

Kiến Trung Palace is located at the northern end of the Forbidden Purple City, along the north–south Dung Đạo axis, behind the Càn Thành and Khôn Thái palaces. It was designed in the eclectic style, combining elements of Italianate, French Baroque, and traditional Vietnamese architecture.

The palace features a long south-facing façade adorned with colorful ceramic decorations, opening onto a geometric Art Deco-style garden accessed by small stone staircases decorated with dragon and snake motifs. A balustrade with prominent French-style balusters runs the full length of the façade. The structure includes thirteen openings on both the ground and upper floors, with a central portico serving as the main entrance.

On either side, small projecting sections contain a large door on the ground floor and a large window above, both topped with traditional Asian gables. The central avant-corps has five openings per floor, while the recessed sections flanking it on the upper level each feature three openings. All windows are framed with ornate carved motifs. The roof, with slightly elevated edges, is finished with a parapet in the Vietnamese style.

== Literature ==
- Hong Lien, Vu (2015). Royal Hue Heritage of the Nguyen Dynasty of Vietnam. Bangkok: River Books. p. 272. ISBN 978-974-9863-95-4.
- Swart, Paula; Till, Barry (2015). "Between Two Worlds: Emperor Khai Dinh's Architectural Legacy". Arts of Asia. 45 (3): 117–133.
- Doling, Tim (2018). Exploring Huế. Hà Nội: Thế Giới Publishers. p. 524. ISBN 978-6047742233.
- Lau Kien Trung - Hành Trình Hoi Sinh Di Sàn (in Vietnamese). Nhà Xuất Bản Mỹ Thuật. 2024. p. 60.
