= Tomb of Khải Định =

Royal tomb of the Nguyễn Dynasty in Vietnam

Khai Dinh Tomb
UNESCO World Heritage Site
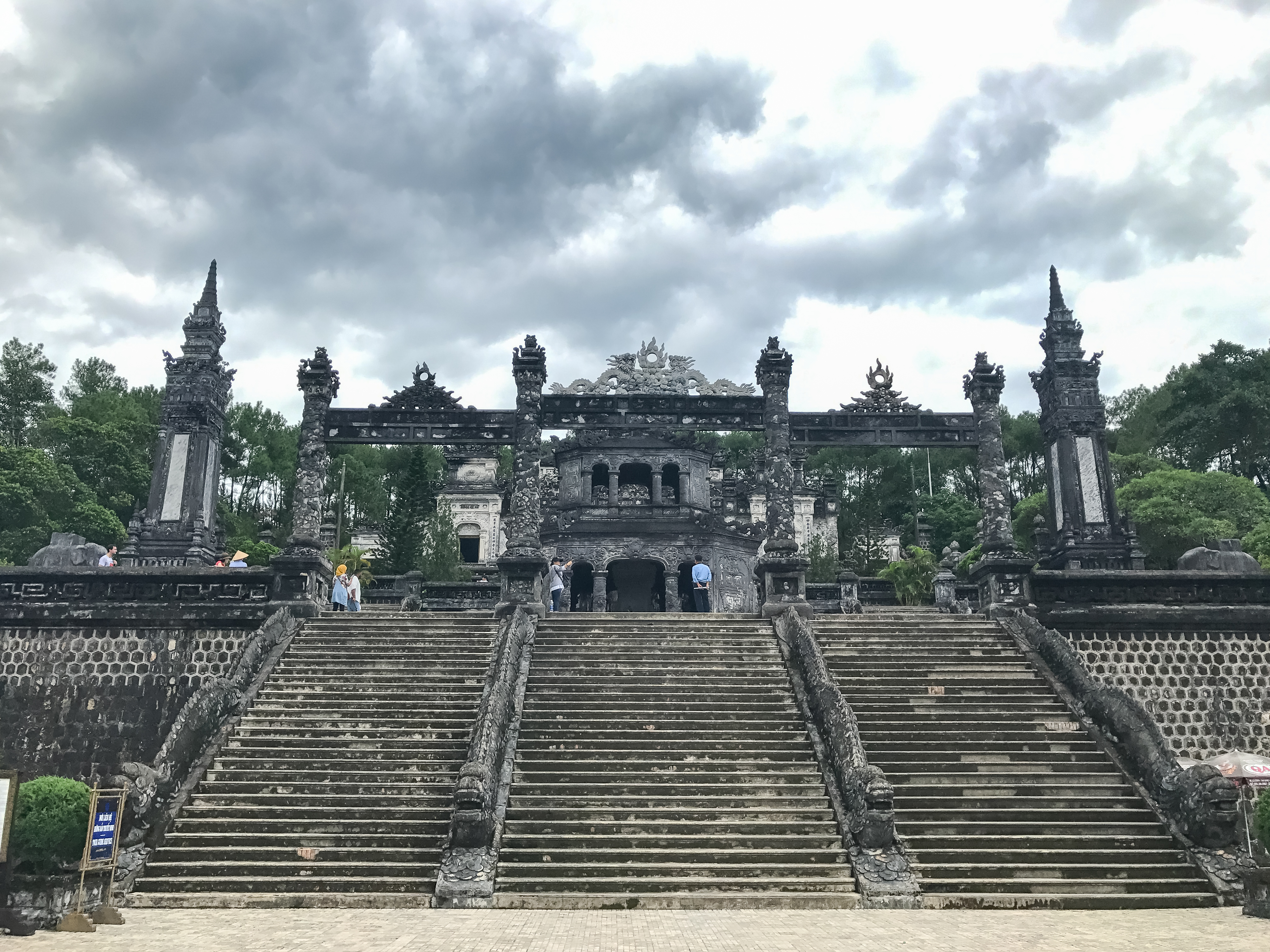
- Khai Dinh Tomb

- Location within Vietnam
- Location: Hương Thủy, Huế, Vietnam
- Part of: Complex of Hué Monuments
- Criteria: Cultural: iv
- Reference: 678-011
- Inscription: 1993 (17th Session)
- Area: 18.19 ha (44.9 acres)
- Coordinates: 16°23′56″N 107°35′25″E

The Tomb of Khải Định (Vietnamese: Lăng Khải Định, chữ Hán: 陵啓定), officially Ứng Mausoleum (Ứng lăng, chữ Hán: 應陵) is a tomb built for Khải Định, the twelfth Emperor of the Nguyễn dynasty of Vietnam. It features a blend of Vietnamese architecture with Western styles. The tomb was completed in 1931 after 11 years of construction. It is located on Châu Chữ mountain near the former capital city of Huế. The tomb became a UNESCO World Heritage Site in 1993 as part of the Complex of Hué Monuments.

== History ==
In 1916, Khải Định became the Emperor of Vietnam after his predecessor was exiled by the French colonial government. Khải Định worked closely with the government of France, and by the end of his reign he was considered to be nothing more than "a salaried employee of the French government." Due to this close collaboration, he was very unpopular amongst the people of Vietnam. Like a number of Vietnamese emperors, Khải Định desired the preparation of a tomb in anticipation of his death, but he was the last member of the Nguyễn dynasty to make this decision. Before his death, Khải Định visited France, where he was likely influenced by the architectural styles there, evidenced by the European influences in his mausoleum. In anticipation, Khải Định allegedly "raised taxes by thirty percent in order to finance the construction of the lavish tomb." However, Swart and Till argue that while the French, who controlled the nation's finances, "did increase taxes substantially during [the Emperor's] reign", they would have been unlikely to do so solely for the purpose of the tomb. Construction began on 4 September 1920 but would not be complete by the time of Khải Dịnh's death in 1925. Khải Định's three-day funeral took place in late January 1926, where a funeral procession traveled from the Imperial City to the unfinished tomb. After 11 years of construction, and six years after Khải Đinh's death, the tomb was completed under Bảo Đại, Khải Định's son and successor, in 1931.

The Tomb of Khải Định became a UNESCO World Heritage Site in 1993, along with other Nguyễn dynasty structures in Huế. It is open to the public for visiting.

== Architecture ==
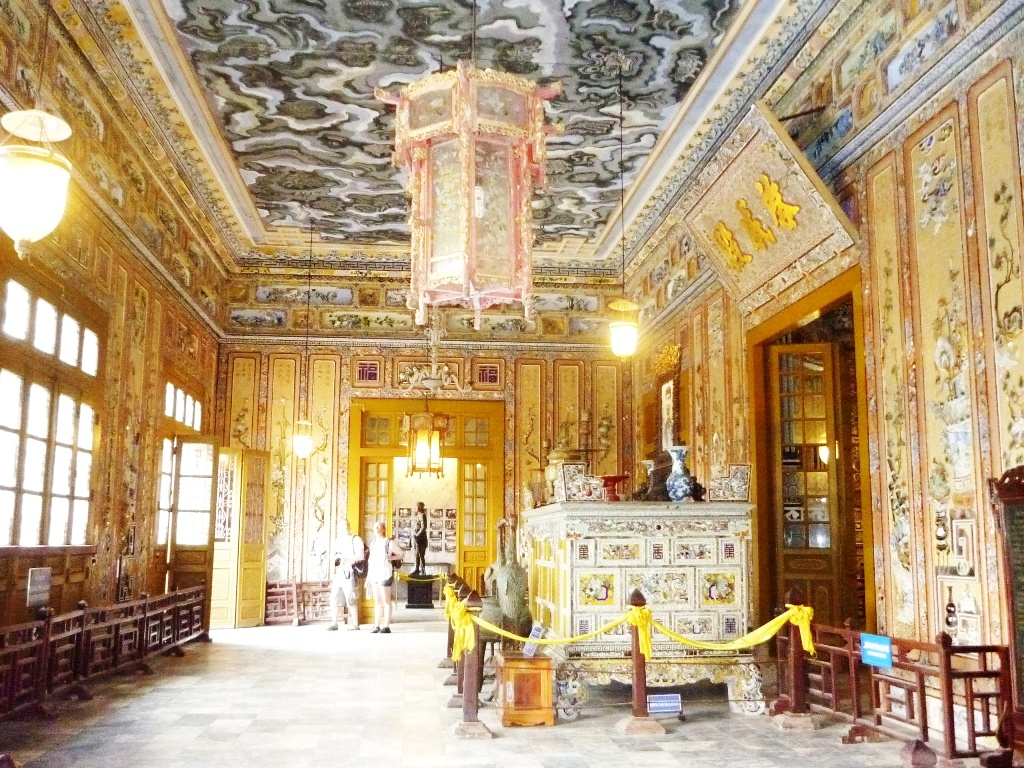
The inside of the tomb featuring porcelain art.

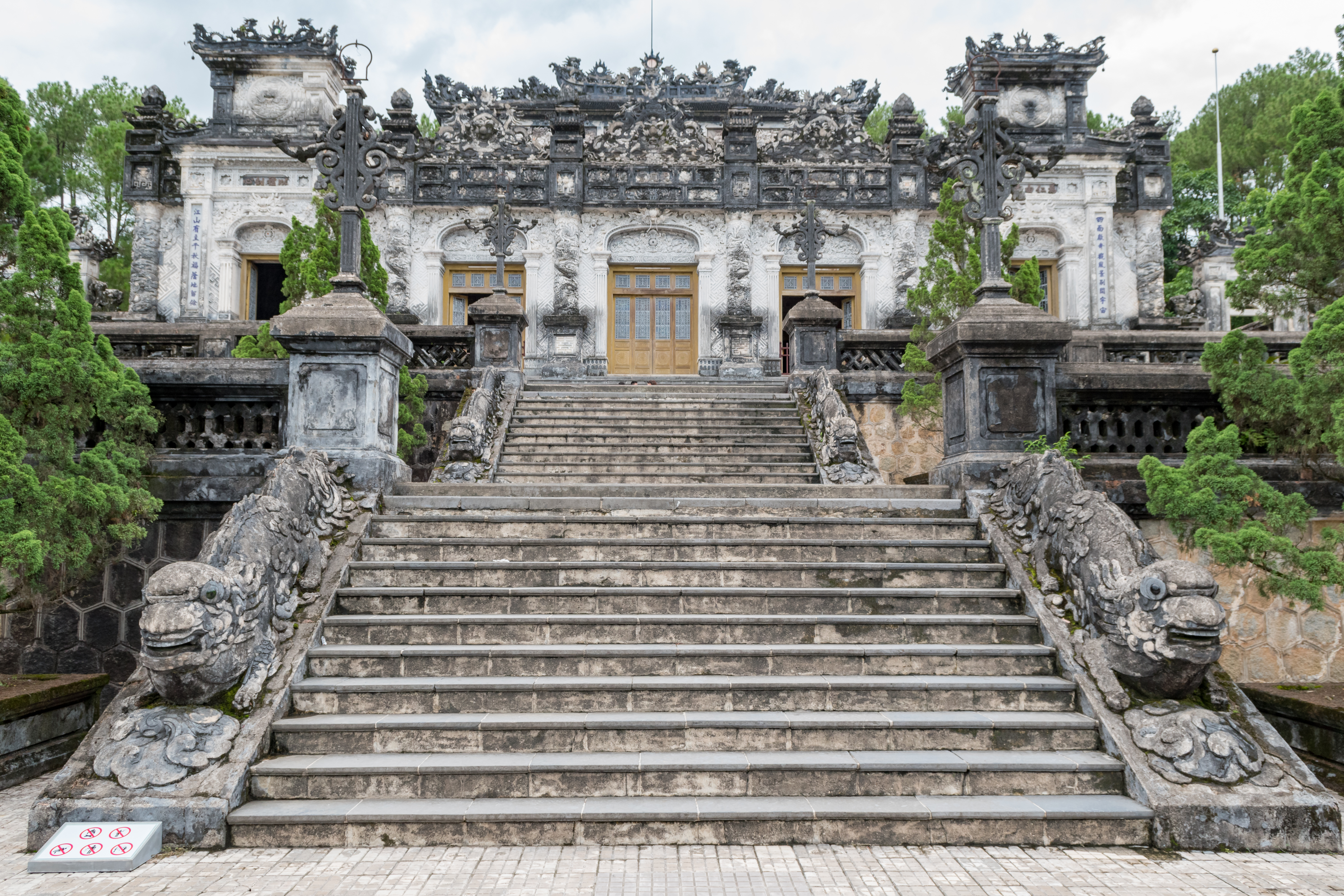
Tomb of Emperor Khai Dinh, Hue

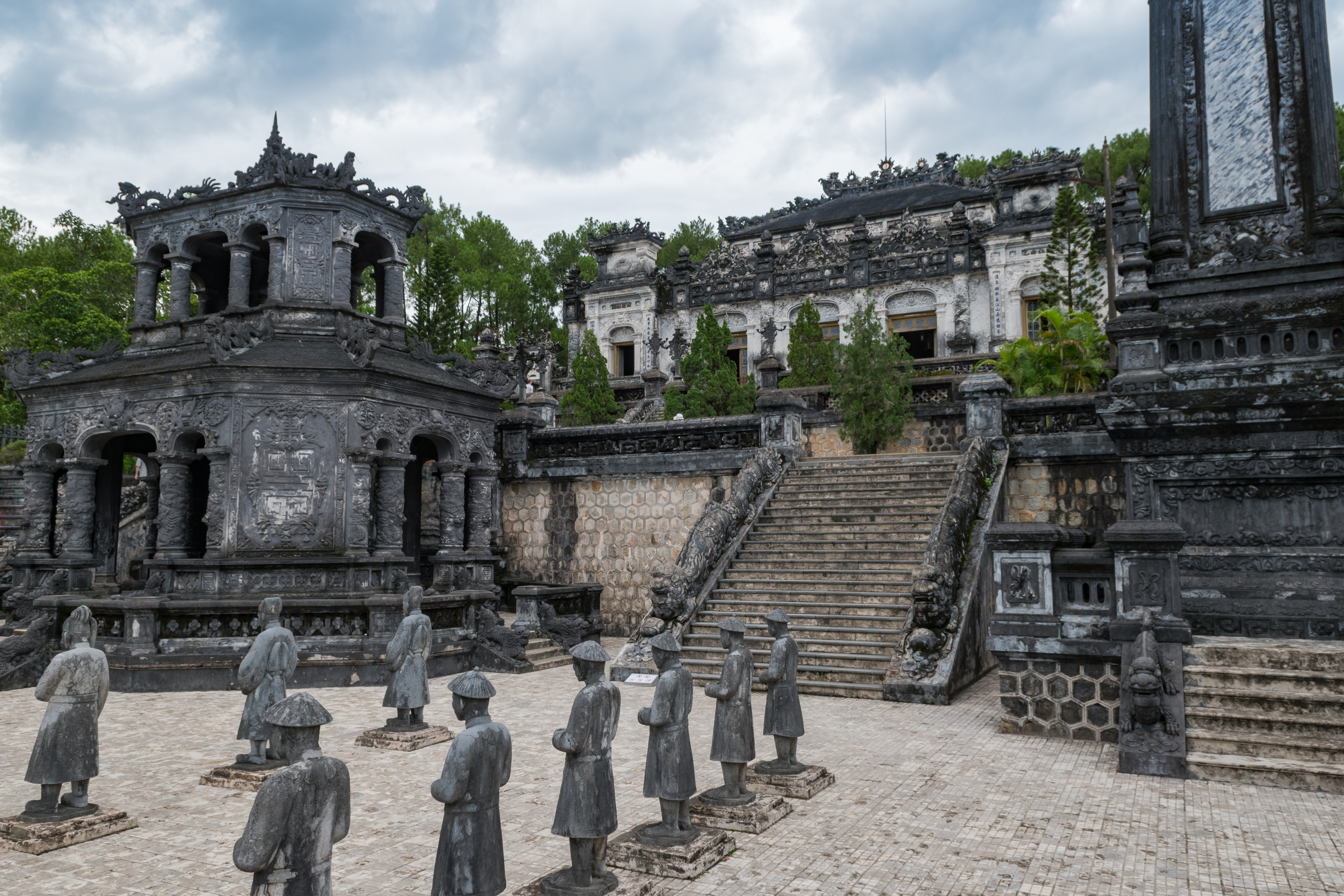
Khai Dinh Mausoleum Hue

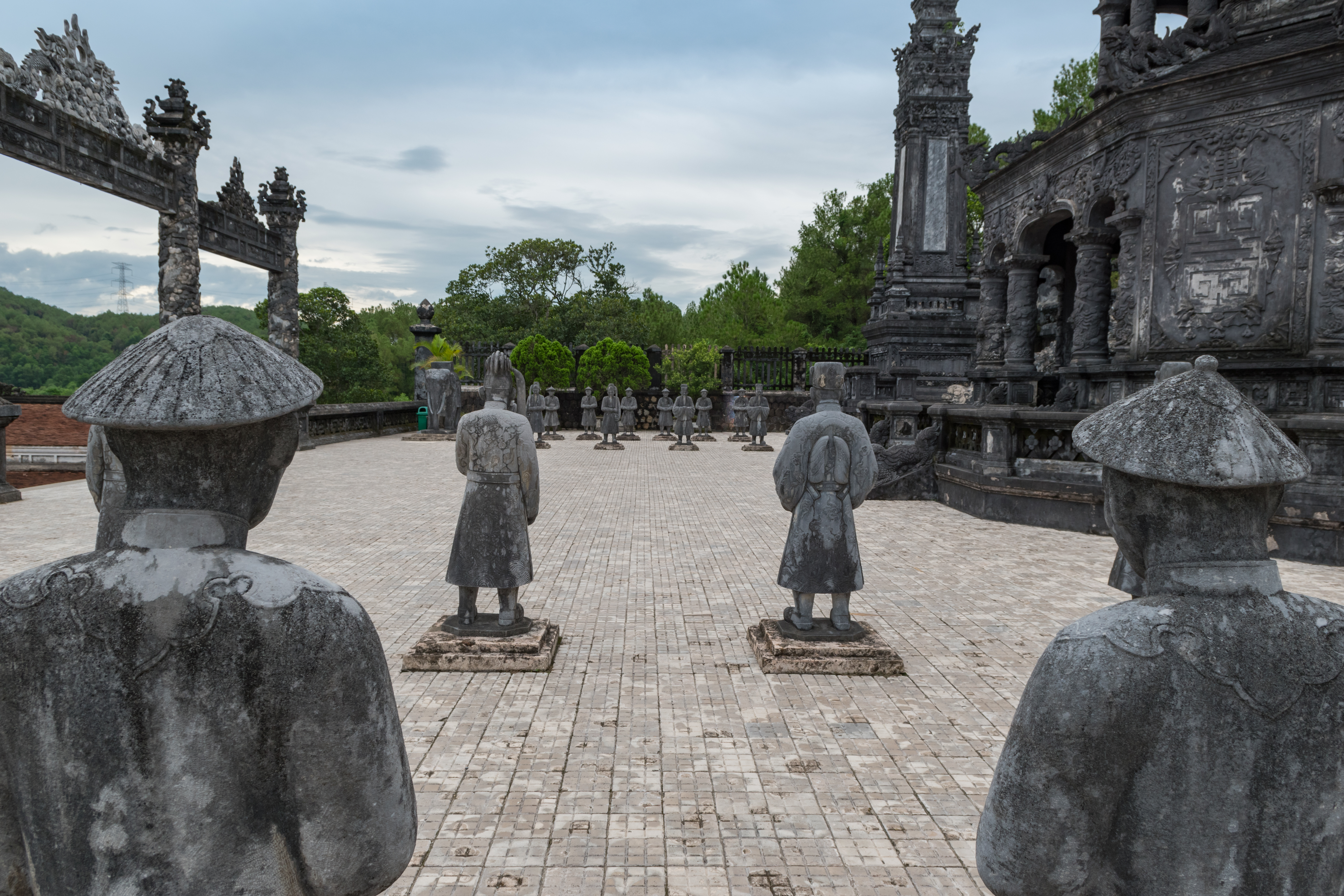
Mandarin soldiers Khai Dinh tomb Hue

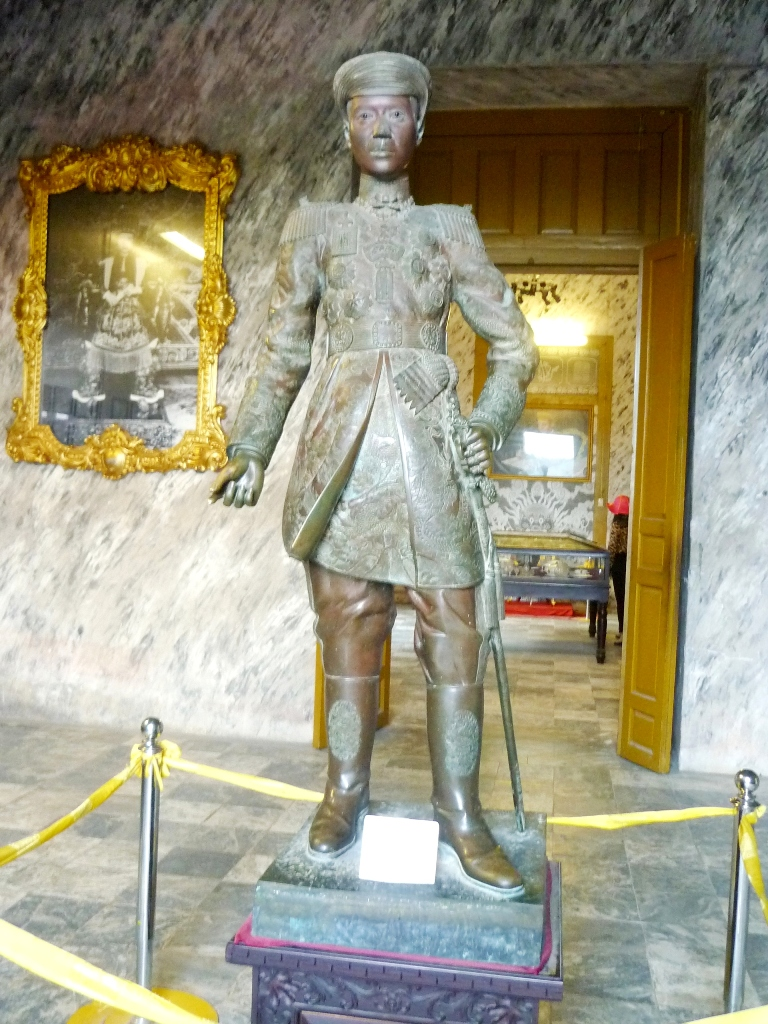
The statue of Emperor Khải Định in mausoleum

Thiên Định Palace Mausoleum

Inside tomb of Khải Định.

Khải Định's tomb contrasts from other Nguyễn dynasty tombs, not only in its much smaller size, but also with its more elaborate design, fusing Vietnamese and European styles including Baroque, Gothic and Neoclassical elements. The tomb is of a rectangular structure leaning against Châu Chữ Mountain in the outskirts of Huế. It is largely made of concrete, steel, iron, and slate, and the use of these "modern" materials, as opposed to wood or brick, "was thought to allude power and permanence." The entrance of the tomb complex features a grand staircase, which ends at the first terrace with a triple-arched memorial gateway, including images of "two five-clawed dragons contending over a flaming pearl." When closed, the entrance uses wrought iron gates made in France.

Beyond the way is a salutation court (sân chào) with two rows of stone figures and animals lining the pathway to the tomb. The stone statues, a practice originating from China, were meant to protect the grave and guide the spirit of the deceased to and from the tomb. Unlike other Nguyễn dynasty tombs, which utilized crude stone figures along single rows, Khải Đinh's tomb features more detailed officers, attendants, and animals, and its more compact area necessitated using double rows. At the end of the path is a two-tiered octagonal reinforced concrete stele pavilion (nhà bia), unique compared to other Nguyễn dynasty tombs that had square pavilions. The Western-styled building has arched column entrances, with side panels decorated with the Chinese character for longevity, shòu (壽), and surrounded by bats, representing blessings. Engraved on the stele is a biography of Khải Định written in Classical Chinese, likely authored by senior court officials but attributed to Khải Định's son and successor Bảo Đại. On each side of the pavilion are two tall columns (trụ biểu), "usually described as obelisks with a stupa on top."

=== Thiên Định Palace ===
At the top terrace is the Thiên Định Palace, which is the main structure of the tomb complex and consists of five connected halls. The grayish-white exterior "has five arched entrances flanked by pilasters and divided by prominent pillars", with the number five referencing the five elements. It is in a French colonial style, with geometric designs of swastikas, dragons, and longevity symbols carved into the stone, along with panels depicting four-character phrases taken from the Analects by Confucius. The interior of the palace "is an explosion of color with lavish embellishments throughout." The ceiling is decorated with nine intricate dragons, originally painted by royal painter Phan Văn Tánh, and its walls feature intricately designed glass and porcelain decorations. The left hall "contains a collection of Khai Dinh's personal memorabilia, including photographs, gifts from the French government, such as silver and porcelain dinner sets, bejeweled belts, swords and ornaments as well as a realistic bronze statue (life-size at 160 cm in height) of a martial-looking Khai Dinh in full regalia carrying a sword." In the center of the palace is the altar room, called Khải Thành Palace, with three sets of doors leading to a crypt and worship room. The rear room of the palace is home to a temple containing Khải Định's grave, an altar to him, and another bronze statue of his likeness seated in traditional imperial clothing, cast in Marseille.
