= Seals of the Nguyễn dynasty =

Collection of seals made for Vietnamese emperors between 1802 and 1945

Heirloom seal of the Southern Realm (Imperial Seal of the Nguyễn dynasty) Đại Nam ngọc tỷ truyền quốc
- Armiger: Nguyễn dynasty
- Adopted: Thiệu Trị 5 (1846)
- Relinquished: Bảo Đại 20 (1945) (Note: Abdication of Bảo Đại, see: August Revolution.)
- Motto: Đại Nam thụ thiên vĩnh mệnh truyền quốc tỷ (大南受天永命傳國璽, "The Great South has the eternal Mandate of Heaven, jade seal for the transmission of the legacy of the Empire") 大南受 天永命 傳國璽
- Earlier version(s): (Seal of the Nguyễn lords)
- Use: Official seal of the Nguyễn dynasty government

- Seals of the Nguyễn dynasty
- Vietnamese alphabet: Ấn triện triều Nguyễn / Ấn triện nhà Nguyễn
- Hán-Nôm: 印篆朝阮 印篆茹阮

The seals of the Nguyễn dynasty can refer to a collection of seals (印篆, Ấn triện or 印章, Ấn chương) specifically made for the emperors of the Nguyễn dynasty (chữ Hán: 寶璽朝阮 / 寶璽茹阮), who reigned over Vietnam between the years 1802 and 1945 (under French protectorates since 1883, as Annam and Tonkin), or to seals produced during this period in Vietnamese history in general (the latter are generally referred to in Vietnamese as 印信, ấn tín).

In its 143 years of existence, the government of the Nguyễn dynasty had created more than 100 imperial seals. These imperial seals were made of jade, bronze, silver, gold, ivory, and meteorite.

Imperial seals typically have inscriptions written in the ancient seal script, but by the later part of the Nguyễn dynasty period both Chữ Hán and Latin script were used for some scripts.

According to Dr. Phan Thanh Hải, Director of the Huế Monuments Conservation Centre, at the end of the Nguyễn dynasty period the Purple Forbidden City contained a total of 93 jade and gold seals. Of these

- 2 seals were from the Nguyễn lords period made under Lord Nguyễn Phúc Chu (1691–1725) in 1709
- 12 were from the reign of Emperor Gia Long (1802–1820)
- 15 were from the reign of Emperor Minh Mạng (1820–1841)
- 10 were from the reign of Emperor Thiệu Trị (1841–1847)
- 15 were from the reign of Emperor Tự Đức (1847–1883)
- 1 was from the reign of Emperor Kiến Phúc (1883–1884)
- 1 was from the reign of Emperor Hàm Nghi (1884–1885)
- 5 were from the reign of Emperor Đồng Khánh (1885–1889)
- 10 were from the reign of Emperor Thành Thái (1889–1907)
- 12 were from the reign of Emperor Khải Định (1916–1925)
- 8 were from the reign of Emperor Bảo Đại (1925–1945).

Hải stated that as of 2016 that there were no more imperial seals left in the Nguyễn dynasty capital city of Huế with most being handed over to the government of the Democratic Republic of Vietnam by Bảo Đại following his abdication in 1945 mostly now being in the hands of the Vietnam National Museum of History in Hanoi.

Dr. Phan Thanh Hải further stated that no imperial seals were produced during the reigns of Emperors Dục Đức (1883), Hiệp Hòa (1883), and Duy Tân (1907–1916).

== Overview ==
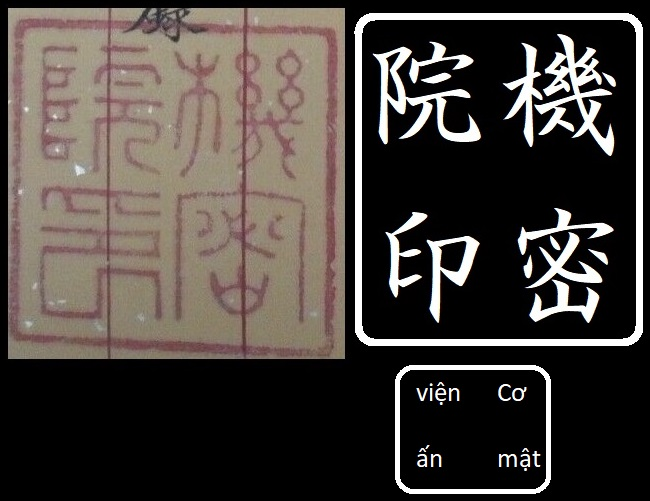
The seal of the Viện cơ mật (Nguyễn dynasty, French Indochina) with transliterations on the right to both Traditional Chinese characters (regular script) and Latin script. Government agencies and mandarins typically had their own seals.

The Nguyễn dynasty's seals are rich and diverse in types and had strict rules and laws that regulated their manipulation, management, and use. The common practice of using seals was clearly recorded in the book "Khâm định Đại Nam hội điển sự lệ" on how to use seals, how to place them, and on what kinds of documents, which was compiled by the Cabinet of the Nguyễn dynasty in the year Minh Mạng 3 (1822).

Seals in the Nguyễn dynasty were overseen by a pair of agencies referred to as the Office of Ministry Seals Management - Officers on Duty (印司 - 直處, Ấn ty - Trực xứ), this is a term that refers to two agencies which were established within each of the Six Ministries, these agencies were tasked with keeping track of the seals, files, and chapters of their ministry. On duty of the Office of Ministry Seals Management were the correspondents of each individual ministry that received and distributed documents and records of a government agency. These two agencies usually had a few dozen officers who would import documents from their ministry. Usually the name of the ministry is directly attached to the seal agency's name, for example "Office of Civil Affairs Ministry Seals Management - Civil Affairs Ministry Officers on Duty" (吏印司吏直處, Lại Ấn ty Lại Trực xứ).

Seals were also given to people after they received a noble title. For example, after Léon Louis Sogny received the title of "Baron of An Bình" (安平男) in the year Bảo Đại 14 (保大拾肆年, 1939) he was also given a golden seal and a Kim Bài (金牌) with his noble title on it. The seal had the seal script inscription An Bình Nam chi ấn (安平男之印).

=== Terminology ===
The various seals of the Nguyễn dynasty had different names based on their function, namely Bảo (寶), Tỷ (璽), Ấn (印), Chương (章), Ấn chương (印章), Kim bảo tỷ (金寶璽), Quan phòng (關防), Đồ ký (圖記), Kiềm ký (鈐記), Tín ký (信記), Ấn Ký (印記), Trưởng ký (長記), and Ký (記).

Since the Nguyễn dynasty period seals have a fairly uniform shape (with or without a handle), the uniform description of these seals in Vietnamese are:

- Thân ấn - The geometric block, or body, of the seal.
- Núm ấn - The handle for pressing the seal down on texts. In case the seal is shaped like a pyramid, there is no knob.
- Mặt ấn - Where the main content of the seal (symbol or word) is engraved, this area is usually in the face down position. The stamp surface is often used up to engrave letters or drawings.
- Lưng ấn - The face of the seal, where other information about the seal is engraved, usually in the supine position. In the case of the flat-head pyramid seal (ấn triện hình tháp đầu bằng), the flat head is the back.
- Hình ấn - A word used to indicate the impression of the seal on a text.

== Seals of the Nguyễn lords ==
Đại Việt quốc Nguyễn Chúa vĩnh trấn chi bảo (大越國阮𪐴永鎮之寶, "Seal of the eternal government of the Nguyễn Lords of the kingdom of Great(er) Viêt").

The first known seal of the Nguyễn lords had the inscription Trấn thủ tướng quân chi ấn (鎮守將軍之印, "Seal of the guardian general") and is found on letters signed by the An Nam quốc thiên hạ thống đô nguyên soái Thụy quốc công (安南國天下統兵都元帥瑞國公). (Note: Vietnam was commonly referred to as "Annam" (安南) until the mid-20th century by most foreigners, hence the use of this name when dealing with foreign governments.) This seal is known to have been produced under Nguyễn Phúc Nguyên and was used on documents created when interacting with the Tokugawa shogunate (Edo period Japan). This is one of the few lost seals of the Nguyễn (alongside the Hoàng Đế chi bảo) and the little evidence of its existence is found on a document with this seal attached to it dated with the reign era of Emperor Lê Dụ Tông of Bắc Hà is kept at the Japanese archives in the Edo Castle, Tokyo.

In the year 1709 Nguyễn lord Nguyễn Phúc Chu ordered the creation of a golden seal, this seal was 108 by 108 by 63 millimeters in dimensions. It bears the inscription Đại Việt quốc Nguyễn Chúa vĩnh trấn chi bảo (大越國阮𪐴永鎮之寶, "Seal of the eternal government of the Nguyễn Lords of the kingdom of Great(er) Viêt"; Modern Vietnamese: Bảo của chúa Nguyễn nước Đại Việt trấn giữ lâu dài). This seal classifies Lord Nguyễn Phúc Chu as a mandarin of the 2nd military rank. While the Nguyễn lords were nominally sovereign for over a century at this point, they hadn't commissioned the creation of a national seal before 1709.

On the left side of the seal was the legend Kê bát thập kim, lục hốt tứ lạng tứ tiền tâm phân (80% pure gold, weighing 6 lingots, 4 and 4/10 and 3/100 tael (= 64,43 taels = 2364 g) ), while on the right side of the seal is the inscription Vĩnh Thịnh ngũ niên thập nhị nguyệt sơ lực nhật tạo (Created on the 6th day of the 12th month of the 5th year of the Vĩnh Thịnh era (or the year 1709 in the Gregorian calendar)). The reason why Nguyễn Phúc Chu decided to use the era name of Emperor Lê Dụ Tông was because the Nguyễn lords, who ruled over Inner Vietnam, were nominally the vassals of the Revival Lê dynasty (Later Lê dynasty) in Outer Vietnam and used their reign eras and titles as a sign of submission. Nine other characters were engraved on the back edge of the base of the seal Lại bộ Đồng Tri Qua Tuệ Thư giám tạo ("Qua Tuệ Thư, dignitary of the Ministry of Internal Affairs, in charge of the supervision of the works").

As another sign of submission, the seal features a large golden imperial guardian lion as its seal knob, a heraldic element and common Buddhist symbol, as opposed to an imperial dragon symbolising imperial power. The guardian lion appears with a grinning head, protruding eyes, a half-open mouth revealing two sharp fangs, a curly mane, and a bushy tail. The ball on which the male lion's paw rests is believed to contain his vital essence. For some, the ball exemplifies the triumph of the spirit over brute force. For Zen Buddhists, it represents the unsurpassable or total perfection, Perfect Truth, full knowledge of Dharma. Others see in this object the "wish-granting pearl", one of the "Eight Treasures" which symbolizes purity.

While Nguyễn Phúc Chu requested the Kangxi Emperor of the Qing dynasty to recognise the independence of the Nguyễn lords country, and was rejected, he kept using a seal with the inscription Tổng trấn Tướng quân chi ấn ("Seal of the governor-general") on documents and dating them with the Lê dynasty calendar. During the reign of Nguyễn Phúc Chu the Nguyễn would continue to refer to themselves as "Lords" (主, or alternatively 𪐴) as opposed to the Trịnh lords who already called themselves "Kings" (王) at this point in time.

While the Nguyễn lords were gifted a seal with the inscription Tổng trấn Tướng quân chi ấn by the Revival Lê dynasty before to use in communications between them and the imperial court, but in 1744 Nguyễn Phúc Khoát proclaimed himself a "King" (王, Vương) and started using a seal with the inscription Quốc Vương chi ấn (國王之印, "Seal of the King of the nation") instead.

The Đại Việt quốc Nguyễn Chúa vĩnh trấn chi bảo seal was lost and recovered several times during the many wars fought by the Nguyễn lords, including being lost in a river once when the Lordly Nguyễn army was in retreat.

The Đại Việt quốc Nguyễn Chúa vĩnh trấn chi bảo was seen as a precious family heirloom and was kept passed down the Nguyễn family long after the Nguyễn lords were ousted by the Tây Sơn dynasty and was later the imperial seal of the Nguyễn dynasty until the 1840s.

When Nguyễn Phúc Ánh declared himself King of the Revival Nguyễn Lords state in 1780 in Saigon, he used the Đại Việt quốc Nguyễn Chúa vĩnh trấn chi bảo seal and the Cảnh Hưng era date of the Revival Lê dynasty state to showcase his allegiance to the Lê when fighting the Tây Sơn.

The Đại Việt quốc Nguyễn Chúa vĩnh trấn chi bảo seal was used by Gia Long on a funeral prayer document for Pigneau de Béhaine now preserved in Paris.

== Seals during the Nguyễn dynasty period ==
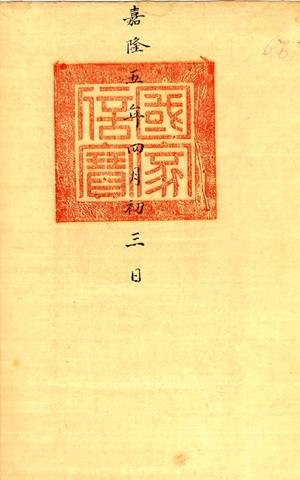
An impression of the Quốc gia tín bảo (國家信寶) seal on a document dated to the Gia Long period.

=== Imperial seals ===
After becoming Emperor in 1802 with the establishment of the Nguyễn dynasty, Emperor Gia Long decided to continue using the Đại Việt quốc Nguyễn Chúa vĩnh trấn chi bảo seal. It was carefully kept in a box out of sight and, unlike the other imperial seals, kept in the Trung Hoà Palace, the sovereign's personal residence located in the Purple Forbidden City. The imperial seal was not presented to court until the enthronement of a new sovereign.

According to the historian Lê Văn Lan the Emperors of the Nguyễn Dynasty, like the earlier monarchs of Vietnam, all took their seals as the symbol of the supreme governmental power of both themselves and the monarchy as a whole. Besides the imperial seals that were used in government administration, there were also special seals carved that symbolise titles, which usually went with a golden book (or "Kim Sách"), specific seals for worship ceremonies (for dead Emperors), or special seals that were exclusively stamped on poems or paintings.

Because the Emperors of the Nguyễn dynasty were all personally very much involved in the affairs of the state they produced a large number of seals each for very specific functions and most could be handed over to their successors. These seals sometimes only represent the emperor himself as an individual, and sometimes they also act as representatives of the imperial court. From the content of the seals used by the Emperors privately, it can be seen that the numerous different seals of the Nguyễn Empire were used on different occasions.

In the third month of the year Bính Tý, or Gia Long 15 (1816), Emperor Gia Long instructed the court to create special clothes, hats, and seals for himself and the crown prince to denote independence from China. These regalia all depicted five-clawed dragons (蠪𠄼𤔻, rồng 5 móng), in Chinese symbolism (including Vietnamese symbolism) five-clawed dragons are symbols of an Emperor, while four-clawed dragons are seen as symbols or kings. To denote the high status of Emperor all monarchial robes, hats, and seals were adorned with five-clawed dragons and ordered the creation of new seals with five-clawed dragons as their seal knobs to showcase imperial legitimacy. Meanwhile, the wardrobes and other symbols of vassals and prices were adorned with four-clawed dragons symbolising their status as "kings".

During the reign of Gia Long seals were produced with the inscriptions Chế cáo chi bảo (制誥之寶), Quốc gia tín bảo (國家信寶), Mệnh đức chi bảo (命德之寶), Phong tặng chi bảo (封贈之寶), Sắc chính vạn dân chi bảo (敕正萬民之寶), Thảo tội an dân chi bảo (討罪安民之寶), Trị lịch minh thời chi bảo (治歷明時之寶), and Ngự tiền chi bảo (御前之寶).

During the reign of the Minh Mạng Emperor many kinds of seals were made from different materials, each for specific purposes.

Inscriptions used by previous dynasties were at times also re-used when producing new imperial seals. For example, an imperial seal with the inscription Sắc mệnh chi bảo (敕命之寶) was first created at the time of the Mongol invasions of Đại Việt and Champa during the reign of Trần Thái Tông of the Trần dynasty and was used to stamp documents ordering or declaring royal (or imperial) ordinances during the early days of the war. The Trần dynasty period Sắc mệnh chi bảo seal was made of wood, but later versions of the Sắc mệnh chi bảo were primarily made of silver and gold. Precious metal Sắc mệnh chi bảo seals were made during Later Lê, Mạc, Revival Lê, and Tây Sơn dynasties. Under Minh Mạng a Sắc mệnh chi bảo seal was made for the Nguyễn dynasty, this seal was used on imperial ordinances until 1945. Furthermore, the seals of the Nguyễn lords such as the Thủ tín thiên hạ văn vũ quyền hành (取信天下文武權行, "Win the trust of all under heaven, seal for military texts.") also remained in common use until the year Minh Mạng 9.

It wasn't until the year Minh Mạng (1822) that rules were laid out for how, when, and where seals had to be used on official documents. Modern scholarship based on the books "Khâm định Đại Nam hội điển sự lệ" and "Minh Mệnh chính yếu" concluded that the first stamps of a document were reserved for the Thủ tín thiên hạ văn vũ quyền hành, Quốc gia tín bảo, Văn lý mật sát, Ngự tiền chi bảo. These imperial seals were all cast in either gold or silver and were considered to be national treasures. Gold seals were often prominently placed on the era dates to signify the importance of the Emperor and the official nature of the document. The Văn lý mật sát seal was used to enclose important words, corrections, and revisions of different versions, threads, chapters, and books. The role of this precaution was to re-verify the corrections, fixes, additions, and to avoid unlawful fabrication. Separate rules also existed for when a seal was allowed to be stamped with either red ink or black ink.

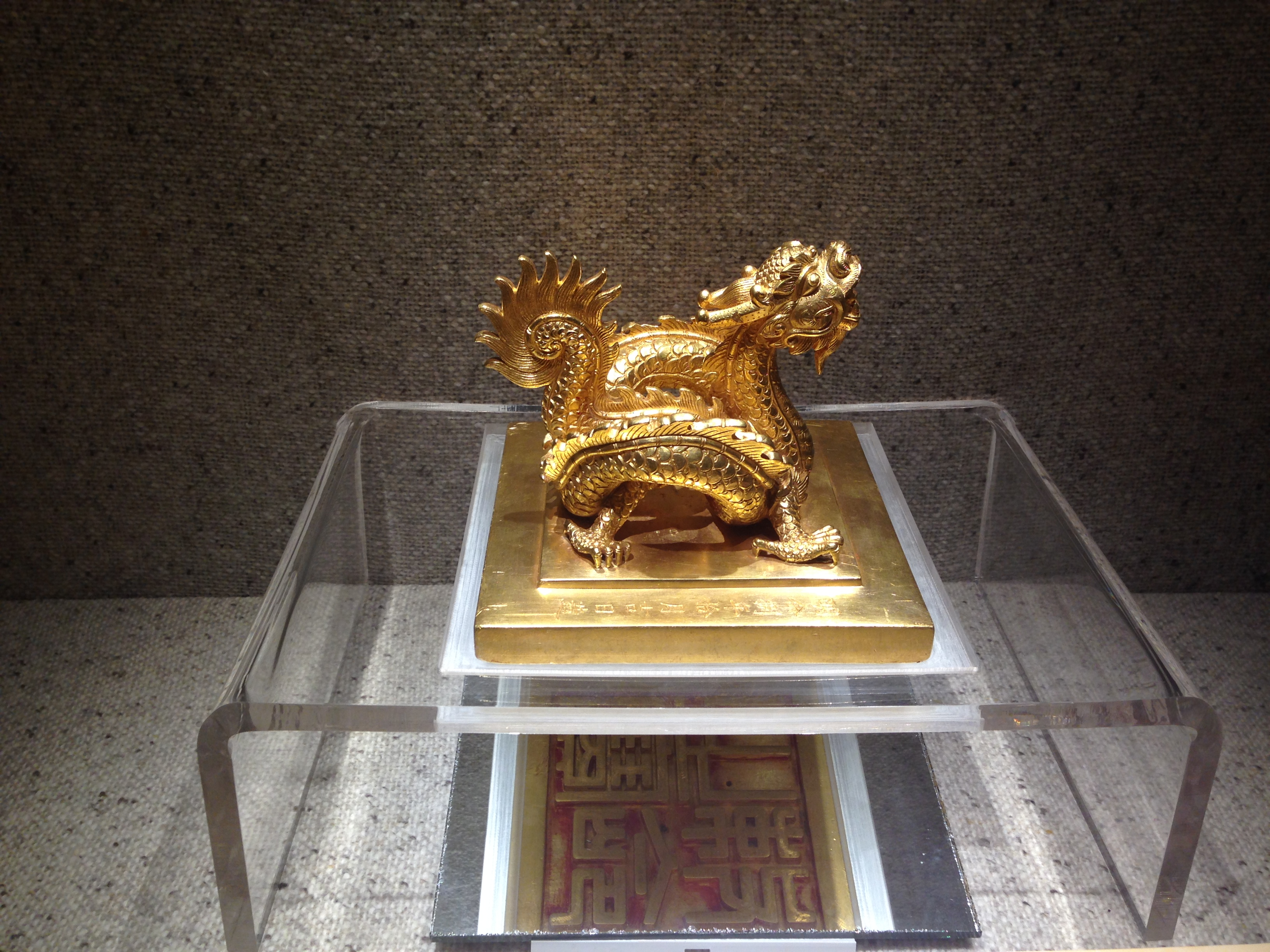
The golden Sắc mệnh chi bảo (敕命之寶) seal of the Nguyễn dynasty, on display at the National Museum of Vietnamese History, Hanoi.

During the reign of Emperor Thiệu Trị, 2 large jade stones were found in the year Thiệu Trị 4 (1844), these two large jade stones were presented to the imperial court by the people and the Emperor commissioned two jade seals to be created from these stones, namely the Thần hàn chi tỷ (宸翰之璽) and the Đại Nam Hoàng Đế chi tỷ (大南皇帝之璽).

Emperor Thiệu Trị commissioned a new imperial seal to replace the Đại Việt quốc Nguyễn Chúa vĩnh trấn chi bảo seal as the imperial seal in the year 1846, this seal had the inscription Đại Nam thụ thiên vĩnh mệnh truyền quốc tỷ (大南受天永命傳國璽, "The Great South has the eternal Mandate of Heaven, jade seal for the transmission of the legacy of the Empire"). The modern Vietnamese reading of the inscription is Ngọc Tỷ truyền quốc của nước Đại Nam, nhận mệnh lâu dài từ trời. The creation of the heirloom seal started in 1846 and was made within one year's time.

According to the historical records during the year of the Horse (năm Bính Ngọ), or the 6th year of Thiệu Trị's reign (1846), while some people were searching for gold and precious stones in Ngọc mountain, Hòa Điền District, Quảng Nam Province, they dug up a very large piece of jade that extremely brilliant and shiny. After their discovery they had offered to the Emperor. Upon receiving the large and rare jade the Thiệu Trị Emperor saw it as an auspicious omen and ordered a new seal to be carved from it. This became the Đại Nam thụ thiên vĩnh mệnh truyền quốc tỷ seal. After a year's worth of effort and talent, the engraver had finished making the seal and offered it to Thiệu Trị.

Upon receiving the heirloom seal Thiệu Trị immediately held a large Đại tự ceremony to confer that he had the Mandate of Heaven and prayed to have a long and prosperous reign. After the ceremony was completed the new heirloom seal was ordered to be stored in the Trung Hòa Palace in the Palace of Heavenly Purity (Cung Càn Thành) complex alongside the Đại Việt quốc Nguyễn Chúa vĩnh trấn chi bảo heirloom seal of the Nguyễn lords.

It had a handle in shape of a rolling dragon, it is 14.5 cm high, 13x12.7 wide, and 4.25 cm thick. It has the words meaning "Day 15, month 3 year Thiệu Trị 7" (紹治七年三月十五日, Thiệu Trị thất niên tam nguyệt thập ngũ nhật) carved into it. On the left side of the heirloom seal it is engraved with the Chinese characters "Đắc thượng cát lễ thành phụng chỉ cung tuyên" (得尚吉禮成奉旨恭鐫, Modern Vietnamese: Được ngày lành lễ Đại tự đã làm xong phụng chỉ khắc). On the head of the dragon on the top of the seal, it has the words carved "To serve in Nam Giao (南郊) ceremony" (南郊大禮邸告, Nam Giao đại lễ để cáo; Modern Vietnamese: Để tế cáo Đại lễ Đàn Nam Giao). This heirloom seal is said to be the biggest and most valuable among the ones produced by the imperial family of the Nguyễn dynasty. The Đại Nam thụ thiên vĩnh mệnh truyền quốc tỷ was used for diplomatic decrees and it was protected by the dynasty as an extremely valuable treasure.

During the reign of the Tự Đức Emperor the Nguyễn dynasty lost the Cochinchina campaign against the joint Franco-Hispanic forces and were forced to pay indemnities. Because the national treasury did not have enough gold bullion to pay, Emperor Tự Đức had to recover some gold and silver treasures that were displayed in the palaces to pay the French and Spanish. In the year 1869, the Tự Đức Emperor had ordered the princes (hoàng thân and hoàng tử) princesses (công chúa) to return the seals and needles that the imperial court had previously given them. After that, the Tự Đức Emperor had "renovated" (reissued) their items in the form of bronze seals and needles. From this point only the Emperor and his direct offspring used golden seals, some members of the imperial family were allowed to use silver seals, while mandarins of all ranks from the highest to the District-level mandarins used bronze seals. At the commune-level, mandarins used wooden seals.

Under the Tự Đức Emperor a round ivory seal with the 12 character inscription Hoan phụng ngũ đại đồng đường nhất thống Thiệu Trị chi bảo (歡奉五大同堂一統紹治之寶) written in 4 lines was created. The seal knob of this ivory seal is shaped like a dragon holding a wish-granting pearl. This seal was used on documents that record the joys and pleasures of the Emperor and the imperial family.

Sometime after the abdication of the Hàm Nghi Emperor an octagonal version of the golden Ngự tiền chi bảo (御前之寶) seal was created, this seal was usually stamped with the two Chinese characters "khâm thử" to indicate that a grammatical or other kind of error was present in the text. Before the creation of this octagonal seal the Ngự tiền chi bảo was always oval in shape.

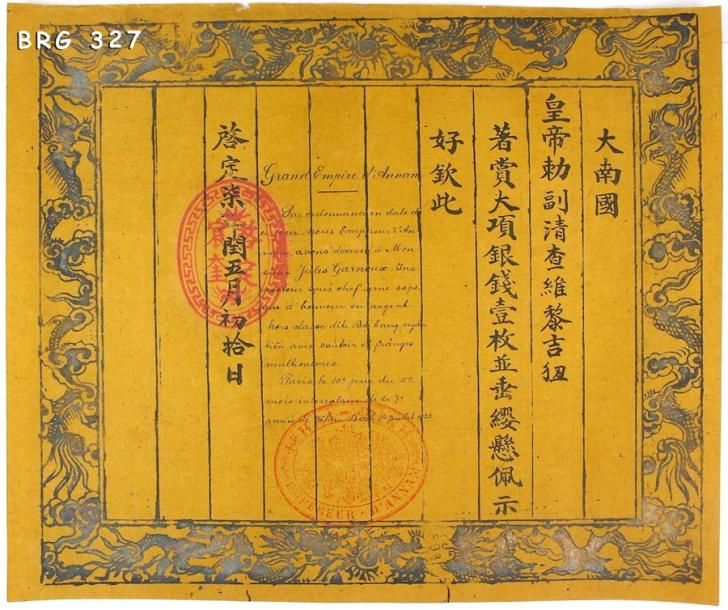
A Sapèque d'Honneur ("Cash coin of Honour") certificate issued to Jules Garnoux, it displays two different seals used by the Khải Định Emperor using Traditional Chinese characters and one using Latin script rather than the traditionally used ancient seal script, also notice that different seals were used for the French and Vietnamese (Classical Chinese) texts of the document. Dated Khải Định 7 (1922).

In 1886, under the reign of the Đồng Khánh Emperor, the Imperial Order of the Dragon of Annam was established, which featured a blue enamel with the design of a seal reading Đồng Khánh Hoàng Đế (同慶皇帝) in seal script.

Following the unexpected death of the Đồng Khánh Emperor a successor was chosen by the French and the court-mandarins in the form of Nguyễn Phúc Bửu Lân, Prince Quang Thái, who became the Thành Thái Emperor. The Directorate of Imperial Observatory declared 1 February as a most auspicious day for the enthronement. On 31 January 1889, according to rites, the young prince had made his lais to his ancestors in the Palace of Heavenly Purity and he then received the regalia of the Nguyễn dynasty. However, Thành Thái should also have received the jade heirloom seal known as the Ngọc-Bi on this day, but this seal was removed from the palace by Hàm Nghi during his flight from the capital and was subsequently lost in the mountains of the Quảng Bình Province.

During the reign of the Duy Tân Emperor a secret wooden seal with the inscription Tải Toả Võ Công (載纘武功, "Continue military works") was created for documents related to the Vietnamese independence movement against French occupation. Léon Sogny, director of security in Huế, wrote about it in a letter in which he claimed that the seal was discovered by the Khải Định Emperor. Furthermore, Sogny noted that some of the seal script characters resemble those of a seal produced under Nguyễn Ánh (the future Gia Long Emperor) when he was fighting against the Tây Sơn Rebellion in an effort "to reconquer the Kingdom".

Until the reign of the Khải Định Emperor most jade, silver, golden seals as well as the kim sách and ngân sách were kept at the Palace of Heavenly Purity, these were all strictly confidential. Without the orders of the Emperor nobody was allowed to open or even touch the seals. Every year, just before Tết Nguyên Đán, the Emperor would order the mandarins to perform the Phất thức ceremony and open all the caskets and then inventorise the treasures inside of the Palace of Heavenly Purity. After opening the casket the Mandarins would wash each seal with fragrant water and then use a cashew cloth to dry it and return it to their original place.

During the Khải Định period imperial seals with inscriptions written in Traditional Chinese characters instead of seal script began to be carved.

The last imperial seal produced by the Nguyễn dynasty was the golden Hoàng thái tử bảo (皇太子寶, "Seal of the imperial crown prince.") seal, which was created in the year 1939 during the reign of the Bảo Đại Emperor. It had a weight of 63 taels (lạng).

Around 1942 archivist and autodidact Paul Boudet, who was director of the archives and libraries of French Indochina, was granted access to all palaces and libraries of the Nguyễn dynasty in the Forbidden City by the Bảo Đại Emperor. Bảo Đại allowed him to study and record all the treasures stored in the Palace of Heavenly Purity. Precious items were moved out of cabinets and boxes for him to read, take notes about, and take pictures of. According to Paul Boudet there were 46 gold and jade seals belonging to the Emperors and Empresses stored in the Palace of Heavenly Purity, as well as 26 Kim Sách. Paul Boudet published his research and findings in Les Archives des Empereurs d’Annam et l’histoire annamite (Hanoi, IDEO, 1942). According to a 2015 British Broadcasting Corporation Paris (BBC Paris) news article by Phạm Cao Phong, the 46 imperial seals Paul Boudet documented were made of gold, silver, gilded copper, and gilded silver and of these imperial seals 44 are now in the possession of the National Museum of Vietnamese History in Hanoi.

=== Bronze seals of government employees ===
Bronze seals, known as chương, tín chương (until 1832), ấn, and quan phòng, among others, were seals made for government employees and government offices of all levels. Bronze seals were often created as a pair together with an additional small reserve seal called a dấu kiềm. The inscriptions of the dấu kiềm were identical to that of the main bronze seal. The seals of middle-level and low-level mandarins were called ký, kiềm ký and được and were mainly made of bronze or wood.

All bronze seals in the Nguyễn dynasty were cast by the Vũ Khố (arsenal).

Strict regulations existed for bronze government office seals that forbade their usage outside of official documents, unlike corporate and private seals which could be used without limitation. If someone used a government seal in a private setting it was considered to be a criminal offense. An exception was made for the day of the traditional opening ceremony after new year (Tết Nguyên Đán) where seals were stamped on an empty peace of paper, however, it was stipulated that after stamping these papers with a seal that they had to be burned. Another regulation stipulated that if the court would confiscate a seal or if a lost seal was found that it was to immediately be destroyed.

When signing documents the head of the department had to personally impress the office seal on the document and no subordinate was allowed to use the seal.

=== Quan phòng ===
The Quan phòng (關防) type seal appeared from the Gia Long period until the Minh Mạng period. The Quan phòng was usually stamped on the name of the signing party or at times at the "month" (月, nguyệt) part of the date present on a document. This type was primarily used for the internal affairs of various government offices, for example for use by the Court of Justice exclusively for internal affairs.

Quan phòng-type seals typically had the two Chinese characters Quan phòng inscribed into the end of their inscriptions. Gia Long awarded Quan phòng seals with to a number of a high rank officials during his reign. It was not until the year of Minh Mạng 13 (1832) with the change of the bureaucracy structure, the establishment of the province and the appointment of new officials such as the Tổng đốc, Tuần phủ, Lãnh binh, Etc. that the Chương-style seals completely replaced the Quan phòng for many levels of the Nguyễn bureaucracy.

It was stipulated in the year Minh Mạng 13 (1832) that Quan phòng-style bronze seals would be created for the government offices of Imperial Arsenal (Nhà kho Vũ khố), Imperial Household Department (phủ Nội Vụ), Merchant ship management department (quản lý tàu buôn), tào chính, đê chính, Capital City Department (đề đốc kinh thành), Provincial military leaders (lãnh binh các tỉnh), kinh tượng, Palace Guards (xứ thị vệ), the Imperial Academy (Quốc tử giám), học chính, the Principality of Muang Phuan (Bang biện phủ Trấn Ninh), Thái y viện, the Cabinet of the Nguyễn dynasty (sung biện nội các sự vụ), Water Affairs Office Management (thủy sư thống chế), phòng văn thư, tả hữu tham tri, the 6 Ministries, phó thần sách, 5 Armies, quản lý thương quyền, the main representative offices of the Six Ministries in Saigon and Hanoi (tào chính các tào của 6 bộ ở Gia Định và Bắc thành), học chính các dinh trấn, chánh quản cơ tứ dực thủy quân, Thuận Thành District Management (quản lý Thuận Thành), hùng cự ngũ kích, thị tượng các vệ, dũng thịnh hùng tượng, tri tâm tượng cơ, Regular Army Guards (an định kiện binh trung tượng), the Provincial Military Commander of Huế (đề đốc kinh thành), các nơi quan tân (bến sông, bến đò được đánh thuế hàng hóa), tỉnh hạt, the imperial warehouse (nhà kho), Provincial Military Lead (phó lãnh binh), an phủ sứ, the Provincial Military Commander (đề đốc), the Imperial Guard (thị vệ xứ), Etc. These Quan phòng-style bronze seals were cast in different sizes and weights and were accompanied a smaller ivory or bronze seal with the same inscription. These seals were mainly impressed on documents using black ink.

The government of the Nguyễn dynasty granted more Quan phòng-style bronze seals to its bureaucracy on more levels than the contemporary Qing dynasty.

=== Đồ ký ===
According to historical records, the Đồ ký (圖記) type of seals had to be placed on filings, private papers, books, salary, and reports. During the Nguyễn dynasty period the Đồ ký type of seal was often found on documents used by ethnic minorities, often on documents using their own scripts.

The Đồ ký was usually stamped on the "month" (月, nguyệt) part of the date present on a document.

It was stipulated in the year Minh Mạng 13 (1832) that the Đồ ký-type seal was granted to mandarins in charge of a Phủ-level division, District-level mandarins, teachers, instructors, guard chiefs, heads of a Ty, and naval commanders.

Only the Đồ ký-type seals of guards and army units were allowed to be stamped using red ink, while the rest used black ink.

=== Kiềm ký ===
The Kiềm ký (鈐記) seal type was used by low-level mandarins and military commanders in charge of estuaries, border gates, small boat fleets, passes, Etc. It was usually stamped on the "month" (月, nguyệt) part of the date present on a document. Another feature of some Kiềm ký type of seals is that many of these seals had inscriptions written in Traditional Chinese characters as opposed to seal script.

It was stipulated in the year Minh Mạng 13 (1832) that the Kiềm ký-type seal was granted to the government offices of các tấn, thủ, vịnh, sở, the guards of the Meridian Gate (thủ hộ Ngọ Môn), the guards of the Great Palace (thủ hộ cửa Đại cung), the departments of the Six Provinces of Southern Vietnam (sở Tuần ty 6 (lục) tỉnh Nam Kỳ), and Trấn Tây Thành (thành Trấn Tây, Cambodia under Nguyễn dynasty rule).

Only the Kiềm ký-type seals of guards and army units were allowed to be stamped using red ink, while the rest used black ink.

=== Trưởng ký ===
The Trưởng ký (長記) type of seals was commonly used by the chiefs of cantons and communes. This is considered to be the mark of lowest-level of local mandarins. The Trưởng ký was usually placed next to or below the section with the mandarin's full name at the end of the text to confirm the authenticity and responsibility of the participating mandarin. By the end of the Nguyễn dynasty period Trưởng ký were typically rectangular with Traditional Chinese characters in the middle and Latin script (romanisations) on the outer area.

=== Tín ký ===
The Tín ký (信記) refers to general seals that were created by or for mandarins of any rank. From the Gia Long period all mandarins were allowed to make their own seals as they wished. The Tín ký were free to be used as individual seals in the fields of religion, personal beliefs and convictions, culture, and commerce in the Nguyễn dynasty. It was used to the stamp the position of the name of the signing party akin to how a signature works.

By the year of Minh Mạng 7 (1826), there began to be specific rules made for the usage and creation of Tín ký seals. According to the Khâm định Đại Nam hội điển sự lệ a mandarin was allowed to make a custom square seal made of ivory or wood. This seal was engraved with the name of the mandarin. New standard sizes were also introduced during this period. But overall these new rules weren't intended to change how the Tín ký were used, though it did specify that they had to be stamped below the date of each document using the same ink as the text on the document.

In addition, the Tín ký was commonly affixed below or next to the text used to indicate the title of the person or their name. Usually Tín ký were used by local officials for regional documents and served to identify the mandarin signing the document to other regional (low-level) mandarins.

=== Military seals ===
During the reign of Gia Long 5 bronze seals were created for the five heads of the five different armies of the Nguyễn dynasty (ngũ quân), namely the Trung quân chi ấn (中軍之印), Tiền quân chi ấn (前軍之印), Tả quân chi ấn (左軍之印), Hữu quân chi ấn (右軍之印), and the Hậu quân chi ấn (后軍之印). The seal knob of these seals feature a Vietnamese guardian lion.

=== Seal knobs ===
Below are some of the seal knob shapes that are required for the following government positions or institutions of the Nguyễn dynasty:

- Purple text = Indicates that the seal is a Quan phòng (關防).
- Green text = Indicates that the seal is a Đồ ký (圖記).

Seal knob (Núm của ấn triện)	Government offices	Image
Kỳ lân (Núm có hình kỳ lân)	Military supervision office (Thần sách giám quân), Central Army (Trung quân), Front Army (Tiền Quân), Left Army (Tả quân), (Note: Used by General Lê Văn Duyệt.) Right Army (Hữu quân), and Rear Army (Hậu quân).	
Tiger (Núm có hình con hổ)	Protectorate of Cambodia (Bảo hộ Cao Miên), Deputy-General of the 5 Armies (Phó tướng ngũ quân), Interprovincial-level Confucian exam (Trường thi Hương), The Palace (Các dinh), Townships (Trấn), Circuits (Đạo), Prefectures (Phủ), District-level governments (Huyện), and Châu.	
Chinese guardian lion (Núm có hình sư tử)	Head of the Left and Right town divisions (Tả hữu thống chế các dinh Thị Trung), Heads of Towns (Thị Nội), Thần Cơ, Tiền Phong, Long Vũ, Hổ Oai, Hùng Nhuệ, Huyền Vũ, Head of the water defense (Thống Chế Thủy Sư), Tả Hữu Dực Quân Vũ Lâm, Provincial entrance exam school (Trường thi tuyển sinh các tỉnh), Merchant ship management (Quản lý tàu buôn), Tào Chính, Đê Chính, Các tào Binh, Các tào Hình, Các tào Công, Ministry of Revenue office in Gia Định (Hộ ở Gia Định), Ministry of Revenue office in Bắc Thành (Hộ ở Bắc Thành), and the Guozijian (Quốc Tử Giám).	
Straight knob (Núm thẳng)	Censorate (Đô Sát viện), Khoa Đạo, Court of Judicial Review (Đại Lý tự), Court of Imperial Sacrifices (Thái Thường tự), Court of Imperial Entertainments (Quang Lộc tự), Court of the Imperial Stud (Thái Bộc tự), Hanlin Academy (Hàn Lâm viện), Directorate of Imperial Observatory (Khâm Thiên giám), Administration Commissioner (Bố chính), Provincial Surveillance Commissioner (Án sát các tỉnh), Prefecture-level Surveillance Commissioner (Án sát các phủ), District-level Surveillance Commissioner (Án sát các huyện), Châu-level Surveillance Commissioner (Án sát các châu), Storehouse of the Imperial Arsenal (Nhà kho thuộc Vũ Khố, Imperial Household Department (Phủ Nội vụ), Provincial Military Commander of the Capital (Đề Đốc kinh thành), Provincial Military Lead (Lãnh binh các tỉnh), Capital Military Lead (Lãnh binh kinh tượng), Imperial Guards (Xứ thị vệ), Provincial Education Administration (Học chính các tỉnh), Main administration of the Imperial Navy (Chính quản cơ tứ dực thủy quân), and the Management of Thuận Thành (Quản lý Thuận Thành).	
Vegetables and algae (Núm khắc rau tảo)	Thái Y viện and the Documentary department (Phòng văn thư).	
Long round-shaped knob (Núm tròn dài)	Protectorate of Muang Phuan (Bang biện phủ Trấn Ninh).	
Hemisphere-shaped knob (Núm vòng bán cầu)	Cabinet of the Nguyễn dynasty (Sung biện Nội các sự vụ), all Guards (Các vệ), Military units consisting of 10 or 200–500 soldiers (Cơ), all District territorial units (Các thổ huyện), and all military camps and encampments (Các đồn trại).	

== After 1945 ==
The seal of Bảo Đại as the Chief of State of Vietnam. It has the inscription "Quốc-gia Việt-Nam - Đức Bảo Đại - Quốc-trưởng" written in Latin script and "保大國長" (top-to-bottom, right-to-left) in seal script. (1949–1954)

=== Transfer of the Nguyễn dynasty seals to the Democratic Republic of Vietnam and its symbolism ===
Following his abdication in 1945, Emperor Bảo Đại handed over 800 kilograms of antiques, including seals, from the Forbidden City and other royal palaces to the revolutionary government of the Democratic Republic of Vietnam following its declaration of independence. As the capital city moved from Huế to Hanoi these antiques were stored at the Vietnam National Museum of History. At the time, only light and small items were selected to move to Hanoi, as heavy items, such as the throne, the Emperor's palanquin, stone-made screen of the Minh Mạng Emperor, etc. were left in the city of Huế.

As a part of his official abdication, Emperor Bảo Đại personally gave his regalia to representatives of the government of the Democratic Republic of Vietnam in ceremony. In this ceremony he handed over the Hoàng Đế chi bảo (皇帝之寶) seal and the jade-encrusted silver sword (An dân bảo kiếm, known as the "Sword of the State") to the Communist government. The passing of the ceremonial seal and sword had been seen as symbolically "passing the Mandate of Heaven over to the government of the Democratic Republic of Vietnam". Following the French counteroffensive during the First Indochina War the government of Democratic Republic of Vietnam publicly buried the seal and the Sword of the State.

Following the transfer of the treasures from the government of the Nguyễn dynasty to the Democratic Republic of Vietnam, an official named Nguyễn Lân commented to Chairman Hồ Chí Minh "In the opinion of many people, it is necessary to melt all the gold and silver taken over from the Nguyễn dynasty to increase the budget to serve the resistance." (Theo ý kiến của nhiều người, cần nấu chảy toàn bộ số vàng bạc tiếp quản từ triều Nguyễn để tăng ngân lượng phục vụ kháng chiến). In response Hồ Chí Minh asked: "If one day we unify the entire country, what evidence will exist to confirm that we have a tradition of several thousand years of civilisation?" (Nếu một ngày nào đó thống nhất đất nước, chúng ta lấy bằng chứng gì để khẳng định chúng ta có truyền thống mấy ngàn năm văn hiến?). This decision ensured the preservation of Nguyễn dynasty treasures into the present day.

According to a paper written by Brian Michael Jenkins of the RAND Corporation in March 1972 entitled "Why the North Vietnamese will keep fighting" that distributed by the National Technical Information Service, an agency of the United States Department of Commerce, because of the transfer of the ceremonial seal and sword in 1945 the North Vietnamese believed that they were in possession of the Mandate of Heaven while the supposedly Republic of Vietnam did not it. So Jenkins argued that the North Vietnamese and the Việt Cộng believed that they would be victorious in the Vietnam War because it was "Heaven's will" as only the government with the Mandate of Heaven was the legitimate ruler of the Vietnamese people.

Brian Michael Jenkins wrote that the senior leadership of North Vietnam (the Democratic Republic of Vietnam) and the Workers' Party of Vietnam believed this, as many were the children of Nguyễn dynasty mandarins and were raised in a Confucian environment, rather than from the Proletariat. This is why, in his opinion, the Communists often acted more as Traditionalists than did the South Vietnamese.

"Ho Chi Minh himself was the son of a Confucian scholar who served Vietnam's emperor as a minor mandarin. So are Pham Van Dong, North Vietnam's prime minister, General Vo Nguyen Giap, its defense minister, and Xuan Thuy, Hanoi's chief negotiator in Paris, the sons of Confucian scholars. Nguyen Thi Binh, the chief delegate of the Provisional Revolutionary Government, is the granddaughter of a famous Vietnamese poet and scholar who led demonstrations against the French shortly after World War I."

— Why the North Vietnamese will keep fighting by Brian Michael Jenkins (March 1972).

Later Brian Michael Jenkins noted that regarding the Mandate of Heaven being transferred through the passing of the Hoàng Đế chi bảo seal and the Sword of the State presented a strong personal motivation for the Communist leadership to pursue victory over the Republic of Vietnam (South Vietnam) during the Vietnam War. In a later passage regarding the psychology of the Communist Vietnamese leadership Jenkins wrote:

"Possession of the "Mandate of Heaven" guarantees eventual victory, just as the Communist interpretation of history guarantees the inevitable victory of the Communists. Since Vietnamese Communists believe they have the "Mandate of Heaven," they must believe they will win. To accept defeat would be to accept that the "Mandate of Heaven" does not work; it would compromise the philosophy upon which Hanoi's leaders have based their entire lives."

— Why the North Vietnamese will keep fighting by Brian Michael Jenkins (March 1972).

This was cited as an important psychological reason why the Communists were so determined to keep on fighting and didn't give up during the Vietnam War when fighting the South Vietnamese and their allies (including the United States).

=== Seal of the Chief of State of Vietnam ===
Following the establishment of the State of Vietnam, former Nguyễn dynasty Emperor Bảo Đại created a seal (Ấn triện) for his role as the new Chief of State of Vietnam. This seal was square in shape and had the inscription "Quốc-gia Việt-Nam - Đức Bảo Đại - Quốc-trưởng" written in Latin script and "保大國長" (top-to-bottom, right-to-left) in seal script.

=== Fate of the Hoàng Đế chi bảo seal ===
The imprint of the Hoàng Đế chi bảo (皇帝之寶) seal.

After carefully looking for the regalia the French later dug up the sword, which had been broken into three pieces, and then handed these pieces over to the Empress Dowager Từ Cung (the mother of Emperor Bảo Đại) who likely handed it over to the concubine Mộng Điệp. The Hoàng Đế chi bảo seal remained buried and when Hanoi was given back to the North Vietnamese they dug the seal up and gave it to the National Museum of Vietnamese History. Later the Hoàng Đế chi bảo was stolen from the museum and it eventually ended up in the hands of concubine Mộng Điệp who intended to hand it, and the sword, back to Emperor Bảo Đại after he would return from France to Dalat. However, Bảo Đại ordered her to bring the regalia to France, where she gave it to Empress Nam Phương in 1953. In 1982 the Crown Prince Bảo Long handed the imperial seal back to his father, Bảo Đại. Until 2022, there has been no word as to the whereabouts of the Hoàng Đế chi bảo seal.

In 2022, French auction house Millon announced it would put the seal up for auction after Monique Baudot's death, but the auction was deferred as the Vietnamese government expressed its intention to repatriate the seal through negotiations to buy it back. On November 15, the Ministry of Culture, Sport and Tourism of Vietnam announced that the Vietnamese government successfully negotiated the return of Hoàng Đế chi bảo from Millon.

On February 13, 2023, a Vietnamese antique collector had successfully acquired the seal. After the new owner of the seal was announced, an official from Ministry of Culture, Sport and Tourism told that the Ministry would complete all procedures to repatriate the Hoàng Đế chi bảo back to Vietnam. On November 16, 2023, Vietnamese ambassador to France announced that Hoàng đế chi bảo was transferred to the Vietnamese government.

=== Fate of the Đại Nam thụ thiên vĩnh mệnh truyền quốc tỷ seal ===
Following the end of the Nguyễn dynasty in 1945, regional director of Huế, Phạm Khắc Hòe, decided to move it among other treasures from city to Hanoi to present it to Ministry of Labour on 27 and 28 August 1945.

In response to the outbreak of the First Indochina War in December 1946 the Ministry of Labour decided to transfer its Nguyễn dynasty collections to be stored at the 5th Interzone (Liên khu 5) for safekeeping. After Việt Minh victory at the Battle of Điện Biên Phủ in 1954, the collection (including is seal) was brought to the Ministry of Finance for management. On December 17, 1959, the Ministry of Finance decided to hand over its Nguyễn dynasty collections (including the seal) to the Vietnam History Museum (now the National Museum of Vietnamese History) for storage.

In 1962 to ensure the security of the collection during the Vietnam War, the Vietnam History Museum sent this collection to the State Bank of Vietnam for safekeeping. It wasn't until the 1000th anniversary of Hanoi (Lễ kỷ niệm 1000 năm Thăng Long - Hà Nội) that the seal was put on public display.

In 2017 the Đại Nam thụ thiên vĩnh mệnh truyền quốc tỷ seal was among 24 things declared a National Treasure that year and was described by the National Museum of Vietnamese History as its most valuable possession within its Nguyễn dynasty collection.

=== Nguyễn dynasty period cultural heritage artifacts in private and foreign hands ===
As a result of both the French conquest of the Nguyễn dynasty in 1883 and the August Revolution overthrowing the Nguyễn dynasty in 1945 many treasures of the Nguyễn Empire have fallen in the hands of both Vietnamese museums scattered throughout the country and private collectors all over the world. In recent years, Nguyễn dynasty treasures have been publicly traded at antique auctions in places like London, Paris, New York, Etc., or sold on commercial websites such as eBay or Spin. A large amount of golden treasures of both the Nguyễn dynasty and the earlier Nguyễn lords, including seals, were given by the Nguyễn to the French and Spanish governments to pay for the war reparations imposed on Vietnam following the Franco-Hispanic Cochinchina campaign, many of these treasures are now (as of 2009) kept in the Hotel de la Monnaie, Paris. Another example of a sacking of Huế happened on 5 July 1885 when the rebellious Hàm Nghi Emperor fled the city and the Forbidden City was sacked by the French who stole 228 diamonds, 266 jewels encrusted with diamonds, pearls, pearls, and 271 gold items from a single palace alone, though a number of these treasures were returned during the Duy Tân period.

=== Nguyễn dynasty seals in Vietnamese museums ===
In the year 1962, to ensure the safety of the antiques of the Nguyễn dynasty, the National Museum of Vietnamese History had moved them to the warehouse of the State Bank of Vietnam. This collection included many unique items of the Nguyễn Emperors as well as the rest of the imperial family, such as the hats of the Emperors, golden books, gold and jade seals, the Emperor's swords, furthermore, the collection included various types of daily-use items of the Emperors, the worship items of the Nguyễn Dynasty, and many documents containing cultural value of the Nguyễn dynasty. The treasures were stored in corrugated iron boxes and then packed in wooden crates with a list of corresponding artifacts. The keys to the crates were kept by the museum. For nearly half a century, the collection was completely closed off to the public, and very few people knew of its existence.

In the year 2007, the State Bank of Vietnam handed over the entire collection of precious artifacts from its warehouses back to the National Museum of Vietnamese History, this collection included 85 imperial seals.

In the year 2010 to celebrate 1000 years of Thăng Long - Hanoi the National Museum of Vietnamese History published a book with 85 imperial seals made of gold, silver, and jade entitled Kim ngọc bảo tỷ của Hoàng đế và vương hậu triều Nguyễn Việt Nam, "Seals of the emperors and empresses of the Nguyễn dynasty") and were then put on display at the museum for public viewing. Many articles, books, and publications introducing the Collection have been published such as Cổ ngọc Việt Nam (Ancient Vietnamese jade) and Bảo vật Hoàng cung triều Nguyễn (Imperial treasures of the Nguyễn Dynasty).

In 2015, a ministry-level scientific research project started entitled Giải mã minh văn trên các bảo vật triều Nguyễn lưu trữ tại Bảo tàng Lịch sử Quốc gia (Decoding the characters on the Nguyễn dynasty treasures stored at the National Museum of Vietnamese History) which also investigated and researched all the seals stored at the National Museum of Vietnamese History.

In 2015 the Sắc mệnh chi bảo (Sắc mệnh chi bửu) golden seal created under Minh Mạng was designated as a National Treasure, or Bảo vật Quốc gia. This was later followed with the Đại Việt quốc Nguyễn Chúa vĩnh trấn chi bảo seal also being declared a National Treasure in 2016, which was then put on display for the public in 2017.

As of 2016 no imperial seals were left in the former Nguyễn dynasty capital city of Huế. Although at times some imperial Nguyễn dynasty seals return to Huế for exhibitions, such as the "Dragons and Phượng hoàng on treasures of the Nguyễn Dynasty" (Rồng - phượng trên bảo vật triều Nguyễn) exhibition of 2018 which hosted over 80 different treasures and artifacts from the Nguyễn imperial court including the Hoan phụng ngũ đại đồng đường nhất thống Thiệu Trị chi bảo (歡奉五大同堂一統紹治之寶), Tự Đức thần hàn (嗣德宸翰), and Chính hậu chi bảo seals.

== Types of imperial seals ==
- Gold and jade seals of the Nguyễn dynasty
- Vietnamese alphabet: Bảo tỷ triều Nguyễn / Bửu tỷ triều Nguyễn; Bảo tỷ nhà Nguyễn / Bửu tỷ nhà Nguyễn
- Hán-Nôm: 寶璽朝阮 寶璽茹阮

While seals in the Nguyễn dynasty made from bronze, silver, ceramics, ivory, Etc. were made for mandarins and other people throughout the Empire without much restrictions, the materials of jade and gold were exclusive to the Emperors and the imperial family.

=== Jade seals ===
Jade seals, or ngọc tỷ (玉璽), were a kind of seal made of different kinds of jade like emerald, white jade, or blue jade. Most jade seals produced under the reign of the Nguyễn dynasty were carved under the reigns of Emperors Minh Mạng and Tự Đức. Due to the fact that jade at the time was considered to be a rare material, there were less jade seals produced than metal ones (like gold seals). The oldest jade seals during the Nguyễn dynasty were likely produced during the Nguyễn lords period and had the inscriptions Phong cương vạn cổ and Vạn Thọ vô cương (Endless life).

Later studies on jade seals in the records of the Nguyễn dynasty period by the National Museum of Vietnamese History in Hanoi didn't find any contemporary picture of jade seals. So, the studies had to exclusively rely on the historiographical books called Cơ mật viện túc trình (Records of the King's Consultation Institute of the Nguyễn dynasty) and Khâm định Đại Nam hội điển sự lệ (History of the cabinet of the Nguyễn dynasty).

During the year Mậu Tý of the reign of Minh Mạng, the man Nguyễn Đăng Khoa from the Quảng Trị Province presented the Emperor with a gift in the form of a jade seal with the inscription "Vạn thọ vô cương" (萬壽無疆).

In 1835 Minh Mạng ordered the creation of a jade seal with the inscription Hoàng Đế chi tỷ (皇帝之璽). It has the carved words "Minh Mạng thập lục niên Ất Mùi tuyên" (Made in Ất Mùi (year of goat), the 16th Minh Mạng year, 1835), and a seal knob featuring two dragons.

A jade seal with the inscription Khâm văn chi tỷ was exclusively used on cultural documents.

The Hoàng Đế chi tỷ seal was exclusively used on the occasion of a general amnesty or the change of reign era (date).

=== Golden seals ===
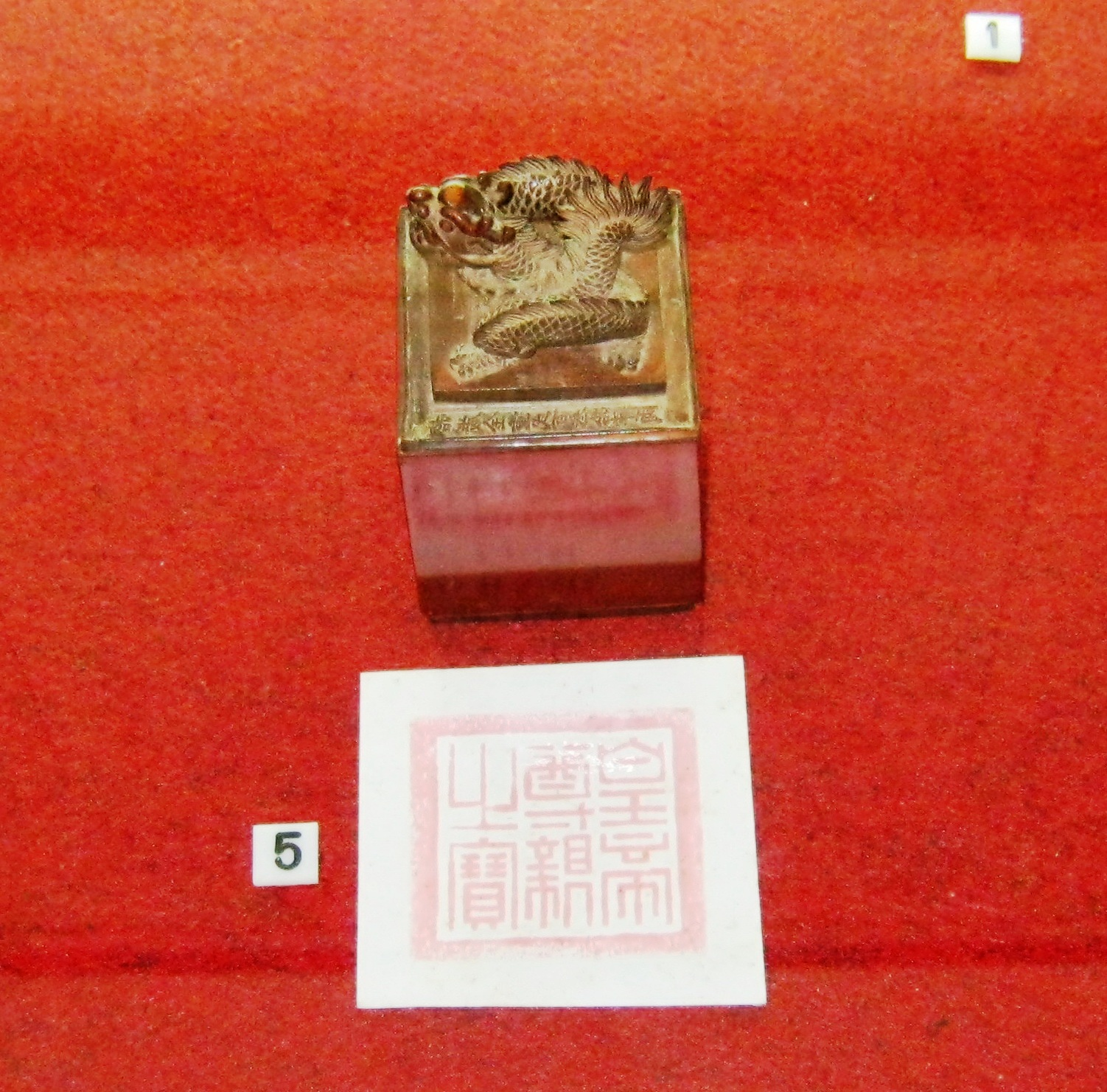
The golden "Hoàng Đế tôn thân chi bảo" seal created in 1885, on display at the Museum of Vietnamese History, Hồ Chí Minh City.

Golden seals, known in Vietnamese as Kim bửu tỷ (金寶璽), Kim bảo tỷ (金寶璽), or Kim tỷ (金璽), are seals whose inscriptions usually end with "bảo / bửu" (寶).

On mồng 4 tháng 2 năm Minh Mạng thứ tư (15 February 1823) the Hoàng Đế chi bảo (皇帝之寶) was created by order of the Minh Mạng Emperor. According to Dr. Phan Thanh Hải, Director of the Huế Monuments Conservation Centre, the Hoàng Đế chi bảo contains a seal knob in the form of a five-clawed dragon with an erect tail standing in a steady posture. The seal contains the inscriptions "Minh Mạng tứ niên nhị nguyệt sơ tứ nhật cát thời chú tạo" indicating its date of creation and "Thập thành hoàng kim, trọng nhị bách thập lạng cửu tiền nhị phân" indicating that the seal is made of gold and weighs 280 taels (lạng) and 9 mace (tiền), and 2 candareens (phân), or slightly less than 10.5 kilograms making it the heaviest among the seals of the Nguyễn dynasty. The Hoàng Đế chi bảo was considered to be the "top seal" of the Emperor and was only stamped on the most documents on home and foreign affairs.

The Sắc mệnh chi bảo (敕命之寶) has the largest surface of any Nguyễn dynasty period seal at 14 cm x 14 cm, by comparison for the jade seals, the one with the largest surface is 10,5 cm x 10,5 cm. Despite having a larger surface, at 223 taels the Sắc mệnh chi bảo weighs less than the Hoàng Đế chi bảo. This seal is made of 8.3 kg pure gold. Both the Sắc mệnh chi bảo and the Phong Tặng chi bảo were used by the Nguyễn dynasty Emperors to stamp on conferment documents for mandarins in the realm. The Sắc mệnh chi bảo seal was transferred by the Nguyễn dynasty government to the Democratic Republic of Vietnam in 1945 and is now housed in the Vietnam National Museum of History under museum number "LSb.34447".

The golden Trị lịch minh thời chi bảo (治歷明時之寶) seal was used on annual calendars.

During the reign of the Thiệu Trị Emperor a seal with the inscription Thánh Tổ Nhân Hoàng Đế chi bảo was created in the year Thiệu Trị 1 (1841). The creation of this golden seal was ordered two months into his reign to be used in the Thế Miếu shrine to honour his late father. This golden seal has two inscriptions written on its top, one inscription on the left side reads Bát ngũ tuế hoàng kim, trọng nhất bách thập nhất lạng ngũ tiền tứ phân. (English: Gold eight and a half years old with a weight of 111 taels, 5 mace, and 4 candareens; Modern Vietnamese: Vàng 8 tuổi rưỡi, nặng 111 lạng 5 tiền 4 phân). On the right it has the inscription Thiệu Trị nguyên niên tam nguyệt cát nhật phụng chú tạo. (English: Cast on the most auspicious day of the 3rd month of the 1st year of the reign of Thiệu Trị, 1841; Modern Vietnamese: Phụng mệnh đúc vào ngày lành tháng 3 năm Thiệu Trị thứ 1, 1841). This seal features a seal knob in the form of a five-clawed dragon standing with its head upturned and its back arched, further it has a tail with 6 pointed bands.

During the reign of the Thiệu Trị Emperor a golden seal with the inscription Nhân Tuyên Từ Khánh Thái Hoàng Thái hậu chi bảo (仁宣慈慶太皇太后之寶) was created to honour his paternal grandmother Trần Thị Đang during the first year of his reign (1841). Its seal knob is shaped as a five-clawed dragon standing upright with its head upturned, its back arched, and its tail bent with 7 flame-shaped ends. On the left of the seal knob is the text Bát ngũ tuế hoàng kim, trọng cửu thập ngũ lượng thất tiền tứ phân (八五歲皇金重九十五両七錢四分; English: Eight year old gold with a weight of 95 taels, 7 mace, and 4 candareens; Modern Vietnamese: Vàng 8 tuổi rưỡi, nặng 95 lạng 7 tiền 4 phân). While on its right side is the inscription Thiệu Trị nguyên niên tam nguyệt cát nhật phụng chú tạo (紹治元年三月吉日奉鑄造; English: Created on the auspicious day of the third month of the first year of the reign of Thiệu Trị; Modern Vietnamese: Phụng mệnh đúc vào ngày lành tháng 3 năm Thiệu Trị 1, 1841).

Another golden seal for an Empress Dowager was created during the reign of the Thiệu Trị Emperor with the inscription Nhân Hoàng hậu chi bảo (仁皇后之寶). Its seal knob features a five-clawed dragon standing up right with its head held up high and a twisted 6-pointed flame-shaped tail. On the left of the seal knob is the text Bát ngũ tuế kim, trọng bát thập nhị lượng nhị tiền tam phân (八五歲金重八十二両二錢三分; English: Eight year old gold with a weight of 82 taels, 2 mace, and 3 candareens; Modern Vietnamese: Vàng 8 tuổi rưỡi, nặng 82 lạng 2 tiền 3 phân). While on the right it is inscribed with the text Thiệu Trị nguyên niên tứ nguyệt cát nhật phụng chú tạo (紹治元年四月吉日奉鑄造; English: Created on a good day during the 4th month of the first year of the reign of Thiệu Trị; Modern Vietnamese: Đúc vào ngày lành tháng 4 năm Thiệu Trị 1, 1841). This seal was created to honour Hồ Thị Hoa (or the Empress Dowager Tá Thiên).

During the reign of the Thiệu Trị Emperor a seal with the inscription Phúc Tuy công ấn seal was created, this seal featured a seal knob in the form of a four-clawed dragon. On the left of the seal knob is the text Trọng tứ thập ngũ lạng ngũ tiền (English: Weight of 45 taels and 5 mace; Modern Vietnamese: Nặng 45 lạng 5 tiền). While on right it featured the inscription Thiệu Trị tam niên tạo (English: Created in the 3rd year of the reign of Thiệu Trị, 1843; Modern Vietnamese: Đúc vào năm Thiệu Trị thứ 3, 1843). according to the Nguyễn Phúc tộc thế phả this seal was given to Prince Nguyễn Phúc Hồng Nhậm in the year 1843 when he was conferred as Phúc Tuy Công.

During the reign of the Thiệu Trị Emperor a golden seal with the inscription Đại Nam hiệp kỷ lịch chi bảo (大南協紀曆之寶), this seal has a five-clawed dragon-shaped seal knob that is similar in design to the ones found on the Minh Mạng period Khâm văn chi tỷ, Duệ vũ chi tỷ and Trị lịch minh thời chi bảo seals. On its handle it features two inscriptions, one the left is written Thập tuế hoàng kim, trọng nhất bách nhị thập ngũ lạng ngũ tiền tứ phân (English: Ten year old gold with a weight of 125 taels, 5 mace, and 4 candareens; Modern Vietnamese: Vàng 10 tuổi, nặng 125 lạng 5 tiền 4 phân). While on its left it is inscribed with the text Thiệu Trị thất niên thập nguyệt cát nhật tạo (English: Cast on the auspicious day of the 10th month of 7th year of the reign of Thiệu Trị; Modern Vietnamese: Đúc vào ngày lành tháng 10 năm Thiệu trị thứ 7, 1847). This seal superseded the Trị lịch minh thời chi bảo for usage on the official calendars of the Nguyễn dynasty.

=== Ivory seals ===
During the years 1846–1847, The Thiệu Trị Emperor ordered the creation of an ivory seal. This seal has a dragon-shaped seal knob, a round face (as opposed to most square seals), and a diameter of 10.8 centimeters. Its inscription is carved in the words meaning "As a record for the enjoyment of the Emperor and the imperial family".

Under Emperor Khải Định an ivory seal was created that was ellipse in shape and had the inscription Khải Định thần khuê (啟定宸奎) written in Traditional Chinese characters as opposed to seal script.

=== Meteorite seals ===
During the years reign of Đồng Khánh a meteorite seal (ấn làm từ thiên thạch) was specifically made for him. In order to show friendship between France and Emperor Đồng Khánh, the French government commissioned a special gift as Stanislas-Étienne Meunier, geologist, mineralogist, and scientific journalist, wrote: "For the Son of Heaven like Đồng Khánh, nothing is better than giving him a treasure from heaven. So, I ask our government to try to find a meteorite, then carve it and turn it into a precious seal." to the President of France who accepted his proposal and Stanislas-Étienne Meunier immediately began looking for the perfect meteorite to make the treasure.

Stanislas-Étienne Meunier had to go everywhere to find a satisfactory meteorite, in the end he found it in the city of Vienna, Austria-Hungary, where he bought a rock that fell to the earth on 30 January 1868 near Pułtusk, Vistula Land, Russia (present-day Pułtusk, Mazovia, Poland). Stanislas-Étienne Meunier described the meteorite as not being cracked and having a beautiful appearance, and a suitable size. Meunier was happy with the specimen and brought it back to the jeweler to manufacture.

The seal itself is made of pure gold and is engraved with words "Le gouvernement de la République Française à S. M. Dong-Khanh, roi d'Annam" (English: The government of the French Republic, his royal highness Đồng Khánh, King of Annam; Vietnamese: Chính phủ cộng hoà Pháp tặng vua Đồng Khánh, quốc vương xứ An Nam) in French.

According to the book Đồng Khánh chính yếu the seal was presented to Đồng Khánh in December 1887. Upon receiving the seal Đồng Khánh thanked the French government and issued a statement to the people that read:

"Quan Khâm sứ đại thần Hách Tô (赫托) hiện đóng ở kinh đô vâng mệnh mang tới tặng cho một chiếc ấn ngọc do các công khanh trong triều đình quý quốc chế tạo ra, trên có khắc bốn chữ Triều đình lập tín (Triều đình đặt ra để làm tín), lại bảo rằng của đại Hoàng Đế nước Đại Pháp gửi tặng, vốn là ngọc ở trong tảng đá do trời ứng điềm lành giáng xuống, nước Đại Pháp tìm thấy đem bổ ra lấy nguyên khối chế tác thành ấn. Đó thực là một báu vật hiếm thấy, từ phôi thô mài giũa thành khí quả là vô cùng khó. Nay đem sang tặng cho để từ nay nếu có việc gì cần phải thông báo với triều đình Đại Pháp thì dùng ấn ấy để làm tin."

— Đồng Khánh chính yếu

Which translated into English means "Resident-superior Séraphin Hector, now stationed in the imperial capital city, presented a gift in the form of a jade seal made by the noble servants of the court. The court created, on engraved with four words "The Court of Establishment", said that it was given by the Emperor of Great(er) France. (Note: At this point in time France was a Republic, but Đồng Khánh refers to the president as "Hoàng Đế nước Đại Pháp" (皇帝渃大法, "Emperor of Great(er) France).) It was a rock which descended upon the earth by heavenly goodness, and Great(er) France found the rock and made a seal out of it. It is truly a most precious and rare treasure, most very difficult to acquire. The French now brought it as a gift so that from now on, if there is something that needs to be reported to the government of Great(er) France, then I shall use this special seal to make news."

=== Silver seals ===
During its existence the Nguyễn dynasty created a number of silver seals (Ấn đúc bằng bạc). According to the book Nguyễn Phúc tộc thế phả prince Nguyễn Phúc Miên Tông was sent to study during the reign of his father in the year of the Tiger (năm Canh Dần, 1830). There he was given the nickname Trường Khánh công. In the same year Emperor Minh Mạng (Minh Mệnh) gave Nguyễn Phúc Miên Tông the gift of a gold-plated silver seal, with a vertical dragon-shaped seal knob, this dragon was depicted with a raised head, a curved back, a bent tail, and four-claws. The back of the seal is engraved with 2 lines of Chinese characters, indicating that the seal weighs 44 ounces, 9, 4 centimeters and notes the date of its creation. The inscription on this silver seal is Trường Khánh công ấn.

During the reign of the Thiệu Trị Emperor a silver seal with the inscription Phúc Tuy quan phòng was created. Its seal knob is shaped as a Kỳ lân with an upturned head, arched back, bent tail, and 4 loose legs. It was cast during the 2nd year of Thiệu Trị or the year of the Ox (Năm Tân Sửu, 1841). This seal was gifted to Prince Nguyễn Phúc Hồng Nhậm in the year 1843.

=== Bronze seals ===
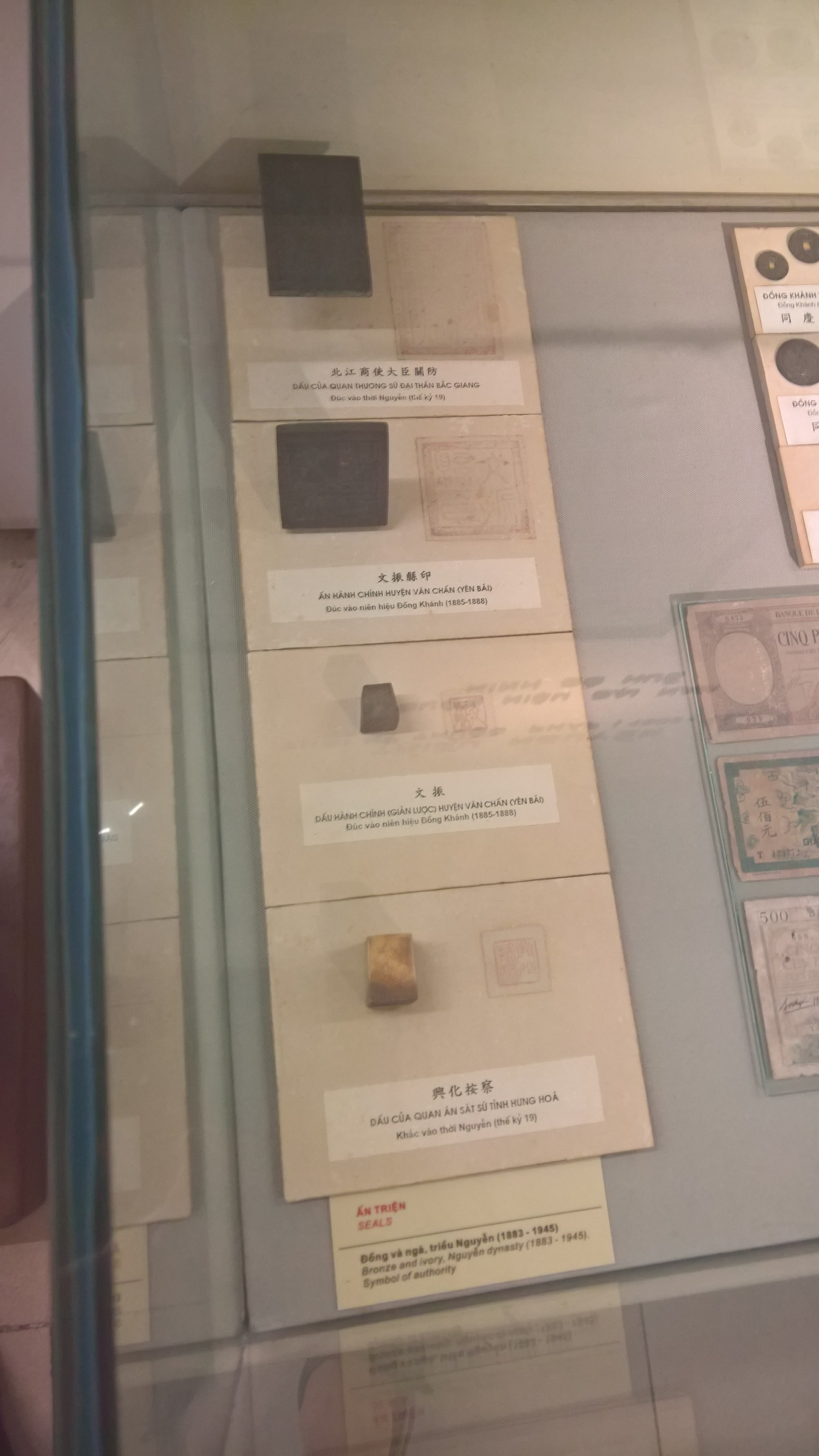
Bronze and ivory seals of the Nguyễn dynasty on display at the National Museum of Vietnamese History, Hanoi.

Bronze seals, known in Vietnamese as Ấn triện bằng đồng (印篆評銅), were seals generally reserved for people of a lower status than the imperial family, but due to the financial difficulties Đại Nam was in due to war reparations imposed by the French and Spanish, the Tự Đức Emperor confiscated gold seals given to the princes and princesses of the Imperial family and replaced them with identical bronze seals. The order the Tự Đức Emperor made read as: "All kinds of ngân sách, ấn (seals), quan, and quan phòng of princes and princesses must be returned and melted down into bars for use. But according to the original pattern be cast into bronze again for convenience and everlasting storage." (Các loại ngân sách, ấn, quan, quan phòng của các hoàng thân, công chúa phải nộp và nấu chảy thành thỏi để dùng. Nhưng theo mẫu đổi đúc lại bằng đồng để tiện cho đời đời lưu giữ). After the year 1869 almost all seals of the imperial court (excluding the ones for the Emperor and some select princes) were primarily made of bronze.

Bronze seals were cast for many different types of government offices and functions such as mandarins, other bureaucrats, administrative divisions, medals, signatures, Etc. and the knobs of bronze seals may be decorated with a Chinese "unicorn", a Chinese guardian lion, a straight shape, or a ring shape among others. These seal knobs had different levels of heights and weights, but it was absolutely impossible for a bronze seal to have a dragon-shaped seal knob as these were only reserved for seals of more precious materials.

== List of imperial seals of the Nguyễn dynasty ==
=== Emperors ===
List of lordly and royal seals of the Nguyễn lords and imperial seals of the Nguyễn dynasty:

- Orange text = Indicates that the inscription is written in Traditional Chinese characters.
- Fuchsia text = Indicates that the inscription is written in Latin script.

Inscription (chữ Quốc ngữ)	Inscription (chữ Hán)	English translation	Use	Created under (Year, if known)	Seal knob	Dimensions	Composition	Image of the seal	Print of the seal
Trấn thủ tướng quân chi ấn	鎮守將軍之印	"Seal of the guardian general."	On diplomatic documents of the Nguyễn lords.	Nguyễn Phúc Nguyên (阮福源)				Presumably no longer exists	
Thủ tín thiên hạ văn vũ quyền hành	取信天下文武權行	"Win the trust of all under heaven, seal for military texts."	The seal is used in documents of the proclamations of expeditions.	Nguyễn Phúc Chu (阮福淍); 1703	Chinese guardian lion		Gold		
Đại Việt quốc Nguyễn Chúa vĩnh trấn chi bảo	大越國阮𪐴永鎮之寶	"Seal of the eternal government of the Nguyễn Lords of the kingdom of Great(er) Viêt"	Heirloom seal of the Nguyễn lords (and later the Nguyễn dynasty).	Nguyễn Phúc Chu (阮福淍); 1709	Chinese guardian lion		Gold		
Quốc Vương chi ấn	國王之印	"Seal of the King of the nation"	Royal seal of Đàng Trong.	Nguyễn Phúc Khoát (阮福濶); 1744					
Chế cáo chi bảo (Chế cáo chi bửu)	制誥之寶	"Seal of creation."	Used for announcing deaths (moratorium) and military commands.	Gia Long (嘉隆); 1802	Dragon		Gold		
Quốc gia tín bảo (Quốc gia tín bửu)	國家信寶	"Seal of the nation."	Used to close documents to summon generals or punish soldiers.	Gia Long (嘉隆); 1802	Dragon		Gold		
Phong tặng chi bảo (Phong tặng chi bửu)	封贈之寶	"Seal of a most honourable gift."		Gia Long (嘉隆); 1802	Squatting dragon		Silver		
Việt Nam Quốc Vương chi ấn Manchu language text	越南國王之印	"Seal of the King of Vietnam".	Used for official correspondence with the court of the Qing dynasty.	Gia Long (嘉隆); 1804		Camel	gold-plated silver	Seal destroyed by the French.	
Phúc Minh chi ấn									
Mệnh đức chi bảo (Mệnh đức chi bửu)	命德之寶	"Seal of destiny."	This treasure was used to reward those who have done a meritorious service for the country and to promote mandarin-officials to mandarin-ministers.	Gia Long (嘉隆)	Dragon		Silver		
Sắc chính vạn dân chi bảo (Sắc chính vạn dân chi bửu)	敕正萬民之寶	"Seal of the honour of ten thousand citizens."	On national decrees and proclamations to be read to the entire country.	Gia Long (嘉隆)			Gold		
Trị lịch minh thời chi bảo (Trị lịch minh thời chi bửu)	治歷明時之寶	"Seal of history and time."	For the official calendar of the Nguyễn dynasty.	Gia Long (嘉隆)			Gold		
Ngự tiền chi bảo (Ngự tiền chi bửu)	御前之寶	"Seal of the imperial front."	Used on proclamations following the reign era and the two Chinese characters "Khâm thử" (欽此).	Gia Long (嘉隆)	Dragon		Gold		
Thảo tội an dân chi bảo (Thảo tội an dân chi bửu)	討罪安民之寶	"Seal of dispensing punishments."	Used when sending out orders to the military dispatching them for combat.	Gia Long (嘉隆)	Dragon		Gold		
Văn lý mật sát	文理密察	"(Seal of) literary scrutiny and criticisms."	For documents where there are corrections, additions, and "punctuation marks" (contiguous marks), or for stamping in indexes, chapters that have been erased or added or where they are any other additions or corrections of two important documents.	Minh Mạng (明命)	Dragon		Gold		
Hoàng Đế chi bảo (Hoàng Đế chi bửu)	皇帝之寶	"Seal of the Emperor."		Minh Mạng (明命); 1823	Dragon		Gold		
Hoàng Đế tôn thân chi bảo (Hoàng Đế tôn thân chi bửu)	皇帝尊親之寶	"Seal of the Emperor's most honourable respect."	In documents to leaders of religious sects.	Minh Mạng (明命); 1827	Dragon		Gold		
Sắc mệnh chi bảo (Sắc mệnh chi bửu)	敕命之寶	"Seal of destiny." "Treasure of destiny."	For rank promotion of civilian and military officials as well as title conferment on deities and humans.	Minh Mạng (明命); 1827	A rolling dragon and its face is molded with the four words "Sắc mệnh chi bảo" in relief.	14 cm x 14 cm	Gold		
Khâm văn chi tỷ	欽文之璽	"Seal of respecting literature." (Note: Or "Seal for the respect of literary works".)	To promote culture and education. Used in contexts like inspecting exams, opening up new schools, Etc.	Minh Mạng (明命); 1827	Dragon		Gold		
Duệ võ chi tỷ	叡武之璽	"Seal of military wisdom."	For documents related to soldiers including military exams and to emphasise martial virtues and promote the military.	Minh Mạng (明命); 1827	Dragon		Gold		
Phong tặng chi bảo (Phong tặng chi bửu)	封贈之寶	"Seal of a most honourable gift."		Minh Mạng (明命)					
Sắc chính vạn dân chi bảo (Sắc chính vạn dân chi bửu)	敕正萬民之寶	"Seal of the honour of ten thousand citizens."	On national decrees and proclamations to be read to the entire country.	Minh Mạng (明命)					
Trị lịch minh thời chi bảo (Trị lịch minh thời chi bửu)	治歷明時之寶	"Seal of history and time."	For the official calendar of the Nguyễn dynasty.	Minh Mạng (明命)					
Ngự tiền chi bảo (Ngự tiền chi bửu)	御前之寶	"Seal of the imperial front."	Used on proclamations following the reign era and the two Chinese characters "Khâm thử" (欽此).	Minh Mạng (明命)	Dragon				
Vạn Thọ vô cương	萬壽無疆	"Ten thousand longevities with no boundaries."		Minh Mạng (明命); 1828					
Minh Mạng thần hàn	明命宸翰	"Imperial correspondence of Minh Mạng."		Minh Mạng (明命)					
Hoàng Đế chi tỷ	皇帝之璽	"Seal of the Emperor." (Note: Sometimes translated as "The jade seal of the king" as the Chinese term "Hoàng Đế" (黃帝) is popularly translated in Vietnam as "King".)	Documents in amnesty or giving priority for the masses.	Minh Mạng (明命); 1835	Two dragons leaning back to each other	8.27 cm high, 10.5 cm wide, and 4.22 cm thick.	Jade		
Tuấn triết văn minh	濬哲文明	"Wise and civilized."	To affix to history books.	Minh Mạng (明命); 1836			White jade		
Quan văn hóa thành	觀文化成	"Seeing all things are according to the culture that achieves."	To affix to history books.	Minh Mạng (明命); 1836			White jade		
Khuê bích lưu quang	奎璧流光	"Emerald jade."	To affix to history books.	Minh Mạng (明命); 1836			White jade		
Tân hựu nhật tân	新又日新	"The addition of a new day."	To affix to history books.	Minh Mạng (明命); 1836			White jade		
Hành tại chi tỷ	行在之璽	"Seal of a temporary residence."		Minh Mạng (明命); 1837		7.7 cm high, 9.8 x 9.8 cm wide, and 1.4 cm thick.	Green jade		
Đại Nam Hoàng Đế chi tỷ	大南皇帝之璽	"Seal of the Emperor of the Great South."	To chop on the decrees for foreign cases.	Minh Mạng (明命); 1839	Two dragons facing outwards	10.5 cm high, 12.4 cm wide, and 5.3 cm thick.	Green jade		
Đại Nam Thiên tử chi tỷ	大南天子之璽	"Seal of the Son of Heaven of the Great South."	To chop on the decrees for the nation.	Minh Mạng (明命); 1840			Jade		
Thánh Tổ Nhân Hoàng Đế chi bảo		"Seal for honouring the ancestors of the Emperor."	To be used in the Thế Miếu shrine to honour the dead Minh Mạng Emperor.	Thiệu Trị (紹治); 1841	Dragon		Gold		
Nhân Tuyên Từ Khánh Thái Hoàng Thái hậu chi bảo (Nhân Tuyên Từ Khánh Thái Hoàng Thái hậu chi bửu)	仁宣慈慶太皇太后之寶	"Seal of the Benevolent Great Empress."	To honour Trần Thị Đang.	Thiệu Trị (紹治); 1841	Dragon		Gold		
Nhân Hoàng hậu chi bảo (Nhân Hoàng hậu chi bửu)	仁皇后之寶	"Seal of Empress Nhân."	To honour Hồ Thị Hoa.	Thiệu Trị (紹治); 1841	Dragon		Gold		
Đại Nam Hoàng Đế chi tỷ	大南皇帝之璽	"Seal of the Emperor of the Great South."	Mainly used on diplomatic documents.	Thiệu Trị (紹治); 1845	Tiger	9.1 cm high, 10.25 cm wide, and 4.21 cm thick	Jade		
Thần hàn chi tỷ	宸翰之璽	"Seal of palace literature."	For letters and edicts of the Emperor written in vermilion ink.	Thiệu Trị (紹治); 1845			Jade		
Đại Nam hiệp kỷ lịch chi bảo (Đại Nam hiệp kỷ lịch chi bửu)	大南協紀曆之寶	"Seal of binding the Great Southern calendar."	Used for binding on imperial calendars printed and issued each year.	Thiệu Trị (紹治); 1845	Dragon		Gold		
Đại Nam thụ thiên vĩnh mệnh truyền quốc tỷ	大南受天永命傳國璽	"The Great South has the eternal Mandate of Heaven, jade seal for the transmission of the legacy of the Empire."	It was used on diplomatic decrees. Heirloom seal of the country.	Thiệu Trị (紹治); 1846	A rolling dragon	14.5 cm high, 13x12.7 wide, and 4.25 cm thick	Jade		
Tề gia chi bảo (Tề gia chi bửu)	齊家之寶	"Seal of uniformity in the household."	For examples and instructions within the imperial home.	Thiệu Trị (紹治)					
Hoan phụng ngũ đại đồng đường nhất thống Thiệu Trị chi bảo (Hoan phụng ngũ đại đồng đường nhất thống Thiệu Trị chi bửu)	歡奉五大同堂一統紹治之寶	"Thiệu Trị's seal to celebrate the unification of the five great families."		Thiệu Trị (紹治)		Press face round in shape, diameter 10.8 cm. The outer rim is 5 cm wide.	Ivory		
Tự Đức ngự lãm chi bảo (Tự Đức ngự lãm chi bửu)	嗣德御覽之寶	"Tự Đức's Imperial inspection seal."		Tự Đức (嗣德)					
Tự Đức thần khuê	嗣德宸奎	"Imperial correspondence of Tự Đức."		Tự Đức (嗣德)		4.22 cm high, oval face, 4.35 cm long, 2.3 cm wide, and 1.78 cm thick.	Jade		
Tự Đức thần hàn	嗣德宸翰	"Imperial correspondence of Tự Đức."		Tự Đức (嗣德)					
Ngự tiền chi bảo (Ngự tiền chi bửu)	御前之寶	"Seal of the imperial front."	Used on proclamations following the reign era and the two Chinese characters "Khâm thử" (欽此).	Đồng Khánh (同慶); 1886			gold		
Le gouvernement de la République Française à S. M. Dong-Khanh, roi d'Annam; Triều đình lập tín	朝廷立信	"The government of the Republic of France, his royal highness Đồng Khánh, King of Annam." "Seal of the imperial household."	Interactions between the imperial court and the French.	Đồng Khánh (同慶)			Pultusk (meteorite) and gold		
Tải Toả Võ Công	載纘武功	"Carrying out martial arts." "Continue military work."	A secret seal used for resistance against the French.	Duy Tân (維新); 1916			Wood		
Khải Định thần hàn	啟定宸翰	"Imperial correspondence of Khải Định."		Khải Định (啟定)					
Khải Định Hoàng Đế chi tỷ	啟定皇帝之璽	"Seal of the Khải Định Emperor."		Khải Định (啟定)					
Khải Định Đại Nam Hoàng Đế; Khai-Dinh Empereur d'Annam	啟定大南皇帝	"Khải Định, Emperor of the Great South." "Khải Định, Emperor of Annam."	Used to stamp French language sides of bilingual documents, such as awards and decorations.	Khải Định (啟定)			Gold and Pietra dura		
Khải Định thần khuê	啟定宸奎	"Imperial correspondence of Khải Định."	Used to stamp Classical Chinese language sides of bilingual documents, such as awards and decorations.	Khải Định (啟定)	Chinese guardian lion		Ivory		
Khải Định Thần Hàn	啓定宸翰	"Official handwriting of Khải Định."	Used on documents with the Khải Định Emperor's personal handwriting on it.	Khải Định (啟定)					
Ngự tiền chi bảo (Ngự tiền chi bửu)	御前之寶	"Seal of the imperial front."	Used on proclamations following the reign era and the two Chinese characters "Khâm thử" (欽此).	Khải Định (啟定)					
Hoàng thái tử bảo	皇太子寶	"Seal of the imperial crown prince."		Bảo Đại (保大); 1939			Gold		

=== Empress-Consorts and the imperial family ===
Inscription (chữ Quốc ngữ)	Inscription (chữ Hán)	English translation	Use	Created under (Year, if known)	Seal knob	Dimensions	Composition	Image of the seal	Print of the seal
Hoàng hậu chi bảo	皇后之寶	"Seal of the Empress-consort".			Dragon		Gold		
Nam Phương Hoàng hậu	南芳皇后	"Empress-consort Nam Phương".	The personal seal of Nam Phương.	Bảo Đại (保大)					
Hoàng thái tử bảo	皇太子寶	"Seal of the imperial crown prince."	The personal seal of Crown Prince Nguyễn Phúc Bảo Long.	Bảo Đại (保大); 1939			Gold		

== Imperial seals on documents ==
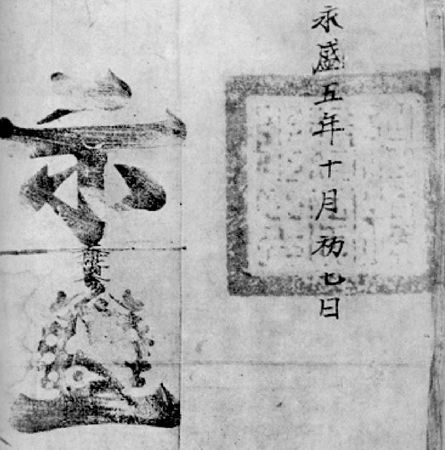
The Tổng trấn Tướng quân chi ấn used on a document using the Vĩnh Thịnh (永盛, 1706–1719) reign era of the Revival Lê dynasty.

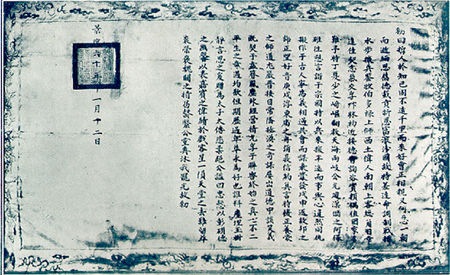
A document from 1801 using the Đại Việt quốc Nguyễn Chúa vĩnh trấn chi bảo seal, notice the fact that Lord Nguyễn Phúc Ánh was still using the Cảnh Hưng (景興, 1740–1786) reign era of the Revival Lê Dynasty Emperor Lê Hiển Tông (黎顯宗).

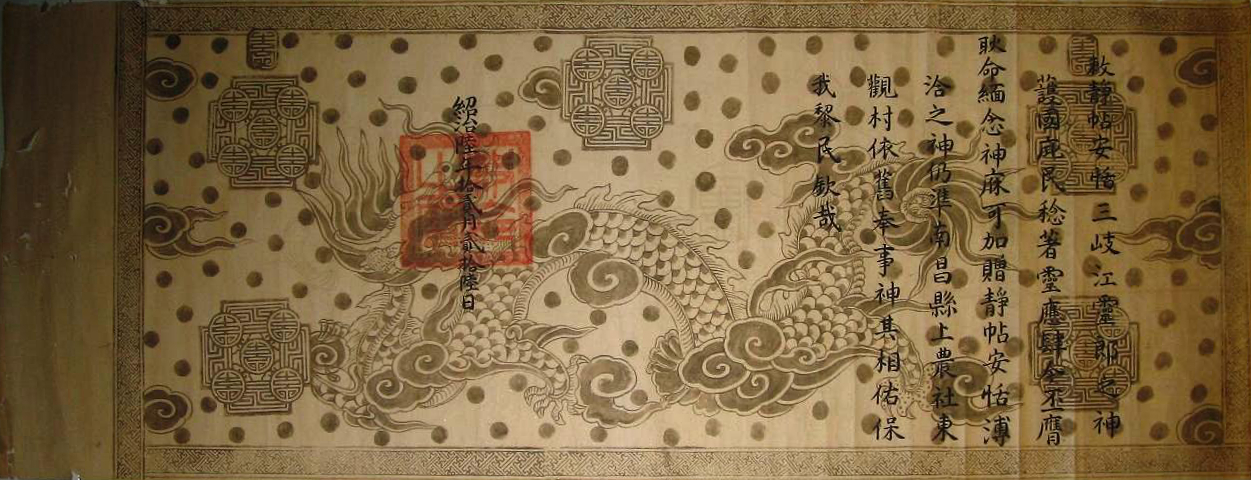
An imperial edict issued by the Thiệu Trị Emperor containing the Sắc mệnh chi bảo (敕命之寶) seal.

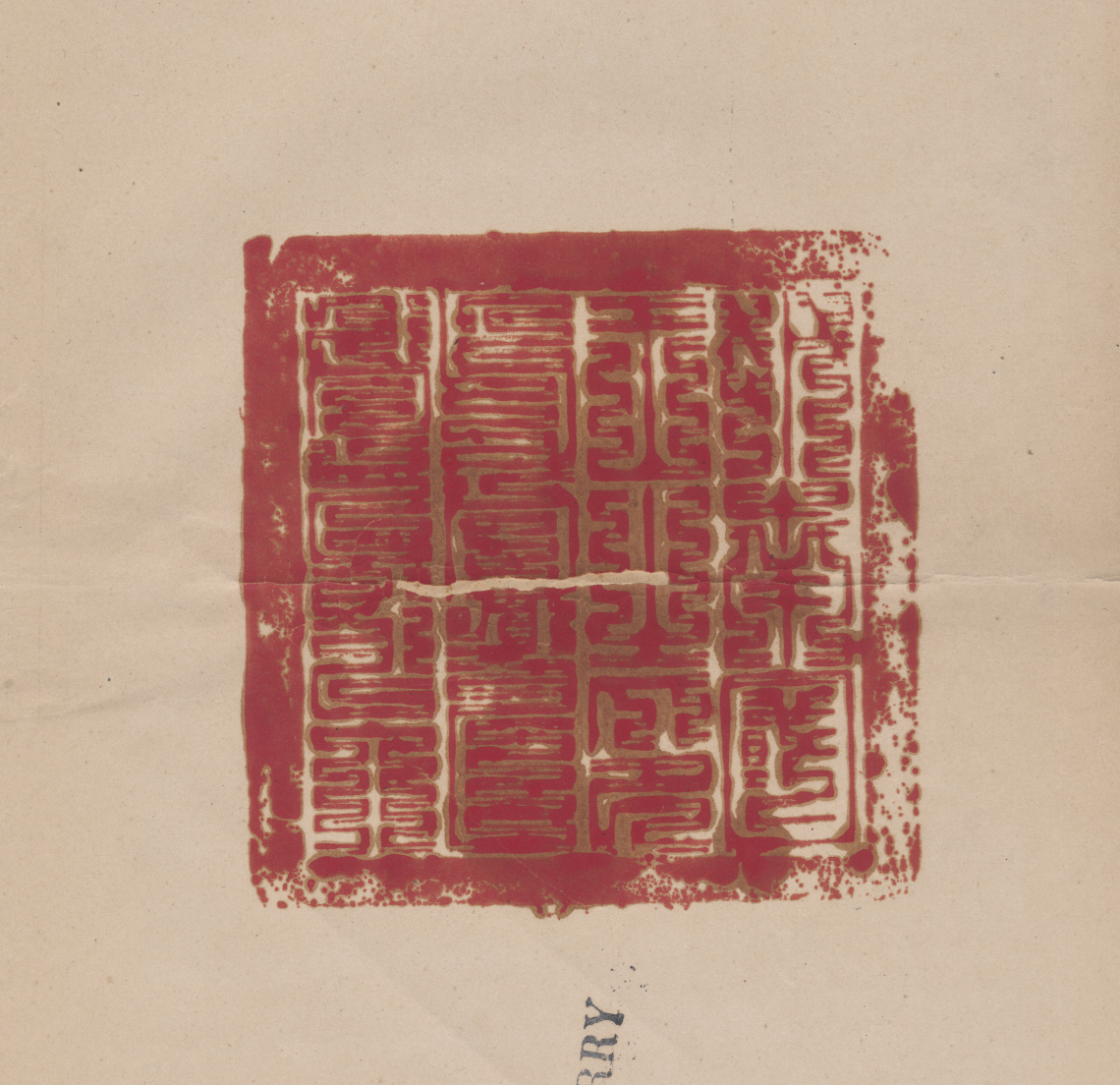
The seal of "the Emperor of Annam" used in correspondence with France in 1885.

== List of office seals of the Nguyễn dynasty government ==
=== Imperial government ministries and agencies ===
==== Imperial secretaries (Tam Nội Viện) ====
Office or organisation	Inscription (chữ Quốc ngữ)	Inscription (chữ Hán)	Image of the seal	Print of the seal
Office seal of the Thị Thư Viện.				
Office seal of the Thị Hàn viện.				
Office seal of the Nội Hàn Viện.				

==== Imperial cabinets ====
Office or organisation	Inscription (chữ Quốc ngữ)	Inscription (chữ Hán)	Image of the seal	Print of the seal
Office seal of the Văn thư phòng (文書房).	Văn thư phòng quan phòng	文書房關防		
Office seal of the Cabinet of the Nguyễn dynasty (內閣, Nội các).	Sung biện Nội các sự vụ Quan phòng	充辨内閣事務關防		
Office seal of the Cabinet of the Nguyễn dynasty (內閣, Nội các). (Note: From the Khải Định period until the Cabinet was abolished in the year Bảo Đại 3 (1934) and replaced with the Ngự tiền văn phòng.)	Sung lý nội các sự vụ Quan phòng	充理内閣事務關防		
Great seal of the Cabinet of the Nguyễn dynasty (內閣, Nội các) used between 1931 and 1933.	Nội các chi ấn	內閣之印		
Small seal of the Cabinet of the Nguyễn dynasty (內閣, Nội các).	Nội các	內閣		
Great seal of the Ngự tiền văn phòng (御前文房).	Ngự tiền văn phòng chi ấn	御前文房之印		
Small seal of the Ngự tiền văn phòng (御前文房).	Ngự tiền văn phòng	御前文房		

==== Ministries (Bộ) ====
Office or organisation	Inscription (chữ Quốc ngữ)	Inscription (chữ Hán)	Image of the seal	Print of the seal
Office seal of the Ministry of Personnel (吏部, Lại Bộ).	Lại Bộ đường chi ấn	吏部堂之印		
Office seal of the Ministry of Personnel (吏部, Lại Bộ).	Lại Bộ chi ấn	吏部之印		
Patrol march (tuần hành) seal of the Ministry of Personnel (吏部, Lại Bộ).	Lại Bộ hành ấn	吏部行印		
Office seal of the Ministry of Personnel (吏部, Lại Bộ).	Lại Bộ	吏部		
Office seal of the Ministry of Revenue (戶部, Hộ Bộ).	Hộ Bộ đường chi ấn	戶部堂之印		
Office seal of the Ministry of Revenue (戶部, Hộ Bộ).	Hộ Bộ chi ấn	戶部之印		
Patrol march (tuần hành) seal of the Ministry of Revenue (戶部, Hộ Bộ).	Hộ Bộ hành ấn	戶部行印		
Office seal of the Ministry of Revenue (戶部, Hộ Bộ).	Hộ Bộ	戶部		
Office seal of the Ministry of Rites (禮部, Lễ Bộ).	Lễ Bộ đường chi ấn	禮部堂之印		
Office seal of the Ministry of Rites (禮部, Lễ Bộ).	Lễ Bộ chi ấn	禮部之印		
Patrol march (tuần hành) seal of the Ministry of Rites (禮部, Lễ Bộ).	Lễ Bộ hành ấn	禮部行印		
Office seal of the Ministry of Rites and Public Works (部禮儀工作, Bộ Lễ nghi - Công tác).	Lễ công	禮工		
Office seal of the Ministry of Rites and Ceremonies (部禮儀, Bộ Lễ nghi).	Lễ nghi	禮儀		
Office seal of the Ministry of War (兵部, Binh Bộ).	Binh Bộ đường chi ấn	兵部堂之印		
Office seal of the Ministry of War (兵部, Binh Bộ).	Binh Bộ chi ấn	兵部之印		
Patrol march (tuần hành) seal of the Ministry of War (兵部, Binh Bộ).	Binh Bộ hành ấn	兵部行印		
Office seal of the Ministry of War (兵部, Binh Bộ).	Binh Bộ	兵部		
Office seal of the Ministry of Justice (刑部, Hình Bộ).	Hình Bộ đường chi ấn	刑部堂之印		
Office seal of the Ministry of Justice (刑部, Hình Bộ).	Hình Bộ chi ấn	刑部之印		
Patrol march (tuần hành) seal of the Ministry of Justice (刑部, Hình Bộ).	Hình Bộ hành ấn	刑部行印		
Office seal of the Ministry of Justice (刑部, Hình Bộ).	Hình Bộ	刑部		
Office seal of the Ministry of Public Works (工部, Công Bộ).	Công Bộ đường chi ấn	工部堂之印		
Office seal of the Ministry of Public Works (工部, Công Bộ).	Công Bộ chi ấn	工部之印		
Patrol march (tuần hành) seal of the Ministry of Public Works (工部, Công Bộ).	Công Bộ hành ấn	工部行印		
Office seal of the Ministry of Public Works (工部, Công Bộ).	Công Bộ	工部		
Office seal of the Ministry of Education (學部, Học Bộ).	Học Bộ chi ấn	學部之印		
Office seal of the Ministry of Education (學部, Học Bộ).	Học Bộ	學部		
Great seal of the Ministry of National Education (部國家教育, Bộ Quốc gia Giáo dục). (Note: In Classical Chinese the ministry was called the Quốc dân Giáo dục Bộ (國民教育部).)	Giáo dục Bộ ấn	教育部印		
Small seal of the Ministry of National Education (部國家教育, Bộ Quốc gia Giáo dục).	Giáo dục	教育		
Office seal of the Ministry of Education and Fine Arts (部教育𡝕美術, Bộ Giáo dục và Mỹ thuật).	Giáo dục Mỹ thuật	教育美術		
Office seal of the Ministry of Economic Affairs (經濟部, Kinh-tế Bộ).	Kinh tế	經濟		
Office seal of the Ministry of Economic Affairs (經濟部, Kinh-tế Bộ). (Note: Used during the Empire of Vietnam period.)	Kinh tế	經濟		
Office seal of the Ministry of Public Finance (部財政, Bộ Tài chính).	Tài chính	財政		
Office seal of the Ministry of Justice (部司法, Bộ Tư pháp).	Tư pháp	司法		
Office seal of the Ministry of Youth Affairs (部青年, Bộ Thanh niên).				
Office seal of the Ministry of Public Works (部公政, Bộ Công chính).				
Office seal of the Ministry of Internal Affairs (部內務, Bộ Nội vụ).				
Office seal of the Ministry of Foreign Affairs (部外交, Bộ Ngoại giao).				
Office seal of the Ministry of Health and Relief (部醫濟𡝕救濟, Bộ Y tế và Cứu tế).				
Office seal of the Ministry of Material Assistance (部接濟, Bộ Tiếp tế).				

==== Ministerial staff ====
Rank	Inscription (chữ Quốc ngữ)	Inscription (chữ Hán)	Image of the seal	Print of the seal
Office seal of the Thượng thư (minister) of the Ministry of Personnel (吏部尚書, Lại Bộ Thượng thư).	Lại Bộ Thượng thư quan phòng	吏部尚書關防		
Office seal of the Thượng thư (minister) of the Ministry of Revenue (戶部尚書, Hộ Bộ Thượng thư).	Hộ Bộ Thượng thư quan phòng	戶部尚書關防		
Office seal of the Thượng thư (minister) of the Ministry of Rites (禮部尚書, Lễ Bộ Thượng thư).	Lễ Bộ Thượng thư quan phòng	禮部尚書關防		
Office seal of the Thượng thư (minister) of the Ministry of War (兵部尚書, Binh Bộ Thượng thư).	Binh Bộ Thượng thư quan phòng	兵部尚書關防		
Office seal of the Thượng thư (minister) of the Ministry of Justice (刑部尚書, Hình Bộ Thượng thư).	Hình Bộ Thượng thư quan phòng	刑部尚書關防		
Office seal of the Thượng thư (minister) of the Ministry of Public Works (工部尚書, Công Bộ Thượng thư).	Công Bộ Thượng thư quan phòng	工部尚書關防		
Office seal of the Left Deputy Minister (Tả Tham tri) of the Ministry of Personnel (吏部左參知, Lại Bộ Tả Tham tri).	Lại Bộ Tả Tham tri quan phòng	吏部左參知關防		
Office seal of the Left Deputy Minister (Tả Tham tri) of the Ministry of Revenue (戶部左參知, Hộ Bộ Tả Tham tri).	Hộ Bộ Tả Tham tri quan phòng	戶部左參知關防		
Office seal of the Left Deputy Minister (Tả Tham tri) of the Ministry of Rites (禮部左參知, Lễ Bộ Tả Tham tri).	Lễ Bộ Tả Tham tri quan phòng	禮部左參知關防		
Office seal of the Left Deputy Minister (Tả Tham tri) of the Ministry of War (兵部左參知, Binh Bộ Tả Tham tri).	Binh Bộ Tả Tham tri quan phòng	兵部左參知關防		
Office seal of the Left Deputy Minister (Tả Tham tri) of the Ministry of Justice (刑部左參知, Hình Bộ Tả Tham tri).	Hình Bộ Tả Tham tri quan phòng	刑部左參知關防		
Office seal of the Left Deputy Minister (Tả Tham tri) of the Ministry of Public Works (工部左參知, Công Bộ Tả Tham tri).	Công Bộ Tả Tham tri quan phòng	工部左參知關防		
Office seal of the Right Deputy Minister (Hữu Tham tri) of the Ministry of Personnel (吏部右參知, Lại Bộ Hữu Tham tri).	Lại Bộ Hữu Tham tri quan phòng	吏部右參知關防		
Office seal of the Right Deputy Minister (Hữu Tham tri) of the Ministry of Revenue (戶部右參知, Hộ Bộ Hữu Tham tri).	Hộ Bộ Hữu Tham tri quan phòng	戶部右參知關防		
Office seal of the Right Deputy Minister (Hữu Tham tri) of the Ministry of Rites (禮部右參知, Lễ Bộ Hữu Tham tri).	Lễ Bộ Hữu Tham tri quan phòng	禮部右參知關防		
Office seal of the Right Deputy Minister (Hữu Tham tri) of the Ministry of War (兵部右參知, Binh Bộ Hữu Tham tri).	Binh Bộ Hữu Tham tri quan phòng	兵部右參知關防		
Office seal of the Right Deputy Minister (Hữu Tham tri) of the Ministry of Justice (刑部右參知, Hình Bộ Hữu Tham tri).	Hình Bộ Hữu Tham tri quan phòng	刑部右參知關防		
Office seal of the Right Deputy Minister (Hữu Tham tri) of the Ministry of Public Works (工部右參知, Công Bộ Hữu Tham tri).	Công Bộ Hữu Tham tri quan phòng	工部右參知關防		
Office seal of the Left Vice Minister (Tả Thị lang) of the Ministry of Personnel (吏部左侍郎, Lại Bộ Tả Thị lang).	Lại Bộ Tả Thị lang quan phòng	吏部左侍郎關防		
Office seal of the Left Vice Minister (Tả Thị lang) of the Ministry of Revenue (戶部左侍郎, Hộ Bộ Tả Thị lang).	Hộ Bộ Tả Thị lang quan phòng	戶部左侍郎關防		
Office seal of the Left Vice Minister (Tả Thị lang) of the Ministry of Rites (禮部左侍郎, Lễ Bộ Tả Thị lang).	Lễ Bộ Tả Thị lang quan phòng	禮部左侍郎關防		
Office seal of the Left Vice Minister (Tả Thị lang) of the Ministry of War (兵部左侍郎, Binh Bộ Tả Thị lang).	Binh Bộ Tả Thị lang quan phòng	兵部左侍郎關防		
Office seal of the Left Vice Minister (Tả Thị lang) of the Ministry of Justice (刑部左侍郎, Hình Bộ Tả Thị lang).	Hình Bộ Tả Thị lang quan phòng	刑部左侍郎關防		
Office seal of the Left Vice Minister (Tả Thị lang) of the Ministry of Public Works (工部左侍郎, Công Bộ Tả Thị lang).	Công Bộ Tả Thị lang quan phòng	工部左侍郎關防		
Office seal of the Right Vice Minister (Hữu Thị lang) of the Ministry of Personnel (吏部右侍郎, Lại Bộ Hữu Thị lang).	Lại Bộ Hữu Thị lang quan phòng	吏部右侍郎關防		
Office seal of the Right Vice Minister (Hữu Thị lang) of the Ministry of Revenue (戶部右侍郎, Hộ Bộ Hữu Thị lang).	Hộ Bộ Hữu Thị lang quan phòng	戶部右侍郎關防		
Office seal of the Right Vice Minister (Hữu Thị lang) of the Ministry of Rites (禮部右侍郎, Lễ Bộ Hữu Thị lang).	Lễ Bộ Hữu Thị lang quan phòng	禮部右侍郎關防		
Office seal of the Right Vice Minister (Hữu Thị lang) of the Ministry of War (兵部右侍郎, Binh Bộ Hữu Thị lang).	Binh Bộ Hữu Thị lang quan phòng	兵部右侍郎關防		
Office seal of the Right Vice Minister (Hữu Thị lang) of the Ministry of Justice (刑部右侍郎, Hình Bộ Hữu Thị lang).	Hình Bộ Hữu Thị lang quan phòng	刑部右侍郎關防		
Office seal of the Right Vice Minister (Hữu Thị lang) of the Ministry of Public Works (工部右侍郎, Công Bộ Hữu Thị lang).	Công Bộ Hữu Thị lang quan phòng	工部右侍郎關防		
Office seal of the Prosecutor (Biện lý) of the Ministry of Personnel (辦理吏部, Biện lý Lại Bộ).	Biện lý Lại Bộ quan phòng	辦理吏部關防		
Office seal of the Prosecutor (Biện lý) of the Ministry of Revenue (辦理戶部, Biện lý Hộ Bộ).	Biện lý Hộ Bộ quan phòng	辦理部關防		
Office seal of the Prosecutor (Biện lý) of the Ministry of Rites (辦理禮部, Biện lý Lễ Bộ).	Biện lý Lễ Bộ quan phòng	辦理戶部關防		
Office seal of the Prosecutor (Biện lý) of the Ministry of War (辦理兵部, Biện lý Binh Bộ).	Biện lý Binh Bộ quan phòng (Note: Used under Đặng Văn Hòa.)	辦理兵部關防		
Office seal of the Prosecutor (Biện lý) of the Ministry of Justice (辦理刑部, Biện lý Hình Bộ).	Biện lý Hình Bộ quan phòng (Note: Used under Nguyễn Kim Bảng.)	辦理刑部關防		
Office seal of the Prosecutor (Biện lý) of the Ministry of Public Works (辦理工部, Biện lý Công Bộ).	Biện lý Công Bộ quan phòng	辦理工部關防		
Office seal of the Bureau Director (Lang trung) of the Ministry of Personnel (吏部郎中, Lại Bộ Lang trung).	Lại Bộ Lang trung quan phòng	吏部郎中關防		
Office seal of the Bureau Director (Lang trung) of the Ministry of Revenue (戶部郎中, Hộ Bộ Lang trung).	Hộ Bộ Lang trung quan phòng	戶部郎中關防		
Office seal of the Bureau Director (Lang trung) of the Ministry of Rites (禮部郎中, Lễ Bộ Lang trung).	Lễ Bộ Lang trung quan phòng	禮部郎中關防		
Office seal of the Bureau Director (Lang trung) of the Ministry of War (兵部郎中, Binh Bộ Lang trung).	Binh Bộ Lang trung quan phòng	兵部郎中關防		
Office seal of the Bureau Director (Lang trung) of the Ministry of Justice (刑部郎中, Hình Bộ Lang trung).	Hình Bộ Lang trung quan phòng	刑部郎中關防		
Office seal of the Bureau Director (Lang trung) of the Ministry of Public Works (工部郎中, Công Bộ Lang trung).	Công Bộ Lang trung quan phòng	工部郎中關防		
Office seal of the Deputy Director of the Bureau (Viên ngoại lang) of the Ministry of Personnel (吏部員外郎, Lại Bộ Viên ngoại lang).	Lại Bộ Viên ngoại lang quan phòng	吏部員外郎關防		
Office seal of the Deputy Director of the Bureau (Viên ngoại lang) of the Ministry of Revenue (戶部員外郎, Hộ Bộ Viên ngoại lang).	Hộ Bộ Viên ngoại lang quan phòng	戶部員外郎關防		
Office seal of the Deputy Director of the Bureau (Viên ngoại lang) of the Ministry of Rites (禮部員外郎, Lễ Bộ Viên ngoại lang).	Lễ Bộ Viên ngoại lang quan phòng	禮部員外郎關防		
Office seal of the Deputy Director of the Bureau (Viên ngoại lang) of the Ministry of War (兵部員外郎, Binh Bộ Viên ngoại lang).	Binh Bộ Viên ngoại lang quan phòng	兵部員外郎關防		
Office seal of the Deputy Director of the Bureau (Viên ngoại lang) of the Ministry of Justice (刑部員外郎, Hình Bộ Viên ngoại lang).	Hình Bộ Viên ngoại lang quan phòng	刑部員外郎關防		
Office seal of the Deputy Director of the Bureau (Viên ngoại lang) of the Ministry of Public Works (工部員外郎, Công Bộ Viên ngoại lang).	Công Bộ Viên ngoại lang quan phòng	工部員外郎關防		

==== Viện ====
Office or organisation	Inscription (chữ Quốc ngữ)	Inscription (chữ Hán)	Image of the seal	Print of the seal
Office seal of the Thái y viện (太醫院).	Thái y viện quan phòng	太醫院關防		
Office seal of the Viện cơ mật (機密院, Cơ mật viện).	Cơ mật viện ấn	機密院印		
Office seal of the Viện cơ mật (機密院, Cơ mật viện).	Cơ mật chi ấn	機密之印		
Dấu kiềm ấn of the Viện cơ mật (機密院, Cơ mật viện).	Cơ mật	機密		
Office seal of the Hàn-lâm Academy (翰林院, Hàn lâm viện).	Hàn lâm viện ấn	翰林院印		
Office seal of the Academy of Scholarly Worthies (集賢院, Tập hiền viện).				
Office seal of the Censorate (都察院, Đô sát viện).	Đô sát viện ấn	都察院印		
Dấu kiềm ấn of the Censorate (都察院, Đô sát viện).	Đô sát	都察		

==== Six Courts (Lục tự) ====
Office or organisation	Inscription (chữ Quốc ngữ)	Inscription (chữ Hán)	Image of the seal	Print of the seal
Office seal of the Court of Judicial Review (大理寺, Đại lý tự).	Đại lý tự ấn	大理寺印		
Dấu kiềm ấn of the Court of Judicial Review (大理寺, Đại lý tự).	Đại lý	大理		
Office seal of the Court of State Ceremonial (鴻臚寺, Hồng lô tự).	Hồng lô tự ấn	鴻臚寺印		
Dấu kiềm ấn of the Court of State Ceremonial (鴻臚寺, Hồng lô tự).	Hồng lô	鴻臚		
Office seal of the Office of Receptions (典客署, Điển khách thự).				
Office seal of the Office of Ceremonials (司儀署, Ti nghi thự).				
Office seal of the Court of Imperial Entertainments (光祿寺, Quang lộc tự).	Quang lộc tự ấn	光祿寺印		
Dấu kiềm ấn of the Court of Imperial Entertainments (光祿寺, Quang lộc tự).	Quang lộc	光祿		
Office seal of the Court of Imperial Seals (尚寶寺, Thượng bảo tự).	Thượng bảo tự ấn	尚寶寺印		
Dấu kiềm ấn of the Court of Imperial Seals (尚寶寺, Thượng bảo tự).	Thượng bảo	尚寶		
Office seal of the Court of the Imperial Stud (太僕寺, Thái bộc tự).	Thái bộc tự ấn	太僕寺印		
Dấu kiềm ấn of the Court of the Imperial Stud (太僕寺, Thái bộc tự).	Thái bộc	太僕		
Office seal of the Court of Imperial Sacrifices (太常寺, Thái thường tự).	Thái thường tự ấn	太常寺印		
Dấu kiềm ấn of the Court of Imperial Sacrifices (太常寺, Thái thường tự).	Thái thường	太常		
Office seal of the Office of the National Altars (郊社署, Giao xã thự).				
Office seal of the Imperial Music Office (太樂署, Thái nhạc thự).				
Office seal of the Office of Drums and Fifes (鼓吹署, Cổ súy thự).				
Office seal of the Imperial Divination Office (太卜署, Thái bốc thự).				
Office seal of the Office of Sacrificial Grains and Animals (廩犧署, Lẫm hi thự).				
Office seal of the Imperial Ancestral Temple Office (太廟署, Thái miếu tự).				

==== Four cabinet sections (Tứ tào) ====
Office or organisation	Inscription (chữ Quốc ngữ)	Inscription (chữ Hán)	Image of the seal	Print of the seal
Office seal of the Palace Library Section (秘書曹, Bí thư tào).				
Office seal of the Imperial Records Section (表簿曹, Biểu bạ tào).				
Office seal of the Imperial Diarists Section (記注曹, Ký chú tào).				
Office seal of the Imperial Diarists Section (承務曹, Thừa vụ tào).				
Office seal of the Imperial Seals Section (尚寶曹, Thượng bảo tào).				

==== Four cabinet offices (Tứ sở) ====
Office or organisation	Inscription (chữ Quốc ngữ)	Inscription (chữ Hán)	Image of the seal	Print of the seal
Office seal of the Palace Library Office (秘書所, Bí thư sở).				
Office seal of the Imperial Records Office (板章所, Bản chương sở).				
Office seal of the Imperial Counseling Office (咨倫所, Ty luân sở).				
Office seal of the Imperial Seals Office (尚寶所, Thượng bảo sở).				

==== Imperial Household Department ====
In the year Gia Long 1 (1802) the Đồ gia lệnh sử ty (圖家令使司) was established. A division of the Đồ gia lệnh sử ty known as the Nội đồ gia (內圖家) was renamed to the Imperial Household Department (內務府, Nội vụ phủ) in the year Minh Mạng 1 (1820), this department was in charge of the internal affairs of the Nguyễn imperial family and the activities of the inner palace.

The Nội tạo sở (内造所), a division of the Imperial Household Department, was the place where the artisans who made utility items for the imperial palace were assembled.

Office or organisation	Inscription (chữ Quốc ngữ)	Inscription (chữ Hán)	Image of the seal	Print of the seal
Office seal of the Đồ gia lệnh sử ty (圖家令使司).				
Office seal of the Nội đồ gia (內圖家).				
Office seal of the Imperial Household Department (內務府, Nội vụ phủ).	Nội vụ phủ quan phòng	內務府關防		
Great seal of the Inspectorate of the Imperial Household Department (清查內務府, Thanh tra Nội vụ phủ).	Thanh tra Nội vụ phủ quan phòng	清查內務府關防		
Kiềm ấn of the Inspectorate of the Imperial Household Department (清查內務府, Thanh tra Nội vụ phủ).	Thanh tra	清查		
Office seal of the Nội tạo sở (内造所).				

===== The Six Thượng =====
The Imperial Household Department was in charge of the six treasures in the palace. To this end, the Minh Mạng Emperor set up six Thượng (尚, "Upper"), or the Lục Thượng (六尚), posts to administer these six treasures. All the mandarins holding these posts were female.

Thượng	Responsibilities of the post	Inscription (chữ Quốc ngữ)	Inscription (chữ Hán)	Image of the seal	Print of the seal
Office seal of the Thượng nghi (尚儀) post.	This post was responsible for the storehouse of ceremonial objects.				
Office seal of the Thượng trân (尚珍) post.	This post was responsible for the storing of treasures and jewels.				
Office seal of the Thượng khí (尚器) post.	This post took charge of the ceramics.				
Office seal of the Thượng phục (尚服) post.	This post kept the blankets, mattresses, and bed sheets.				
Office seal of the Thượng thiện (尚膳) post.	This post took care of food, tea, and fruit.				
Office seal of the Thượng y (尚衣) post.	This post kept the clothes, shoes, and hats.				

===== Storehouses of the Ministry of Public Works =====
In the year Minh Mạng 10 (1829) the employment policy of the imperial artisans changed, placing their management from the Imperial Household Department to the Ministry of Public Works (工部, Công Bộ). The former Imperial Household Department was re-organised into the 9 storehouses. Each of these storehouses was supervised by 3 different ninth-graded mandarins, these mandarins were rotated to another one of the storehouses after 3 years and would, in turn, resume their work at the former storehouse where they had worked before.

Storehouse	English translation	Inscription (chữ Quốc ngữ)	Inscription (chữ Hán)	Image of the seal	Print of the seal
Office seal of the Kim ngân (金銀).	Gold and Silver Storehouse				
Office seal of the Cẩm đoạn (錦緞).	Imported Textile Storehouse				
Office seal of the Nam thái (南線).	Domestic Textile Storehouse				
Office seal of the Bảo thường (寶裳).	Clothing Storehouse				
Office seal of the Pha lê (玻璃).	Crystal Storehouse				
Office seal of the Du lap (油蠟).	Oil Storehouse				
Office seal of the Từ khí (瓷器).	Ceramics Storehouse				
Office seal of the Dược tài (藥財).	Medicine Storehouse				
Office seal of the Diễn hí (演戲).	Props Storehouse				

===== Reformed storehouses after Thiệu Trị 4 (1844) =====
In the year Thiệu Trị 4 (1844), the southern court had re-organised a number of the storehouses. Of these re-organised storehouses, the Cẩm tú and the Trân ngoạn storehouses were managed by eight-grade mandarins. Together, these two storehouses were usually referred to using the abbreviated term as the Cẩm ngoạn (錦玩) storehouse.

Storehouse	Reformed from	Inscription (chữ Quốc ngữ)	Inscription (chữ Hán)	Image of the seal	Print of the seal
Office seal of the Pearl and Gem Storehouse (朱玉, Châu ngọc).	Formerly the Crystal Storehouse (玻璃, Pha lê).				
Office seal of the Brocade and Satin Storehouse (錦秀, Cẩm tú).	Formerly the Brocade Storehouse (錦緞, Cẩm đoạn).				
Office seal of the Precious Antiques Storehouse (珍玩, Trân ngoạn). (Note: The term Trân ngoạn is also translated as the Precious Trinkets Storehouse.)	Formerly the Ceramics Storehouse (瓷器, Từ khí).				

==== Other imperial government agencies ====
Office or organisation	Inscription (chữ Quốc ngữ)	Inscription (chữ Hán)	Image of the seal	Print of the seal
Great seal of the Regent Office (輔政府, Phụ chính phủ).	Phụ chính phủ ấn	輔政府印		
Kiềm ấn of the Regent Office (輔政府, Phụ chính phủ).	Phụ chính	輔政		
Great seal of the Regent of the Nguyễn dynasty.	Phụ chính Thân thần quan phòng	輔政親臣關防		
Kiềm ấn of the Regent of the Nguyễn dynasty.	Phụ chính Thân thần	輔政親臣		
Great seal of the Prince Regent of the Nguyễn dynasty.	Lưu kinh chi ấn	留京之印		
Great seal of the Tam Pháp Ty (叄法司).	Tam Pháp Ty ấn	叄法司印		
Kiềm ấn of the Tam Pháp Ty (叄法司).	Tam Pháp Ty	叄法司		
Office seal of the Quốc tử giám (國子監).	Quốc tử giám quan phòng	國子監關防		
Office seal of the Metropolitan Examination Site (會試, Hội thi), Minh Mạng period.	Hội thi chi ấn	會試之印		
Office seal of the Metropolitan Examination Site (會試, Hội thi), Tự Đức period.	Hội thi chi ấn	會試之印		
Dấu kiềm ấn of the Metropolitan Examination Site (會試, Hội thi).	Văn hành công khí	文衡公器		
Office seal of the Directorate of Imperial Observatory (欽天監, Khâm thiên giám).	Khâm thiên giám ấn	欽天監印		
Office seal of the Civil Affairs Ministry & Personnel Ministry Imperial Records Chapter (吏戶章, Lại Hộ Chương).				
Office seal of the Rites Ministry & Military Ministry Imperial Records Chapter (禮兵章, Lễ Binh Chương).				
Office seal of the Justice Ministry & Works Ministry Imperial Records Chapter (刑工章, Hình Công Chương).				
Great seal of the Court of the Imperial Clan (宗人府, Tông Nhân phủ).	Tông Nhân phủ ấn	宗人府印		
Small seal of the Court of the Imperial Clan (宗人府, Tông Nhân phủ).	Tông Nhân	宗人		
Great seal of the Court of the Imperial Clan (尊人府, Tôn Nhân phủ), after the naming taboo. (Note: The Court of the Imperial Clan was renamed because of a naming taboo as the personal name of the Thiệu Trị Emperor was Nguyễn Phúc Miên Tông (阮福綿宗), in Classical Chinese it was originally called the Tông Nhân phủ (宗人府) but was renamed to the Tôn Nhân phủ (尊人府).)	Tôn Nhân phủ ấn	尊人府印		
Small seal of the Court of the Imperial Clan (尊人府, Tôn Nhân phủ), after the naming taboo.	Tôn Nhân	尊人		
Office seal of the School of the Imperial Clan (尊學所, Tôn học sở).				
Seal of the Công đồng office (Công đồng sử dụng) before 1835.	Công đồng chi ấn	公同之印		
Seal of the Công đồng office (Công đồng sử dụng) before 1835.	Đồng di hiệp cung	同寅協恭		
Seal of the Công đồng office (Công đồng sử dụng) after 1835.	Đình thần chi ấn	廷臣之印		
Great seal of the Quốc sử quán (國史館).	Quốc sử quán ấn	國史館印		
Small seal of the Quốc sử quán (國史館).	Sử quán	史館		
Office seal of the director of the Bureau of Interpreters (行人司, Hành nhơn ti).	Ngự tiền thông sự kiêm Đốc Hành nhân ty đồ ký	御前通事兼督行人司圖記		
Office seal of the director of the Bureau of Interpreters (行人司, Hành nhơn ti).	Kiêm đốc Hành nhân ty - DIRECTION DU BUREAU DES INTERPRÈTES	兼督行人司 - DIRECTION DU BUREAU DES INTERPRÈTES		
Great seal of the Office of Transmission (通政使司, Thông chính sứ ty).	Thông chính sứ ty chi ấn	通政使司之印		
Small seal of the Office of Transmission (通政使司, Thông chính sứ ty).	Thông chính	通政		
Office seal of the Imperial Archives (詹事府, Thiệm sự phủ).				
Office seal of the Imperial Military Service (武班職製, Võ bang chức chế).				
Office seal of the Imperial Arsenal (武庫, Vũ khố).	Vũ khố quan phòng	武庫關防		

=== Provincial administration ===
==== Tổng Trấn and Kinh lược sứ ====
Office or organisation	Inscription (chữ Quốc ngữ)	Inscription (chữ Hán)	Image of the seal	Print of the seal
Seal of the Minh Mạng period Kinh lược sứ.	Kinh lược sứ quan phòng	經略使關防		
Great seal of the Tổng Trấn of Gia Định thành.	Gia Định thành tổng trấn chi ấn	嘉定城總鎮之印		
Small seal of the Tổng Trấn of Gia Định thành.	Gia Định tín ký	嘉定信記		
Great seal of the Tổng Trấn of Bắc thành.	Bắc thành tổng trấn chi ấn	北城總鎮之印		
Small seal of the Tổng Trấn of Bắc thành.	Bắc thành	北城		
Great seal of the Viceroy of Tonkin (经略使北圻, Kinh lược sứ Bắc Kỳ).	Khâm sai đại thần quan phòng	欽差大臣關防		
Small seal of the Viceroy of Tonkin (经略使北圻, Kinh lược sứ Bắc Kỳ).	Khâm sai đại thần	欽差大臣		

==== Tổng đốc and Phủ doãn ====
Office or organisation	Inscription (chữ Quốc ngữ)	Inscription (chữ Hán)	Image of the seal	Print of the seal
Office seal of the Phủ doãn (府尹), the equivalent Tổng đốc for Thừa Thiên.				
Great seal of the Tổng đốc of Sơn Hưng Tuyên (Sơn Tây, Hưng Hóa, and Tuyên Quang), in Bắc Kỳ.	Sơn Tây Hưng Hóa Tuyên Quang Tổng đốc quan phòng	山西興化宣光總督關防		
Small seal of the Tổng đốc of Sơn Hưng Tuyên (Sơn Tây, Hưng Hóa, and Tuyên Quang), in Bắc Kỳ.	Sơn Hưng Tuyên Tổng đốc	山興宣總督		
Great seal of the Tổng đốc of Hà Ninh (Hanoi and Ninh Bình), in Bắc Kỳ. (Later known as the Tổng đốc of Hà An / Hà Yên.)	Hà Nội Ninh Bình Tổng đốc quan phòng	河內寧平總督關防		
Small seal of the Tổng đốc of Hà Ninh (Hanoi and Ninh Bình), in Bắc Kỳ. (Later known as the Tổng đốc of Hà An / Hà Yên.)	Hà Ninh Tổng đốc	河寧總督		
Great seal of the Tổng đốc of Hà Đông, in Bắc Kỳ.				
Small seal of the Tổng đốc of Hà Đông, in Bắc Kỳ.				
Great seal of the Tổng đốc of Ninh Thái (Bắc Ninh and Thái Nguyên), in Bắc Kỳ.	Bắc Ninh Thái Nguyên Tổng đốc quan phòng	北寧太原總督關防		
Small seal of the Tổng đốc of Ninh Thái (Bắc Ninh and Thái Nguyên), in Bắc Kỳ.	Ninh Thái Tổng đốc	寧太總督		
Great seal of the Tổng đốc of Hải An / Hải Yên (Hải Dương and Quảng Yên), in Bắc Kỳ.	Hải Dương Quảng Yên Tổng đốc quan phòng	海陽廣安總督關防		
Small seal of the Tổng đốc of Hải An / Hải Yên (Hải Dương and Quảng Yên), in Bắc Kỳ.	Hải An Tổng đốc / Hải Yên Tổng đốc	海安總督		
Great seal of the Tổng đốc of Định An / Định Yên (Nam Định and Hưng Yên), in Bắc Kỳ.	Nam Định Hưng Yên Tổng đốc quan phòng	南定興安總督關防		
Small seal of the Tổng đốc of Định An / Định Yên (Nam Định and Hưng Yên), in Bắc Kỳ.	Định An Tổng đốc / Định Yên Tổng đốc	定安總督		
Great seal of the Tổng đốc of Lạng Bình (Lạng Sơn and Cao Bằng), in Bắc Kỳ.	Lạng Sơn Cao Bằng Tổng đốc quan phòng	諒山高平總督關防		
Small seal of the Tổng đốc of Lạng Bình (Lạng Sơn and Cao Bằng), in Bắc Kỳ.	Lạng Bình Tổng đốc	諒平總督		
Great seal of the Tổng đốc of Thanh Hóa, in Trung Kỳ. (Note: Thanh Hóa was such a large and populous province that it had its own Tổng đốc (總督).)	Thanh Hóa Tổng đốc quan phòng	清化總督關防		
Small seal of the Tổng đốc of Thanh Hóa, in Trung Kỳ.	Thanh Hóa Tổng đốc	清化總督		
Great seal of the Tổng đốc of An Tĩnh (Nghệ An and Hà Tĩnh), in Trung Kỳ.	Nghệ An Hà Tĩnh Tổng đốc quan phòng	乂安河靜總督關防		
Small seal of the Tổng đốc of An Tĩnh (Nghệ An and Hà Tĩnh), in Trung Kỳ.	An Tĩnh Tổng đốc	安靜總督		
Great seal of the Tổng đốc of Bình Trị (Quảng Bình and Quảng Trị), in Trung Kỳ.	Quảng Trị Quảng Bình Tổng đốc quan phòng	廣治廣平總督關防		
Small seal of the Tổng đốc of Bình Trị (Quảng Bình and Quảng Trị), in Trung Kỳ.	Bình Trị Tổng đốc	平治總督		
Great seal of the Tổng đốc of Nam Nghĩa (Quảng Nam and Quảng Ngãi), in Trung Kỳ.	Quảng Nam Quảng Ngãi Tổng đốc quan phòng	廣南廣義總督關防		
Small seal of the Tổng đốc of Nam Nghĩa (Quảng Nam and Quảng Ngãi), in Trung Kỳ.	Nam Nghĩa Tổng đốc	南義總督		
Great seal of the Tổng đốc of Bình Phú (Phú Yên and Bình Định), in Trung Kỳ.	Phú Yên Bình Định Tổng đốc quan phòng	富安平定總督關防		
Small seal of the Tổng đốc of Bình Phú (Phú Yên and Bình Định), in Trung Kỳ.	Bình Phú Tổng đốc	平富總督		
Great seal of the Tổng đốc of Thuận Khánh (Bình Thuận and Khánh Hòa), in Trung Kỳ.	Bình Thuận Khánh Hòa Tổng đốc quan phòng	平順慶和總督關防		
Small seal of the Tổng đốc of Thuận Khánh (Bình Thuận and Khánh Hòa), in Trung Kỳ.	Thuận Khánh Tổng đốc	順慶總督		
Great seal of the Tổng đốc of An Hà (An Giang and Hà Tiên), in Nam Kỳ.	An Giang Hà Tiên Tổng đốc quan phòng	安江河仙總督關防		
Small seal of the Tổng đốc of An Hà (An Giang and Hà Tiên), in Nam Kỳ.	An Hà Tổng đốc	安河總督		
Great seal of the Tổng đốc of Long Tường (Vĩnh Long and Định Tường), in Nam Kỳ.	Vĩnh Long Định Tường Tổng đốc quan phòng	永隆定祥總督關防		
Small seal of the Tổng đốc of Long Tường (Vĩnh Long and Định Tường), in Nam Kỳ.	Long Tường Tổng đốc	隆祥總督		
Great seal of the Tổng đốc of Định Biên (Gia Định and Biên Hòa), in Nam Kỳ.	Gia Định Biên Hòa Tổng đốc quan phòng	嘉定邊和總督關防		
Small seal of the Tổng đốc of Định Biên (Gia Định and Biên Hòa), in Nam Kỳ.	Định Biên Tổng đốc	定邊總督		

==== Tuần phủ ====
Office or organisation	Inscription (chữ Quốc ngữ)	Inscription (chữ Hán)	Image of the seal	Print of the seal
Great seal of the Tuần phủ of Lạng Bình (Lạng Sơn and Cao Bằng).	Lạng Sơn Cao Bằng Tuần phủ quan phòng	諒山高平巡撫關防		
Variant great seal of the Tuần phủ of Lạng Bình (Lạng Sơn and Cao Bằng).	Lạng Bình Tuần phủ quan phòng	諒平巡撫關防		
Kiềm ấn of the Tuần phủ of Lạng Bình (Lạng Sơn and Cao Bằng).	Lạng Bình Tuần phủ	諒平巡撫		
Great seal of the Tuần phủ of the Ninh Bình province.	Ninh Bình Tuần phủ quan phòng	寧平巡撫關防		
Kiềm ấn of the Tuần phủ of the Ninh Bình province.	Ninh Bình Tuần phủ	寧平巡撫		
Office seal of the Tuần phủ of the Thanh Hóa province.	Thanh Hóa Tuần phủ quan phòng	清化巡撫關防		
Great seal of the Tuần phủ of the Quảng Trị and Quảng Bình provinces.	Quảng Trị Quảng Bình Tuần phủ quan phòng	廣治廣平巡撫關防		
Kiềm ấn of the Tuần phủ of the Quảng Trị and Quảng Bình provinces.	Trị Bình Tuần phủ	治平巡撫		
Great seal of the Tuần phủ of the Quảng Nam and Quảng Ngãi provinces.	Quảng Nam Quảng Ngãi Tuần phủ quan phòng	廣南廣義巡撫關防		
Kiềm ấn of the Tuần phủ of the Quảng Nam and Quảng Ngãi provinces.	Nam Nghĩa Tuần phủ	南義巡撫		

==== Protectorates, special regions, and dependencies ====
Office or organisation	Inscription (chữ Quốc ngữ)	Inscription (chữ Hán)	Image of the seal	Print of the seal
Seal of the Protector-General of Trấn Tây Thành (Cambodia under Nguyễn dynasty domination).	Trấn Tây tướng quân chi ấn	鎭西將軍之印		
Dấu kiềm ấn of the Protector-General of Trấn Tây Thành (Cambodia under Nguyễn dynasty domination).	Trấn Tây	鎭西		
Office seal of the Grand Chancellor of the Taï Principality (a special administrative region).				

==== French Residents ====
This is a list of seals of the Vietnamese-style seals used on Classical Chinese language documents of the French Residents appointed to oversee the provincial administrations of the provinces of the French protectorates of Annam and Tonkin alongside indigenous mandarins, it does not include the French-style seals used on French language documents.

Office or organisation	Inscription (chữ Quốc ngữ)	Inscription (chữ Hán)	Image of the seal	Print of the seal
Great seal of the French Resident of the Bình Thuận province (平順公使, Bình Thuận Công sứ).	Bình Thuận Công sứ Quan phòng	平順公使關防		
Kiềm ấn of the French Resident of the Bình Thuận province (平順公使, Bình Thuận Công sứ).	Bình Thuận Công sứ	平順公使		

==== Provincial administration commissioners ====
Office or organisation	Inscription (chữ Quốc ngữ)	Inscription (chữ Hán)	Image of the seal	Print of the seal
Great seal of the Administration Commissioner (Bố chính sứ) of the Hà Nội province (河內布政使, Hà Nội Bố chính sứ).	Hà Nội Bố chánh sứ ty chi ấn	河內布政使司之印		
Kiềm ấn of the Administration Commissioner (Bố chính sứ) of the Hà Nội province (河內布政使, Hà Nội Bố chính sứ).	Hà Nội Bố chánh	河內布政		
Great seal of the Administration Commissioner (Bố chính sứ) of the Hưng Yên province (興安布政使, Hưng Yên Bố chính sứ).	Hưng Yên Bố chánh sứ ty chi ấn	興安布政使司之印		
Kiềm ấn of the Administration Commissioner (Bố chính sứ) of the Hưng Yên province (興安布政使, Hưng Yên Bố chính sứ).	Hưng Yên Bố chánh	興安布政		
Great seal of the Administration Commissioner (Bố chính sứ) of the Bắc Ninh province (北寧布政使, Bắc Ninh Bố chính sứ).	Bắc Ninh Bố chánh sứ ty chi ấn	北寧布政使司之印		
Kiềm ấn of the Administration Commissioner (Bố chính sứ) of the Bắc Ninh province (北寧布政使, Bắc Ninh Bố chính sứ).	Bắc Ninh Bố chánh	北寧布政		
Great seal of the Administration Commissioner (Bố chính sứ) of the Nam Định province (南定布政使, Nam Định Bố chính sứ).	Nam Định Bố chánh sứ ty chi ấn	南定布政使司之印		
Kiềm ấn of the Administration Commissioner (Bố chính sứ) of the Nam Định province (南定布政使, Nam Định Bố chính sứ).	Nam Định Bố chánh	南定布政		
Great seal of the Administration Commissioner (Bố chính sứ) of the Hải Dương province (海陽布政使, Hải Dương Bố chính sứ).	Hải Dương Bố chánh sứ ty chi ấn	海陽布政使司之印		
Kiềm ấn of the Administration Commissioner (Bố chính sứ) of the Hải Dương province (海陽布政使, Hải Dương Bố chính sứ).	Hải Dương Bố chánh	海陽布政		
Great seal of the Administration Commissioner (Bố chính sứ) of the Sơn Tây province (山西布政使, Sơn Tây Bố chính sứ).	Sơn Tây Bố chánh sứ ty chi ấn	山西布政使司之印		
Kiềm ấn of the Administration Commissioner (Bố chính sứ) of the Sơn Tây province (山西布政使, Sơn Tây Bố chính sứ).	Sơn Tây Bố chánh	山西布政		
Great seal of the Administration Commissioner (Bố chính sứ) of the Ninh Bình province (寧平布政使, Ninh Bình Bố chính sứ).	Ninh Bình Bố chánh sứ ty chi ấn	寧平布政使司之印		
Kiềm ấn of the Administration Commissioner (Bố chính sứ) of the Ninh Bình province (寧平布政使, Ninh Bình Bố chính sứ).	Ninh Bình Bố chánh	寧平布政		
Great seal of the Administration Commissioner (Bố chính sứ) of the Thái Nguyên province (太原布政使, Thái Nguyên Bố chính sứ).	Thái Nguyên Bố chánh sứ ty chi ấn	太原布政使司之印		
Kiềm ấn of the Administration Commissioner (Bố chính sứ) of the Thái Nguyên province (太原布政使, Thái Nguyên Bố chính sứ).	Thái Nguyên Bố chánh	太原布政		
Great seal of the Administration Commissioner (Bố chính sứ) of the Lạng Sơn province (諒山布政使, Lạng Sơn Bố chính sứ).	Lạng Sơn Bố chánh sứ ty chi ấn	諒山布政使司之印		
Kiềm ấn of the Administration Commissioner (Bố chính sứ) of the Lạng Sơn province (諒山布政使, Lạng Sơn Bố chính sứ).	Lạng Sơn Bố chánh	諒山布政		
Great seal of the Administration Commissioner (Bố chính sứ) of the Tuyên Quang province (宣光布政使, Tuyên Quang Bố chính sứ).	Tuyên Quang Bố chánh sứ ty chi ấn	宣光布政使司之印		
Kiềm ấn of the Administration Commissioner (Bố chính sứ) of the Tuyên Quang province (宣光布政使, Tuyên Quang Bố chính sứ).	Tuyên Quang Bố chánh	宣光布政		
Great seal of the Administration Commissioner (Bố chính sứ) of the Hưng Hóa province (興化布政使, Hưng Hóa Bố chính sứ).	Hưng Hóa Bố chánh sứ ty chi ấn	興化布政使司之印		
Kiềm ấn of the Administration Commissioner (Bố chính sứ) of the Hưng Hóa province (興化布政使, Hưng Hóa Bố chính sứ).	Hưng Hóa Bố chánh	興化布政		
Great seal of the Administration Commissioner (Bố chính sứ) of the Cao Bằng province (高平布政使, Cao Bằng Bố chính sứ).	Cao Bằng Bố chánh sứ ty chi ấn	高平布政使司之印		
Kiềm ấn of the Administration Commissioner (Bố chính sứ) of the Cao Bằng province (高平布政使, Cao Bằng Bố chính sứ).	Cao Bằng Bố chánh	高平布政		
Great seal of the Administration Commissioner (Bố chính sứ) of the Quảng Yên province (廣安布政使, Quảng Yên Bố chính sứ).	Quảng Yên Bố chánh sứ ty chi ấn	廣安布政使司之印		
Kiềm ấn of the Administration Commissioner (Bố chính sứ) of the Quảng Yên province (廣安布政使, Quảng Yên Bố chính sứ).	Quảng Yên Bố chánh	廣安布政		
Great seal of the Administration Commissioner (Bố chính sứ) of the Thanh Hóa province (清化布政使, Thanh Hóa Bố chính sứ).	Thanh Hóa Bố chánh sứ ty chi ấn	清化布政使司之印		
Kiềm ấn of the Administration Commissioner (Bố chính sứ) of the Thanh Hóa province (清化布政使, Thanh Hóa Bố chính sứ).	Thanh Hóa Bố chánh	清化布政		
Great seal of the Administration Commissioner (Bố chính sứ) of the Nghệ An province (乂安布政使, Nghệ An Bố chính sứ).	Nghệ An Bố chánh sứ ty chi ấn	乂安布政使司之印		
Kiềm ấn of the Administration Commissioner (Bố chính sứ) of the Nghệ An province (乂安布政使, Nghệ An Bố chính sứ).	Nghệ An Bố chánh	乂安布政		
Great seal of the Administration Commissioner (Bố chính sứ) of the Hà Tĩnh province (河靜布政使, Hà Tĩnh Bố chính sứ).	Hà Tĩnh Bố chánh sứ ty chi ấn	河靜布政使司之印		
Kiềm ấn of the Administration Commissioner (Bố chính sứ) of the Hà Tĩnh province (河靜布政使, Hà Tĩnh Bố chính sứ).	Hà Tĩnh Bố chánh	河靜布政		
Great seal of the Administration Commissioner (Bố chính sứ) of the Quảng Bình province (廣平布政使, Quảng Bình Bố chính sứ).	Quảng Bình Bố chánh sứ ty chi ấn	廣平布政使司之印		
Kiềm ấn of the Administration Commissioner (Bố chính sứ) of the Quảng Bình province (廣平布政使, Quảng Bình Bố chính sứ).	Quảng Bình Bố chánh	廣平布政		
Great seal of the Administration Commissioner (Bố chính sứ) of the Quảng Trị province (廣治布政使, Quảng Trị Bố chính sứ).	Quảng Trị Bố chánh sứ ty chi ấn	廣治布政使司之印		
Kiềm ấn of the Administration Commissioner (Bố chính sứ) of the Quảng Trị province (廣治布政使, Quảng Trị Bố chính sứ).	Quảng Trị Bố chánh	廣治布政		
Great seal of the Administration Commissioner (Bố chính sứ) of the Quảng Nam province (廣南布政使, Quảng Nam Bố chính sứ).	Quảng Nam Bố chánh sứ ty chi ấn	廣南布政使司之印		
Kiềm ấn of the Administration Commissioner (Bố chính sứ) of the Quảng Nam province (廣南布政使, Quảng Nam Bố chính sứ).	Quảng Nam Bố chánh	廣南布政		
Great seal of the Administration Commissioner (Bố chính sứ) of the Quảng Ngãi province (廣義布政使, Quảng Ngãi Bố chính sứ).	Quảng Ngãi Bố chánh sứ ty chi ấn	廣義布政使司之印		
Kiềm ấn of the Administration Commissioner (Bố chính sứ) of the Quảng Ngãi province (廣義布政使, Quảng Ngãi Bố chính sứ).	Quảng Ngãi Bố chánh	廣義布政		
Great seal of the Administration Commissioner (Bố chính sứ) of the Bình Định province (平定布政使, Bình Định Bố chính sứ).	Bình Định Bố chánh sứ ty chi ấn	平定布政使司之印		
Kiềm ấn of the Administration Commissioner (Bố chính sứ) of the Bình Định province (平定布政使, Bình Định Bố chính sứ).	Bình Định Bố chánh	平定布政		
Great seal of the Administration Commissioner (Bố chính sứ) of the Bình Thuận province (平順布政使, Bình Thuận Bố chính sứ).	Bình Thuận Bố chánh sứ ty chi ấn	平順布政使司之印		
Kiềm ấn of the Administration Commissioner (Bố chính sứ) of the Bình Thuận province (平順布政使, Bình Thuận Bố chính sứ).	Bình Thuận Bố chánh	平順布政		
Great seal of the Administration Commissioner (Bố chính sứ) of the Khánh Hòa province (慶和布政使, Khánh Hòa Bố chính sứ).	Khánh Hòa Bố chánh sứ ty chi ấn	慶和布政使司之印		
Kiềm ấn of the Administration Commissioner (Bố chính sứ) of the Khánh Hòa province (慶和布政使, Khánh Hòa Bố chính sứ).	Khánh Hòa Bố chánh	慶和布政		
Great seal of the Administration Commissioner (Bố chính sứ) of the Phú Yên province (富安布政使, Phú Yên Bố chính sứ).	Phú Yên Bố chánh sứ ty chi ấn	富安布政使司之印		
Kiềm ấn of the Administration Commissioner (Bố chính sứ) of the Phú Yên province (富安布政使, Phú Yên Bố chính sứ).	Phú Yên Bố chánh	富安布政		
Great seal of the Administration Commissioner (Bố chính sứ) of the Biên Hòa province (邊和布政使, Biên Hòa Bố chính sứ).	Biên Hòa Bố chánh sứ ty chi ấn	邊和布政使司之印		
Kiềm ấn of the Administration Commissioner (Bố chính sứ) of the Biên Hòa province (邊和布政使, Biên Hòa Bố chính sứ).	Biên Hòa Bố chánh	邊和布政		
Great seal of the Administration Commissioner (Bố chính sứ) of the Định Tường province (定祥布政使, Định Tường Bố chính sứ).	Định Tường Bố chánh sứ ty chi ấn	定祥布政使司之印		
Kiềm ấn of the Administration Commissioner (Bố chính sứ) of the Định Tường province (定祥布政使, Định Tường Bố chính sứ).	Định Tường Bố chánh	定祥布政		
Great seal of the Administration Commissioner (Bố chính sứ) of the Gia Định province (嘉定布政使, Gia Định Bố chính sứ).	Gia Định Bố chánh sứ ty chi ấn	嘉定布政使司之印		
Kiềm ấn of the Administration Commissioner (Bố chính sứ) of the Gia Định province (嘉定布政使, Gia Định Bố chính sứ).	Gia Định Bố chánh	嘉定布政		
Great seal of the Administration Commissioner (Bố chính sứ) of the Hà Tiên province (河僊布政使, Hà Tiên Bố chính sứ).	Hà Tiên Bố chánh sứ ty chi ấn	河僊布政使司之印		
Kiềm ấn of the Administration Commissioner (Bố chính sứ) of the Hà Tiên province (河僊布政使, Hà Tiên Bố chính sứ).	Hà Tiên Bố chánh	河僊布政		
Great seal of the Administration Commissioner (Bố chính sứ) of the An Giang province (安江布政使, An Giang Bố chính sứ).	An Giang Bố chánh sứ ty chi ấn	安江布政使司之印		
Kiềm ấn of the Administration Commissioner (Bố chính sứ) of the An Giang province (安江布政使, An Giang Bố chính sứ).	An Giang Bố chánh	安江布政		
Great seal of the Administration Commissioner (Bố chính sứ) of the Vĩnh Long province (永隆布政使, Vĩnh Long Bố chính sứ).	Vĩnh Long Bố chánh sứ ty chi ấn	永隆布政使司之印		
Kiềm ấn of the Administration Commissioner (Bố chính sứ) of the Vĩnh Long province (永隆布政使, Vĩnh Long Bố chính sứ).	Vĩnh Long Bố chánh	永隆布政		

=== Surveillance seals ===
==== Seals of the Lục khoa of the Đô sát viện ====
Office or organisation	Inscription (chữ Quốc ngữ)	Inscription (chữ Hán)	Image of the seal	Print of the seal
Seal of the Lại khoa, the procurator (kiểm sát) of the Ministry of Personnel and the Hanlin Academy.	Lại khoa cấp sự trung chi ấn	吏科給事中之印		
Seal of the Hộ khoa, the procurator (kiểm sát) of the Ministry of Revenue, Imperial Household Department, the Tào chính ty, and the Thương chính ty.	Hộ khoa cấp sự trung chi ấn	戶科給事中之印		
Seal of the Lễ khoa, the procurator (kiểm sát) of the Ministry of Rites, the Court of Imperial Sacrifices, the Court of Imperial Entertainments, Quốc tử giám, and the Directorate of Imperial Observatory.	Lễ khoa cấp sự trung chi ấn	禮科給事中之印		
Seal of the Binh khoa, the procurator (kiểm sát) of the Ministry of War, the Court of the Imperial Stud, the Kinh thành đề đốc, and the Imperial Arsenal.	Binh khoa cấp sự trung chi ấn	兵科給事中之印		
Seal of the Hình khoa, the procurator (kiểm sát) of the Ministry of Justice and the Court of Judicial Review.	Hình khoa cấp sự trung chi ấn	刑科給事中之印		
Seal of the Công khoa, the procurator (kiểm sát) of the Ministry of Public Works and the Mộc thương.	Công khoa cấp sự trung chi ấn	工科給事中之印		

==== Seals of the Thập lục đạo of the Đô sát viện ====
Office or organisation	Inscription (chữ Quốc ngữ)	Inscription (chữ Hán)	Image of the seal	Print of the seal
Seal of the Đạo Kinh kỳ, the surveillant (giám sát) of kinh đô Thừa Thiên (Huế).	Kinh kỳ đạo ngự sử chi ấn	京畿道御史之印		
Seal of the Đạo Sơn Hưng Tuyên, the surveillant (giám sát) of the provinces of Sơn Tây, Hưng Hóa, and Tuyên Quang.	Sơn Hưng Tuyên đạo ngự sử chi ấn	山興宣道御史之印		
Seal of the Đạo Lạng Bình, the surveillant (giám sát) of the provinces of Lạng Sơn and Cao Bằng.	Lạng Bình đạo ngự sử chi ấn	諒平道御史之印		
Seal of the Đạo Ninh Thái, the surveillant (giám sát) of the provinces of Bắc Ninh and Thái Nguyên.	Ninh Thái đạo ngự sử chi ấn	寧太道御史之印		
Seal of the Đạo Hải An, the surveillant (giám sát) of the provinces of Hải Dương and Quảng Yên.	Hải An đạo ngự sử chi ấn	海安道御史之印		
Seal of the Đạo Định Yên, the surveillant (giám sát) of the provinces of Nam Định and Hưng Yên.	Định Yên đạo ngự sử chi ấn	定安道御史之印		
Seal of the Đạo Hà Ninh, the surveillant (giám sát) of the provinces of Hà Nội and Ninh Bình.	Hà Ninh đạo ngự sử chi ấn	河寧道御史之印		
Seal of the Đạo Thanh Hóa, the surveillant (giám sát) of the province of Thanh Hóa.	Thanh Hóa đạo ngự sử chi ấn	清化道御史之印		
Seal of the Đạo An Tĩnh, the surveillant (giám sát) of the provinces of Nghệ An and Hà Tĩnh.	An Tĩnh đạo ngự sử chi ấn	安靜道御史之印		
Seal of the Đạo Bình Trị, the surveillant (giám sát) of the provinces of Quảng Bình and Quảng Trị.	Bình Trị đạo ngự sử chi ấn	平治道御史之印		
Seal of the Đạo Nam Ngãi, the surveillant (giám sát) of the provinces of Quảng Nam and Quảng Ngãi.	Nam Ngãi đạo ngự sử chi ấn	南義道御史之印		
Seal of the Đạo Bình Phú, the surveillant (giám sát) of the provinces of Bình Định and Phú Yên.	Bình Phú đạo ngự sử chi ấn	平富道御史之印		
Seal of the Đạo Thuận Khánh, the surveillant (giám sát) of the provinces of Bình Thuận and Khánh Hòa.	Thuận Khánh đạo ngự sử chi ấn	順慶道御史之印		
Seal of the Đạo Định Biên, the surveillant (giám sát) of the provinces of Gia Định and Biên Hòa.	Định Biên đạo ngự sử chi ấn	定邊道御史之印		
Seal of the Đạo Long Tường, the surveillant (giám sát) of the provinces of Vĩnh Long and Định Tường.	Long Tường đạo ngự sử chi ấn	隆祥道御史之印		
Seal of the Đạo An Hà, the surveillant (giám sát) of the provinces of An Giang and Hà Tiên.	An Hà đạo ngự sử chi ấn	安河道御史之印		

==== Provincial surveillance commissioners ====
Office or organisation	Inscription (chữ Quốc ngữ)	Inscription (chữ Hán)	Image of the seal	Print of the seal
Great seal of the Surveillance Commissioner (Án sát sứ) of the Hà Nội province (河內按察使, Hà Nội Án sát sứ).	Hà Nội Án sát sứ ty chi ấn	河內按察使司之印		
Kiềm ấn of the Surveillance Commissioner (Án sát sứ) of the Hà Nội province (河內按察使, Hà Nội Án sát sứ).	Hà Nội Án sát	河內按察		
Great seal of the Surveillance Commissioner (Án sát sứ) of the Hưng Yên province (興安按察使, Hưng Yên Án sát sứ).	Hưng Yên Án sát sứ ty chi ấn	興安按察使司之印		
Kiềm ấn of the Surveillance Commissioner (Án sát sứ) of the Hưng Yên province (興安按察使, Hưng Yên Án sát sứ).	Hưng Yên Án sát	興安按察		
Great seal of the Surveillance Commissioner (Án sát sứ) of the Bắc Ninh province (北寧按察使, Bắc Ninh Án sát sứ).	Bắc Ninh Án sát sứ ty chi ấn	北寧按察使司之印		
Kiềm ấn of the Surveillance Commissioner (Án sát sứ) of the Bắc Ninh province (北寧按察使, Bắc Ninh Án sát sứ).	Bắc Ninh Án sát	北寧按察		
Great seal of the Surveillance Commissioner (Án sát sứ) of the Nam Định province (南定按察使, Nam Định Án sát sứ).	Nam Định Án sát sứ ty chi ấn	南定按察使司之印		
Kiềm ấn of the Surveillance Commissioner (Án sát sứ) of the Nam Định province (南定按察使, Nam Định Án sát sứ).	Nam Định Án sát	南定按察		
Great seal of the Surveillance Commissioner (Án sát sứ) of the Hải Dương province (海陽按察使, Hải Dương Án sát sứ).	Hải Dương Án sát sứ ty chi ấn	海陽按察使司之印		
Kiềm ấn of the Surveillance Commissioner (Án sát sứ) of the Hải Dương province (海陽按察使, Hải Dương Án sát sứ).	Hải Dương Án sát	海陽按察		
Great seal of the Surveillance Commissioner (Án sát sứ) of the Sơn Tây province (山西按察使, Sơn Tây Án sát sứ).	Sơn Tây Án sát sứ ty chi ấn	山西按察使司之印		
Kiềm ấn of the Surveillance Commissioner (Án sát sứ) of the Sơn Tây province (山西按察使, Sơn Tây Án sát sứ).	Sơn Tây Án sát	山西按察		
Great seal of the Surveillance Commissioner (Án sát sứ) of the Ninh Bình province (寧平按察使, Ninh Bình Án sát sứ).	Ninh Bình Án sát sứ ty chi ấn	寧平按察使司之印		
Kiềm ấn of the Surveillance Commissioner (Án sát sứ) of the Ninh Bình province (寧平按察使, Ninh Bình Án sát sứ).	Ninh Bình Án sát	寧平按察		
Great seal of the Surveillance Commissioner (Án sát sứ) of the Thái Nguyên province (太原按察使, Thái Nguyên Án sát sứ).	Thái Nguyên Án sát sứ ty chi ấn	太原按察使司之印		
Kiềm ấn of the Surveillance Commissioner (Án sát sứ) of the Thái Nguyên province (太原按察使, Thái Nguyên Án sát sứ).	Thái Nguyên Án sát	太原按察		
Great seal of the Surveillance Commissioner (Án sát sứ) of the Lạng Sơn province (諒山按察使, Lạng Sơn Án sát sứ).	Lạng Sơn Án sát sứ ty chi ấn	諒山按察使司之印		
Kiềm ấn of the Surveillance Commissioner (Án sát sứ) of the Lạng Sơn province (諒山按察使, Lạng Sơn Án sát sứ).	Lạng Sơn Án sát	諒山按察		
Great seal of the Surveillance Commissioner (Án sát sứ) of the Tuyên Quang province (宣光按察使, Tuyên Quang Án sát sứ).	Tuyên Quang Án sát sứ ty chi ấn	宣光按察使司之印		
Kiềm ấn of the Surveillance Commissioner (Án sát sứ) of the Tuyên Quang province (宣光按察使, Tuyên Quang Án sát sứ).	Tuyên Quang Án sát	宣光按察		
Great seal of the Surveillance Commissioner (Án sát sứ) of the Hưng Hóa province (興化按察使, Hưng Hóa Án sát sứ).	Hưng Hóa Án sát sứ ty chi ấn	興化按察使司之印		
Kiềm ấn of the Surveillance Commissioner (Án sát sứ) of the Hưng Hóa province (興化按察使, Hưng Hóa Án sát sứ).	Hưng Hóa Án sát	興化按察		
Great seal of the Surveillance Commissioner (Án sát sứ) of the Cao Bằng province (高平按察使, Cao Bằng Án sát sứ).	Cao Bằng Án sát sứ ty chi ấn	高平按察使司之印		
Kiềm ấn of the Surveillance Commissioner (Án sát sứ) of the Cao Bằng province (高平按察使, Cao Bằng Án sát sứ).	Cao Bằng Án sát	高平按察		
Great seal of the Surveillance Commissioner (Án sát sứ) of the Quảng Yên province (廣安按察使, Quảng Yên Án sát sứ).	Quảng Yên Án sát sứ ty chi ấn	廣安按察使司之印		
Kiềm ấn of the Surveillance Commissioner (Án sát sứ) of the Quảng Yên province (廣安按察使, Quảng Yên Án sát sứ).	Quảng Yên Án sát	廣安按察		
Great seal of the Surveillance Commissioner (Án sát sứ) of the Thanh Hóa province (清化按察使, Thanh Hóa Án sát sứ).	Thanh Hóa Án sát sứ ty chi ấn	清化按察使司之印		
Kiềm ấn of the Surveillance Commissioner (Án sát sứ) of the Thanh Hóa province (清化按察使, Thanh Hóa Án sát sứ).	Thanh Hóa Án sát	清化按察		
Great seal of the Surveillance Commissioner (Án sát sứ) of the Nghệ An province (乂安按察使, Nghệ An Án sát sứ).	Nghệ An Án sát sứ ty chi ấn	乂安按察使司之印		
Kiềm ấn of the Surveillance Commissioner (Án sát sứ) of the Nghệ An province (乂安按察使, Nghệ An Án sát sứ).	Nghệ An Án sát	乂安按察		
Great seal of the Surveillance Commissioner (Án sát sứ) of the Hà Tĩnh province (河靜按察使, Hà Tĩnh Án sát sứ).	Hà Tĩnh Án sát sứ ty chi ấn	河靜按察使司之印		
Kiềm ấn of the Surveillance Commissioner (Án sát sứ) of the Hà Tĩnh province (河靜按察使, Hà Tĩnh Án sát sứ).	Hà Tĩnh Án sát	河靜按察		
Great seal of the Surveillance Commissioner (Án sát sứ) of the Quảng Bình province (廣平按察使, Quảng Bình Án sát sứ).	Quảng Bình Án sát sứ ty chi ấn	廣平按察使司之印		
Kiềm ấn of the Surveillance Commissioner (Án sát sứ) of the Quảng Bình province (廣平按察使, Quảng Bình Án sát sứ).	Quảng Bình Án sát	廣平按察		
Great seal of the Surveillance Commissioner (Án sát sứ) of the Quảng Trị province (廣治按察使, Quảng Trị Án sát sứ).	Quảng Trị Án sát sứ ty chi ấn	廣治按察使司之印		
Kiềm ấn of the Surveillance Commissioner (Án sát sứ) of the Quảng Trị province (廣治按察使, Quảng Trị Án sát sứ).	Quảng Trị Án sát	廣治按察		
Great seal of the Surveillance Commissioner (Án sát sứ) of the Quảng Nam province (廣南按察使, Quảng Nam Án sát sứ).	Quảng Nam Án sát sứ ty chi ấn	廣南按察使司之印		
Kiềm ấn of the Surveillance Commissioner (Án sát sứ) of the Quảng Nam province (廣南按察使, Quảng Nam Án sát sứ).	Quảng Nam Án sát	廣南按察		
Great seal of the Surveillance Commissioner (Án sát sứ) of the Quảng Ngãi province (廣義按察使, Quảng Ngãi Án sát sứ).	Quảng Ngãi Án sát sứ ty chi ấn	廣義按察使司之印		
Kiềm ấn of the Surveillance Commissioner (Án sát sứ) of the Quảng Ngãi province (廣義按察使, Quảng Ngãi Án sát sứ).	Quảng Ngãi Án sát	廣義按察		
Great seal of the Surveillance Commissioner (Án sát sứ) of the Bình Định province (平定按察使, Bình Định Án sát sứ).	Bình Định Án sát sứ ty chi ấn	平定按察使司之印		
Kiềm ấn of the Surveillance Commissioner (Án sát sứ) of the Bình Định province (平定按察使, Bình Định Án sát sứ).	Bình Định Án sát	平定按察		
Great seal of the Surveillance Commissioner (Án sát sứ) of the Bình Thuận province (平順按察使, Bình Thuận Án sát sứ).	Bình Thuận Án sát sứ ty chi ấn	平順按察使司之印		
Kiềm ấn of the Surveillance Commissioner (Án sát sứ) of the Bình Thuận province (平順按察使, Bình Thuận Án sát sứ).	Bình Thuận Án sát	平順按察		
Great seal of the Surveillance Commissioner (Án sát sứ) of the Khánh Hòa province (慶和按察使, Khánh Hòa Án sát sứ).	Khánh Hòa Án sát sứ ty chi ấn	慶和按察使司之印		
Kiềm ấn of the Surveillance Commissioner (Án sát sứ) of the Khánh Hòa province (慶和按察使, Khánh Hòa Án sát sứ).	Khánh Hòa Án sát	慶和按察		
Great seal of the Surveillance Commissioner (Án sát sứ) of the Phú Yên province (富安按察使, Phú Yên Án sát sứ).	Phú Yên Án sát sứ ty chi ấn	富安按察使司之印		
Kiềm ấn of the Surveillance Commissioner (Án sát sứ) of the Phú Yên province (富安按察使, Phú Yên Án sát sứ).	Phú Yên Án sát	富安按察		
Great seal of the Surveillance Commissioner (Án sát sứ) of the Biên Hòa province (邊和按察使, Biên Hòa Án sát sứ).	Biên Hòa Án sát sứ ty chi ấn	邊和按察使司之印		
Kiềm ấn of the Surveillance Commissioner (Án sát sứ) of the Biên Hòa province (邊和按察使, Biên Hòa Án sát sứ).	Biên Hòa Án sát	邊和按察		
Great seal of the Surveillance Commissioner (Án sát sứ) of the Định Tường province (定祥按察使, Định Tường Án sát sứ).	Định Tường Án sát sứ ty chi ấn	定祥按察使司之印		
Kiềm ấn of the Surveillance Commissioner (Án sát sứ) of the Định Tường province (定祥按察使, Định Tường Án sát sứ).	Định Tường Án sát	定祥按察		
Great seal of the Surveillance Commissioner (Án sát sứ) of the Gia Định province (嘉定按察使, Gia Định Án sát sứ).	Gia Định Án sát sứ ty chi ấn	嘉定按察使司之印		
Kiềm ấn of the Surveillance Commissioner (Án sát sứ) of the Gia Định province (嘉定按察使, Gia Định Án sát sứ).	Gia Định Án sát	嘉定按察		
Great seal of the Surveillance Commissioner (Án sát sứ) of the Hà Tiên province (河僊按察使, Hà Tiên Án sát sứ).	Hà Tiên Án sát sứ ty chi ấn	河僊按察使司之印		
Kiềm ấn of the Surveillance Commissioner (Án sát sứ) of the Hà Tiên province (河僊按察使, Hà Tiên Án sát sứ).	Hà Tiên Án sát	河僊按察		
Great seal of the Surveillance Commissioner (Án sát sứ) of the An Giang province (安江按察使, An Giang Án sát sứ).	An Giang Án sát sứ ty chi ấn	安江按察使司之印		
Kiềm ấn of the Surveillance Commissioner (Án sát sứ) of the An Giang province (安江按察使, An Giang Án sát sứ).	An Giang Án sát	安江按察		
Great seal of the Surveillance Commissioner (Án sát sứ) of the Vĩnh Long province (永隆按察使, Vĩnh Long Án sát sứ).	Vĩnh Long Án sát sứ ty chi ấn	永隆按察使司之印		
Kiềm ấn of the Surveillance Commissioner (Án sát sứ) of the Vĩnh Long province (永隆按察使, Vĩnh Long Án sát sứ).	Vĩnh Long Án sát	永隆按察		

=== Military seals ===
==== Vệ binh ====
===== Imperial Guards =====
Rank and / or division	Inscription (chữ Quốc ngữ)	Inscription (chữ Hán)	Image of the seal	Print of the seal
Imperial Guards (處侍衛, Xứ Thị vệ).	Thị vệ xứ chi quan phòng	侍衛處之關防		
Kiềm ấn of the Imperial Guards (處侍衛, Xứ Thị vệ).	Thị vệ	侍衛		

==== Five Armies ====
Rank and / or division	Inscription (chữ Quốc ngữ)	Inscription (chữ Hán)	Image of the seal	Print of the seal
Seal of the Central Army (中軍, Trung quân)	Trung quân chi ấn	中軍之印		
Seal of the Front Army (前軍, Tiền quân) (Note: Used by General Nguyễn Văn Thành.)	Tiền Quân Chi Ấn	前軍之印		
Seal of the Left Army (左軍, Tả quân)	Tả quân chi ấn	左軍之印		
Seal of the Right Army (右軍, Hữu quân)	Hữu quân chi ấn	右軍之印		
Seal of the Rear Army (後軍, Hậu quân)	Hậu quân chi ấn	後軍之印		

===== Commander-Generals of the Five Armies =====
Rank and / or division	Inscription (chữ Quốc ngữ)	Inscription (chữ Hán)	Image of the seal	Print of the seal
Seal of the Commander-General of the Front Army (前軍都統府, Tiền quân Đô thống Phủ).	Tiền quân Đô thống Phủ quan phòng	前軍都統府關防		
Seal of the Commander-General of the Rear Army (后軍都統府, Hậu quân Đô thống Phủ).	Hậu quân Đô thống Phủ quan phòng	后軍都統府關防		
Seal of the Commander-General of the Left Army (左軍都統府, Tả quân Đô thống Phủ).	Tả quân Đô thống Phủ quan phòng	左軍都統府關防		
Seal of the Commander-General of the Right Army (右軍都統府, Hữu quân Đô thống Phủ).	Hữu quân Đô thống Phủ quan phòng	右軍都統府關防		
Seal of the Commander-General of the Central Army (中軍都統府, Trung quân Đô thống Phủ).	Trung quân Đô thống Phủ quan phòng	中軍都統府關防		

===== Marshals of the Five Armies =====
Rank and / or division	Inscription (chữ Quốc ngữ)	Inscription (chữ Hán)	Image of the seal	Print of the seal
Seal of the Marshal of the Central Army (中軍統制, Trung quân Thống chế).	Trung Thống chế quan phòng	中統制關防		
Seal of the Marshal of the Front Army (前軍統制, Tiền quân Thống chế).	Tiền Thống chế quan phòng	前統制關防		
Seal of the Marshal of the Left Army (左軍統制, Tả quân Thống chế).	Tả Thống chế quan phòng	左統制關防		
Seal of the Marshal of the Right Army (右軍統制, Hữu quân Thống chế).	Hữu Thống chế quan phòng	右統制關防		

==== Navy ====
Rank and / or division	Inscription (chữ Quốc ngữ)	Inscription (chữ Hán)	Image of the seal	Print of the seal
Seal of the Navy (水軍, Thủy Quân).	Thủy Quân chi ấn	水軍之印		

===== Thủy sư =====
Rank and / or division	Inscription (chữ Quốc ngữ)	Inscription (chữ Hán)	Image of the seal	Print of the seal
Great seal of the Capital Water Affairs Division (京畿水师, Kinh kỳ Thủy sư).	Kinh kỳ Thủy sư chi ấn	京畿水师之印		
Kiềm ấn of the Capital Water Affairs Division (京畿水师, Kinh kỳ Thủy sư).	Kinh kỳ Thủy sư	京畿水师		

==== Provincial military mandarins ====
===== Đề đốc =====
Rank and / or division	Inscription (chữ Quốc ngữ)	Inscription (chữ Hán)	Image of the seal	Print of the seal
Great seal of the Provincial Military Commander (Đề đốc) of the Kinh thành Huế, Thừa Thiên province (京城提督, Kinh thành Đề đốc).	Kinh thành Đề đốc quan phòng	京城提督關防		

===== Lãnh binh =====
Rank and / or division	Inscription (chữ Quốc ngữ)	Inscription (chữ Hán)	Image of the seal	Print of the seal
Great seal of the Provincial Military Lead (Lãnh binh) of the Hà Nội province (河內領兵, Hà Nội Lãnh binh).	Hà Nội Lãnh binh quan quan phòng	河內領兵官關防		
Kiềm ấn of the Provincial Military Lead (Lãnh binh) of the Hà Nội province (河內領兵, Hà Nội Lãnh binh).	Hà Nội Lãnh binh	河內領兵		
Great seal of the Provincial Military Lead (Lãnh binh) of the Hưng Yên province (興安領兵, Hưng Yên Lãnh binh).	Hưng Yên Lãnh binh quan quan phòng	興安領兵官關防		
Kiềm ấn of the Provincial Military Lead (Lãnh binh) of the Hưng Yên province (興安領兵, Hưng Yên Lãnh binh).	Hưng Yên Lãnh binh	興安領兵		
Great seal of the Provincial Military Lead (Lãnh binh) of the Bắc Ninh province (北寧領兵, Bắc Ninh Lãnh binh).	Bắc Ninh Lãnh binh quan quan phòng	北寧領兵官關防		
Kiềm ấn of the Provincial Military Lead (Lãnh binh) of the Bắc Ninh province (北寧領兵, Bắc Ninh Lãnh binh).	Bắc Ninh Lãnh binh	北寧領兵		
Great seal of the Provincial Military Lead (Lãnh binh) of the Nam Định province (南定領兵, Nam Định Lãnh binh).	Nam Định Lãnh binh quan quan phòng	南定領兵官關防		
Kiềm ấn of the Provincial Military Lead (Lãnh binh) of the Nam Định province (南定領兵, Nam Định Lãnh binh).	Nam Định Lãnh binh	南定領兵		
Great seal of the Provincial Military Lead (Lãnh binh) of the Hải Dương province (海陽領兵, Hải Dương Lãnh binh).	Hải Dương Lãnh binh quan quan phòng	海陽領兵官關防		
Kiềm ấn of the Provincial Military Lead (Lãnh binh) of the Hải Dương province (海陽領兵, Hải Dương Lãnh binh).	Hải Dương Lãnh binh	海陽領兵		
Great seal of the Provincial Military Lead (Lãnh binh) of the Sơn Tây province (山西領兵, Sơn Tây Lãnh binh).	Sơn Tây Lãnh binh quan quan phòng	山西領兵官關防		
Kiềm ấn of the Provincial Military Lead (Lãnh binh) of the Sơn Tây province (山西領兵, Sơn Tây Lãnh binh).	Sơn Tây Lãnh binh	山西領兵		
Great seal of the Provincial Military Lead (Lãnh binh) of the Ninh Bình province (寧平領兵, Ninh Bình Lãnh binh).	Ninh Bình Lãnh binh quan quan phòng	寧平領兵官關防		
Kiềm ấn of the Provincial Military Lead (Lãnh binh) of the Ninh Bình province (寧平領兵, Ninh Bình Lãnh binh).	Ninh Bình Lãnh binh	寧平領兵		
Great seal of the Provincial Military Lead (Lãnh binh) of the Thái Nguyên province (太原領兵, Thái Nguyên Lãnh binh).	Thái Nguyên Lãnh binh quan quan phòng	太原領兵官關防		
Kiềm ấn of the Provincial Military Lead (Lãnh binh) of the Thái Nguyên province (太原領兵, Thái Nguyên Lãnh binh).	Thái Nguyên Lãnh binh	太原領兵		
Great seal of the Provincial Military Lead (Lãnh binh) of the Lạng Sơn province (諒山領兵, Lạng Sơn Lãnh binh).	Lạng Sơn Lãnh binh quan quan phòng	諒山領兵官關防		
Kiềm ấn of the Provincial Military Lead (Lãnh binh) of the Lạng Sơn province (諒山領兵, Lạng Sơn Lãnh binh).	Lạng Sơn Lãnh binh	諒山領兵		
Great seal of the Provincial Military Lead (Lãnh binh) of the Tuyên Quang province (宣光領兵, Tuyên Quang Lãnh binh).	Tuyên Quang Lãnh binh quan quan phòng	宣光領兵官關防		
Kiềm ấn of the Provincial Military Lead (Lãnh binh) of the Tuyên Quang province (宣光領兵, Tuyên Quang Lãnh binh).	Tuyên Quang Lãnh binh	宣光領兵		
Great seal of the Provincial Military Lead (Lãnh binh) of the Hưng Hóa province (興化領兵, Hưng Hóa Lãnh binh).	Hưng Hóa Lãnh binh quan quan phòng	興化領兵官關防		
Kiềm ấn of the Provincial Military Lead (Lãnh binh) of the Hưng Hóa province (興化領兵, Hưng Hóa Lãnh binh).	Hưng Hóa Lãnh binh	興化領兵		
Great seal of the Provincial Military Lead (Lãnh binh) of the Cao Bằng province (高平領兵, Cao Bằng Lãnh binh).	Cao Bằng Lãnh binh quan quan phòng	高平領兵官關防		
Kiềm ấn of the Provincial Military Lead (Lãnh binh) of the Cao Bằng province (高平領兵, Cao Bằng Lãnh binh).	Cao Bằng Lãnh binh	高平領兵		
Great seal of the Provincial Military Lead (Lãnh binh) of the Quảng Yên province (廣安領兵, Quảng Yên Lãnh binh).	Quảng Yên Lãnh binh quan quan phòng	廣安領兵官關防		
Kiềm ấn of the Provincial Military Lead (Lãnh binh) of the Quảng Yên province (廣安領兵, Quảng Yên Lãnh binh).	Quảng Yên Lãnh binh	廣安領兵		
Great seal of the Provincial Military Lead (Lãnh binh) of the Thanh Hóa province (清化領兵, Thanh Hóa Lãnh binh).	Thanh Hóa Lãnh binh quan quan phòng	清化領兵官關防		
Kiềm ấn of the Provincial Military Lead (Lãnh binh) of the Thanh Hóa province (清化領兵, Thanh Hóa Lãnh binh).	Thanh Hóa Lãnh binh	清化領兵		
Great seal of the Provincial Military Lead (Lãnh binh) of the Nghệ An province (乂安領兵, Nghệ An Lãnh binh).	Nghệ An Lãnh binh quan quan phòng	乂安領兵官關防		
Kiềm ấn of the Provincial Military Lead (Lãnh binh) of the Nghệ An province (乂安領兵, Nghệ An Lãnh binh).	Nghệ An Lãnh binh	乂安領兵		
Great seal of the Provincial Military Lead (Lãnh binh) of the Hà Tĩnh province (河靜領兵, Hà Tĩnh Lãnh binh).	Hà Tĩnh Lãnh binh quan quan phòng	河靜領兵官關防		
Kiềm ấn of the Provincial Military Lead (Lãnh binh) of the Hà Tĩnh province (河靜領兵, Hà Tĩnh Lãnh binh).	Hà Tĩnh Lãnh binh	河靜領兵		
Great seal of the Provincial Military Lead (Lãnh binh) of the Quảng Bình province (廣平領兵, Quảng Bình Lãnh binh).	Quảng Bình Lãnh binh quan quan phòng	廣平領兵官關防		
Kiềm ấn of the Provincial Military Lead (Lãnh binh) of the Quảng Bình province (廣平領兵, Quảng Bình Lãnh binh).	Quảng Bình Lãnh binh	廣平領兵		
Great seal of the Provincial Military Lead (Lãnh binh) of the Quảng Trị province (廣治領兵, Quảng Trị Lãnh binh).	Quảng Trị Lãnh binh quan quan phòng	廣治領兵官關防		
Kiềm ấn of the Provincial Military Lead (Lãnh binh) of the Quảng Trị province (廣治領兵, Quảng Trị Lãnh binh).	Quảng Trị Lãnh binh	廣治領兵		
Great seal of the Provincial Military Lead (Lãnh binh) of the Quảng Nam province (廣南領兵, Quảng Nam Lãnh binh).	Quảng Nam Lãnh binh quan quan phòng	廣南領兵官關防		
Kiềm ấn of the Provincial Military Lead (Lãnh binh) of the Quảng Nam province (廣南領兵, Quảng Nam Lãnh binh).	Quảng Nam Lãnh binh	廣南領兵		
Great seal of the Provincial Military Lead (Lãnh binh) of the Quảng Ngãi province (廣義領兵, Quảng Ngãi Lãnh binh).	Quảng Ngãi Lãnh binh quan quan phòng	廣義領兵官關防		
Kiềm ấn of the Provincial Military Lead (Lãnh binh) of the Quảng Ngãi province (廣義領兵, Quảng Ngãi Lãnh binh).	Quảng Ngãi Lãnh binh	廣義領兵		
Great seal of the Provincial Military Lead (Lãnh binh) of the Bình Định province (平定領兵, Bình Định Lãnh binh).	Bình Định Lãnh binh quan quan phòng	平定領兵官關防		
Kiềm ấn of the Provincial Military Lead (Lãnh binh) of the Bình Định province (平定領兵, Bình Định Lãnh binh).	Bình Định Lãnh binh	平定領兵		
Great seal of the Provincial Military Lead (Lãnh binh) of the Bình Thuận province (平順領兵, Bình Thuận Lãnh binh).	Bình Thuận Lãnh binh quan quan phòng	平順領兵官關防		
Kiềm ấn of the Provincial Military Lead (Lãnh binh) of the Bình Thuận province (平順領兵, Bình Thuận Lãnh binh).	Bình Thuận Lãnh binh	平順領兵		
Great seal of the Provincial Military Lead (Lãnh binh) of the Khánh Hòa province (慶和領兵, Khánh Hòa Lãnh binh).	Khánh Hòa Lãnh binh quan quan phòng	慶和領兵官關防		
Kiềm ấn of the Provincial Military Lead (Lãnh binh) of the Khánh Hòa province (慶和領兵, Khánh Hòa Lãnh binh).	Khánh Hòa Lãnh binh	慶和領兵		
Great seal of the Provincial Military Lead (Lãnh binh) of the Phú Yên province (富安領兵, Phú Yên Lãnh binh).	Phú Yên Lãnh binh quan quan phòng	富安領兵官關防		
Kiềm ấn of the Provincial Military Lead (Lãnh binh) of the Phú Yên province (富安領兵, Phú Yên Lãnh binh).	Phú Yên Lãnh binh	富安領兵		
Great seal of the Provincial Military Lead (Lãnh binh) of the Biên Hòa province (邊和領兵, Biên Hòa Lãnh binh).	Biên Hòa Lãnh binh quan quan phòng	邊和領兵官關防		
Kiềm ấn of the Provincial Military Lead (Lãnh binh) of the Biên Hòa province (邊和領兵, Biên Hòa Lãnh binh).	Biên Hòa Lãnh binh	邊和領兵		
Great seal of the Provincial Military Lead (Lãnh binh) of the Định Tường province (定祥領兵, Định Tường Lãnh binh).	Định Tường Lãnh binh quan quan phòng	定祥領兵官關防		
Kiềm ấn of the Provincial Military Lead (Lãnh binh) of the Định Tường province (定祥領兵, Định Tường Lãnh binh).	Định Tường Lãnh binh	定祥領兵		
Great seal of the Provincial Military Lead (Lãnh binh) of the Gia Định province (嘉定領兵, Gia Định Lãnh binh).	Gia Định Lãnh binh quan quan phòng	嘉定領兵官關防		
Kiềm ấn of the Provincial Military Lead (Lãnh binh) of the Gia Định province (嘉定領兵, Gia Định Lãnh binh).	Gia Định Lãnh binh	嘉定領兵		
Great seal of the Provincial Military Lead (Lãnh binh) of the Hà Tiên province (河僊領兵, Hà Tiên Lãnh binh).	Hà Tiên Lãnh binh quan quan phòng	河僊領兵官關防		
Kiềm ấn of the Provincial Military Lead (Lãnh binh) of the Hà Tiên province (河僊領兵, Hà Tiên Lãnh binh).	Hà Tiên Lãnh binh	河僊領兵		
Great seal of the Provincial Military Lead (Lãnh binh) of the An Giang province (安江領兵, An Giang Lãnh binh).	An Giang Lãnh binh quan quan phòng	安江領兵官關防		
Kiềm ấn of the Provincial Military Lead (Lãnh binh) of the An Giang province (安江領兵, An Giang Lãnh binh).	An Giang Lãnh binh	安江領兵		
Great seal of the Provincial Military Lead (Lãnh binh) of the Vĩnh Long province (永隆領兵, Vĩnh Long Lãnh binh).	Vĩnh Long Lãnh binh quan quan phòng	永隆領兵官關防		
Kiềm ấn of the Provincial Military Lead (Lãnh binh) of the Vĩnh Long province (永隆領兵, Vĩnh Long Lãnh binh).	Vĩnh Long Lãnh binh	永隆領兵		

===== Phó lãnh binh =====
Rank and / or division	Inscription (chữ Quốc ngữ)	Inscription (chữ Hán)	Image of the seal	Print of the seal
Great seal of the Deputy Provincial Military Lead (Phó lãnh binh) of the Hà Nội province (河內副領兵, Hà Nội Phó lãnh binh).	Hà Nội Phó lãnh binh quan quan phòng	河內副領兵官關防		
Kiềm ấn of the Deputy Provincial Military Lead (Phó lãnh binh) of the Hà Nội province (河內副領兵, Hà Nội Phó lãnh binh).	Hà Nội Phó lãnh binh	河內副領兵		
Great seal of the Deputy Provincial Military Lead (Phó lãnh binh) of the Hưng Yên province (興安副領兵, Hưng Yên Phó lãnh binh).	Hưng Yên Phó lãnh binh quan quan phòng	興安副領兵官關防		
Kiềm ấn of the Deputy Provincial Military Lead (Phó lãnh binh) of the Hưng Yên province (興安副領兵, Hưng Yên Phó lãnh binh).	Hưng Yên Phó lãnh binh	興安副領兵		
Great seal of the Deputy Provincial Military Lead (Phó lãnh binh) of the Bắc Ninh province (北寧副領兵, Bắc Ninh Phó lãnh binh).	Bắc Ninh Phó lãnh binh quan quan phòng	北寧副領兵官關防		
Kiềm ấn of the Deputy Provincial Military Lead (Phó lãnh binh) of the Bắc Ninh province (北寧副領兵, Bắc Ninh Phó lãnh binh).	Bắc Ninh Phó lãnh binh	北寧副領兵		
Great seal of the Deputy Provincial Military Lead (Phó lãnh binh) of the Nam Định province (南定副領兵, Nam Định Phó lãnh binh).	Nam Định Phó lãnh binh quan quan phòng	南定副領兵官關防		
Kiềm ấn of the Deputy Provincial Military Lead (Phó lãnh binh) of the Nam Định province (南定副領兵, Nam Định Phó lãnh binh).	Nam Định Phó lãnh binh	南定副領兵		
Great seal of the Deputy Provincial Military Lead (Phó lãnh binh) of the Hải Dương province (海陽副領兵, Hải Dương Phó lãnh binh).	Hải Dương Phó lãnh binh quan quan phòng	海陽副領兵官關防		
Kiềm ấn of the Deputy Provincial Military Lead (Phó lãnh binh) of the Hải Dương province (海陽副領兵, Hải Dương Phó lãnh binh).	Hải Dương Phó lãnh binh	海陽副領兵		
Great seal of the Deputy Provincial Military Lead (Phó lãnh binh) of the Sơn Tây province (山西副領兵, Sơn Tây Phó lãnh binh).	Sơn Tây Phó lãnh binh quan quan phòng	山西副領兵官關防		
Kiềm ấn of the Deputy Provincial Military Lead (Phó lãnh binh) of the Sơn Tây province (山西副領兵, Sơn Tây Phó lãnh binh).	Sơn Tây Phó lãnh binh	山西副領兵		
Great seal of the Deputy Provincial Military Lead (Phó lãnh binh) of the Ninh Bình province (寧平副領兵, Ninh Bình Phó lãnh binh).	Ninh Bình Phó lãnh binh quan quan phòng	寧平副領兵官關防		
Kiềm ấn of the Deputy Provincial Military Lead (Phó lãnh binh) of the Ninh Bình province (寧平副領兵, Ninh Bình Phó lãnh binh).	Ninh Bình Phó lãnh binh	寧平副領兵		
Great seal of the Deputy Provincial Military Lead (Phó lãnh binh) of the Thái Nguyên province (太原副領兵, Thái Nguyên Phó lãnh binh).	Thái Nguyên Phó lãnh binh quan quan phòng	太原副領兵官關防		
Kiềm ấn of the Deputy Provincial Military Lead (Phó lãnh binh) of the Thái Nguyên province (太原副領兵, Thái Nguyên Phó lãnh binh).	Thái Nguyên Phó lãnh binh	太原副領兵		
Great seal of the Deputy Provincial Military Lead (Phó lãnh binh) of the Lạng Sơn province (諒山副領兵, Lạng Sơn Phó lãnh binh).	Lạng Sơn Phó lãnh binh quan quan phòng	諒山副領兵官關防		
Kiềm ấn of the Deputy Provincial Military Lead (Phó lãnh binh) of the Lạng Sơn province (諒山副領兵, Lạng Sơn Phó lãnh binh).	Lạng Sơn Phó lãnh binh	諒山副領兵		
Great seal of the Deputy Provincial Military Lead (Phó lãnh binh) of the Tuyên Quang province (宣光副領兵, Tuyên Quang Phó lãnh binh).	Tuyên Quang Phó lãnh binh quan quan phòng	宣光副領兵官關防		
Kiềm ấn of the Deputy Provincial Military Lead (Phó lãnh binh) of the Tuyên Quang province (宣光副領兵, Tuyên Quang Phó lãnh binh).	Tuyên Quang Phó lãnh binh	宣光副領兵		
Great seal of the Deputy Provincial Military Lead (Phó lãnh binh) of the Hưng Hóa province (興化副領兵, Hưng Hóa Phó lãnh binh).	Hưng Hóa Phó lãnh binh quan quan phòng	興化副領兵官關防		
Kiềm ấn of the Deputy Provincial Military Lead (Phó lãnh binh) of the Hưng Hóa province (興化副領兵, Hưng Hóa Phó lãnh binh).	Hưng Hóa Phó lãnh binh	興化副領兵		
Great seal of the Deputy Provincial Military Lead (Phó lãnh binh) of the Cao Bằng province (高平副領兵, Cao Bằng Phó lãnh binh).	Cao Bằng Phó lãnh binh quan quan phòng	高平副領兵官關防		
Kiềm ấn of the Deputy Provincial Military Lead (Phó lãnh binh) of the Cao Bằng province (高平副領兵, Cao Bằng Phó lãnh binh).	Cao Bằng Phó lãnh binh	高平副領兵		
Great seal of the Deputy Provincial Military Lead (Phó lãnh binh) of the Quảng Yên province (廣安副領兵, Quảng Yên Phó lãnh binh).	Quảng Yên Phó lãnh binh quan quan phòng	廣安副領兵官關防		
Kiềm ấn of the Deputy Provincial Military Lead (Phó lãnh binh) of the Quảng Yên province (廣安副領兵, Quảng Yên Phó lãnh binh).	Quảng Yên Phó lãnh binh	廣安副領兵		
Great seal of the Deputy Provincial Military Lead (Phó lãnh binh) of the Thanh Hóa province (清化副領兵, Thanh Hóa Phó lãnh binh).	Thanh Hóa Phó lãnh binh quan quan phòng	清化副領兵官關防		
Kiềm ấn of the Deputy Provincial Military Lead (Phó lãnh binh) of the Thanh Hóa province (清化副領兵, Thanh Hóa Phó lãnh binh).	Thanh Hóa Phó lãnh binh	清化副領兵		
Great seal of the Deputy Provincial Military Lead (Phó lãnh binh) of the Nghệ An province (乂安副領兵, Nghệ An Phó lãnh binh).	Nghệ An Phó lãnh binh quan quan phòng	乂安副領兵官關防		
Kiềm ấn of the Deputy Provincial Military Lead (Phó lãnh binh) of the Nghệ An province (乂安副領兵, Nghệ An Phó lãnh binh).	Nghệ An Phó lãnh binh	乂安副領兵		
Great seal of the Deputy Provincial Military Lead (Phó lãnh binh) of the Hà Tĩnh province (河靜副領兵, Hà Tĩnh Phó lãnh binh).	Hà Tĩnh Phó lãnh binh quan quan phòng	河靜副領兵官關防		
Kiềm ấn of the Deputy Provincial Military Lead (Phó lãnh binh) of the Hà Tĩnh province (河靜副領兵, Hà Tĩnh Phó lãnh binh).	Hà Tĩnh Phó lãnh binh	河靜副領兵		
Great seal of the Deputy Provincial Military Lead (Phó lãnh binh) of the Quảng Bình province (廣平副領兵, Quảng Bình Phó lãnh binh).	Quảng Bình Phó lãnh binh quan quan phòng	廣平副領兵官關防		
Kiềm ấn of the Deputy Provincial Military Lead (Phó lãnh binh) of the Quảng Bình province (廣平副領兵, Quảng Bình Phó lãnh binh).	Quảng Bình Phó lãnh binh	廣平副領兵		
Great seal of the Deputy Provincial Military Lead (Phó lãnh binh) of the Quảng Trị province (廣治副領兵, Quảng Trị Phó lãnh binh).	Quảng Trị Phó lãnh binh quan quan phòng	廣治副領兵官關防		
Kiềm ấn of the Deputy Provincial Military Lead (Phó lãnh binh) of the Quảng Trị province (廣治副領兵, Quảng Trị Phó lãnh binh).	Quảng Trị Phó lãnh binh	廣治副領兵		
Great seal of the Deputy Provincial Military Lead (Phó lãnh binh) of the Quảng Nam province (廣南副領兵, Quảng Nam Phó lãnh binh).	Quảng Nam Phó lãnh binh quan quan phòng	廣南副領兵官關防		
Kiềm ấn of the Deputy Provincial Military Lead (Phó lãnh binh) of the Quảng Nam province (廣南副領兵, Quảng Nam Phó lãnh binh).	Quảng Nam Phó lãnh binh	廣南副領兵		
Great seal of the Deputy Provincial Military Lead (Phó lãnh binh) of the Quảng Ngãi province (廣義副領兵, Quảng Ngãi Phó lãnh binh).	Quảng Ngãi Phó lãnh binh quan quan phòng	廣義副領兵官關防		
Kiềm ấn of the Deputy Provincial Military Lead (Phó lãnh binh) of the Quảng Ngãi province (廣義副領兵, Quảng Ngãi Phó lãnh binh).	Quảng Ngãi Phó lãnh binh	廣義副領兵		
Great seal of the Deputy Provincial Military Lead (Phó lãnh binh) of the Bình Định province (平定副領兵, Bình Định Phó lãnh binh).	Bình Định Phó lãnh binh quan quan phòng	平定副領兵官關防		
Kiềm ấn of the Deputy Provincial Military Lead (Phó lãnh binh) of the Bình Định province (平定副領兵, Bình Định Phó lãnh binh).	Bình Định Phó lãnh binh	平定副領兵		
Great seal of the Deputy Provincial Military Lead (Phó lãnh binh) of the Bình Thuận province (平順副領兵, Bình Thuận Phó lãnh binh).	Bình Thuận Phó lãnh binh quan quan phòng	平順副領兵官關防		
Kiềm ấn of the Deputy Provincial Military Lead (Phó lãnh binh) of the Bình Thuận province (平順副領兵, Bình Thuận Phó lãnh binh).	Bình Thuận Phó lãnh binh	平順副領兵		
Great seal of the Deputy Provincial Military Lead (Phó lãnh binh) of the Khánh Hòa province (慶和副領兵, Khánh Hòa Phó lãnh binh).	Khánh Hòa Phó lãnh binh quan quan phòng	慶和副領兵官關防		
Kiềm ấn of the Deputy Provincial Military Lead (Phó lãnh binh) of the Khánh Hòa province (慶和副領兵, Khánh Hòa Phó lãnh binh).	Khánh Hòa Phó lãnh binh	慶和副領兵		
Great seal of the Deputy Provincial Military Lead (Phó lãnh binh) of the Phú Yên province (富安副領兵, Phú Yên Phó lãnh binh).	Phú Yên Phó lãnh binh quan quan phòng	富安副領兵官關防		
Kiềm ấn of the Deputy Provincial Military Lead (Phó lãnh binh) of the Phú Yên province (富安副領兵, Phú Yên Phó lãnh binh).	Phú Yên Phó lãnh binh	富安副領兵		
Great seal of the Deputy Provincial Military Lead (Phó lãnh binh) of the Biên Hòa province (邊和副領兵, Biên Hòa Phó lãnh binh).	Biên Hòa Phó lãnh binh quan quan phòng	邊和副領兵官關防		
Kiềm ấn of the Deputy Provincial Military Lead (Phó lãnh binh) of the Biên Hòa province (邊和副領兵, Biên Hòa Phó lãnh binh).	Biên Hòa Phó lãnh binh	邊和副領兵		
Great seal of the Deputy Provincial Military Lead (Phó lãnh binh) of the Định Tường province (定祥副領兵, Định Tường Phó lãnh binh).	Định Tường Phó lãnh binh quan quan phòng	定祥副領兵官關防		
Kiềm ấn of the Deputy Provincial Military Lead (Phó lãnh binh) of the Định Tường province (定祥副領兵, Định Tường Phó lãnh binh).	Định Tường Phó lãnh binh	定祥副領兵		
Great seal of the Deputy Provincial Military Lead (Phó lãnh binh) of the Gia Định province (嘉定副領兵, Gia Định Phó lãnh binh).	Gia Định Phó lãnh binh quan quan phòng	嘉定副領兵官關防		
Kiềm ấn of the Deputy Provincial Military Lead (Phó lãnh binh) of the Gia Định province (嘉定副領兵, Gia Định Phó lãnh binh).	Gia Định Phó lãnh binh	嘉定副領兵		
Great seal of the Deputy Provincial Military Lead (Phó lãnh binh) of the Hà Tiên province (河僊副領兵, Hà Tiên Phó lãnh binh).	Hà Tiên Phó lãnh binh quan quan phòng	河僊副領兵官關防		
Kiềm ấn of the Deputy Provincial Military Lead (Phó lãnh binh) of the Hà Tiên province (河僊副領兵, Hà Tiên Phó lãnh binh).	Hà Tiên Phó lãnh binh	河僊副領兵		
Great seal of the Deputy Provincial Military Lead (Phó lãnh binh) of the An Giang province (安江副領兵, An Giang Phó lãnh binh).	An Giang Phó lãnh binh quan quan phòng	安江副領兵官關防		
Kiềm ấn of the Deputy Provincial Military Lead (Phó lãnh binh) of the An Giang province (安江副領兵, An Giang Phó lãnh binh).	An Giang Phó lãnh binh	安江副領兵		
Great seal of the Deputy Provincial Military Lead (Phó lãnh binh) of the Vĩnh Long province (永隆副領兵, Vĩnh Long Phó lãnh binh).	Vĩnh Long Phó lãnh binh quan quan phòng	永隆副領兵官關防		
Kiềm ấn of the Deputy Provincial Military Lead (Phó lãnh binh) of the Vĩnh Long province (永隆副領兵, Vĩnh Long Phó lãnh binh).	Vĩnh Long Phó lãnh binh	永隆副領兵		

=== Police seals ===
Rank and / or division	Inscription (chữ Quốc ngữ)	Inscription (chữ Hán)	Image of the seal	Print of the seal
Great seal of the Capital defending service (護城, Hộ thành).	Hộ thành nha ấn	護城衙印		
Small seal of the Capital defending service (護城, Hộ thành).	Hộ thành	護城		

=== Tax-related seals ===
Rank or division	Inscription (chữ Quốc ngữ)	Inscription (chữ Hán)	Image of the seal	Print of the seal
Cinnamon tax				
Tax revenue	Đại Nam Thành Thái	大南成泰		
Tax revenue	Thập tiên - Do trị giá tiền nhất bách quán dĩ thượng chí bất cúp nhất thiên quán nghe dụng thử (Note: Ten cents - This is suitable for transactions with a value of more than one hundred strings of cash coins to less than one thousand strings of cash coins.)	十仙 - 由值價錢一百貫以上至不及一千貫宜用此		

=== Mint seals ===
Mint	Inscription (chữ Quốc ngữ)	Inscription (chữ Hán)	Image of the seal	Print of the seal
Seal of the Office of Currency (Bảo Tuyền Cục).				
Seal of the Capital Office of Currency (Bảo Hoá Kinh Cục).				
Seal of the Hanoi Office of Current Money (河內通寶局, Hà Nội Thông Bảo Cục).				

=== Seals of educational institutions and administrators ===
==== Provincial entrance exam schools ====
Office or organisation	Inscription (chữ Quốc ngữ)	Inscription (chữ Hán)	Image of the seal	Print of the seal
Great seal of the Provincial Confucian court examination school (Thí trường) of the Hà Nội province (河內試場, Hà Nội Thí trường).	Hà Nội Thí trường chi ấn	河內試場之印		
Great seal of the Provincial Confucian court examination school (Thí trường) of the Hưng Yên province (興安試場, Hưng Yên Thí trường).	Hưng Yên Thí trường chi ấn	興安試場之印		
Great seal of the Provincial Confucian court examination school (Thí trường) of the Bắc Ninh province (北寧試場, Bắc Ninh Thí trường).	Bắc Ninh Thí trường chi ấn	北寧試場之印		
Great seal of the Provincial Confucian court examination school (Thí trường) of the Nam Định province (南定試場, Nam Định Thí trường).	Nam Định Thí trường chi ấn	南定試場之印		
Great seal of the Provincial Confucian court examination school (Thí trường) of the Hải Dương province (海陽試場, Hải Dương Thí trường).	Hải Dương Thí trường chi ấn	海陽試場之印		
Great seal of the Provincial Confucian court examination school (Thí trường) of the Sơn Tây province (山西試場, Sơn Tây Thí trường).	Sơn Tây Thí trường chi ấn	山西試場之印		
Great seal of the Provincial Confucian court examination school (Thí trường) of the Ninh Bình province (寧平試場, Ninh Bình Thí trường).	Ninh Bình Thí trường chi ấn	寧平試場之印		
Great seal of the Provincial Confucian court examination school (Thí trường) of the Thái Nguyên province (太原試場, Thái Nguyên Thí trường).	Thái Nguyên Thí trường chi ấn	太原試場之印		
Great seal of the Provincial Confucian court examination school (Thí trường) of the Lạng Sơn province (諒山試場, Lạng Sơn Thí trường).	Lạng Sơn Thí trường chi ấn	諒山試場之印		
Great seal of the Provincial Confucian court examination school (Thí trường) of the Tuyên Quang province (宣光試場, Tuyên Quang Thí trường).	Tuyên Quang Thí trường chi ấn	宣光試場之印		
Great seal of the Provincial Confucian court examination school (Thí trường) of the Hưng Hóa province (興化試場, Hưng Hóa Thí trường).	Hưng Hóa Thí trường chi ấn	興化試場之印		
Great seal of the Provincial Confucian court examination school (Thí trường) of the Cao Bằng province (高平試場, Cao Bằng Thí trường).	Cao Bằng Thí trường chi ấn	高平試場之印		
Great seal of the Provincial Confucian court examination school (Thí trường) of the Quảng Yên province (廣安試場, Quảng Yên Thí trường).	Quảng Yên Thí trường chi ấn	廣安試場之印		
Great seal of the Provincial Confucian court examination school (Thí trường) of the Thanh Hóa province (清化試場, Thanh Hóa Thí trường).	Thanh Hóa Thí trường chi ấn	清化試場之印		
Great seal of the Provincial Confucian court examination school (Thí trường) of the Nghệ An province (乂安試場, Nghệ An Thí trường).	Nghệ An Thí trường chi ấn	乂安試場之印		
Great seal of the Provincial Confucian court examination school (Thí trường) of the Hà Tĩnh province (河靜試場, Hà Tĩnh Thí trường).	Hà Tĩnh Thí trường chi ấn	河靜試場之印		
Great seal of the Provincial Confucian court examination school (Thí trường) of the Quảng Bình province (廣平試場, Quảng Bình Thí trường).	Quảng Bình Thí trường chi ấn	廣平試場之印		
Great seal of the Provincial Confucian court examination school (Thí trường) of the Quảng Trị province (廣治試場, Quảng Trị Thí trường).	Quảng Trị Thí trường chi ấn	廣治試場之印		
Great seal of the Provincial Confucian court examination school (Thí trường) of the Quảng Nam province (廣南試場, Quảng Nam Thí trường).	Quảng Nam Thí trường chi ấn	廣南試場之印		
Great seal of the Provincial Confucian court examination school (Thí trường) of the Quảng Ngãi province (廣義試場, Quảng Ngãi Thí trường).	Quảng Ngãi Thí trường chi ấn	廣義試場之印		
Great seal of the Provincial Confucian court examination school (Thí trường) of the Bình Định province (平定試場, Bình Định Thí trường).	Bình Định Thí trường chi ấn	平定試場之印		
Great seal of the Provincial Confucian court examination school (Thí trường) of the Bình Thuận province (平順試場, Bình Thuận Thí trường).	Bình Thuận Thí trường chi ấn	平順試場之印		
Great seal of the Provincial Confucian court examination school (Thí trường) of the Khánh Hòa province (慶和試場, Khánh Hòa Thí trường).	Khánh Hòa Thí trường chi ấn	慶和試場之印		
Great seal of the Provincial Confucian court examination school (Thí trường) of the Phú Yên province (富安試場, Phú Yên Thí trường).	Phú Yên Thí trường chi ấn	富安試場之印		
Great seal of the Provincial Confucian court examination school (Thí trường) of the Biên Hòa province (邊和試場, Biên Hòa Thí trường).	Biên Hòa Thí trường chi ấn	邊和試場之印		
Great seal of the Provincial Confucian court examination school (Thí trường) of the Định Tường province (定祥試場, Định Tường Thí trường).	Định Tường Thí trường chi ấn	定祥試場之印		
Great seal of the Provincial Confucian court examination school (Thí trường) of the Gia Định province (嘉定試場, Gia Định Thí trường).	Gia Định Thí trường chi ấn	嘉定試場之印		
Great seal of the Provincial Confucian court examination school (Thí trường) of the Hà Tiên province (河僊試場, Hà Tiên Thí trường).	Hà Tiên Thí trường chi ấn	河僊試場之印		
Great seal of the Provincial Confucian court examination school (Thí trường) of the An Giang province (安江試場, An Giang Thí trường).	An Giang Thí trường chi ấn	安江試場之印		
Great seal of the Provincial Confucian court examination school (Thí trường) of the Vĩnh Long province (永隆試場, Vĩnh Long Thí trường).	Vĩnh Long Thí trường chi ấn	永隆試場之印		

==== Provincial education commissioners ====
Office or organisation	Inscription (chữ Quốc ngữ)	Inscription (chữ Hán)	Image of the seal	Print of the seal
Great seal of the Provincial Education Commissioner (Đốc học) of the Hà Nội province (河內督學, Hà Nội Đốc học).	Hà Nội Học chính quan phòng	河內學政關防		
Kiềm ấn of the Provincial Education Commissioner (Đốc học) of the Hà Nội province (河內督學, Hà Nội Đốc học).	Hà Nội Học chính	河內學政		
Great seal of the Provincial Education Commissioner (Đốc học) of the Hưng Yên province (興安督學, Hưng Yên Đốc học).	Hưng Yên Học chính quan phòng	興安學政關防		
Kiềm ấn of the Provincial Education Commissioner (Đốc học) of the Hưng Yên province (興安督學, Hưng Yên Đốc học).	Hưng Yên Học chính	興安學政		
Great seal of the Provincial Education Commissioner (Đốc học) of the Bắc Ninh province (北寧督學, Bắc Ninh Đốc học).	Bắc Ninh Học chính quan phòng	北寧學政關防		
Kiềm ấn of the Provincial Education Commissioner (Đốc học) of the Bắc Ninh province (北寧督學, Bắc Ninh Đốc học).	Bắc Ninh Học chính	北寧學政		
Great seal of the Provincial Education Commissioner (Đốc học) of the Nam Định province (南定督學, Nam Định Đốc học).	Nam Định Học chính quan phòng	南定學政關防		
Kiềm ấn of the Provincial Education Commissioner (Đốc học) of the Nam Định province (南定督學, Nam Định Đốc học).	Nam Định Học chính	南定學政		
Great seal of the Provincial Education Commissioner (Đốc học) of the Hải Dương province (海陽督學, Hải Dương Đốc học).	Hải Dương Học chính quan phòng	海陽學政關防		
Kiềm ấn of the Provincial Education Commissioner (Đốc học) of the Hải Dương province (海陽督學, Hải Dương Đốc học).	Hải Dương Học chính	海陽學政		
Great seal of the Provincial Education Commissioner (Đốc học) of the Sơn Tây province (山西督學, Sơn Tây Đốc học).	Sơn Tây Học chính quan phòng	山西學政關防		
Kiềm ấn of the Provincial Education Commissioner (Đốc học) of the Sơn Tây province (山西督學, Sơn Tây Đốc học).	Sơn Tây Học chính	山西學政		
Great seal of the Provincial Education Commissioner (Đốc học) of the Ninh Bình province (寧平督學, Ninh Bình Đốc học).	Ninh Bình Học chính quan phòng	寧平學政關防		
Kiềm ấn of the Provincial Education Commissioner (Đốc học) of the Ninh Bình province (寧平督學, Ninh Bình Đốc học).	Ninh Bình Học chính	寧平學政		
Great seal of the Provincial Education Commissioner (Đốc học) of the Thái Nguyên province (太原督學, Thái Nguyên Đốc học).	Thái Nguyên Học chính quan phòng	太原學政關防		
Kiềm ấn of the Provincial Education Commissioner (Đốc học) of the Thái Nguyên province (太原督學, Thái Nguyên Đốc học).	Thái Nguyên Học chính	太原學政		
Great seal of the Provincial Education Commissioner (Đốc học) of the Lạng Sơn province (諒山督學, Lạng Sơn Đốc học).	Lạng Sơn Học chính quan phòng	諒山學政關防		
Kiềm ấn of the Provincial Education Commissioner (Đốc học) of the Lạng Sơn province (諒山督學, Lạng Sơn Đốc học).	Lạng Sơn Học chính	諒山學政		
Great seal of the Provincial Education Commissioner (Đốc học) of the Tuyên Quang province (宣光督學, Tuyên Quang Đốc học).	Tuyên Quang Học chính quan phòng	宣光學政關防		
Kiềm ấn of the Provincial Education Commissioner (Đốc học) of the Tuyên Quang province (宣光督學, Tuyên Quang Đốc học).	Tuyên Quang Học chính	宣光學政		
Great seal of the Provincial Education Commissioner (Đốc học) of the Hưng Hóa province (興化督學, Hưng Hóa Đốc học).	Hưng Hóa Học chính quan phòng	興化學政關防		
Kiềm ấn of the Provincial Education Commissioner (Đốc học) of the Hưng Hóa province (興化督學, Hưng Hóa Đốc học).	Hưng Hóa Học chính	興化學政		
Great seal of the Provincial Education Commissioner (Đốc học) of the Cao Bằng province (高平督學, Cao Bằng Đốc học).	Cao Bằng Học chính quan phòng	高平學政關防		
Kiềm ấn of the Provincial Education Commissioner (Đốc học) of the Cao Bằng province (高平督學, Cao Bằng Đốc học).	Cao Bằng Học chính	高平學政		
Great seal of the Provincial Education Commissioner (Đốc học) of the Quảng Yên province (廣安督學, Quảng Yên Đốc học).	Quảng Yên Học chính quan phòng	廣安學政關防		
Kiềm ấn of the Provincial Education Commissioner (Đốc học) of the Quảng Yên province (廣安督學, Quảng Yên Đốc học).	Quảng Yên Học chính	廣安學政		
Great seal of the Provincial Education Commissioner (Đốc học) of the Thanh Hóa province (清化督學, Thanh Hóa Đốc học).	Thanh Hóa Học chính quan phòng	清化學政關防		
Kiềm ấn of the Provincial Education Commissioner (Đốc học) of the Thanh Hóa province (清化督學, Thanh Hóa Đốc học).	Thanh Hóa Học chính	清化學政		
Great seal of the Provincial Education Commissioner (Đốc học) of the Nghệ An province (乂安督學, Nghệ An Đốc học).	Nghệ An Học chính quan phòng	乂安學政關防		
Kiềm ấn of the Provincial Education Commissioner (Đốc học) of the Nghệ An province (乂安督學, Nghệ An Đốc học).	Nghệ An Học chính	乂安學政		
Great seal of the Provincial Education Commissioner (Đốc học) of the Hà Tĩnh province (河靜督學, Hà Tĩnh Đốc học).	Hà Tĩnh Học chính quan phòng	河靜學政關防		
Kiềm ấn of the Provincial Education Commissioner (Đốc học) of the Hà Tĩnh province (河靜督學, Hà Tĩnh Đốc học).	Hà Tĩnh Học chính	河靜學政		
Great seal of the Provincial Education Commissioner (Đốc học) of the Quảng Bình province (廣平督學, Quảng Bình Đốc học).	Quảng Bình Học chính quan phòng	廣平學政關防		
Kiềm ấn of the Provincial Education Commissioner (Đốc học) of the Quảng Bình province (廣平督學, Quảng Bình Đốc học).	Quảng Bình Học chính	廣平學政		
Great seal of the Provincial Education Commissioner (Đốc học) of the Quảng Trị province (廣治督學, Quảng Trị Đốc học).	Quảng Trị Học chính quan phòng	廣治學政關防		
Kiềm ấn of the Provincial Education Commissioner (Đốc học) of the Quảng Trị province (廣治督學, Quảng Trị Đốc học).	Quảng Trị Học chính	廣治學政		
Great seal of the Provincial Education Commissioner (Đốc học) of the Quảng Nam province (廣南督學, Quảng Nam Đốc học).	Quảng Nam Học chính quan phòng	廣南學政關防		
Kiềm ấn of the Provincial Education Commissioner (Đốc học) of the Quảng Nam province (廣南督學, Quảng Nam Đốc học).	Quảng Nam Học chính	廣南學政		
Great seal of the Provincial Education Commissioner (Đốc học) of the Quảng Ngãi province (廣義督學, Quảng Ngãi Đốc học).	Quảng Ngãi Học chính quan phòng	廣義學政關防		
Kiềm ấn of the Provincial Education Commissioner (Đốc học) of the Quảng Ngãi province (廣義督學, Quảng Ngãi Đốc học).	Quảng Ngãi Học chính	廣義學政		
Great seal of the Provincial Education Commissioner (Đốc học) of the Bình Định province (平定督學, Bình Định Đốc học).	Bình Định Học chính quan phòng	平定學政關防		
Kiềm ấn of the Provincial Education Commissioner (Đốc học) of the Bình Định province (平定督學, Bình Định Đốc học).	Bình Định Học chính	平定學政		
Great seal of the Provincial Education Commissioner (Đốc học) of the Bình Thuận province (平順督學, Bình Thuận Đốc học).	Bình Thuận Học chính quan phòng	平順學政關防		
Kiềm ấn of the Provincial Education Commissioner (Đốc học) of the Bình Thuận province (平順督學, Bình Thuận Đốc học).	Bình Thuận Học chính	平順學政		
Great seal of the Provincial Education Commissioner (Đốc học) of the Khánh Hòa province (慶和督學, Khánh Hòa Bố chính sứ).	Khánh Hòa Học chính quan phòng	慶和學政關防		
Kiềm ấn of the Provincial Education Commissioner (Đốc học) of the Khánh Hòa province (慶和督學, Khánh Hòa Đốc học).	Khánh Hòa Học chính	慶和學政		
Great seal of the Provincial Education Commissioner (Đốc học) of the Phú Yên province (富安督學, Phú Yên Đốc học).	Phú Yên Học chính quan phòng	富安學政關防		
Kiềm ấn of the Provincial Education Commissioner (Đốc học) of the Phú Yên province (富安督學, Phú Yên Đốc học).	Phú Yên Học chính	富安學政		
Great seal of the Provincial Education Commissioner (Đốc học) of the Biên Hòa province (邊和督學, Biên Hòa Đốc học).	Biên Hòa Học chính quan phòng	邊和學政關防		
Kiềm ấn of the Provincial Education Commissioner (Đốc học) of the Biên Hòa province (邊和督學, Biên Hòa Đốc học).	Biên Hòa Học chính	邊和學政		
Great seal of the Provincial Education Commissioner (Đốc học) of the Định Tường province (定祥督學, Định Tường Đốc học).	Định Tường Học chính quan phòng	定祥學政關防		
Kiềm ấn of the Provincial Education Commissioner (Đốc học) of the Định Tường province (定祥督學, Định Tường Đốc học).	Định Tường Học chính	定祥學政		
Great seal of the Provincial Education Commissioner (Đốc học) of the Gia Định province (嘉定督學, Gia Định Đốc học).	Gia Định Học chính quan phòng	嘉定學政關防		
Kiềm ấn of the Provincial Education Commissioner (Đốc học) of the Gia Định province (嘉定督學, Gia Định Đốc học).	Gia Định Học chính	嘉定學政		
Great seal of the Provincial Education Commissioner (Đốc học) of the Hà Tiên province (河僊督學, Hà Tiên Đốc học).	Hà Tiên Học chính quan phòng	河僊學政關防		
Kiềm ấn of the Provincial Education Commissioner (Đốc học) of the Hà Tiên province (河僊督學, Hà Tiên Đốc học).	Hà Tiên Học chính	河僊學政		
Great seal of the Provincial Education Commissioner (Đốc học) of the An Giang province (安江督學, An Giang Đốc học).	An Giang Học chính quan phòng	安江學政關防		
Kiềm ấn of the Provincial Education Commissioner (Đốc học) of the An Giang province (安江督學, An Giang Đốc học).	An Giang Học chính	安江學政		
Great seal of the Provincial Education Commissioner (Đốc học) of the Vĩnh Long province (永隆督學, Vĩnh Long Đốc học).	Vĩnh Long Học chính quan phòng	永隆學政關防		
Kiềm ấn of the Provincial Education Commissioner (Đốc học) of the Vĩnh Long province (永隆督學, Vĩnh Long Đốc học).	Vĩnh Long Học chính	永隆學政		

=== Trade and business seals ===
==== Provincial ship merchant managers ====
Office or organisation	Inscription (chữ Quốc ngữ)	Inscription (chữ Hán)	Image of the seal	Print of the seal
Great seal of the Manager of the Trade Office (衙商政, Nha Thương chính) of the Hải Dương province (管理海陽商政, Quản lý Hải Dương Thương chính).	Quản lý Hải Dương Thương chính quan phòng	管理海陽商政關防		
Kiềm ấn of the Manager of the Trade Office (衙商政, Nha Thương chính) of the Hải Dương province (管理海陽商政, Quản lý Hải Dương Thương chính).	Hải Dương Thương chính	海陽商政		

=== Other government seals ===
Use	Inscription (chữ Quốc ngữ)	Inscription (chữ Hán)	Image of the seal	Print of the seal
Seal for correspondence between Huế and Hanoi.	Thừa Thiên phủ dĩ bắc chí Hà Nội chư địa phương quan	承天府以北至河内諸地方官		

== Government office seals on documents ==
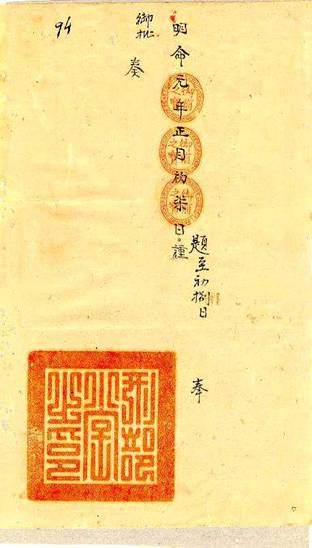
The Hình bộ đường chi ấn on a document from the year Minh Mạng 1 (1820).

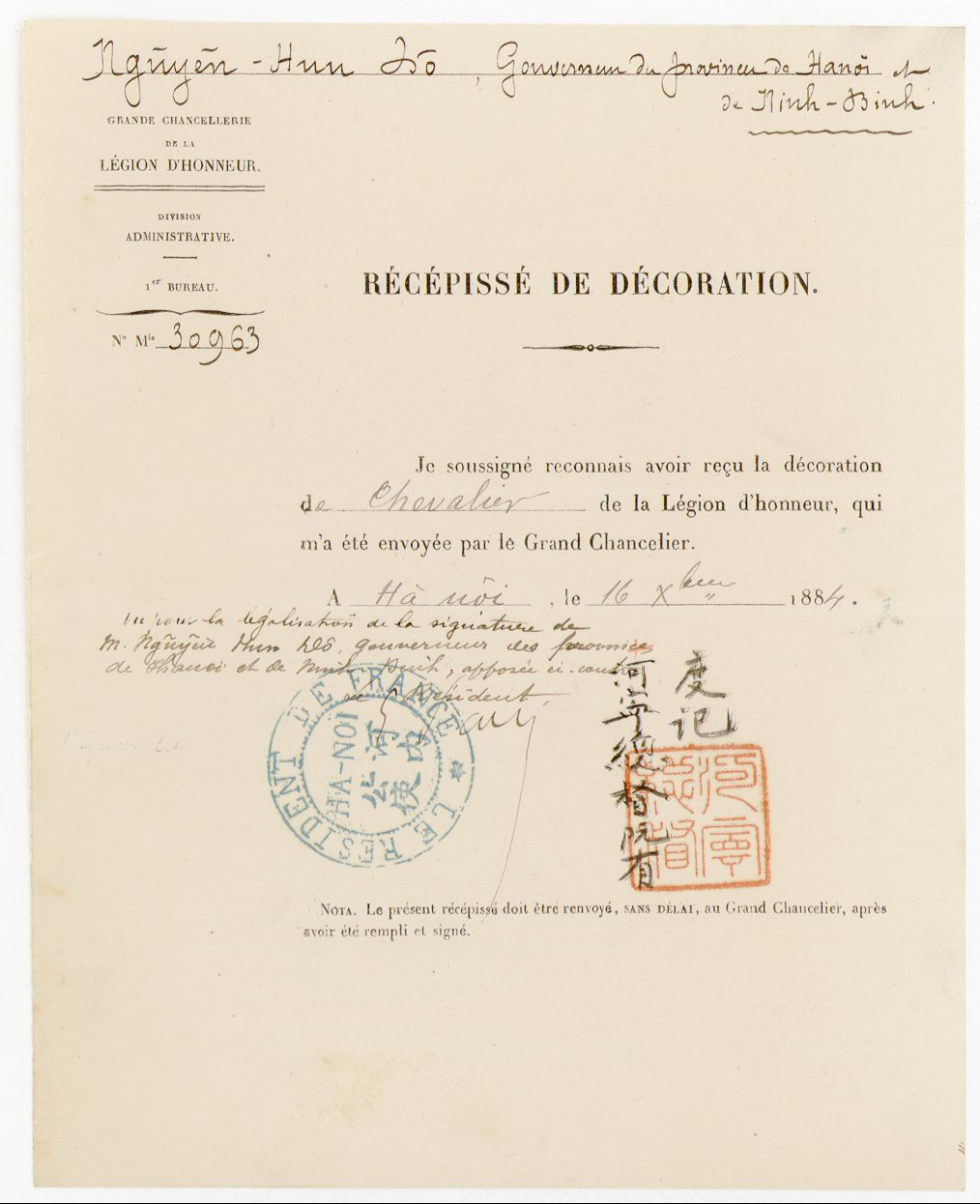
A Legion of Honour certificate issued in 1884 for Nguyễn Hữu Độ with the seal of the Tổng đốc of Hà Ninh (Hanoi and Ninh Bình).

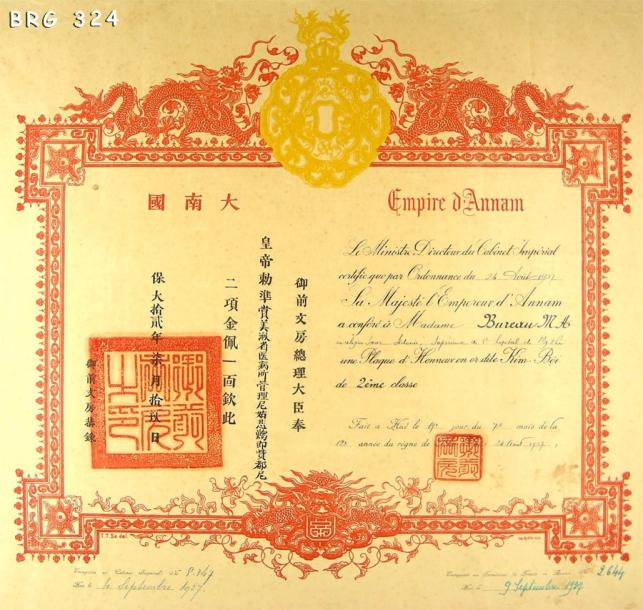
A certificate awarding a Kim Bội (2nd class) to Madame Bureau who works at a Catholic hospital with the Cơ mật viện's great seal, dated Bảo Đại 12 (保大拾貳年, 1937).

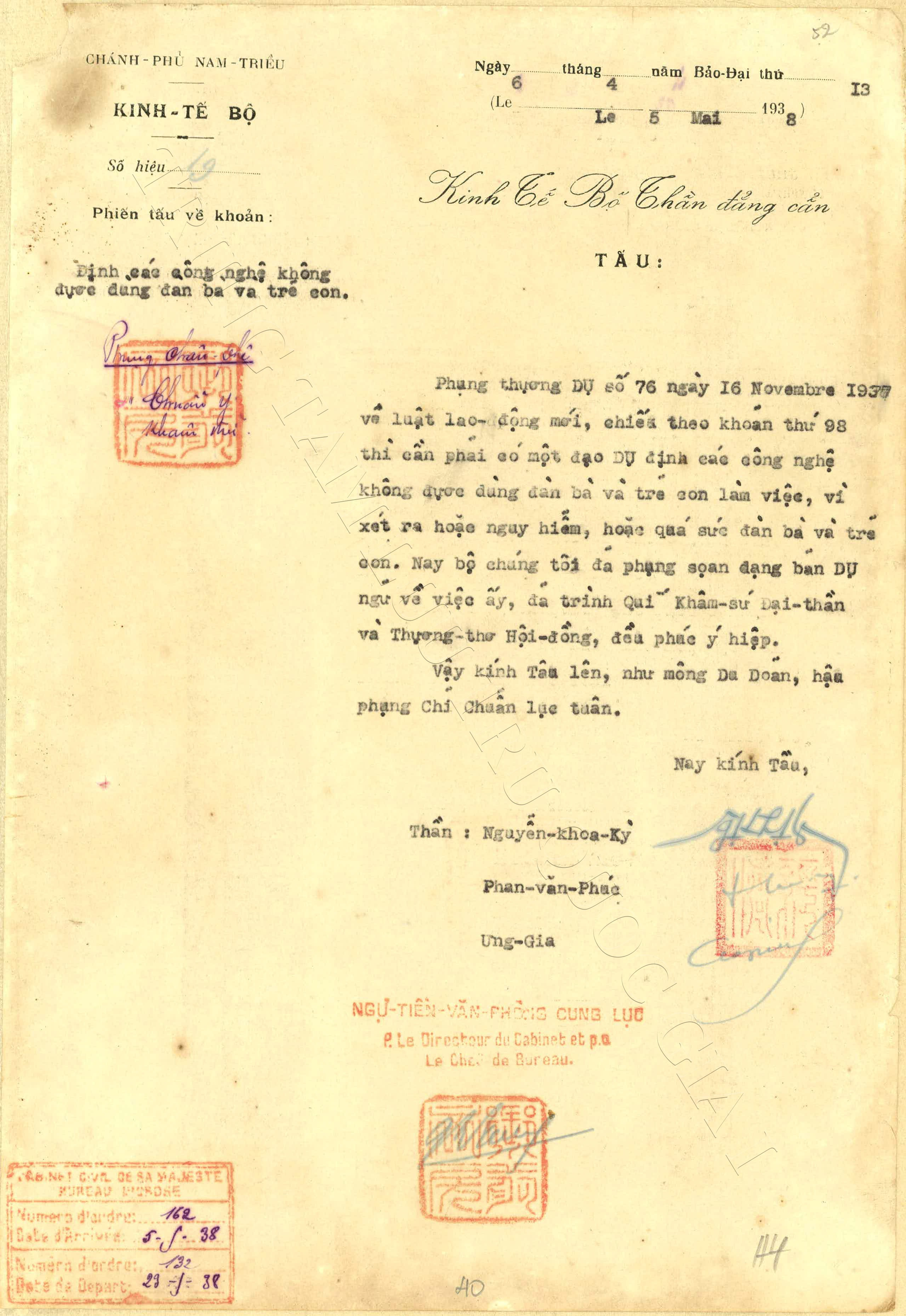
A Bảo Đại 13 (1938) letter by the Ministry of Economic Affairs also featuring seals of the Ngự tiền văn phòng.

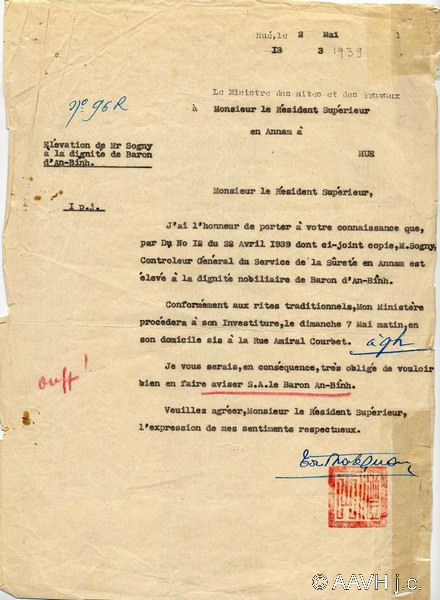
A Bảo Đại 14 (1939) letter from the Ministry of Rites and Public Works to the Resident-Superior of Annam informing him that Léon Sogny will be given the noble title "Baron of An Bình".

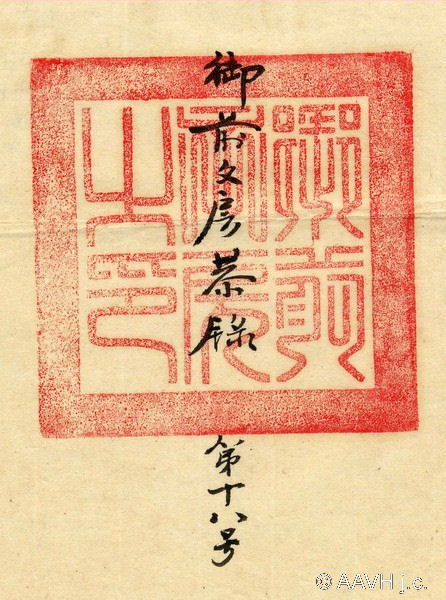
A certificate awarding the title of "Baron of An Bình" to Léon Sogny with the Cơ mật viện's great seal, dated Bảo Đại 14 (保大拾肆年, 1939).

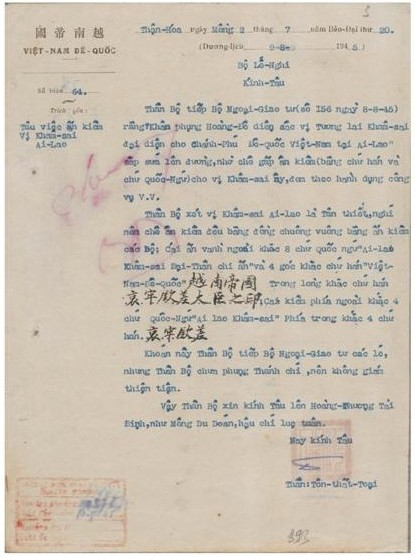
A Bảo Đại 20 (1945) report by the Ministry of Rites and Ceremonies on creating a seal for the imperial envoy of the Empire of Vietnam to the Kingdom of Laos.

== List of seals of the Nguyễn dynasty period nobility ==
=== Imperial ranks ===
==== Dukes ====
Title	Inscription (chữ Quốc ngữ)	Inscription (chữ Hán)	Image of the seal	Print of the seal
Duke of Ninh Thuận.	Ninh Thuận công ấn	寧順公印		
Duke of Ninh Thuận.	Ninh Thuận quan phòng	寧順關防		
Duke of Thọ Xuân.	Thọ Xuân công ấn	壽春公印		
Duke of Trường Khánh.	Trường Khánh công ấn	長慶公印		
Duke of Kiến An.	Kiến An công ấn	建安公印		
Duke of Định Viễn.	Định Viễn công ấn	定遠公印		
Duke of Diên Khánh.	Diên Khánh công ấn	延慶公印		
Duke of Phú Bình.	Phú Bình công ấn	富平公印		
Duke of Thường Tín.	Thường Tín công ấn	常信公印		
Duke of Từ Sơn.	Từ Sơn công ấn	慈山公印		
Duke of Tùng Thiện.	Tùng Thiện công ấn	從善公印		

=== Non-imperial ranks ===
==== Barons ====
Title	Inscription (chữ Quốc ngữ)	Inscription (chữ Hán)	Image of the seal	Print of the seal
Baron of An Bình	An Bình Nam chi ấn	安平男之印		
Baron of An Phước	An Phước	安福		

== Shapes of seals ==
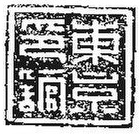
Square seal.

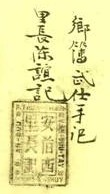
Rectangular seal.

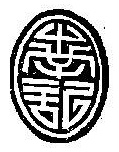
Ellipse seal.

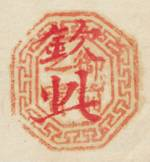
Octagonal seal.

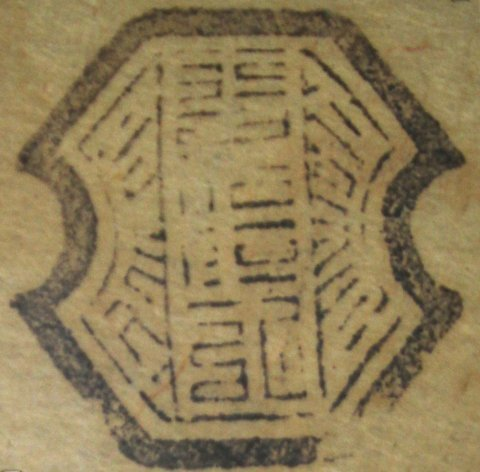

== Seals in the Socialist Republic of Vietnam ==
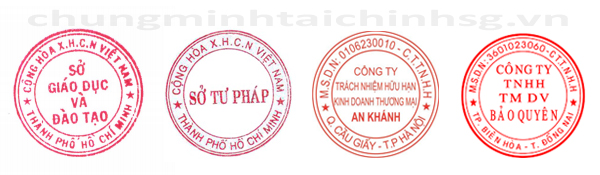
Examples of typical modern Vietnamese seals used in the Socialist Republic of Vietnam by both corporations and governments, each of any size.

In modern Vietnam square seals with seal script characters no longer enjoy official use, instead, according to state regulations, each company or enterprise should have its own round seal. These seals are round in shape and must contain both the name and registration number of the organisation. According to the Enterprise Law 2014 (Luật doanh nghiệp năm 2014) in order to create more favourable conditions for Vietnamese businesses, when registering the seal sample, businesses are no longer required to register with the police. Instead, the company can engrave the seal sample by itself and send the seal sample to the business registration office. When the enterprise uses a new seal or changes the company's seal information, the company is required to register the new company seal sample with the government. In 2021 an official seal typically costs đ350.000 a piece.

The Hoan phụng ngũ đại đồng đường nhất thống Thiệu Trị chi bảo (歡奉五大同堂一統紹治之寶) seal created during the reign of the Tự Đức Emperor has been described as "one of the earliest Vietnamese round seals". Later, a number of other round and ellipse-shaped imperial seals were created by the Nguyễn Empire.

Government seals in the Socialist Republic of Vietnam today are usually circular in shape, and have the emblem of Vietnam in the centre of the circle. The name of the governmental institution is arranged around the national emblem in a semicircle.

Examples

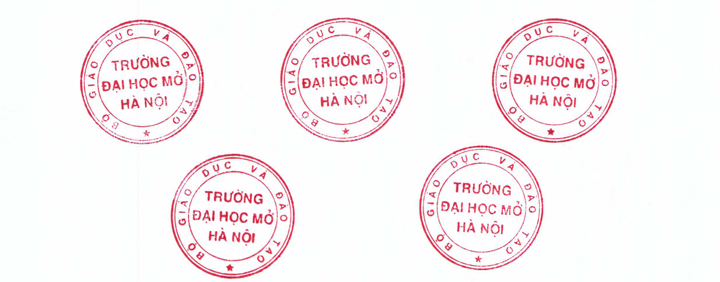
Seal of Hanoi Open University.

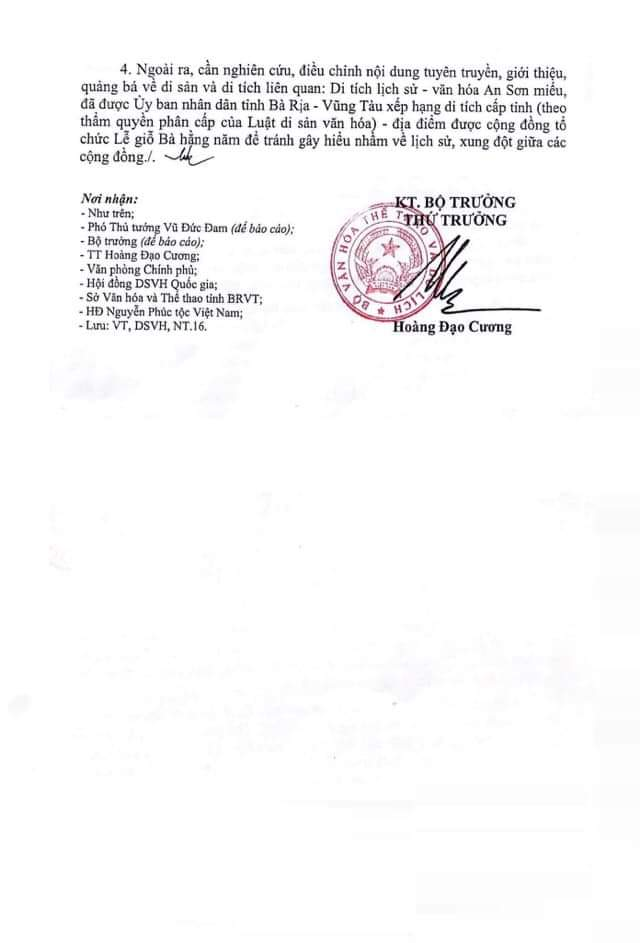
Seal of the Ministry of Culture, Sports and Tourism of Vietnam.

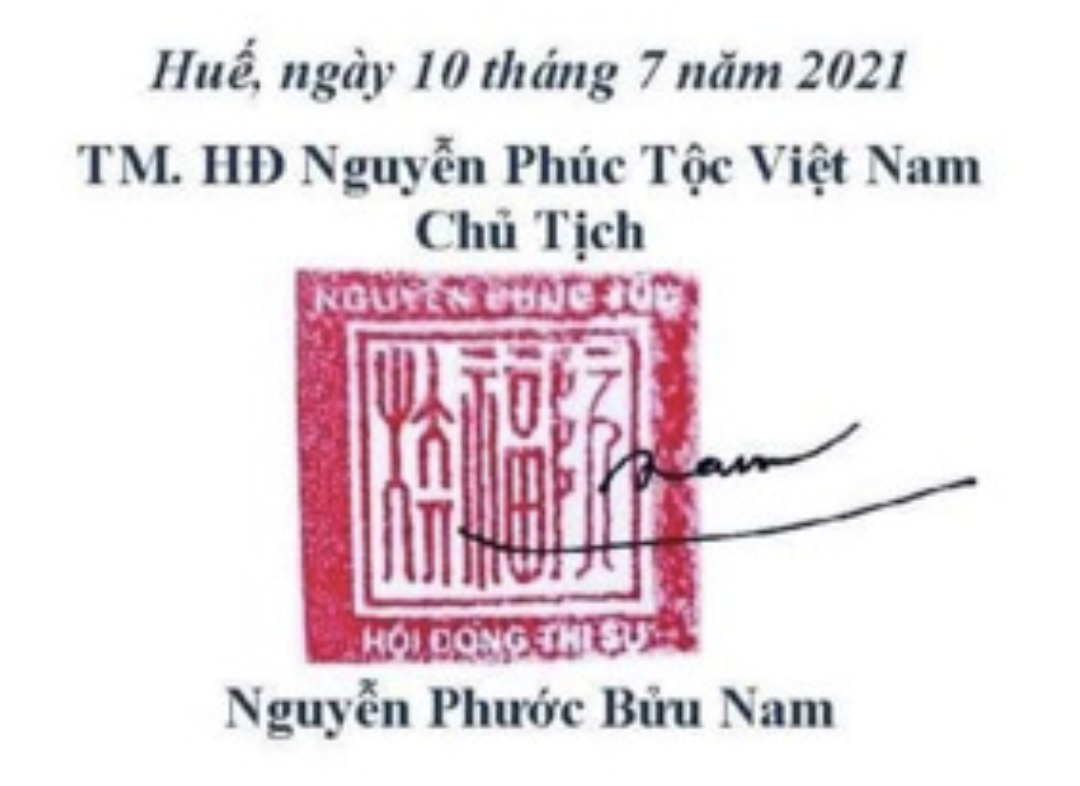
Seal of the Hội đồng Nguyễn Phúc Tộc Việt Nam.

== The study of historical seals in modern Vietnam ==
There is a scholarly discipline which specialises in the study of seals printed on various types of documents produced by the various dynasties in Vietnamese history. According to Professor Hà Văn Tấn, a scholar specialised in this field, the seals on ancient documents usually had 3 specific functions: ensuring the authenticity of the document, asserting the ownership of the text, and determining the document's date of signing.

Studies on the Nguyễn dynasty's imperial archives have progressed the works of different areas of scholarship including administration studies, document studies, family annals studies, and seal studies. As the imperial archives show a deep insight into the evolution of the documents (including the seals and how they were used) over the course of the Nguyễn dynasty period.

In 2013 Hà Văn Huề, Nguyễn Thị Thu Hường, Đoàn Thị Thu Thuỷ, and Associate Professor Nguyễn Công Việt published a book entitled Ấn chương trên Châu bản triều Nguyễn to introduce to the public and researchers the types of seals used by the government of the Nguyễn dynasty and its agencies at every level. Thereby, partly providing more information for research in the fields of Hán-Nôm Studies, Literature, Archives, Textology, Historianism, Etc.

== See also ==
- Banknote seal (China)
- Coat of arms of the Nguyễn dynasty
- Emblem of Vietnam
- Heirloom Seal of the Realm
- National seals of the Republic of China
- Seal of the People's Government of the People's Republic of China
- Privy Seal of Japan
- State Seal of Japan
- Seal of South Korea
- Seal carving

== Sources ==
- Nguyễn Công Việt – Ấn Chương Việt Nam (NXB Khoa Học Xã Hội 2005), 550 pp. (in Vietnamese).
- ThS. Hà Văn Huề; ThS. Nguyễn Thị Thu Hường; ThS. Đoàn Thị Thu Thuỷ; PGS.TS Nguyễn Công Việt (2013), Ấn chương trên Châu bản triều Nguyễn [Seals on Nguyen Dynasty Royal Records] (in Vietnamese), Hanoi Book Publishing House
