= Cheongsin Low =

Malaysian calligrapher and stone engraver

Cheongsin Low (Chinese: 刘创新) is a nationally renowned Malaysian calligrapher and stone engraver born in Selangor in 1973. He is one of only four hundred members of the Xiling Seal Art Society, one of the most important Chinese arts organisations, and the only international member from Malaysia.
