= Jinyu =

Jinyu may refer to:

- Jinyu, the Chinese name for Jin Chinese, a subdivision of spoken Chinese
- Jinyu (given name), a Chinese given name
- Jinyu station (Chongqing Rail Transit), a station on Line 3 (Chongqing Rail Transit)
- Jinyu station (Fuzhou Metro), a station on Line 2 (Fuzhou Metro)
- Jinyu Hutong station, a station on Line 8 (Beijing Subway)
