= Ting tong =

Ting Tong may refer to:

- Ting Tong (TV series), a 2020 Indian animated television series, spin-off from Gattu Battu
- Ting Tong Macadangdang, a character from the UK television series Little Britain
- Inner Ting Tong and Outer Ting Tong, near Budleigh Salterton in South East Devon, England; see Thing (assembly) § Viking and medieval society

== See also ==
- Ding Dong (disambiguation)
- Ting Ting, a name
