= Side carving =

Side carving (simplified Chinese: 边刻; traditional Chinese: 邊刻; pinyin: biānkè) is a form of traditional seal carving techniques that originated in ancient China. It was later introduced to other countries in East Asia and has gained popularity among contemporary seal artists from regions including Hong Kong, South Korea, Japan, Singapore, etc. It mainly focuses on developing pattern design skills and techniques applied to the carving of side surfaces of a seal, which distinguishes itself as a unique carving technique from knob carving (head part) and face carving (bottom part). It decorates the side surfaces of seals with literal or pictorial imagery.

== History ==
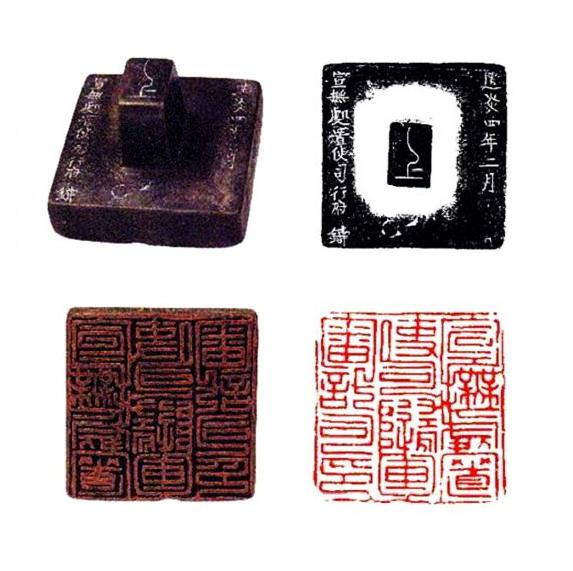
Side engraving of a governmental seal of the Song dynasty (c. 1,000 years ago). Remarks shows the issue date and the office of the seal

The history of this art can be traced back as early as the Late Zhou and Qin dynasties when government or official seals had short notations on their side surfaces indicating the owner of the seal (by engraving the owner's name), the maker of the seal (by engraving the craftsman's name), and/or the date of manufacture. But during those periods such notations appeared only occasionally and were normally very brief.

In the late Yuan dynasty such art style became more popular, accompanying the appearance of famous seal artists, such as Wang Mian (王冕).

In the Ming and Qing dynasties the seal engraving art was commonly seen. The art became prosperous first in mid and late Ming dynasty when scholar-artists became dominant in southeast China.

== Types ==
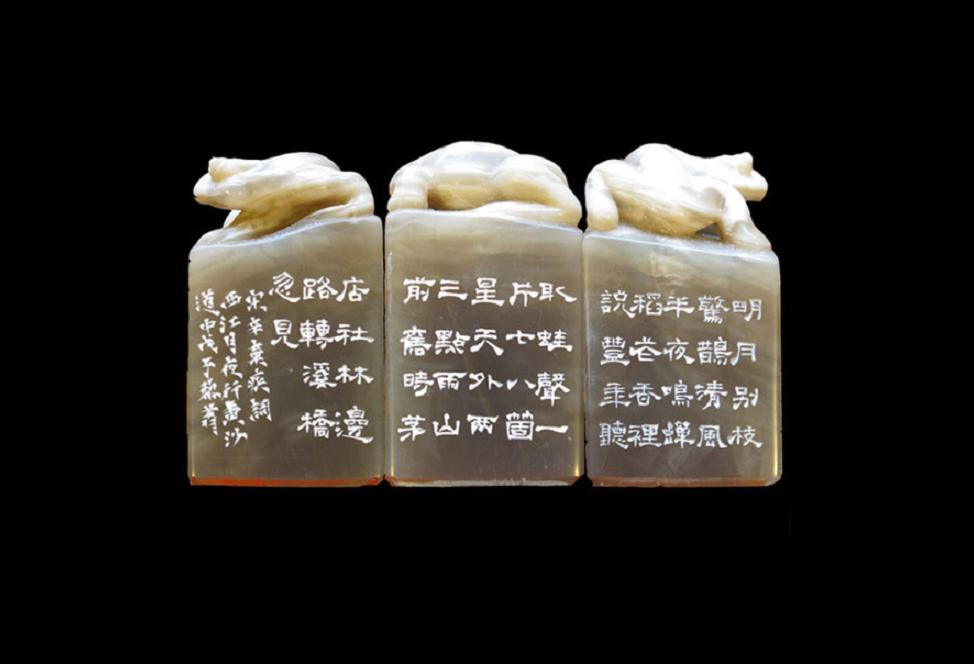
An example of side engraving, including a poem about frogs and some remarks (date, author, etc.)

=== With characters ===
- A very common form of the art are short sentences indicating the owner of the seal, the maker of the seal, the date of manufacture, or the mood of the maker.
- Longer writing, such as essays, articles, poems, etc.

With this style words (relatively short ones) engraved on the surfaces sometimes are more specifically called bian kuan (Chinese: 邊款/边款; literally "side words") or bian zhu (Chinese: 邊注/边注; literally "side notations" or "side remarks").

If there's a whole poem or essay engraved on the side surfaces of a seal it is sometimes called ti ke (Chinese: 題刻/题刻), or shi ke (Chinese: 詩刻/诗刻; literally "poem-engraving").

To engrave Chinese characters you also need the experience of practicing calligraphy along with engraving.

Some artists also engrave a whole volume or volumes into the surfaces of a seal, like the complete Analects of Confucius.

=== With pictorial elements ===
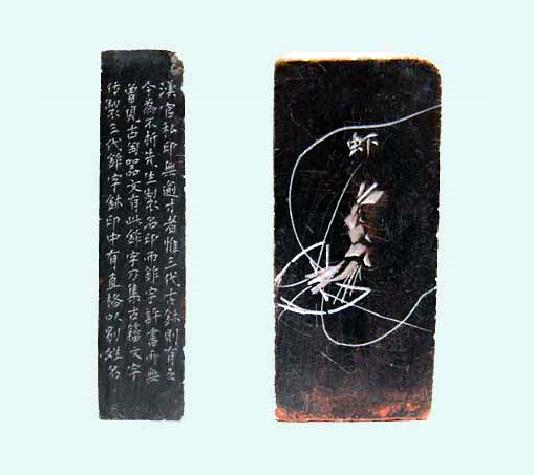
Side-engraving of a seal, including an essay and a picture of swimming shrimp

- Engrave a whole picture into the surfaces of a seal

When a shanshui style painting is engraved into the surfaces of the seal it is called bian jing (Chinese: 邊景/边景; literally "side landscapes" or "side views").

When a pattern of grasses, flowers, birds, or insects (usually "bird-and-flower painting") is engraved, it is called bian xiaopin (Chinese: 邊小品/边小品; literally "side small views" or "side small sketch").

To engrave a picture onto the surfaces of a seal an artist needs experience in both painting and engraving.

== Collecting ==
Rubbings of a seals' side-engraving are also collected. This kind of collecting first emerged in the Ming dynasty among artists and scholars.

== Notable artists ==
- Deng Shiru
- Wu Changshuo
- Zhao Zhiqian
- Sha Menghai

== See also ==
- Seal carving: the art on the bottom surface of a seal.
- Knob carving: the art on the top part of a seal.
- Seal script: the script of characters generally used in seal making.
- Seal (East Asia): Asian seal art in general.
- Engraved gem: the equivalent in Near Eastern and European art.
