= Zhao Zhiqian =

- 赵之谦
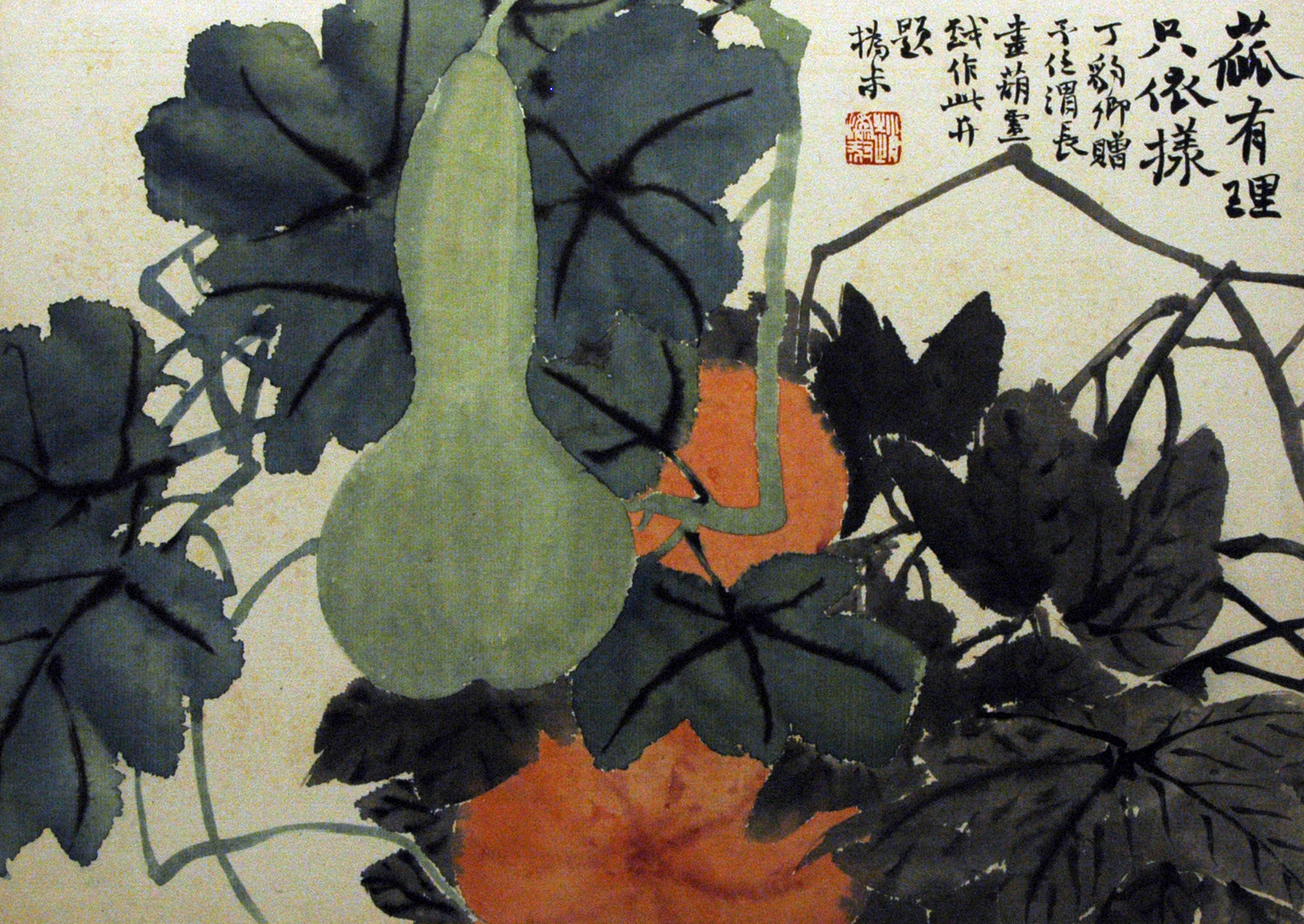
- A leaf from Zhao Zhiqian's album, Flowers, completed in 1859.
- Born: 1829; Shaoxing, Zhejiang Province, Qing dynasty
- Died: 1884 (age 56)
- Other names: Yifu (益甫), Lengjun (冷君), Huishu (撝叔), Bei'an (悲盦)
- Occupation(s): Calligrapher, seal carver, painter, scholar

Academic work
- Notable works: Yonglu Xianjie
- Influenced: Wu Changshuo, Qi Baishi

Zhao Zhiqian (Chinese: 赵之谦; 1829–1884) was a Chinese calligrapher, seal carver and painter in the late Qing Dynasty, "the leading scholar-artist of his day." Zhao's seal carving had profound influence on the later masters, such as Wu Changshuo and Qi Baishi. He is also known under the courtesy name of Yifu (益甫) and his pseudonym (hào) of Lengjun (冷君), which he changed to Huishu (撝叔) and Bei'an (悲盦) respectively later in his life.

== Biography ==
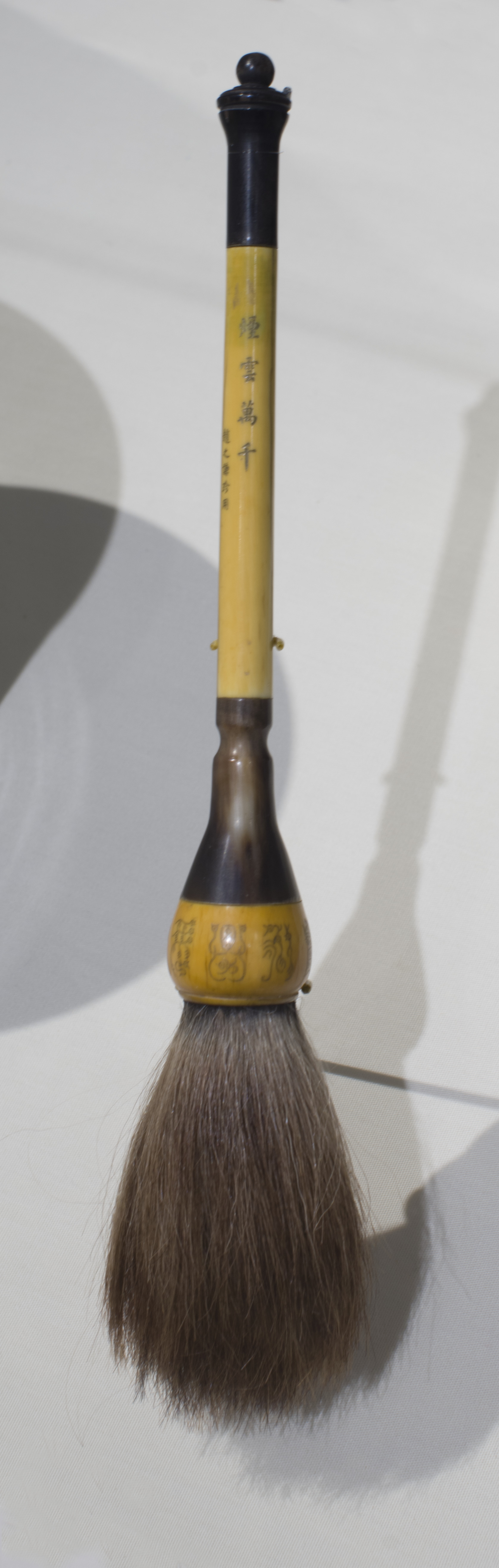
A brush of Zhao Zhiqian

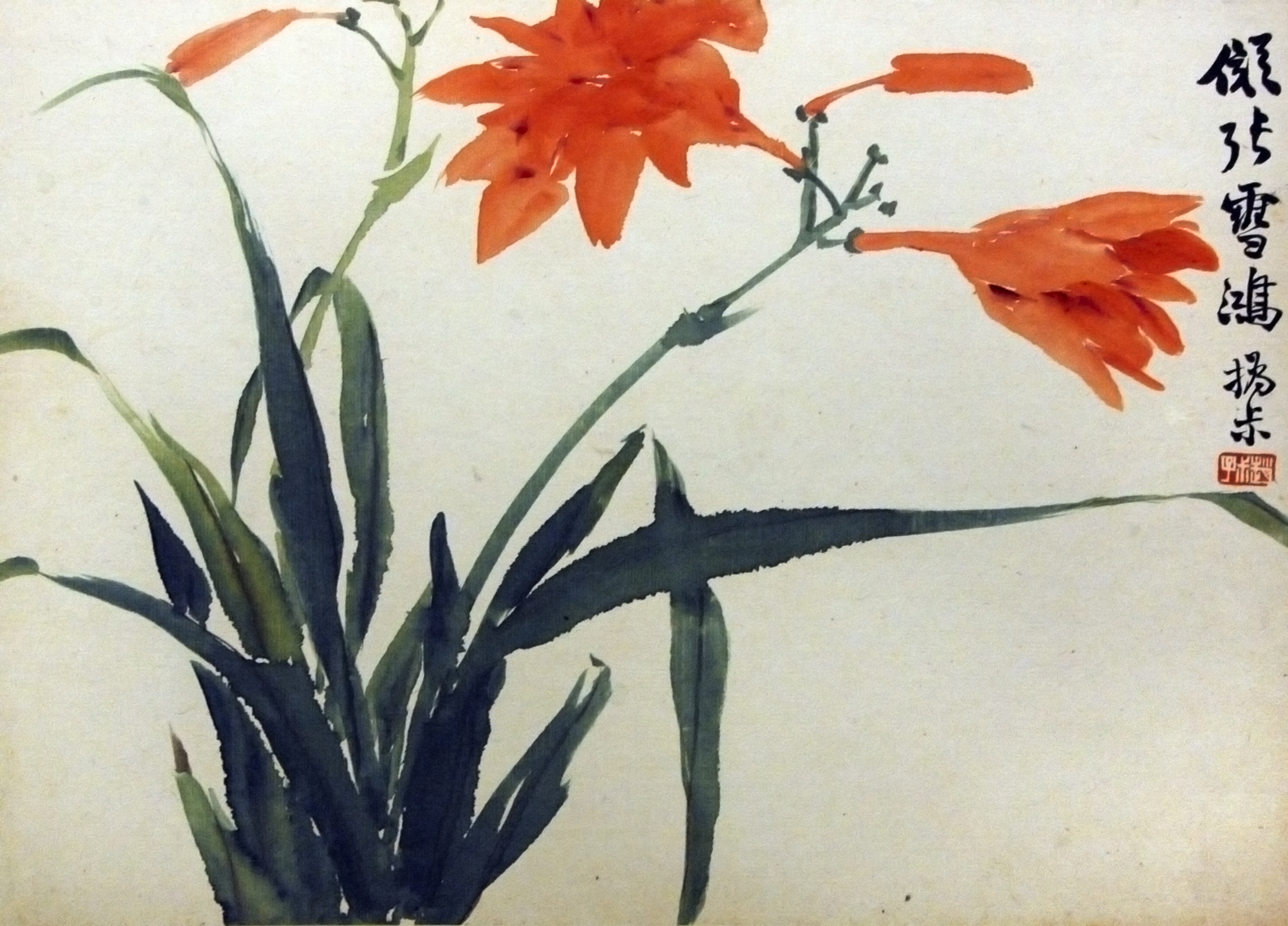
Hemerocallis, from the same album, 1859

Zhao was born in 1829 in Shaoxing, Zhejiang Province into a merchant family. He became a Xiucai at the age of 20, and obtained the title Juren in 1859 in Zhejiang provincial exam. With the outbreak of Taiping Rebellion in the following year, his political ambition was hindered. During the rebellion, his family shattered, and a number of his art works as well as his collections were lost. Later, he went to Beijing for the national exams. After repeated failures, he gave up his dream of becoming a government official. He submitted a request to become an alternative governor of a county in Jiangxi Province. He was remarried at 46, and had offspring.

Zhao's studio name was Yangshi qianyibaishijiu he zhai congsu, which may be translated as "The Studio where, looking upwards, 1,729 Cranes have been Observed". His written works include the first Chinese study of snuff-taking, entitled Yonglu Xianjie, or "Researches done during Spare Time into the Realm of Yonglu, God of the Nose", an English language translation of which by Richard Lynn can be found in the 1991 Autumn edition of the Journal of the International Chinese Snuff Bottle Society. He was also author and chief editor of the Jiangxi Tongzhi, the Gazetteer of Jiangxi, published in the 7th year of the Guangxu reign (1881).

Zhao died in 1884 at the age of 56.
