= Xiling Seal Engravers' Society =

Chinese art association based in Hangzhou, China

Coordinates: 30°15′11″N 120°08′07″E

- Chinese: 西泠印社
- Hanyu Pinyin: Xīlíng Yìnshè

The Xiling Seal Engravers' Society (Chinese: 西泠印社) is a Chinese arts organisation based in Hangzhou, Zhejiang Province, PRC. It was founded in 1904 but, with antecedents dating back to the Ming and Qing dynasties, is one of China's most important traditional stone seal engraving associations.

== Alternative names ==
Other possible translations include the 'Xiling Seal Art Society', 'Xiling Seal Society', 'Hsi-ling Seal Society', 'Xiling Seal Engraving Society'.

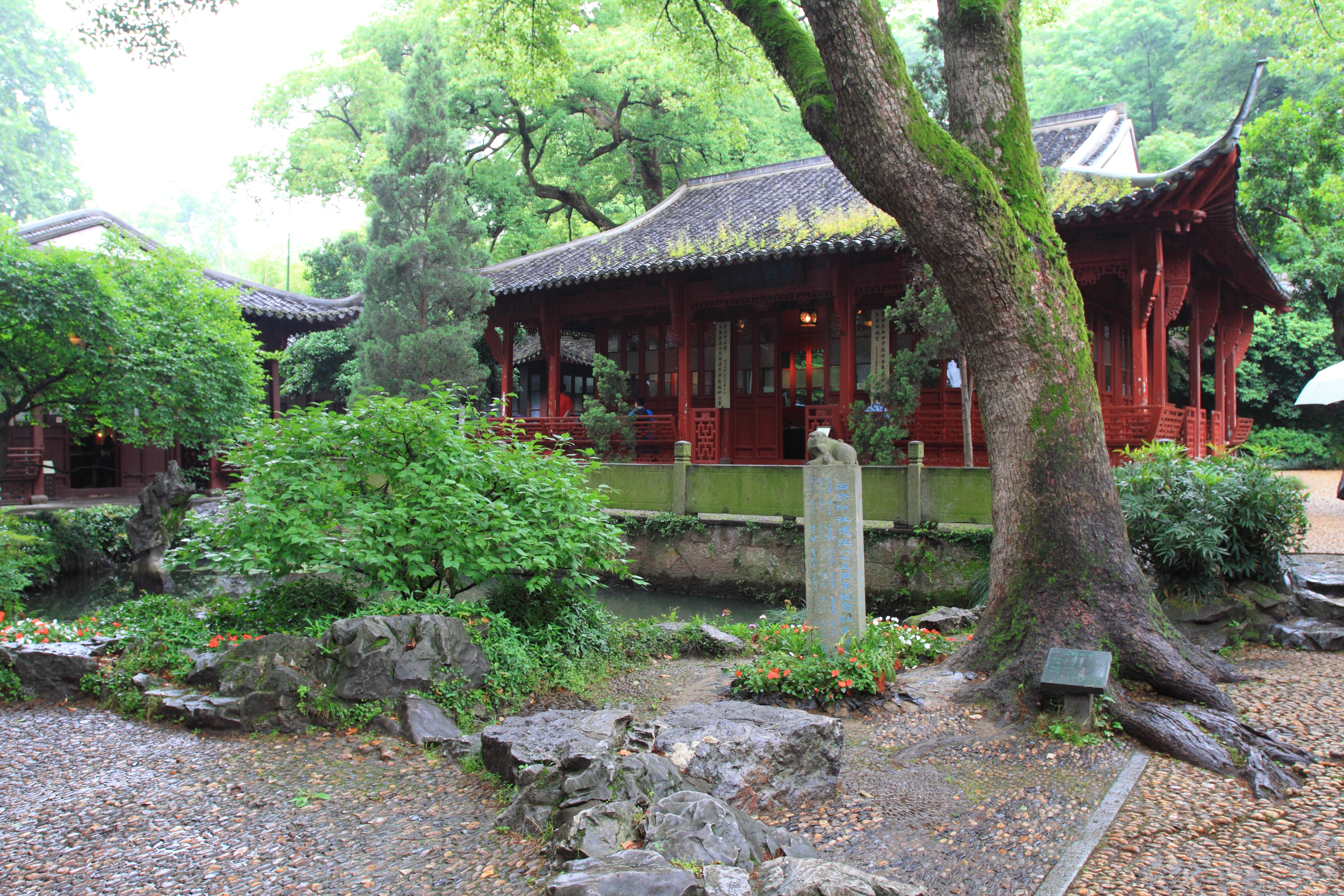

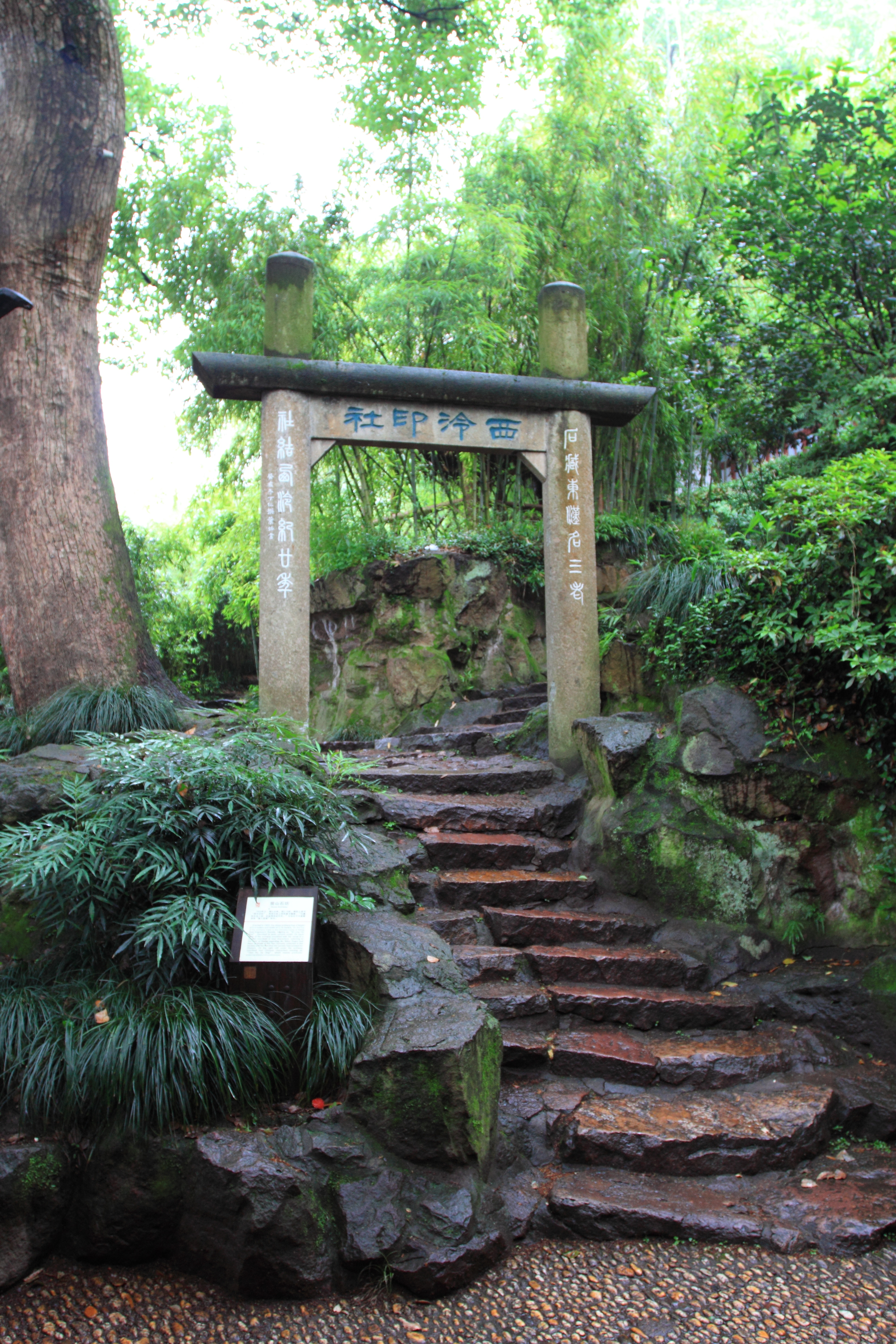

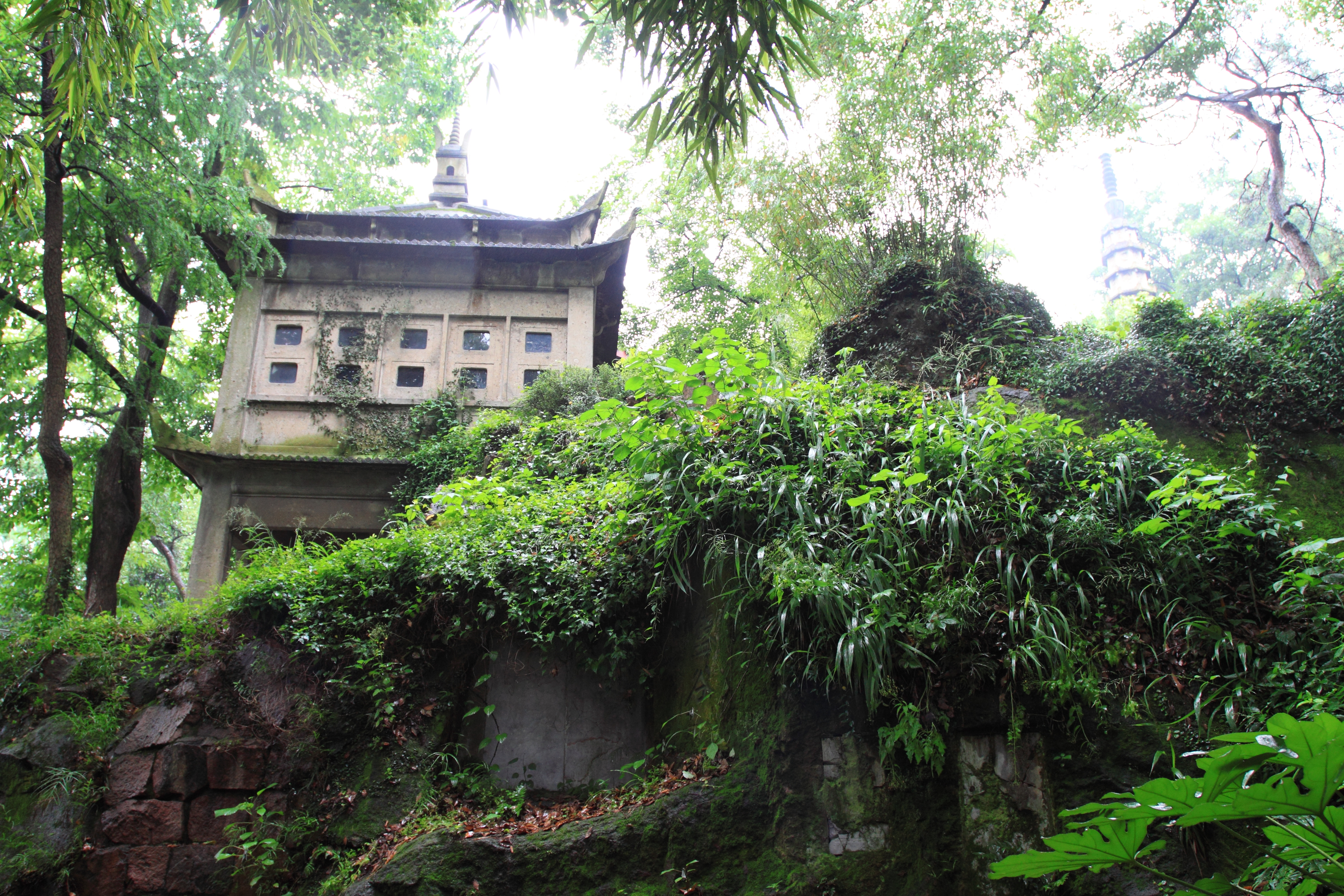

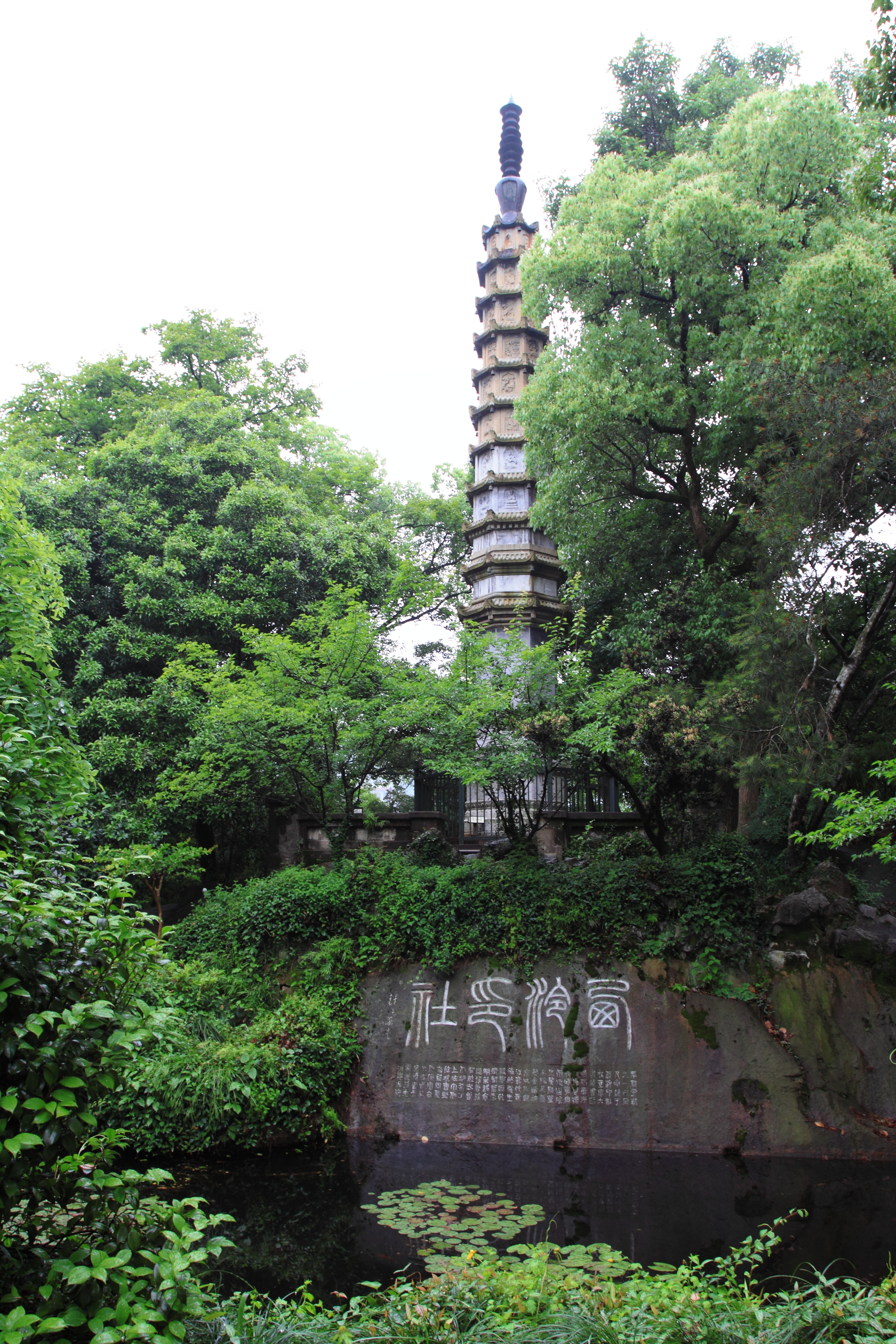

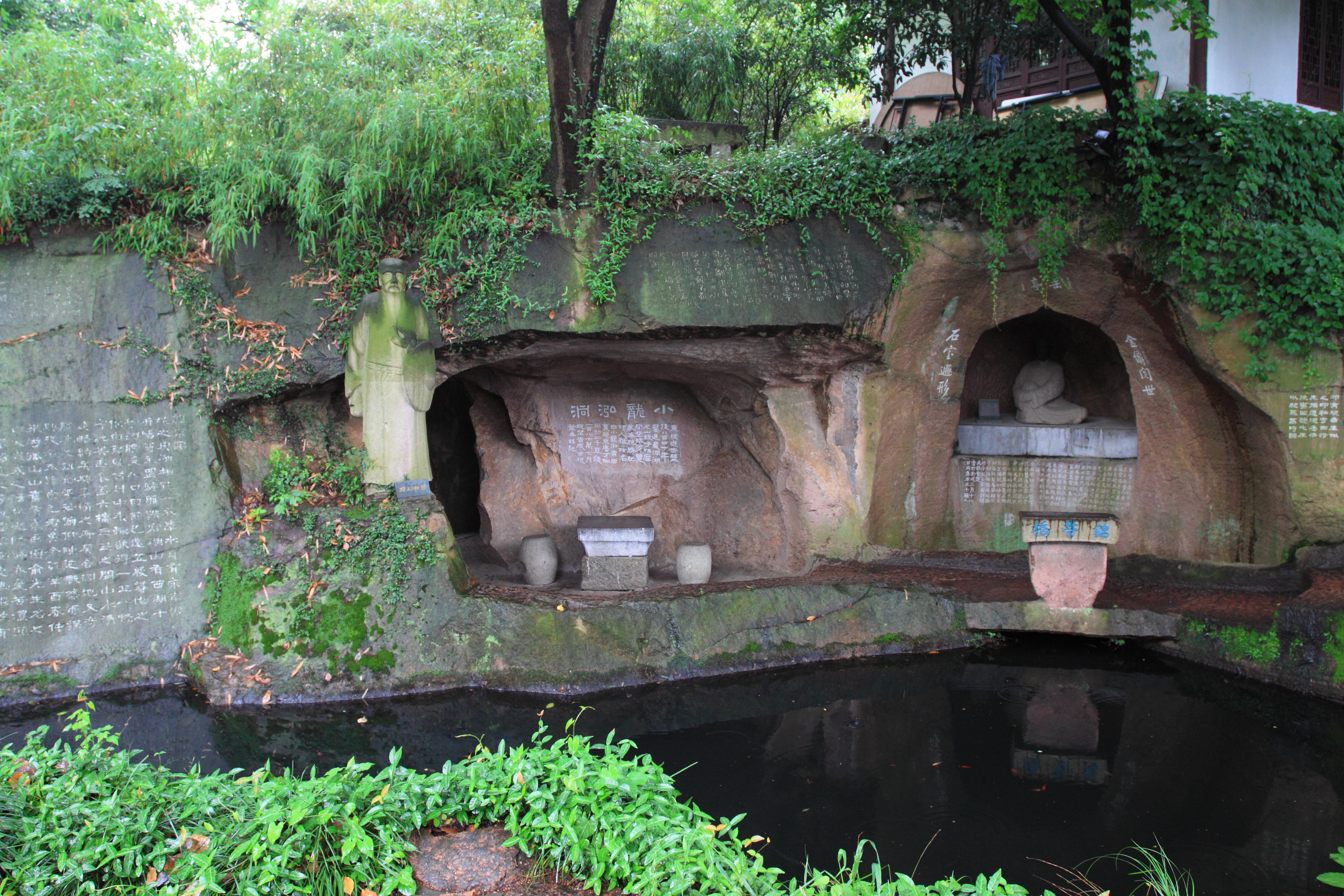

== See also ==
- Epigraphy
- Seal (East Asia)
- Seal carving
- Seal script
- Seal sculpture
