= Tingting =

Tingting (Chinese: 婷婷) is a feminine name of Chinese origin that may refer to:

- Jiang Tingting (born 1986), Chinese synchronised swimmer
- Liu Tingting (gymnast) (born 2000), Chinese gymnast
- Liu Tingting (hammer thrower) (born 1990), Chinese hammer thrower
- Liu Tingting (rower) (born 1990), Chinese rower
- Shao Tingting (born 1985), Chinese basketball player
- Huang Tingting (born 1992), Chinese idol singer
- Zhao Tingting (born 1982), Chinese badminton player
- Tingting Cojuangco (born 1944), Filipino politician
- TingTing Han (born 1979), Chinese oil painter also known as Han JinYu
- Ting-Ting Hu (born 1979), English-born Taiwanese actress

== See also ==
- Typhoon Tingting, storm around Guam in 2004
- The Ting Tings, English indie rock band
- Ting Ting, 2010 single by Alexandra Stan from Saxobeats
