= Jinyu (given name) =

Jinyu is a transliteration of multiple Chinese given names. Notable people with these names include:

- Han JinYu (born 1979), Chinese painter
- Li Jinyu (born 1977), Chinese footballer and coach
- Jinyu Liu (born 1972), Chinese classicist
- Zhong Jinyu (born 1983), Chinese footballer
