= Seals in the Sinosphere =

Seal
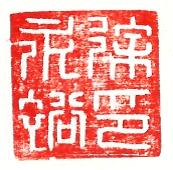
- 徐永裕印 Xú Yǒngyù yìn, rotating characters meaning "Seal of Xú Yǒngyù")

Chinese name
- Traditional Chinese: 印鑑 or 圖章 or 印章
- Simplified Chinese: 印鉴 or 图章 or 印章
Transcriptions
Standard Mandarin
- Hanyu Pinyin: yìnjiàn or túzhāng or yìnzhāng
Gan
- Romanization: ingan or inzong
Yue: Cantonese
- Yale Romanization: yan gaam or tòuh jēung or yan jēung
- Jyutping: jan3 gaam3 or tou4 zoeng1 or jan3 zoeng1
Southern Min
- Hokkien POJ: ìn-kàm or tô͘-chiong / tô͘-chiang or ìn-chiong / ìn-chiang

Vietnamese name
- Vietnamese alphabet: ấn triện or ấn chương or ấn tín (Note: Seals in Vietnam have different names based on their function, namely Bảo (寶), Tỷ (璽), Ấn 印, Chương 章, Kim bảo tỷ 金寶璽, Quan phòng 關防, Đồ ký 圖記, Kiềm ký 鈐記, Tín ký 信記, Ấn Ký 印記, Trưởng ký 長記, and Ký 記.)
- Chữ Hán: 印篆 or 印章 or 印信

Korean name
- Hangul: 인감 or 도장 or 인장
- Hanja: 印鑑 or 圖章 or 印章
Transcriptions
- Revised Romanization: ingam or dojang or injang

Mongolian name
- Mongolian Cyrillic: Тамга
- Mongolian script: ᠲᠠᠮᠠᠭ᠎ᠠ
Transcriptions
- SASM/GNC: Tamag'a / Tamga

Japanese name
- Kanji: 印鑑 or 印章 or 判子
Transcriptions
- Romanization: inkan or inshō or hanko

Manchu name
- Manchu script: ᡩᠣᡵᠣᠨ
- Möllendorff: Doron

In the Sinosphere, seals (stamps) can be applied on objects to establish personal identification. They are commonly applied on items such as personal documents, office paperwork, contracts, and art. They are used similarly to signatures in the West. Unlike in the West, where wax seals are common, Sinosphere seals are used with ink.

Of Chinese origin, the process soon spread beyond China and across East and Southeast Asia. Various countries in these regions currently use a mixture of seals and hand signatures, and, increasingly, electronic signatures.

Chinese seals are typically made of stone, sometimes of metals, wood, bamboo, plastic, or ivory, and are typically used with red ink or cinnabar paste (Chinese: 朱砂; pinyin: zhūshā). The word 印 ("yìn" in Mandarin, "in" in Japanese and Korean, "ấn" and "in" in Vietnamese) specifically refers to the imprint created by the seal, as well as appearing in combination with other morphemes in words related to any printing, as in the word "印刷", "printing", pronounced "yìnshuā" in Mandarin, "insatsu" in Japanese. In the western world, Asian seals were traditionally known by traders as chop marks or simply chops, a term adapted from the Hindi chapa and the Malay cap, meaning stamp or rubber stamps.

In Japan, seals, referred to as inkan (印鑑) or hanko (判子), have historically been used to identify individuals involved in government and trading from ancient times. The Japanese emperors, shōguns, and samurai had their personal seals pressed onto edicts and other public documents to show authenticity and authority. Even today, Japanese citizens' companies regularly use name seals for the signing of a contract and other important paperwork.

== History ==
=== Origin legends and early history ===
Throughout Chinese history, seals have played an important part and are known to have been used both by government authorities and private individuals for thousands of years. The earliest known examples of seals in ancient China date to the Shang dynasty (c. 1600 – c. 1046 BC) and were discovered at archaeological sites at Anyang. However, how these ancient seals were used remains to be uncovered as it is only starting from the Spring and Autumn period (771–476 BC) of the Zhou dynasty (1046–256 BC) that there is an increase in the quantity of Chinese seals paired together with textual references to them. Until the end of the Warring States period (476 BC–221 BC), all seals were only known as xǐ (璽), regardless if they were used by government officials or in private use and regardless of any material used to make them.

During the Han dynasty (202–220 AD), an origin myth of the supposed first seal in Chinese history was recorded, this myth states that the first seal was given to the Yellow Emperor by a yellow dragon which had a chart on its back. According to another origin myth, the first seal was given to Emperor Yao by a fenghuang (a mythical bird) as he was sitting in a boat. In both of these origin legends, the gifting of the seal is a symbol that the Mandate of Heaven was conferred to its recipient. So when Tang, the first ruler of the Shang dynasty, overthrows the last tyrannical ruler of the (possibly mythical) Xia dynasty (presumed c. 2070 – c. 1600 BC), he seizes the royal seal from him to symbolically establish his power.

=== Imperial China ===
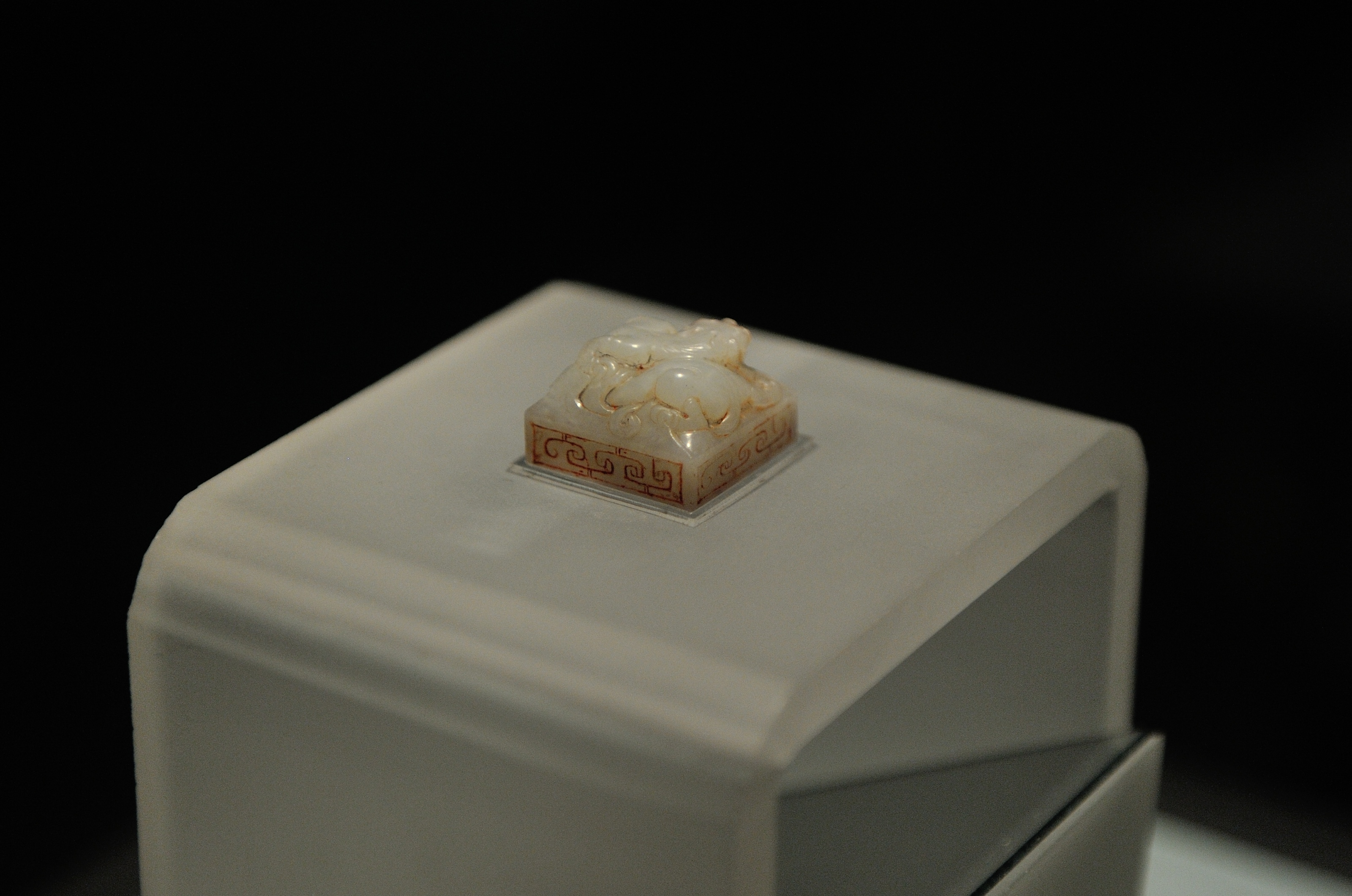
Jade Seal of the Empress, Western Han dynasty.

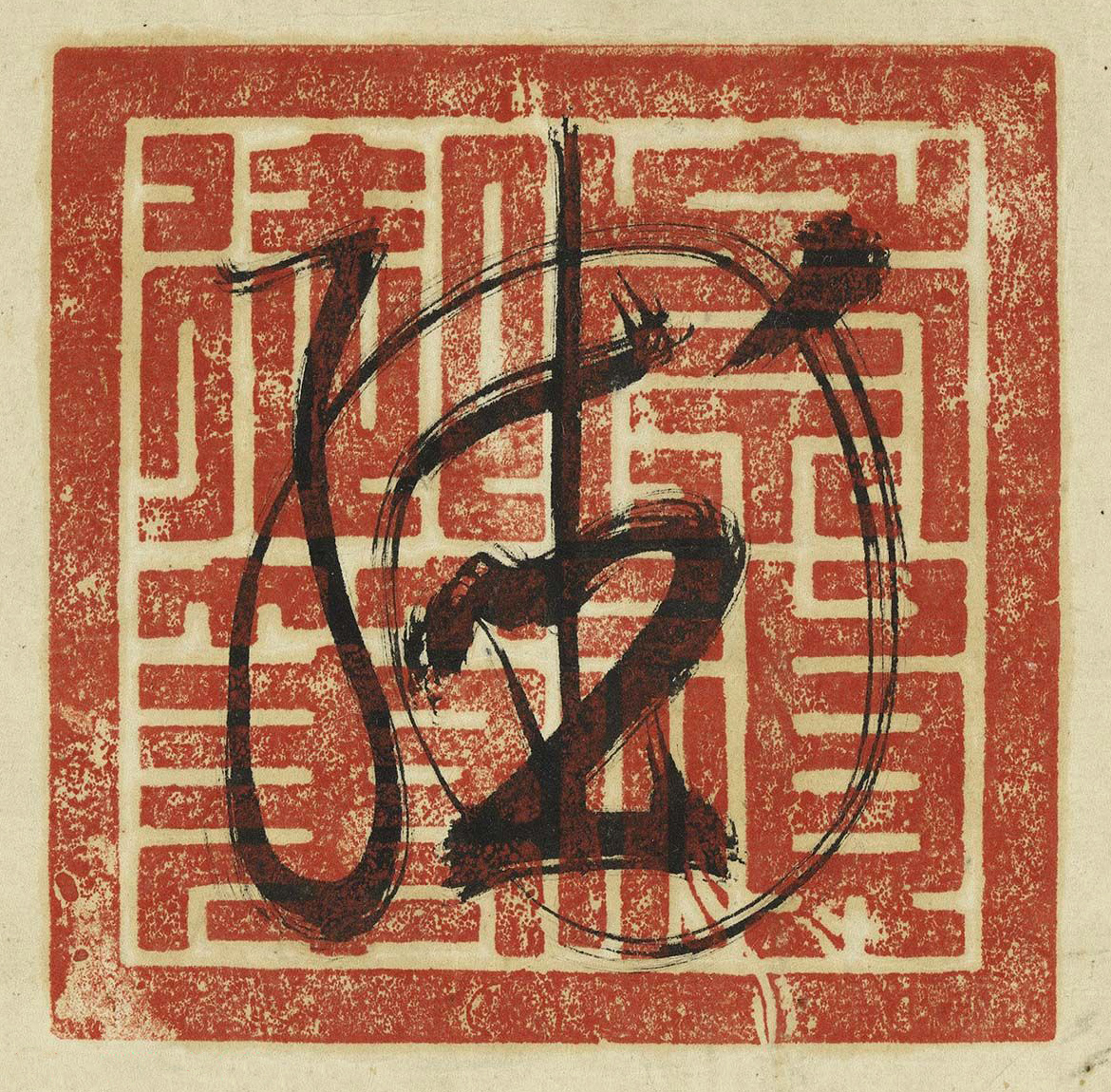
Personal seal and monogram (huaya) of the Chongzhen Emperor (1611–1644)

During China's Imperial Period, the term xǐ gradually began to become a designation exclusively reserved for the seals of the Emperors. During the Han dynasty, the Emperor of China only had 6 imperial seals, later during the Tang dynasty (618–907) this number had grown to 8, during the Ming dynasty (1368–1644) this number grew further to over a dozen imperial seals, and by the reign of the Qing dynasty (1644–1912), there were several dozen official imperial seals that were used by its Emperors. The inscriptions on these official imperial seals usually refer to either the Emperor receiving the Mandate of Heaven or to the Emperor being "the successor of Heaven".

According to The New Book of Tang, Empress Wu Zetian issued a decree that changed the usage of the word xǐ, which was up until then used for imperial seals, to treasure (寶; Bǎo). Her reasoning behind this change was that she thought that the word xǐ sounded too much like death (死; Sǐ) or rest (息; Xī). But when Emperor Zhongzong was resumed to the throne of the Tang dynasty in the year 705, he changed the name for imperial seals back to xǐ. In subsequent centuries both the terms xǐ and bǎo were alternated, depending on the period.

During the reign of the Mongol-led Yuan dynasty the main imperial seal bore the inscription "Seal in front of the Emperor" (御前之寶; Yùqián zhī bǎo), written in folded seal script and was found on the edicts of the Yuan emperors that have been preserved in Tibet. During the reign of the second Yuan emperor, Temür Khan, the Mongols claimed to have acquired the "Heirloom Seal of the Realm". They used it as a sign of their legitimacy; it continued to be used during the Northern Yuan dynasty period. During this period, a new so-called "Heirloom Seal of the Realm" emerged. However, this new seal was not the original one produced during the Qin dynasty, but a later-made seal created during the reign of Northern Yuan khagan Ligdan Khan during the early 17th century. The Mongols at the time knew that the Yuan dynasty emperors had a Chinese seal known at the "Heirloom Seal of the Realm" which they used to promote their legitimacy but were not in possession of the real seal, so Ligdan Khan created a new "Heirloom Seal of the Realm" modelled on the seals used by the Ming dynasty as a symbol of political legitimacy.

During the reign of Hong Taiji, the Jurchen-led Later Jin dynasty claimed to have acquired the Seal Transmitting the State from the Chahar Mongols; with this acquisition, the Jurchens claimed to have also acquired the mandate of heaven, but the imperial seal used by the Jurchens to stamp all their imperial documents bore the inscription "Seal of Edict" (制誥之寶; Zhì gào zhī bǎo), which was written in a type of seal script used by the Ming dynasty. The Qing dynasty continued to perpetuate this myth to legitimise their rule over China.

Another type of seal that was used by the Chinese Emperors was a seal to indicate that a certain text or official document was written in the Emperor's own handwriting as opposed to written by someone ordered to do so by the Emperor. In the case of the Qing dynasty period Qianlong Emperor, who was known for his literary ambitions, including his ability to write in well-renowned calligraphy, had produced a large amount of texts which were affixed with the seal to indicate that they were his own writing. When the calligraphy of the Qianlong Emperor was carved into stone steles, the print of the seal was also copied onto the stone surface.

== Engraving types ==
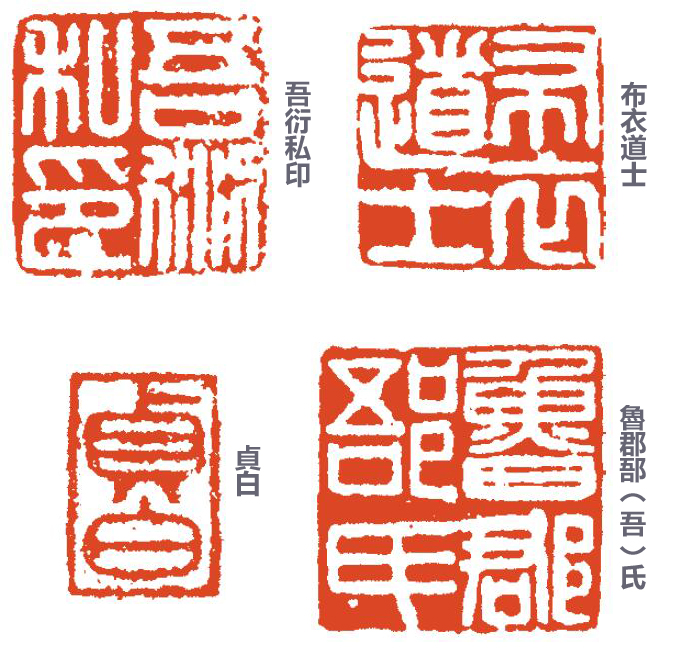
The seal works of Wu Qiuyan in Yuan dynasty

- Zhuwen (Chinese: 朱文; pinyin: zhūwén; Japanese pronunciation: shubun; lit. 'red characters') seals imprint the Chinese characters in red ink, sometimes referred to as yang seals.
- Baiwen (Chinese: 白文; pinyin: báiwén; Japanese pronunciation: hakubun; lit. 'white characters') seals imprint the background in red, leaving white characters, sometimes referred to as yin seals.
- Zhubaiwen Xiangjianyin (simplified Chinese: 朱白文相间印; traditional Chinese: 朱白文相間印; pinyin: zhūbáiwén xiāngjiàn yìn; lit. 'red-white characters combined seal') seals use zhuwen and baiwen together
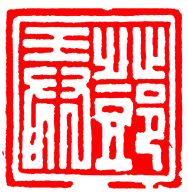
Baiwen seal

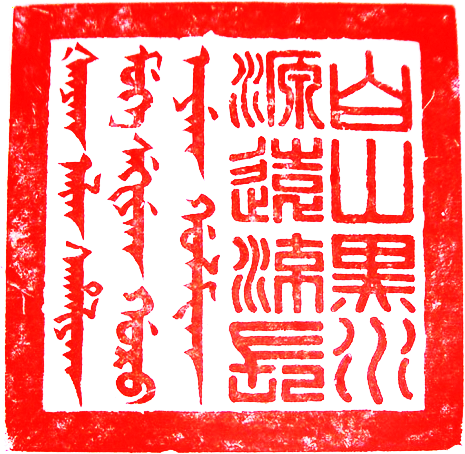
Zhuwen seal

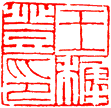
Zhubaiwen Xiangjianyin, quarterly: 1 and 4 with Zhuwen; 2 and 3 with Baiwen

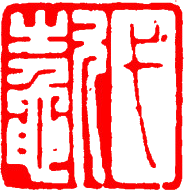
Zhuwen on right side, Baiwen on left side

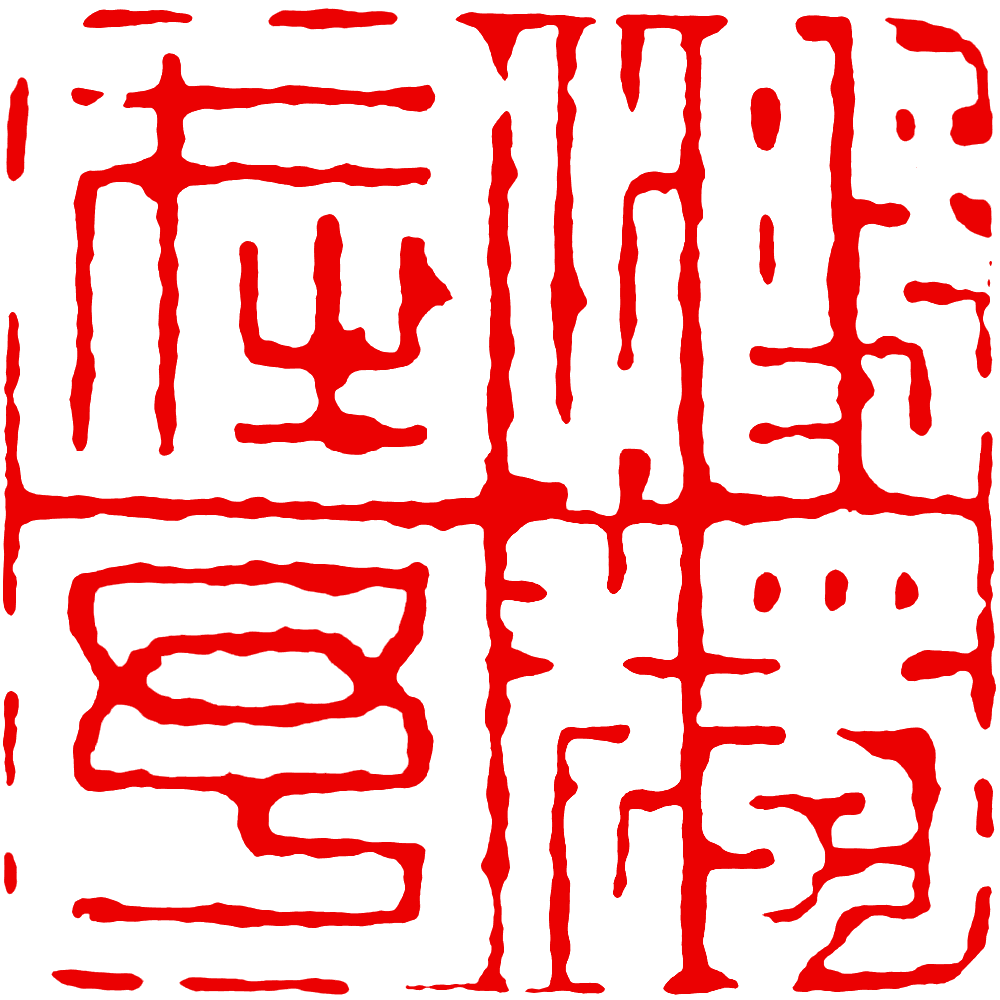
Baiwen on right side, Zhuwen on left side

== Government authorities ==
=== National government ===
The Heirloom Seal of the Realm from Imperial China (傳國璽; 传国玺; Chuánguóxǐ).

The Seal of the Emperor of the Great Ming (大明皇帝之寶; Dàmíng huángdì zhī bǎo)

The Chinese emperors, their families and officials used large seals known as xǐ (璽), later renamed bǎo (寶; 'treasure'), which corresponds to the great seals of Western countries. These were usually made of jade (although hard wood or precious metal could also be used), and were originally square in shape. They were changed to a rectangular form during the Song dynasty, but reverted to square during the Qing dynasty.

The most important of these seals was the Heirloom Seal of the Realm, which was created by the first Emperor of China, Qin Shi Huang, and was seen as a legitimising device embodying or symbolising the Mandate of Heaven. The Heirloom Seal was passed down through several dynasties, but had been lost by the beginning of the Ming dynasty. This partly explains the Qing emperors' obsession with creating numerous imperial seals – for the emperors' official use alone the Forbidden City in Beijing has a collection of 25 seals – in order to reduce the significance of the Heirloom Seal.

The authority of the government was often tied to their possession of certain seals. For example, when the Later Jin khanate proclaimed the Qing Empire, they only did so after receiving the jade seal from the Mongols. Likewise, the Northern Yuan before them claimed their legitimacy through their national seals as well.

These seals typically bore the titles of the offices, rather than the names of the owners. Different seals could be used for different purposes: for example, the Qianlong Emperor had a number of informal appreciation seals (Chinese: 乾隆御覽之寶; pinyin: Qiánlóng yùlǎn zhī bǎo; lit. 'Seal(s) for [use during] the Qiánlóng emperor's inspection') used on select paintings in his collection.

The most popular style of script for government seals in the imperial eras of China (from the Song dynasty to Qing dynasty) was the nine-fold seal script (九疊文; jiǔdiéwén), a highly stylised script which is unreadable to the untrained.

During its 143 years of existence, the government of the Nguyễn dynasty created more than 100 imperial seals. According to Dr. Phan Thanh Hải, Director of the Huế Monuments Conservation Centre, at the end of the Nguyễn dynasty period the Purple Forbidden City in Huế contained a total of 93 jade and gold seals of which 2 seals were from the Nguyễn lords period.

The government of the Republic of China in Taiwan has continued to use traditional square seals of up to about 13 centimetres, known by a variety of names depending on the user's hierarchy. Part of the inaugural ceremony for the President of the Republic of China includes bestowing on them the Seal of the Republic of China and the Seal of Honor.

In China, the Seal of the People's Government of the People's Republic of China was a square bronze seal with side length of 9 centimetres. Its inscription reads "Seal of the Central People's Government of the People's Republic of China". Notably, the seal uses the relatively modern Song typeface rather than the more ancient seal scripts, and the seal is called a yìn (印), not a xǐ (璽). Government seals in the People's Republic of China today are usually circular in shape, and have a five-pointed star in the centre of the circle. The name of the governmental institution is arranged around the star in a semicircle – a form also adopted by some company chops.

The official seal of National Taiwan University in Taiwan (國立臺灣大學印; Guólì Táiwān Dàxué yìn)

The Seal of the Republic of China (中華民國之璽; Zhōnghuá mīnguó zhī xǐ)

The Seal of the People's Government of the People's Republic of China (中华人民共和国中央人民政府之印; Zhōnghuá Rénmín Gònghéguó Zhōngyāng Rénmín Zhèngfǔ zhī yìn)

The seal of the president of the First Republic of Vietnam under Ngô Đình Diệm (1955–1963). Notice that its inscription is completely written in Latin script without diacritics.

=== Government officials ===
Government bureaucrats would receive office seals that served as a status token of both their office and authority. These government office seals tended to be small enough in size that they could be carried by the official on their belts. Unlike imperial seals and other seals of high office which were known as xi (Chinese: 璽; pinyin: Xǐ); lower seals of rank and appointment were known as yin (Chinese: 印; pinyin: Yìn).

Throughout history different regulations existed for these office seals that would prescribe what materials should be used (copper-alloys or gold) and how their seal knobs should be shaped (some with a handle in the shape of a turtle, some of a camel). Until the Eastern Han dynasty period government regulations stipulated that the ink used to affix official seals had their colours determined based in the rank of the official in question, with various colours such as green, purple, yellow, Etc.

Throughout Chinese history the calligraphy used for government office seals changed in radical ways. By the Han dynasty period the inscriptions of office seals tended to become thicker and more angular. From the Sui dynasty period the calligraphy had become more rounded and thinner than before, and later during the Song and Yuan dynasties periods the ''jiudie'' (Chinese: 九疊; pinyin: Jiǔ dié) (nine-folded) script was the preferred type of calligraphy. During the Qing dynasty period, most government office seals were bilingual with the Chinese (Seal script) inscription on the right side of the seal and the Manchu script inscription on its left.

== Personal ==
There are many classes of personal seals. Private seals are naturally unregulated; therefore they show the largest variety in content, shape, size, material, and calligraphy of any type of seal. Seals with names, pen names, pseudonyms, etc. on them were used as an early type of signature by people in their private lives. Artists would also sign their works and letters with their seals. Furthermore, Chinese literati are known to usually use a number of different pen names in their works, so trying to identify a person's name from a specific seal can be a tricky business.

=== Name (名印) ===
Denotes the person's name.

Name	Example text	Example seal	Use
Personal name seal (姓名印; Xingming Yin)	李小狼印, 李小狼	李小狼印 李小狼	State the personal name (family name and given name) of a person.
Style name seal (表字印; Biaozi Yin)	字矗昊, 矗昊	字矗昊 矗昊	State the style name of a person.
Subject concubine seal (臣妾印; Chenqie Yin)	臣小明 (male), 妾美櫻 (female)	臣小明 妾美櫻	Used in imperial times by imperial consorts or officials.
Simplified word seal (書簡印; Shujian Yin)	如佩信印	如佩信印	Used in letters, instead of writing well wishes by hand, the seal takes its place.
Rotating character seal (迴文印; Huiwen Yin)	李小狼印, 徐永裕印	李小狼印 徐永裕印	Same as the personal name seal, but characters are read in an anti-clockwise direction, rather than from the top-down, right-to-left. Sometimes used in writing (e.g. to sign a preface of a book).
General/combined seal (總印; Zong Yin)	大英伯明皇龍正之章	大英伯明皇龍正之章	States the personal name and the place name where he/she is from.
Governmental/official seal (官印; Guan Yin)	宜州管下羈縻都黎縣印	宜州管下羈縻都黎縣印	Seal of a department of the Government, or the leader of the department.
State seal (國璽; Guo Xi), imperial seal (帝璽; Di Xi)	大清帝國之璽, 文帝行璽	大清帝國之璽 文帝行璽	Seal of the realm or the monarch.

=== Free ===
A free seal (閑印) can contain the person's personal philosophy or literary inclination. These can be any shape, ranging from ovals to dragon-shaped.

Name	Example text	Example seal	Use
Portrait seal (肖形印; Xiaoxing Yin)	(Image of deer)	Lucky Deer	Has images with no words to express the user's character.
Lucky sayings seal (吉語印; Jiyu Yin)	日就富貴	日就富貴	Has lucky sayings and proverbs.
Exceeding seal of the Yellow God (黃神越章; Huangshen Yuezhang)	黃神越章天帝神之印	黃神越章天帝神之印	Used in ancient times as a protective charm on letters to shield the recipient from wild beasts or demons; now used mainly as a well-wishing convention on letters to people who travel abroad as well as a protective charm for the letter to be delivered safely to the recipient.
Sealing stamp (封泥; Feng Ni)	N/A	N/A	Used to seal letters or packages, often after the sealing tag/strip has been stuck on the flap.

=== Studio ===
A studio seal (齋印) carries the name of the person's private studio (書齋), which most literati in ancient China had, although probably in lesser forms. These are usually rectangular in shape.

Name	Example text	Example seal	Use
Studio/study seal (齋館印; Zhaiguan Yin)	雅目齋, 蘭雪堂	雅目齋 蘭雪堂	States the name of the studio or body. This includes society and company seals.
Alias seal (別號印; Biehao Yin)	白石道人, 白雲峰主	白石道人 白雲峰主	States aliases of the user, including artistic names, painting names and pen names.
Storage seal (收藏印; Shoucang Yin)	松雨彗齋圖書印, 儀徵張錫組珍藏書画	松雨彗齋圖書印 儀徵張錫組珍藏書画	Used on books or paintings that are kept by the user. This includes appreciation seals used on paintings and books that the owner admires. Serves a similar function to bookplates in the west.
Poetry seal (詞句印; Ciju Yin)	買魚沽酒答春晴, 問梅消息	買魚沽酒答春晴 問梅消息	Inscribed with a poem or proverb, used on paintings and suchlike. May be large or small, depending on length of inscription.
Signature Seal (花押印; Huaya Yin)	N/A	Shape of seal like Pipa Shape of seal like fish	A person's stylised signature. Often small, sometimes with images, the design can be varied in style.

== Art collectors' seals ==
In Imperial China, it was considered to be customary for collectors and connoisseurs of art to affix the print of their seals on the surface of a scroll of painting or calligraphy. Artists themselves often used their own seals on artworks, such as on works of Chinese calligraphy or Chinese paintings. Collector seals were chiefly used for the function of authenticating different pieces of art. Thus a collector seal identified to be of a famous art collector or connoisseur would become an integral part of an artwork itself and could substantially raise its monetary value on the Chinese art market. Thus in the course of several centuries, some Chinese paintings have become covered by a number of different seals of their different owners during the course of their existence.

The Emperors of China also had their own imperial seals to appraise and appreciate art. As such, many famous paintings from the Forbidden City in Beijing tend to have the imperial seals for art appraisal and appreciation of generations of subsequent emperors on them.

== Leisure seals ==
Many types of private seal not categorised above are usually categorised under the umbrella term "leisure seals". The inscription on leisure seals is usually a short text which is either a quote from a famous writing or just some saying that the owner of the seal thought is important. Typical inscriptions on leisure seals include "Respect fate", "Attain wisdom", "Respect", "Use loyalty and humanity in your affairs", among many others. Chinese leisure seals are comparable to Signature blocks with a quote at the end of an e-mail or internet messages where the author append some sort of proverb or saying that they consider valuable at the end.

== Seal paste ==
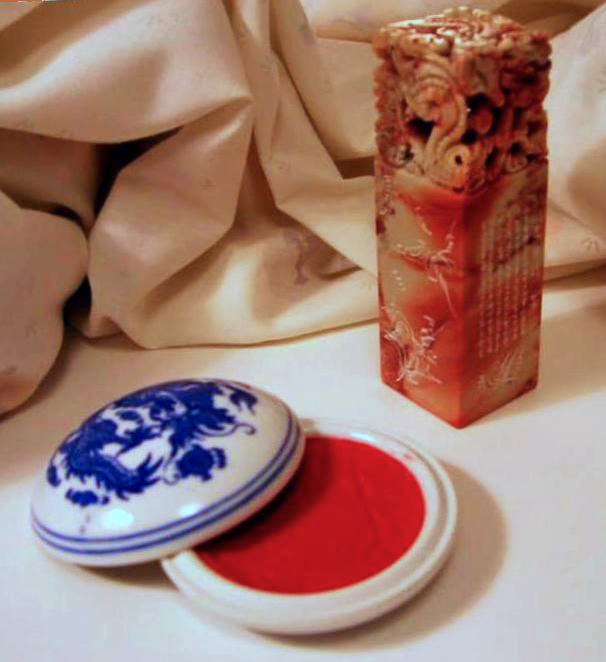
Chinese seal and red seal paste.

There are two types of seal paste (to make the impression) depending on what base material they are made of. The standard colour is vermilion red (or lighter or darker shades of red) but other colours can be used such as black, navy, etc. for specific purposes.

- Silk: The red paste is made from finely pulverized cinnabar, mixed with castor oil and silk strands. The silk strands bind the mixture together to form a very thick substance. It has a very oily appearance and tends to be a bright red in colour.
- Plant: The red paste is made from finely pulverized cinnabar, mixed with castor oil and moxa punk. Because the base is a plant one that has been pulverised, the texture is very loose due to the fact that it does not bind. The appearance is sponge like and not oily.

Plant-based paste tends to dry more quickly than silk-based pastes because the plant extract does not hold onto the oil as tightly as silk. Depending on the paper used, plant pastes can dry in 10 to 15 minutes. The more absorbent the paper is, the faster it dries as the paper absorbs most of the oil. Also, plant pastes tend to smudge more easily than silk pastes due to the loose binding agent.

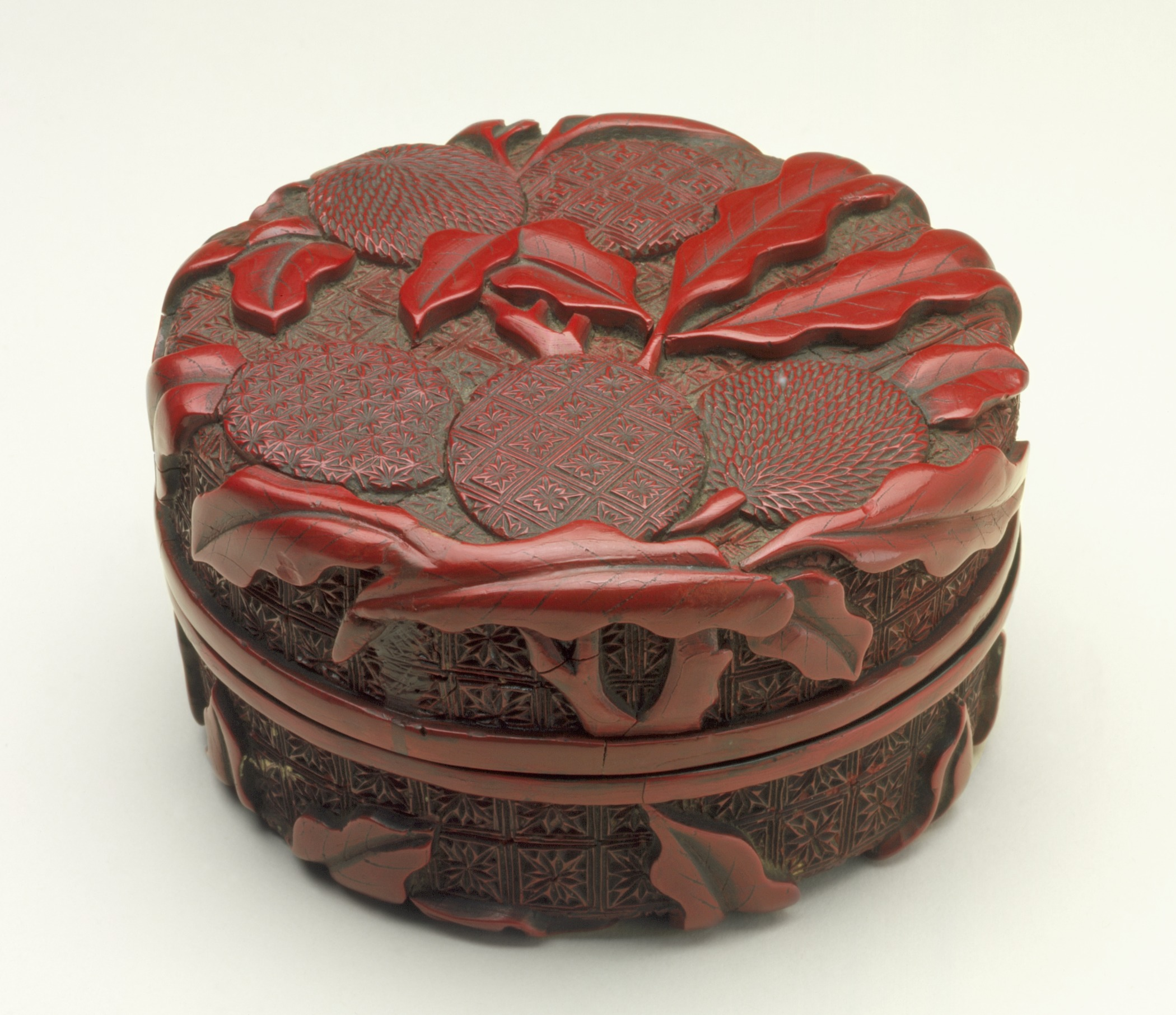
Yinnihe (seal paste box), Ming dynasty.

The paste is kept covered after it has been used, in its original container (be it plastic or ceramic). It is kept in an environment away from direct sunlight and away from intense heat to prevent it from drying out. The paste for silk based pastes need to be stirred with a spatula every month or so to avoid the oil sinking down and drying out the paste as well as to prepare it for use. A good paste would produce a clear impression in one go; if the impression is not clear requiring further impressions then it indicates that the paste is either too dry or the cinnabar has been depleted.

When the seal is pressed onto the printing surface, the procedure differs according to plant or silk based paste. For silk based paste, the user applies pressure, often with a specially made soft, flat surface beneath the paper. For plant based paste, the user simply applies light pressure. As lifting the seal vertically away from its imprint may rip or damage paper, the seal is usually lifted off one side at a time, as if bent off from the page. After this, the image may be blotted with a piece of paper to make it dry faster, although this may smudge it. Usually there needs to be a pile of soft felt or paper under the paper to be imprinted for a clear seal impression.

== Usage across the Sinosphere ==
=== Chinese usage ===
Scheme of Chinese seal, seal paste, and technique to use them.

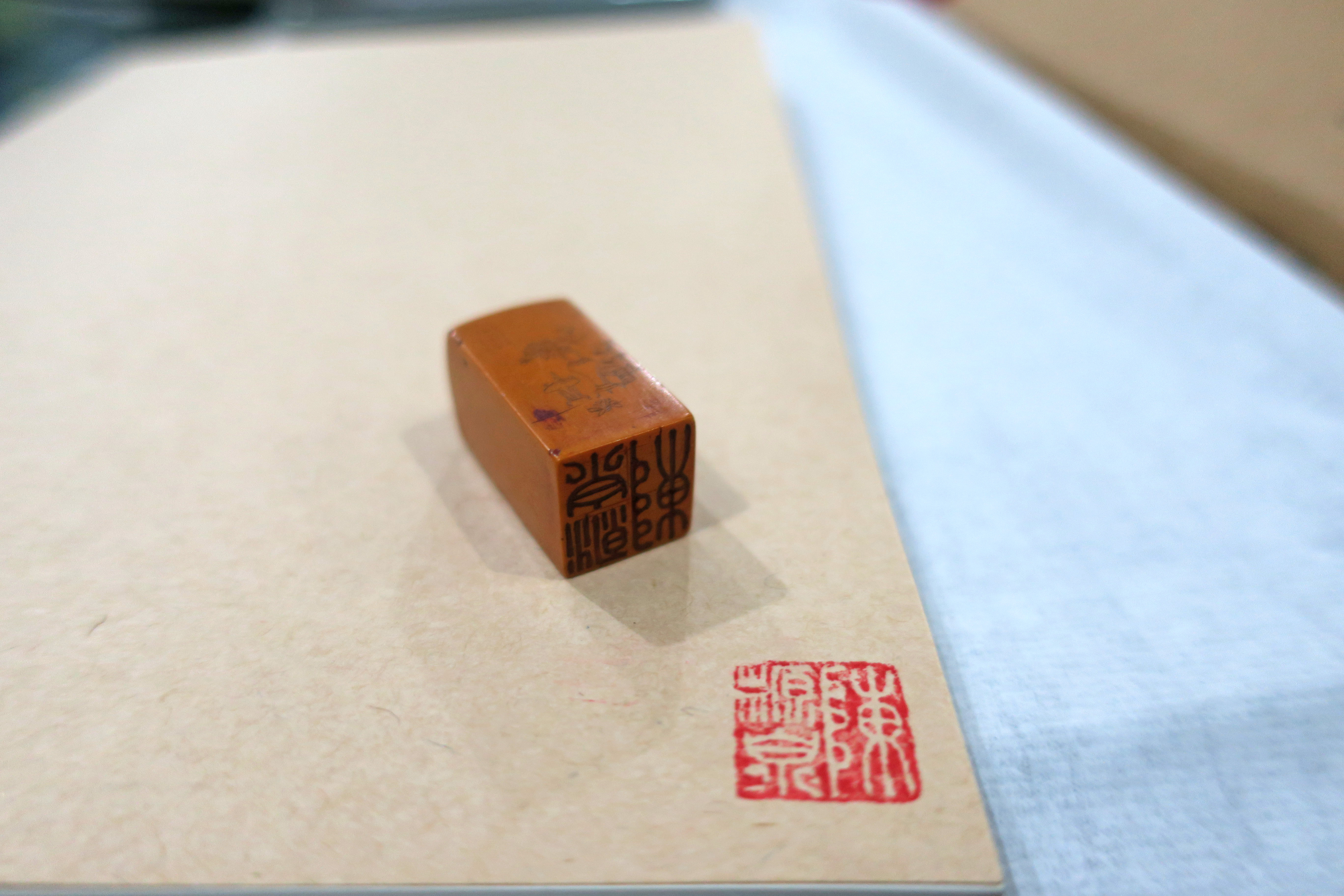
An East Asian seal which used to belong to a Chinese merchant in the 1930s and 40s

Many people in China possess a personal name seal. Artists, scholars, collectors and intellectuals may possess a full set of name seals, leisure seals, and studio seals. A well-made seal made from semi-precious stones can cost between 400 and 4000 yuan (about 60 to 600 United States dollars in 2021).

Seals are still used for official purposes in a number of contexts. When collecting parcels or registered post, the name seal serves as an identification, akin to a signature. In banks, traditionally the method of identification was also by a seal. Seals remain the customary form of identification on cheques in mainland China and Taiwan. Today, personal identification is often by a hand signature accompanied by a seal imprint. Seals can serve as identification with signatures because they are more difficult to forge than a signature, and only the owner has access to his or her own seal.

Seals are also often used on Chinese calligraphy works and Chinese paintings, usually imprinted in such works in the order (from top to bottom) of name seal, leisure seal(s), then studio seal. Owners or collectors of paintings or books will often add their own studio seals to pieces they have collected. This practice is an act of appreciation towards the work. Some artworks have had not only seals but inscriptions of the owner on them; for example, the Qianlong Emperor had as many as 20 different seals for use with inscriptions on paintings he collected. Provided that it is tastefully done (for example, not obscuring the body of the painting, appropriate inscription, fine calligraphy, etc.), this practice does not devalue the painting but could possibly enhance it by giving it further provenance, especially if it is a seal of a famous or celebrated individual who possessed the work at some point.

Seals are usually carved by specialist seal carvers, or by the users themselves. Specialist carvers carve the user's name into the stone in one of the standard scripts and styles described above, usually for a fee. Some people carve their own seals using soapstone and fine knives, which are widely available; this is cheaper than paying a professional for expertise, craft and material. Results vary, but individuals can carve perfectly legitimate seals for themselves.

As a novelty souvenir, seal carvers also ply tourist business at Chinatowns and tourist destinations in China. They often carve on-the-spot or translations of foreign names on inexpensive soapstone, sometimes featuring Roman characters.

Determining which side of the seal should face up may be done in a number of ways: if there is a carving on top, the front should face the user; if there is an inscription on the side, it should face to the left of the user; if there is a dot on the side, it should face away from the user.

Once seals are used, as much paste as possible is wiped from the printing surface and off the edges with a suitable material. The seals are kept in a constant environment, especially seals made of sandalwood or black ox horn. Tall thin seals are best kept on their sides, to prevent them from wobbling and falling down. More important seals, such as authority and society seals, are encased or wrapped in a golden silk cloth for protection.

==== Hong Kong ====
In Hong Kong, seals have fallen out of general use, as signatures are often required. In the past, seals were used by businesses on documents related to transactions. Seals have also been used in lieu of a signature for the city's illiterate population.

Lisa Lim of the South China Morning Post stated in 2016 that often Hong Kongers are asked to use the word "stamp" instead of chop in formal writing so non-Hong Kongers may understand.

=== Japanese usage ===
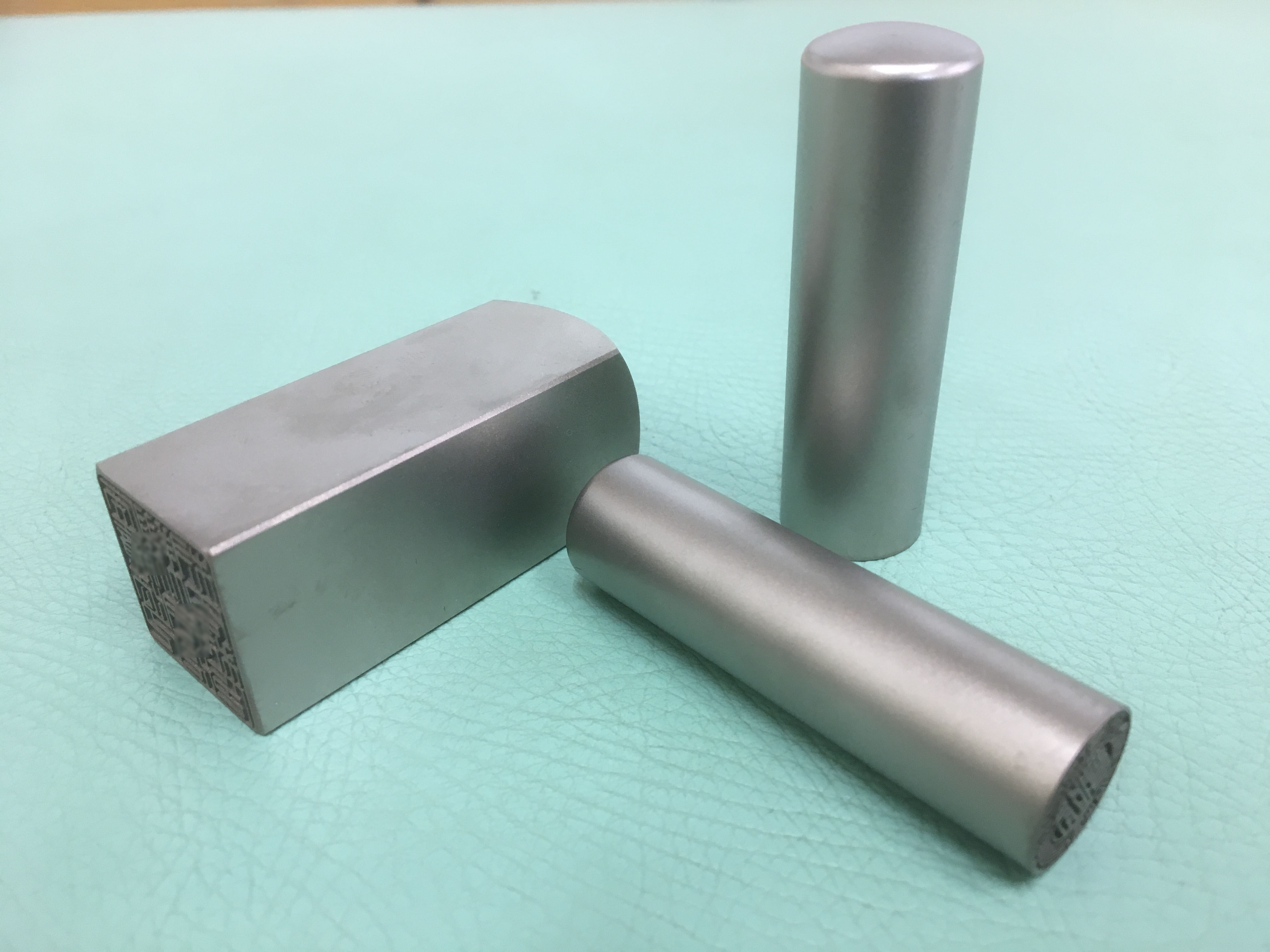
Titanium seals made in Japan: a square seal for corporations (left), a seal for bank accounts (bottom right), and a general use seal (top right).

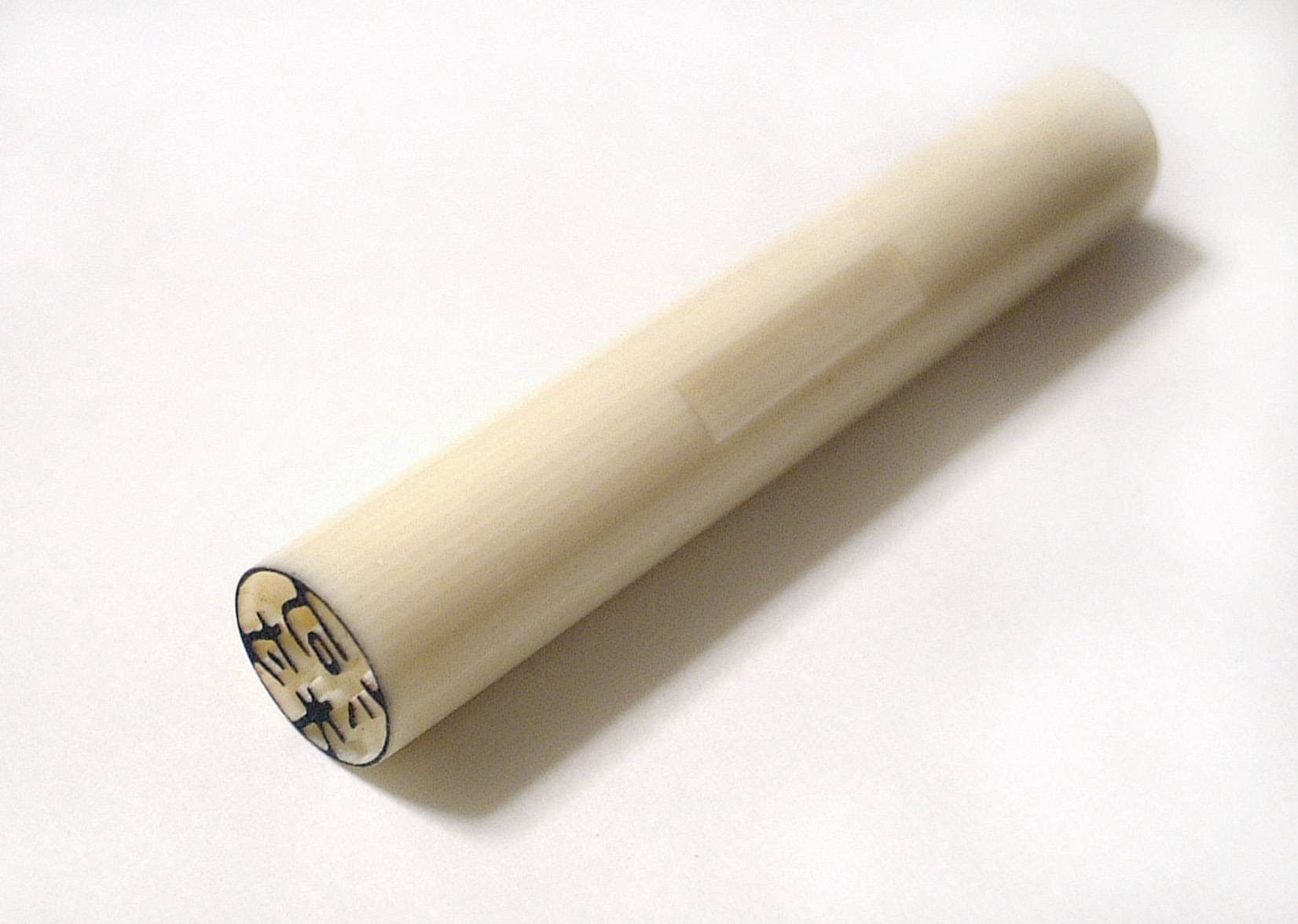
Ready-made inkan with the name "Kawamura" (河村).

In Japan, seals in general are referred to as inkan (印鑑) or hanko (判子). Inkan is the most comprehensive term; hanko tends to refer to seals used on less important documents.

The first evidence of writing in Japan is a hanko dating from AD 57, made of solid gold given to the ruler of Nakoku by Emperor Guangwu of Han, called King of Na gold seal. At first, only the Emperor and his most trusted vassals held hanko, as they were a symbol of the Emperor's authority. Noble people began using their own personal hanko after 750 AD, and samurai began using them at some time during the Feudal Period. Samurai were permitted exclusive use of red ink. Chinese style seals were also utilized by the Ryūkyū Kingdom. After modernization began in 1870, hanko came into general use throughout Japanese society.

Government offices and corporations usually have inkan specific to their bureau or company and follow the general rules outlined for jitsuin with the following exceptions. In size, they are comparatively large, measuring 2 to 4 inches (5.1 to 10.2 cm) across. Their handles are often ornately carved with friezes of mythical beasts or hand-carved hakubun inscriptions that might be quotes from literature, names and dates, or original poetry. The Privy Seal of Japan is an example; weighing over 3.55 kg and measuring 9.09 cm it is used for official purposes by the Emperor.

Some seals have been carved with square tunnels from handle to underside, so that a person can slide their inkan into the hollow, thus signing a document with both their name and the business's (or bureau's) name. These seals are usually stored in jitsuin-style boxes under high security except at official ceremonies, at which they are displayed on ornate stands or in their boxes.

The King of Na gold seal

Royal Seal of the Ryūkyū Kingdom.

The State Seal of Japan

The Privy Seal of Japan

For personal use, there are at least four kinds of seals. In order from most to least formal/official, they are jitsuin, ginkō-in, mitome-in, and gagō-in.

==== Jitsuin ====
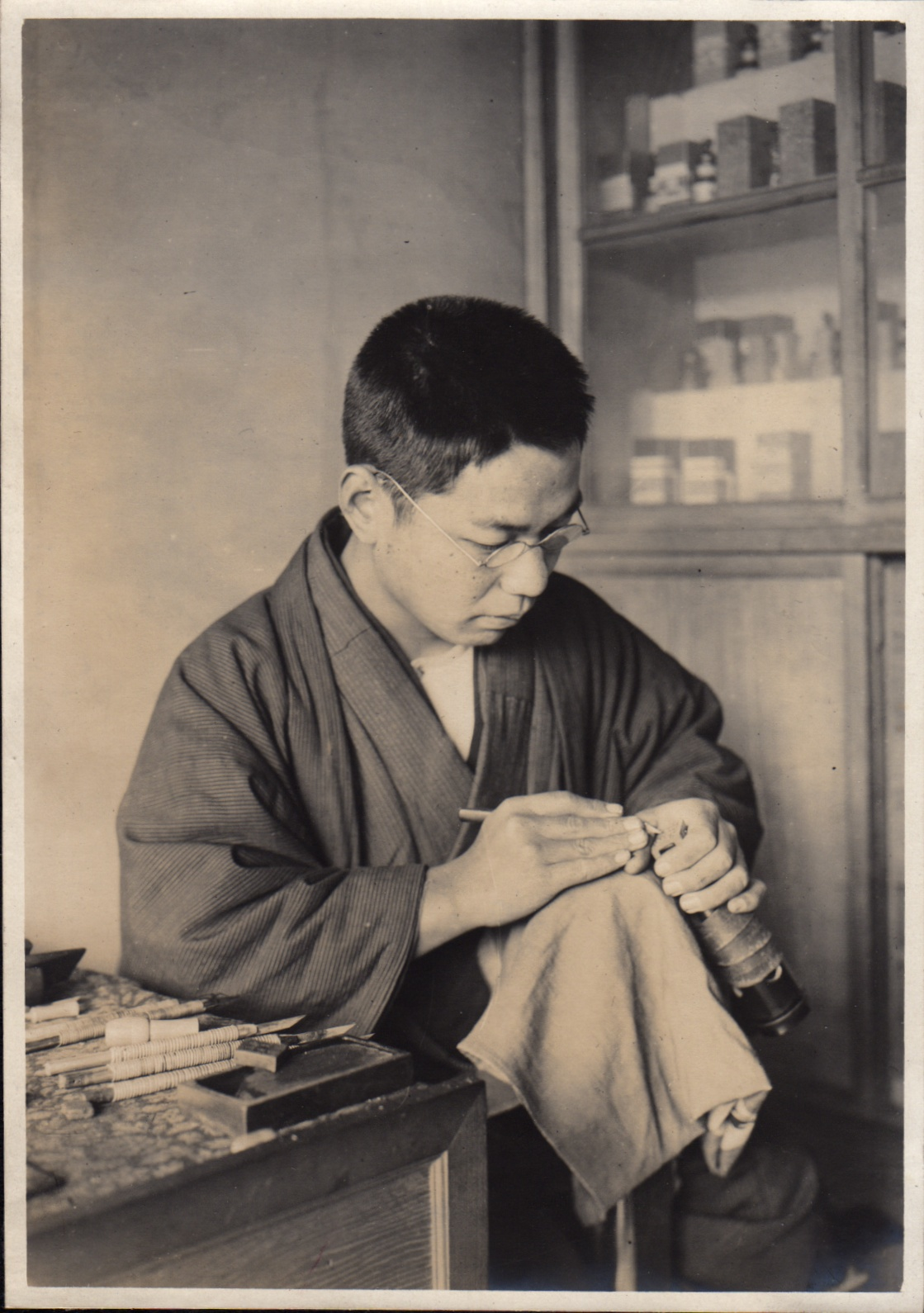
Man carving an ivory seal. Japan, 1915

A jitsuin (実印) is an officially registered seal. A registered seal is needed to conduct business and other important or legally binding events. A jitsuin is used when purchasing a vehicle, marrying, or purchasing land, for example.

The size, shape, material, decoration, and lettering style of jitsuin are closely regulated by law. For example, in Hiroshima, a jitsuin is expected to be roughly 1/2 to 1 inch (1.3 to 2.5 cm), usually square or (rarely) rectangular but never round, irregular, or oval. It must contain the individual's full family and given name, without abbreviation. The lettering must be red with a white background (shubun), with roughly equal width lines used throughout the name. The font must be one of several based on ancient historical lettering styles found in metal, woodcarving, and so on. Ancient forms of ideographs are commonplace. A red perimeter must entirely surround the name, and there should be no other decoration on the underside (working surface) of the seal. The top and sides (handle) of the seal may be decorated in any fashion from completely undecorated to historical animal motifs, dates, names, and inscriptions.

Throughout Japan, rules governing jitsuin design are very stringent and each design is unique, so many people hire a professional. Costs can range from $20–100 USD, and the seals can be used for decades. A new jitsuin is sometimes made after significant life changes, such as a divorce, death in the family, or a change in career.

The material is usually a high quality hard stone or, far less frequently, deerhorn, soapstone, or jade. It is sometimes carved by machine. When carved by hand, an intō ("seal-engraving blade"), a mirror, and a small specialized wooden vice are used. An intō is a flat-bladed pencil-sized chisel, usually round or octagonal in cross-section and sometimes wrapped in string to give a better grip. The intō is held vertically in one hand, with the point projecting from the carver's fist on the side opposite the thumb. New, modern intō range in price from less than US$1 to US$100.

The jitsuin are kept in secure places such as bank vaults, or are hidden in a home. They are usually stored in thumb-sized rectangular boxes made of cardboard covered with embroidered green fabric outside and red silk or red velvet inside, held closed by a white plastic or deerhorn splinter tied to the lid and passed through a fabric loop attached to the lower half of the box. Because of the superficial resemblance to coffins, they are often called "coffins" in Japanese by enthusiasts and hanko boutiques. The paste is usually stored separately.

==== Ginkō-in ====
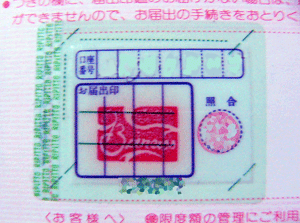
A foreigner's ginkō-in displayed in a savings passbook. Note the boundary limiting its size to 1.0 cm × 1.5 cm (0.39 in × 0.59 in) and extreme freedom in design.

A ginkō-in (銀行印) is used specifically for banking; ginkō means "bank". A person's savings account passbook contains an original impression of the ginkō-in alongside a bank employee's seal. Rules for the size and design vary somewhat from bank to bank; generally, they contain a Japanese person's full name. A Westerner may be permitted to use a full family name with or without an abbreviated given name, such as "Smith", "Bill Smith", "W Smith" or "Wm Smith" in place of "William Smith". The lettering can be red or white, in any font, and with artistic decoration.

Since mass-produced ginkō-in offer no security, most people either have them custom-made by professionals or make their own by hand. They were traditionally made of wood or stone; more recently of ivory, plastic or metal, and carried in a variety of thumb-shape and -size cases resembling cloth purses or plastic pencil cases. They are usually hidden carefully in the owner's home.

Banks always provide stamp pads or ink paste, and dry cleaning tissues. The banks also provide small plastic scrubbing surfaces similar to small patches of red artificial grass. These are attached to counters and used to scrub the accumulated ink paste from the working surface of customers' seals.

==== Mitome-in ====
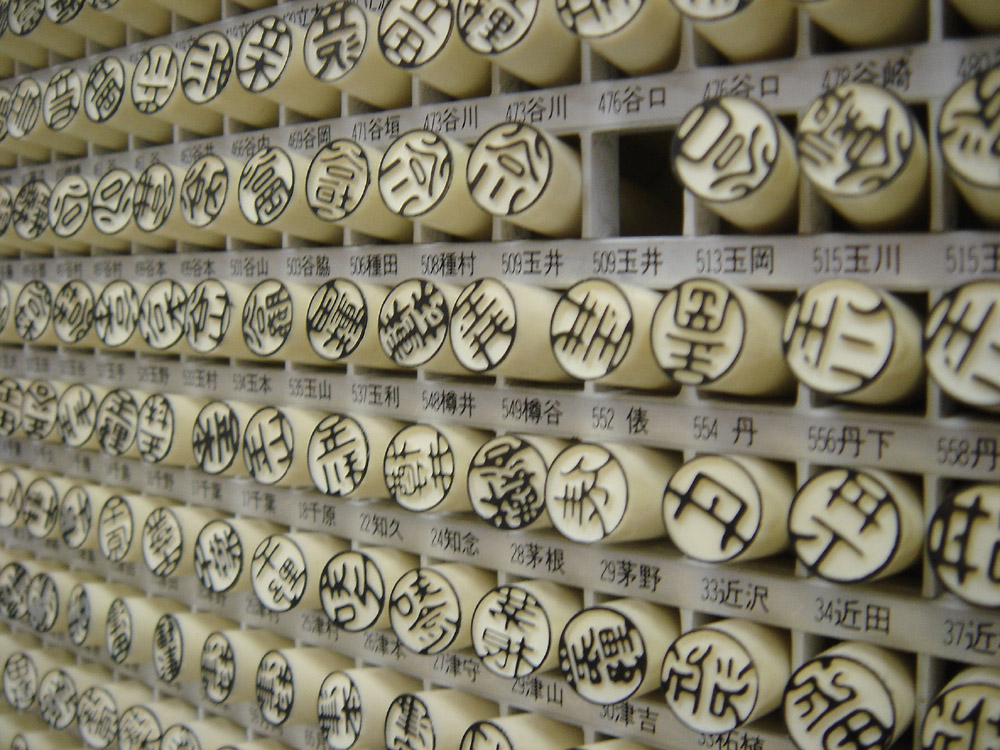
Off-the-shelf Hanko (sanmonban)

A mitome-in (認印) is a moderately formal seal typically used for signing for postal deliveries, signing utility bill payments, signing internal company memos, confirming receipt of internal company mail, and other low-security everyday functions.

Mitome-in are commonly stored in low-security, high-utility places such as office desk drawers and in the anteroom (genkan) of a residence.

A mitome-ins form is governed by fewer customs than jitsuin and ginkō-in. However, mitome-in adhere to a handful of strongly observed customs. The size is the attribute most strongly governed by social custom. It is usually not more than 20 millimetres (0.79 in) in size. A man's is usually slightly larger than a woman's, and a junior employee's is always smaller than his bosses' and his senior co-workers', in keeping with office social hierarchy. The mitome-in always has the person's family name and usually does not have the person's given name (shita no namae). Mitome-ins are often round or oval, but square ones are not uncommon, and rectangular ones are not unheard-of; irregular shapes are not used. They can produce red lettering on a blank field (shubun) or the opposite (hakubun). Borderlines around their edges are optional.

Plastic mitome-in in popular Japanese names can be obtained from stationery stores for less than US$1, though ones made from inexpensive stone are also very popular. Inexpensive prefabricated seals are called sanmonban (三文判). Rubber stamps are unacceptable for business purposes.

Mitome-in and lesser seals are usually stored in inexpensive plastic cases, sometimes with small supplies of red paste or a stamp pad included.

Most Japanese also have a less formal seal used to sign personal letters or initial changes in documents; this is referred to by the broadly generic term hanko. They often display only a single hiragana, kanji ideograph, or katakana character carved in it. They are as often round or oval as they are square. They vary in size from 0.5 to 1.5 centimetres (0.20 to 0.59 in) wide; women's tend to be small.

==== Gagō-in ====
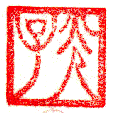
A modern gagō-in spelling out "Mitsuko" (光子), a popular woman's name. Note the uniform line widths, archaic text style, and right-to-left direction.

Gagō-in (雅号印) are used by graphic artists to both decorate and sign their work. The practice goes back several hundred years. The signatures are frequently pen names or nicknames; the decorations are usually favorite slogans or other extremely short phrases. A gagō in can be any size, design, or shape. Irregular naturally occurring outlines and handles, as though a river stone were cut in two, are commonplace. The material may be anything, though in modern times soft stone is the most common and metal is rare.

Traditionally, inkan and hanko are engraved on the end of a finger-length stick of stone, wood, bone, or ivory, with a diameter between 25 and 75 millimetres (0.98 and 2.95 in). Their carving is a form of calligraphic art. Foreign names may be carved in rōmaji, katakana, hiragana, or kanji. Inkan for standard Japanese names may be purchased prefabricated.

Almost every stationery store, discount store, large book store, and department store carries small do-it-yourself kits for making hanko. These include instructions, hiragana fonts written forward and in mirror-writing (as required on the working surface of a seal), a slim in tou chisel, two or three grades of sandpaper, slim marker pen (to draw the design on the stone), and one to three mottled, inexpensive, soft square green finger-size stones.

In modern Japan, most people have several inkan.

A certificate of authenticity is required for any hanko used in a significant business transaction. Registration and certification of an inkan may be obtained in a local municipal office (e.g., city hall). There, a person receives a "certificate of seal impression" known as inkan tōroku shōmei-sho (印鑑登録証明書).

The increasing ease with which modern technology allows hanko fraud is beginning to cause some concern that the present system will not be able to survive.

Signatures are not used for most transactions, but in some cases, such as signing a cell phone contract, they may be used, sometimes in addition to a stamp from a mitome-in. For these transactions, a jitsuin is too official, while a mitome-in alone is insufficient, and thus signatures are used.

==== Discouragement ====
During 2020, the Japanese government has been attempting to discourage the use of seals, because the practice requires generation of paper documents that interfere with electronic record-keeping and slow digital communications. The delay has been most pressing in infectious disease reporting during the COVID-19 pandemic: officials found it took up to three days between a case of COVID-19 being discovered and it being reported to the public. Japanese prime minister Yoshihide Suga had set the digitalization of the bureaucracy and ultimately of Japan's entire society as a key priority. He aimed to establish a new digital agency to put the idea into practice. Ministries were urged to end hanko requirements for 785 types of procedure, 96% of the total, including tax documents. Most business people favoured discontinuing hanko, but half considered that it would be difficult to do so. Politicians also opposed discontinuing their regional hand-carved hanko—a "symbol of Japan".

=== Korean usage ===
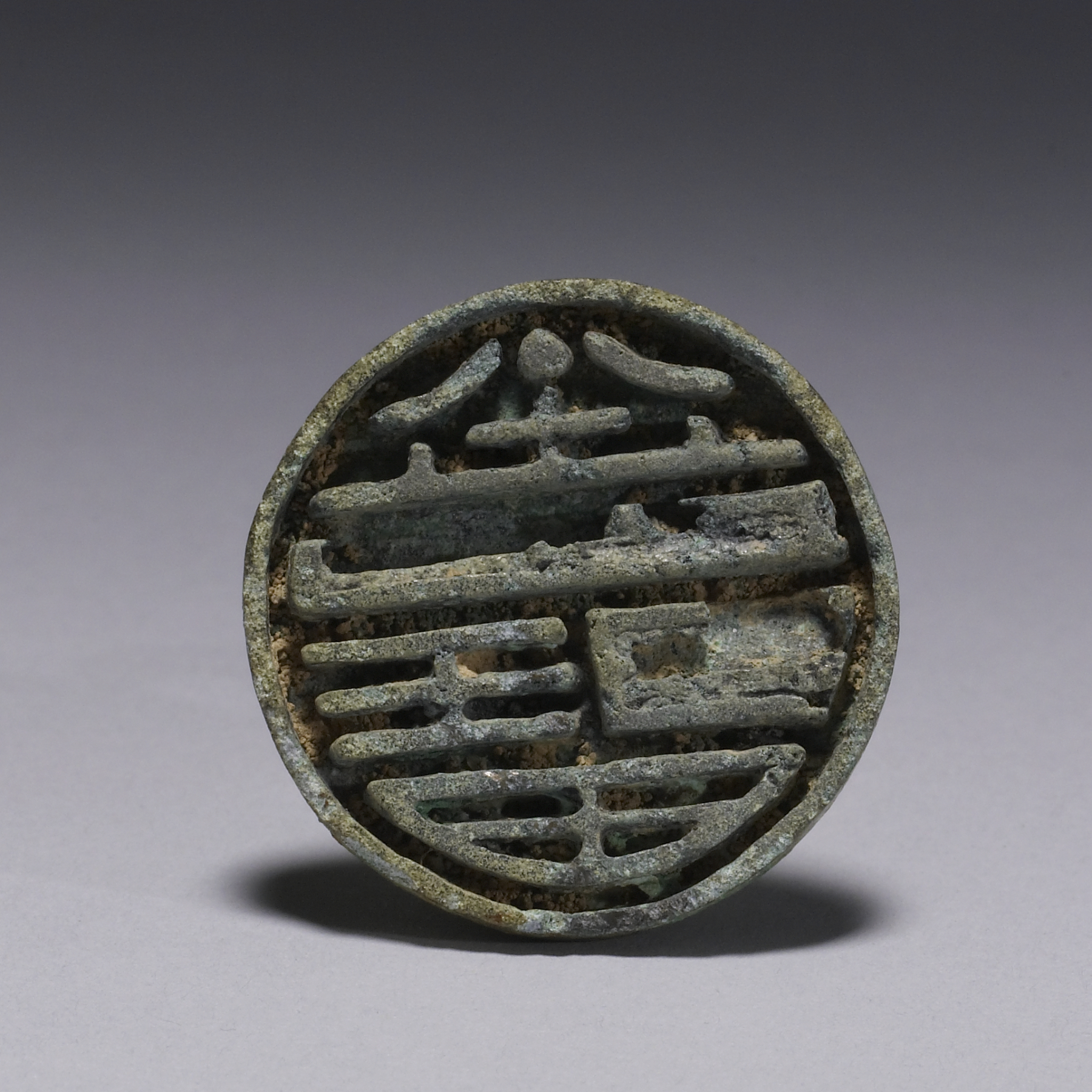
Bronze Korean seal, dated between 935 and 1392

The seal was first introduced to Korea in approximately 2nd century BC. The remaining oldest record of its usage in Korea is that kings of Buyeo used a royal seal (oksae; Korean: 옥새; Hanja: 玉璽) which bore the inscription of Seal of the King of Ye (예왕지인; 濊王之印). The use of seals became popular during the Three Kingdoms of Korea period.

In the case of State Seals in monarchic Korea, there were two types in use: Gugin (국인, 國印) which was conferred by the Emperor of China to Korean kings, with the intent of keeping relations between two countries as brothers (Sadae). This was used only in communications with China and for the coronation of kings. Others, generally called eobo (어보, 御寶) or eosae (어새, 御璽), are used in foreign communications with countries other than China, and for domestic uses. Seals were also used by government officials in documents. These types of seals were called gwanin (관인, 官印) and it was supervised by specialist officials. With the declaration of establishment of Republic of Korea in 1948, its government created a new State Seal, guksae (국새, 國璽) and it is used in promulgation of constitution, designation of cabinet members and ambassadors, conference of national orders and important diplomatic documents.

Seals are still commonly used in South Korea. Most Koreans have personal seals, and every government agency and commercial corporation has its own seals to use in public documents. While signing is also accepted, many Koreans think it is more formal to use seals in public documents. In 2008, the Constitutional Court of South Korea upheld a Supreme court judgement that a signed handwritten will without a registered seal was invalid. Korean seals are made of wood, jade, or sometimes ivory for more value. State Seals were generally made of gold or high-quality jade. There are rare cases of bronze or steel seals.

==== Personal seals ====
Personal seals (Korean: 도장; RR: dojang) in Korea can be classified by their legal status. Ingam (인감, 印鑑) or sirin (실인, 實印), meaning registered seal, is a seal which has been registered by a local office, attested by a "certificate of seal registration", (Korean: 인감증명서; Hanja: 印鑑證明書; RR: ingam-jungmyeong-seo) a document required for most significant business transactions and civil services.

The legal system of registered seals was introduced by the Japanese colonial government in 1914. While it was scheduled to be completely replaced by an electronic certification system in 2013 in order to counter fraud, as of 2021 ingam still remains an official means of verification for binding legal agreement and identification. The government passed the 'Act on Confirmation, etc. of Personal Signature (본인서명사실 확인 등에 관한 법률)' in 2012, which gives registered handwritten signatures the same legal effect as ingam.

While ingam is used on important business, other dojangs are used for everyday purposes, such as less-significant official transactions. Thus most Koreans have more than two seals.

In traditional arts, as in China and Japan, an artist of Chinese calligraphy and paintings would use seals (generally leisure seals and studio seals) to identify their work. These types of seals were called Nakkwan (낙관, 落款). As seal-carving was also considered a form of art, many artists carved their own seals. Seals of Joseon-period calligraphist and natural historian Kim Jung-hee (aka Wandang or Chusa) are considered to be antiques.

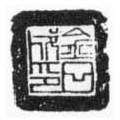
The Seal of Kim Il Sung, published in his autobiography With the Century

The seal of the People's Committee of North Korea

The Seal of the Republic of Korea

The first Seal of the Republic of Korea (1949–1962)

The Seal of the President of South Korea

Former seal of the President of South Korea (Hanja)

=== Mongolian usage ===
While Chinese-style seals are typically used in China, Japan, and Korea, they are occasionally used outside East Asia. For example, the rulers of the Ilkhanate, a Mongol khanate established by Hulagu Khan in Persia, used seals containing Chinese characters in their diplomatic letters, such as the letter from Arghun to French King Philip IV and the letter from Ghazan to Pope Boniface VIII. These seals were sent by the emperors of the Yuan dynasty, a Mongol-ruled dynasty of China, especially by Kublai Khan and his successor Emperor Chengzong. Other local, non-Mongol rulers, such as Jamaluddin Abu-Is'haq, the Injuid ruler of Shiraz, also had a chinese-style square seals, but with perso-arabic written on them. In that era, a specific script style called "Seal Kufic" was developed under the suzereignty of the Mongol Emperor.

Seal of Güyük Khan using the classical Mongolian script, as found in a letter sent to the Roman Pope Innocent IV in 1246

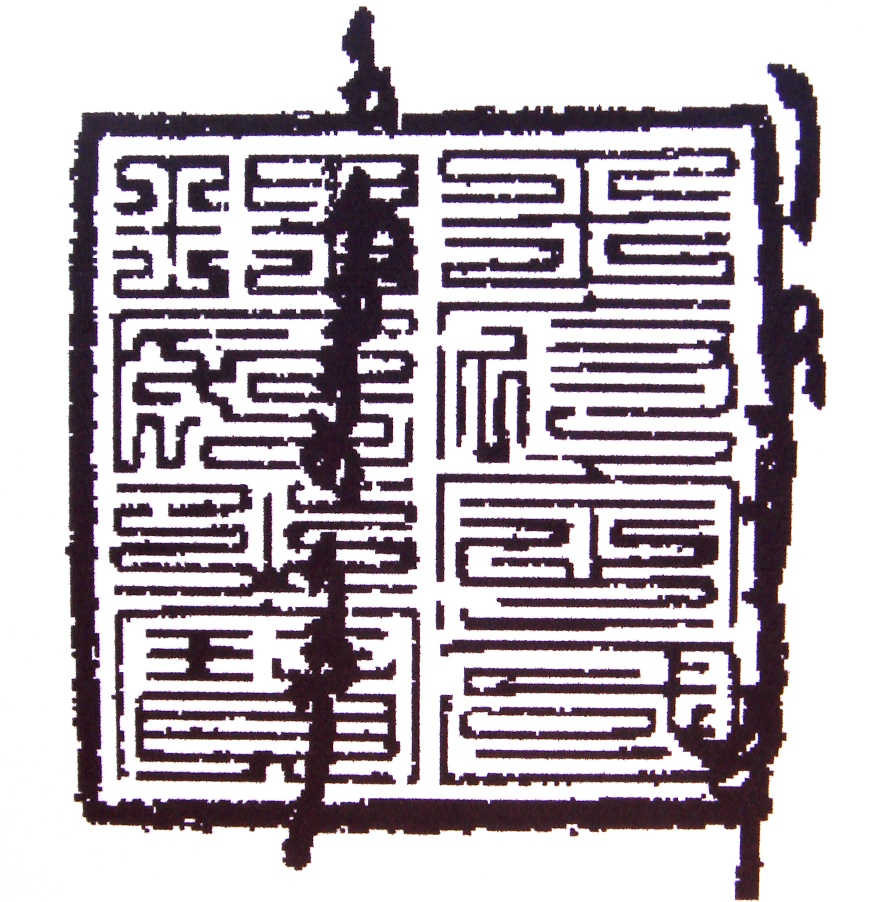
Seal of Ilkhan Ghazan, reading "王府定國理民之寶" in archaic "nine-fold" Chinese script, meaning "Seal certifying the authority of his Royal Highness to establish a country and govern its people"

The seal of the Bogd Khan of Mongolia

The state seal of Mongolia

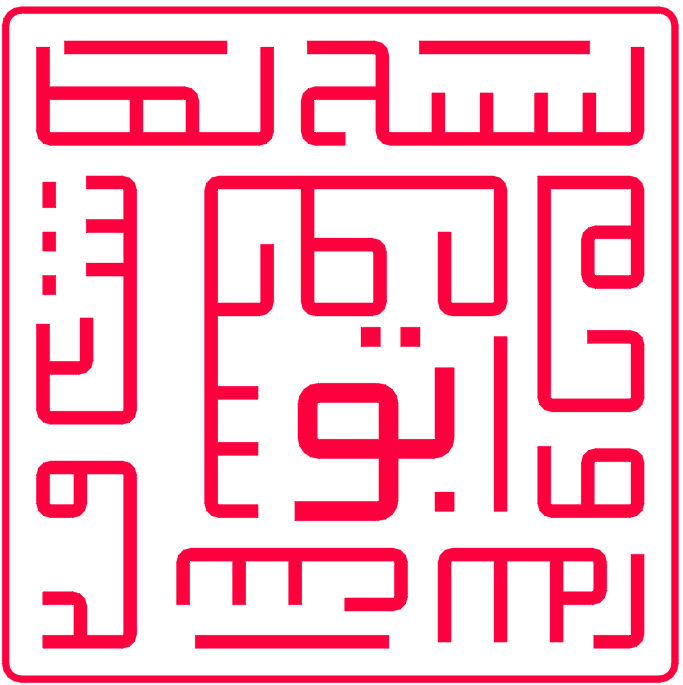
Perso-Arabic seal of Abu Ishaq Inju, a local sovereign ruling Region of Persia, son of a former land steward official of the Mongolain Khan.

=== Singaporean usage ===
The seal has been present in all Singapore dollar banknotes since its first series. They bear the signature and seal of the chairman of the Monetary Authority of Singapore (MAS) or of the chairman of the Board of Commissioners of Currency, Singapore (BCCS).

=== Vietnamese usage ===
The seal is used to a lesser extent in Vietnam by authorised organisations and businesses, and also traditional Vietnamese artists. It was more common in Vietnam prior to French rule and the abolition of the Nguyễn dynasty, when signatures became the usual practice, although usually seen as having less authority in a corporate environment. Modern Vietnamese organizations and agencies have switched to using circular seals with red ink and the organization's full name being inscribed in standard Vietnamese, with some incorporating monochromatic state emblem (for national authorities) or logo, with the traditional square forms having been popularly neglected.

Đại Nam thụ thiên vĩnh mệnh truyền quốc tỷ (大南受天永命傳國璽), the National Seal of the Nguyễn Dynasty (1846–1945)

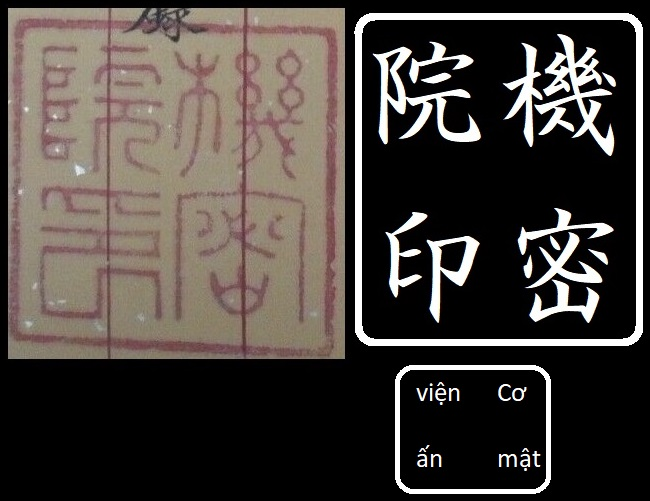
The seal of the Viện cơ mật with transliterations on the right to both the Traditional Chinese (regular) and Latin scripts

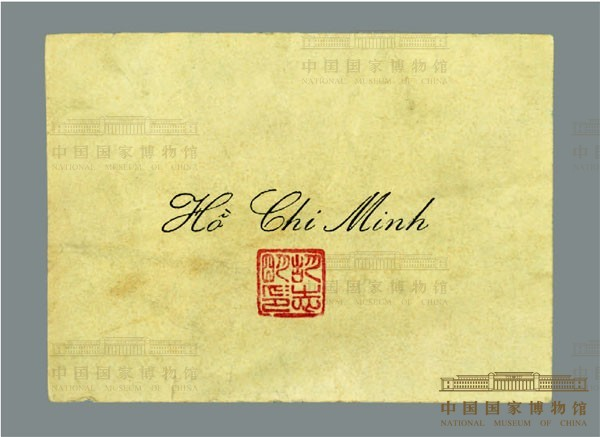
Hồ Chí Minh ấn (胡志明印), the personal seal of the North Vietnamese president Hồ Chí Minh appearing on his business card

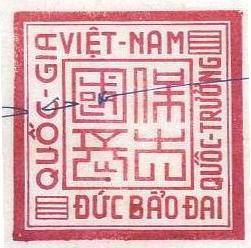
Seal of Bảo Đại as the Chief of the State of Vietnam (1949–1954)

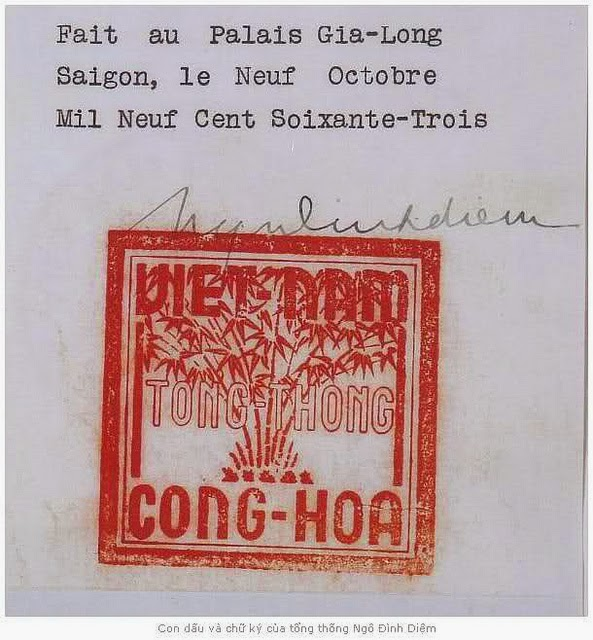
Seal of Ngô Đình Diệm as the President of South Vietnam in 1950s.

Great Seal of the Ministry of National Defence of the State of Vietnam with inscription of "國防縂長" (Quốc phòng tổng trưởng)

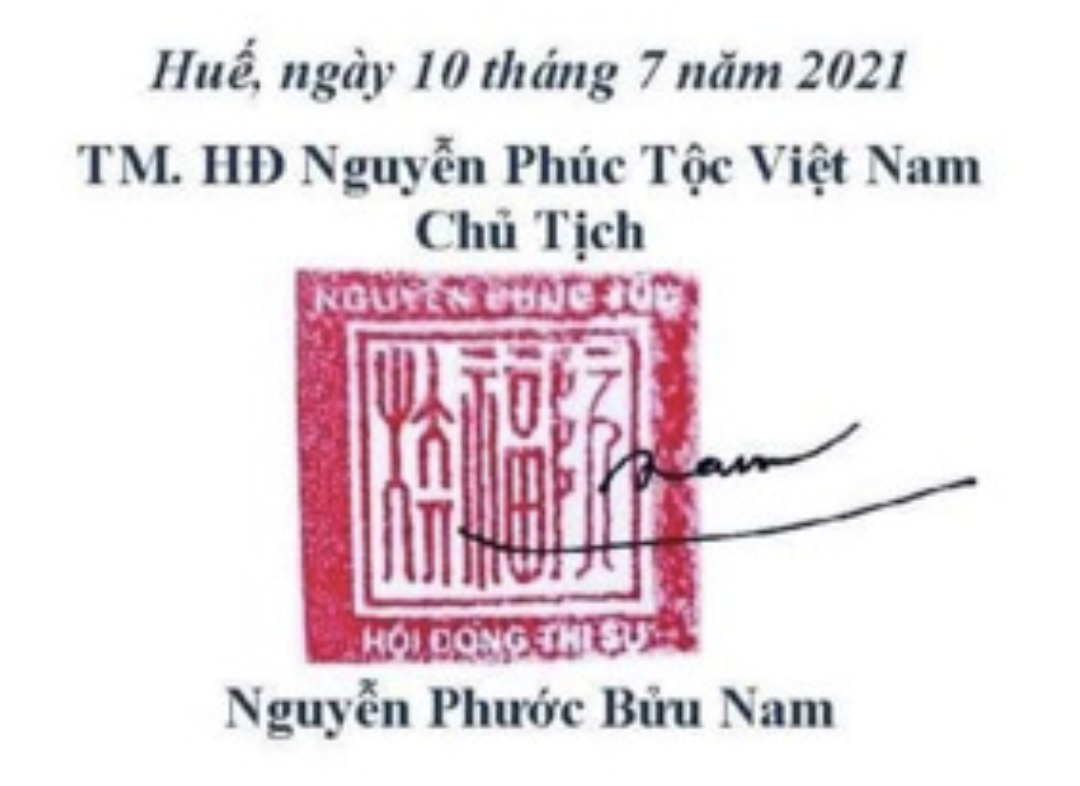
The seal of the contemporary House of Nguyễn Phúc Council, as seen in 2021

=== Laotian usage ===
Though not considered to be a part of the Sinosphere, seals were also used historically for administrative documents in Laos. Many of these documents, going back to at least the reign of King Photisarath (16th century) of Lan-Xang, are now in the collection of the National Library of Thailand, where they are referred to as ใบจุ้ม (bai-joom) documents. The Laotian seals do not contain writing.

== See also ==
- Wu Qiuyan
- The Eight Masters of Xiling and the Xiling Seal Art Society
- Cash seal
- Heirloom Seal of the Realm
- Huaya
- Kaō
- Knob carving
- Side carving
- Seal knob
- Seal script
