= Han Jinyu =

Chinese landscape painter (born 1979)

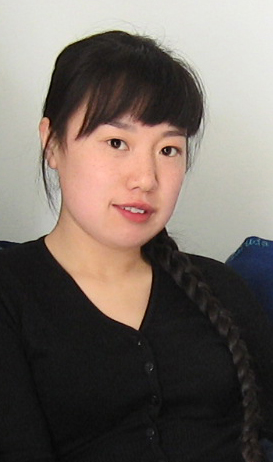
Han JinYu, 2007

Han Jinyu (Chinese: 韩瑾瑜; pinyin: Hán Jǐnyú; born 8 August 1979), also known as Ting-Ting or Ting-Ting Han, is an oil painter who specializes in portraits, still life and landscape. She mainly paints in the realist style but also modern art.

== Life and career ==
Her formal involvement in art began at the age of 3 years she was enrolled in the traditional Chinese arts by her mother. She was taught by the famous Shengjun Wang.

She formally developed and matured her painting skills under Shengjun Wang until she was 15 years of age. In addition to Chinese painting, she also developed the other important elements of traditional Chinese arts; poems (first Shi, then Ci), seals and calligraphy during this period.

At 15, Ting-Ting started to formally develop her skills in Western Fine arts. Until this point she had no interest in Western culture or Western Fine Arts, however needed to develop this side of her ability in order to be admitted into University.

She continued to grow and mature refining her skills as an artist in charcoal and pencil drawing, gouache, watercolors and oil painting. She worked with the components of landscapes, still life and portraiture within classical realism.

When 16, she enrolled in a Graphic design pre university study stream which ran for 3 years. At the end of the 3-year period she failed the Tsinghua University examination, so elected to study Fine Arts at the China Central Academy of Fine Arts in Beijing.

From the age of 19 until 24, she continued to study at the Central Academy of Fine Arts in the Oil Painting Department. This department is divided into four studios which are; Renaissance, Realism, Impressionism and Modern Abstract. Her Major was in Portraiture and Still life.

At the end of her final year, she won the Gold Medal for her painting "Death and Angel" when competing against her graduating class of 300 students.

In 2004, Ting-Ting graduated from the Central Academy of Fine Arts in Beijing, China.

During the following years, she worked as a teacher for the China Central Academy of Fine Arts in Beijing as well as other universities in other Provinces of China.

In 2008, she became a member of the Beijing Oil Painting Society.

Ting-Ting is also a member of Beijing Opera where she performs, and has painted her self-portrait in character.

Ting Ting has work in private and public collections in China, Germany, India, Italy, Netherlands, Thailand and USA.

In May 2010, she was chosen for a years scholarship of the Bösenberg-Stiftung and spend the time in the "Künstlerhaus Meinersen e.V.".

Within that year, she was able to create new art using the new components, objects and compositions – inspired by the German environment.

In 2011 she was invited by the Prince of Salm-Salm (Carl Philipp)(in German) to paint and have an exhibition in the Museum section of the castle Anholt.

In 2012 she was asked to create a rural painting in the Hotel section of the castle Anholt.

== Exhibitions ==
=== Solo exhibitions ===
- 1985: "Love Peace" 100 meters of pigeons
- 1986: "The Kites Flying" Traditional Chinese Painting
- 1992: "Ting-Ting’s Traditional Chinese Paintings" National Art Museum of China
- 2001: "Business Graphic Designs" Central Academy of Fine Arts Gallery
- 2004: "SARS – White Subject" Central Academy of Fine Arts Gallery
- 2008: "Invitation of Asian Famous Artist" River City Museum, Bangkok, Thailand
- 2009: "Landscape of Garda Lake" in Milano, Italy
- 2011: (March) "Open Studio Day" Künstlerhaus Meinersen, Germany
- 2011: (May) "East meets West" Künstlerhaus Meinersen, Germany
- 2011: (November) "Naturally: Anholt" Wasserburg Anholt, Germany

=== Group exhibitions ===
- 1985: "Love Peace" National Art Museum of China (Traveling tour art exhibit for Children)
- 1986: "Summer Palace" Chinese Children’s Art Show Traditional Chinese Painting (TCP), Handwriting, Photography & Stamp Making. ("Summer Palace" awarded "Second Place" in competition of TCP)
- 1987: "Lying Buddha" Chinese Children’s Art Show Traditional Chinese Painting, Handwriting, Photography & Stamp Making. ("Lying Buddha" awarded "First Place" in competition of TCP)
- 1988: "East & West" Chinese Children’s Art Show Traditional Chinese Painting, Handwriting, Photography & Stamp Making. ("East & West" awarded "First Place" in competition of Handwriting in Poems of the Song Dynasty)
- 1989: "Give Soldier Red Scarf" Chinese Children’s Art Show Traditional Chinese Painting, Handwriting, Photography & Stamp Making. ("Give Soldier Red Scarf" awarded "First Place" in competition of TCP)
- 1993: "Alley of Beijing" Photographic display, Beijing Hotel
- 1997: "Hong Kong Returns" National Art Museum of China (Traveling tour art exhibit)
- 2001: "Business & Graphic Design of University Students" Central Academy of Fine Arts Gallery
- 2004: "Death and Angel" Graduate literary and artistic creations by Central Academy of Fine Arts Gallery oil painting Department, won "Gold Medal"
- 2006: "Impressions of India" Chinese Famous Artists Association at Embassy of P.R.C in India, New Delhi, India
- 2012: (May) "East meets West II" Künstlerhaus Meinersen, Germany
