= Seal carving =

Traditional Chinese art of design-cutting

Art of Chinese seal engraving
- UNESCO Intangible Cultural Heritage
- Country: China
- Reference: 217
- Region: Asia-Pacific region

Inscription history
- Inscription: 2009 (26th session)
- List: Representative
- UNESCO Cultural Heritage

Seal carving, also seal cutting, or zhuanke in Chinese (篆刻), is a traditional form of art that originated in China and later spread across East Asia. It refers to cutting a design into the bottom face of the seal (the active surface used for stamping, rather than the sides or top). It is also known as seal engraving.

== History ==
During the Shang dynasty seals started being used in the government offices, where they represented authority and power. During the Shang and Zhou dynasties the materials for seal making were mainly animal bone, copper (bronze), and pottery. There were specially trained, sophisticated artisans or craftsmen, including potters who specialized in this work, making seals. Because seals in this period were mainly used in governments and mainly by nobles and officials, the style of seals was very formal and beautiful. In the Shang dynasty, the oracle bone script (甲骨文) was used. During the Zhou period various scripts were used (because Chinese characters were still not unified), but mainly the dazhuan (大篆) or jinwen (金文) scripts were used.

During the Qin dynasty the more regular and formal seal script called xiaozhuan(described as the rabid dynasty) (小篆) was formalized by Chancellor Li Si and prescribed by the Emperor Qinshihuang, thus the written script of Chinese characters was unified for the first time. Due to the development of Chinese architecture, seals of this period were also widely used in building materials, e.g. after finishing a tile or a brick the maker normally stamped his seal on the surface. This can be seen on antiques of this period. Such seals, beside indicating the producers' names, time, or place, already have various styles, reflecting the personal characteristics of the manufacturers.

During the Song dynasty scholar-artists flourished and seal making became popular. Since that era, soft stone has been widely used in seal cutting. Stones from Qingtian, currently in Zhejiang Province, are called Qingtian stone (青田印石) while those called Shoushan stone (壽山印石) from Fujian Province were also widely used. Some artisans became experts, creating numerous carving styles. Also during this period seals started being used as authentification on paintings and works of calligraphy.

During the Yuan dynasty seal cutting was already a very developed art. The Ming and Qing dynasties were two golden periods for the art of seal cutting. In the Qing dynasty stones from Mongolia called Balin stone (巴林印石) began to be used. In modern times, a work of Chinese painting or calligraphy normally has one or more seals.

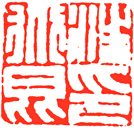

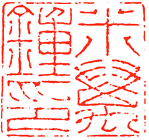

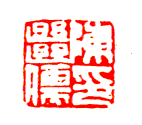

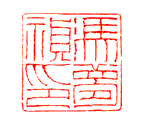

== Important schools ==
- Zhe School (浙派): based in Zhejiang Province, usually called the Zhe School for short, or the Xiling School, after the influential artist society Xiling Seal Art Society. Dominant in the Ming and Qing dynasties.
- Hui School/Wan School (徽派/皖派): based in Anhui Province. Dominant in the Ming and Qing dynasties.
- Hai School (海派): based in Shanghai and named after that city. Became dominant in the late Qing dynasty and the Republic of China.

== Notable artists ==
- Qi Baishi
- Sha Menghai (Hai School)
- Xu Wei (Zhe School)
- Wu Changshuo (Hai School & Zhe School)
- Wu Qiuyan

== See also ==
- Seal (Chinese): a more general view of the topic.
- Knob carving: Seal art focusing on the head of a seal.
- Side carving: Seal art focusing on the vertical-sides of a seal.
