= Seal knob =

Small decorative relief at the top or side of a seal

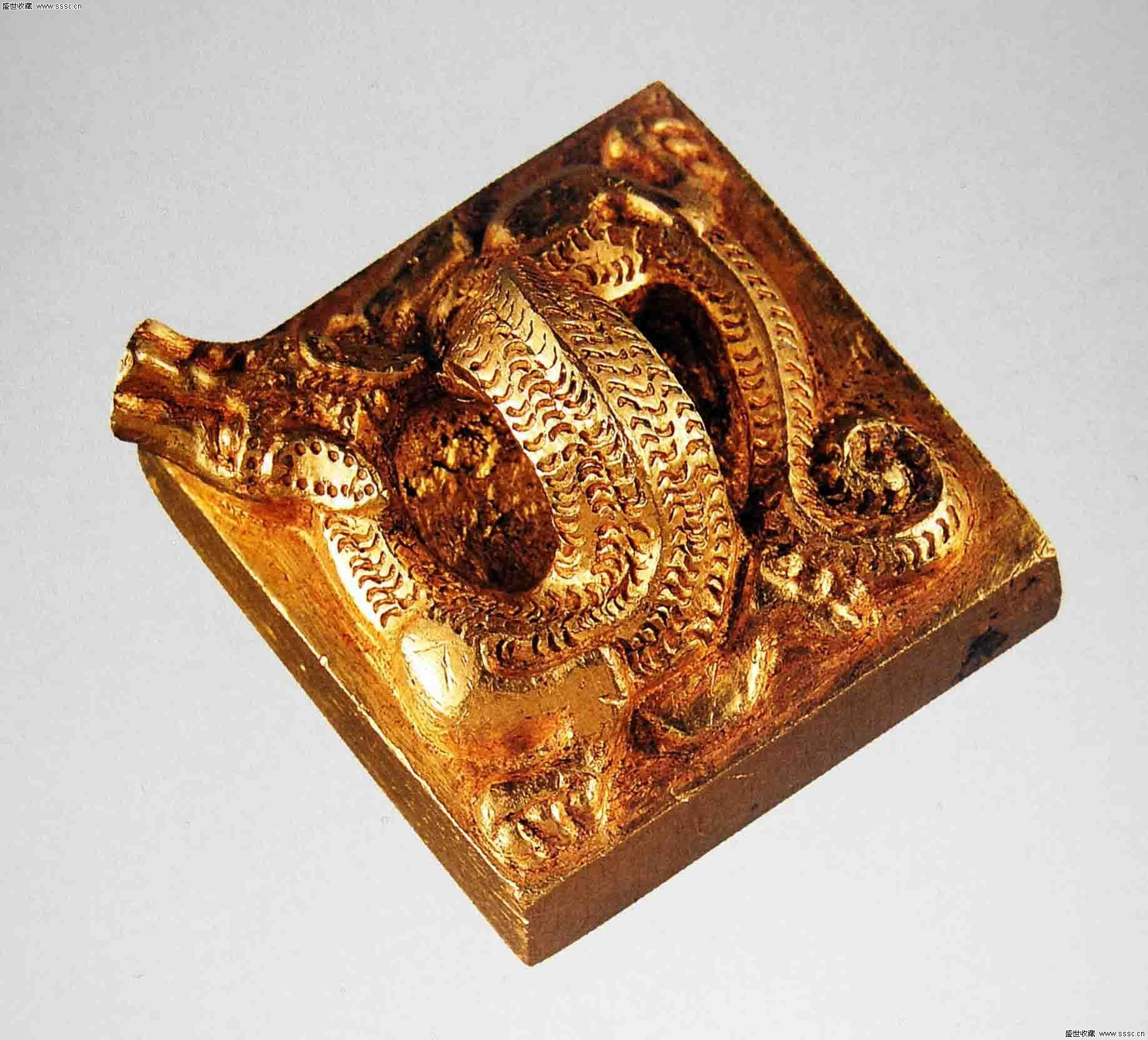
- A Chinese dragon knob, on the Seal of Emperor Wen of the Nanyue Kingdom
- Traditional Chinese: 印紐
- Simplified Chinese: 印纽
- Hanyu Pinyin: yìnniǔ

Knob carving
- Traditional Chinese: 紐刻
- Simplified Chinese: 纽刻
- Hanyu Pinyin: niǔkè

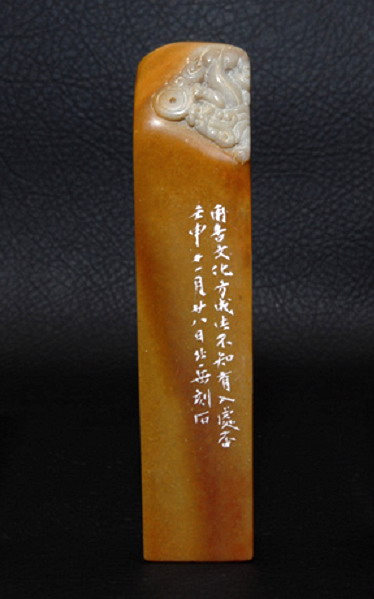
The seal sculpture here is water waves and a salamander (only half of its body can be seen) with its hind leg holding a coin. It combines the natural colors of the seal stone very well. On its front surface is the side carving, indicating the date and place of making this seal.

Seal knob (印纽), sometimes also seal sculpture, refers to carving or small decorative reliefwork at the top or side of a seal. The associated carving technique is called knob carving (纽刻), a traditional technique that originated in ancient China and later spread to other East Asian countries, including Japan and Korea.

== Nomenclature ==
In ancient China during the Zhou, Qin, and Han dynasties, the head or top-side of a seal was named niu (simplified Chinese: 纽; traditional Chinese: 紐). After the Qin and Han dynasties, it was also known as yin niu (simplified Chinese: 印纽; traditional Chinese: 印紐), and yin (印) here stands for seal. In this sense a seal knob could also be called a seal head (yin shou 印首).

Notably, the character for knob (niǔ) is sometimes written as 钮 in simplified Chinese (with 钅), and 鈕 in traditional Chinese (with 金), instead of using the nowadays more commonly used 纽 (with 纟) or 紐 (with 糹) respectively, mainly because in the very early periods governmental seals were mainly made of metal.

In addition, a seal knob is also referred to as a seal nose (yin bi 印鼻): "the nose of seal"; bi (鼻) means "nose", perhaps because in ancient time people needed a rope to pull on the seal through its top, just like pulling on an ox or slave through his nose.

Accordingly, the knob carving technique is also named touke (simplified Chinese: 头刻; traditional Chinese: 頭刻), the sculpture carving of (a seal's) head.

== Histories ==
=== Zhou, Qin, Han dynasties ===
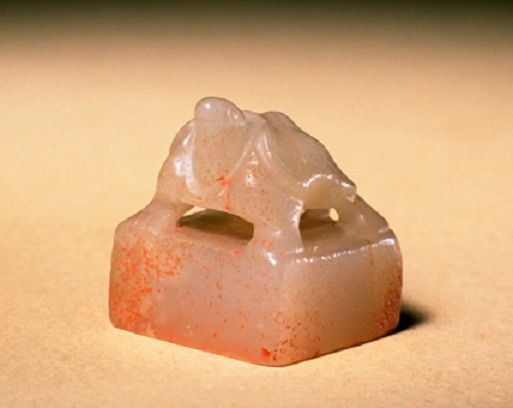
Turtle sculpture of an Eastern Han dynasty (about 2,000 years ago) private seal made of jade.

The head of a Zhou or Qin seal is often a bar, handle/stem, tile, or ring shape. During these periods, seals were normally official and used in government business. The material to make a seal was normally a metal such as bronze, copper, or iron, because durable metals were considered as "immortal", which could represent the authority of the rule or government. Private seals were not so commonly seen and were mainly for very high ranking officials and nobles, as well as the Emperor. The head of the seal, called niu (鈕/钮), rarely had artistic elements. Its use was just for convenience in handling the seal, such as a ring to hang the seal from a belt by means of a cord.

In the Han dynasty the head of seals commonly represented turtles or pyramids, which have a long life, and had propitious meanings, representing the stable, immortal authority of the government. Jade was often used.

=== Tang and Song dynasties ===
During the Tang and Song dynasties governmental seals were still the most dominant, and their style continued those of the Han dynasty. But in the Song dynasty, especially the Southern Song dynasty, due to the rise of artist groups and scholars and the prosperity of the economy, common people also needed to express or identify themselves, and private seals became more and more popular.

=== Yuan, Ming, and Qing dynasties ===
In the late Yuan dynasty famous specialized seal artists or craftsmen appeared. In the mid and late Ming dynasty, seal sculpture became truly popular among artists and scholars for the first time. Together with the Kang-Yong-Qian period of the Qing dynasty, these are considered as the golden periods of seal sculpture. Seals, especially the emperor's seal, might feature a Chinese dragon or Qilin instead of a turtle. The so-called dragon-turtle is also seen.

== Carving technique ==
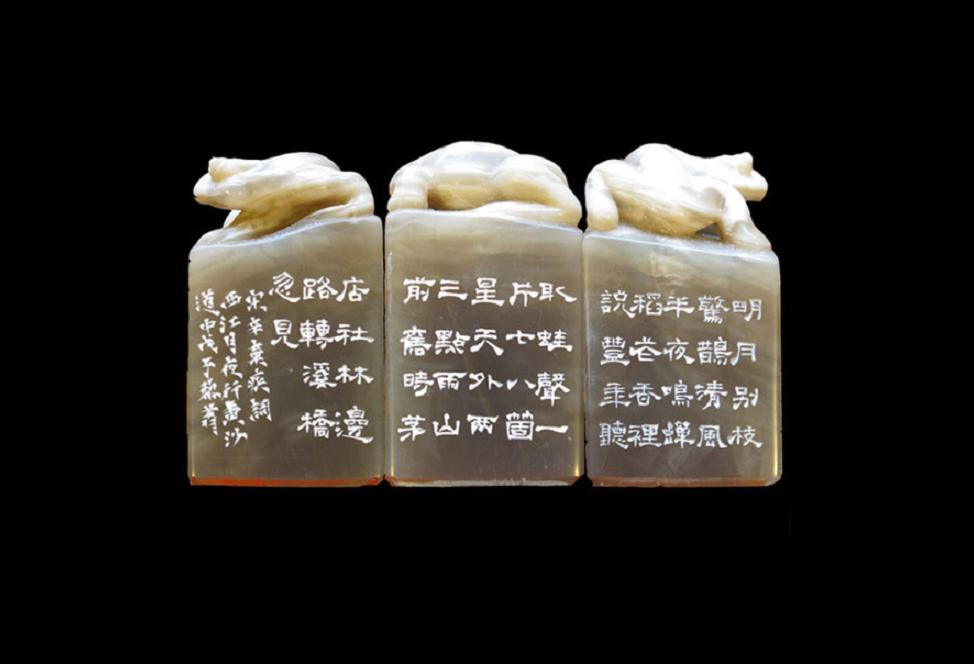
This xian zhang (閑章/闲章) seal has a frog sculpture and side-engraving of a poem and remarks, a typical combination of these two elements. This seal also belongs to the style of rural life.

The techniques to make a seal sculpture are the same as for sculpture in other stone carvings, though the area to be carved is very small, requiring special skills and tools.

For many private seals, such as those of artists, calligraphers, and painters, a wide range of subjects are depicted. The sculpture of their seals (such as the xian zhang (閑章/闲章; roughly translated as "seal of leisure")) could be pets, landscapes, or other symbols from their daily lives or rusticity.

Sometimes a seal stone had different colors on its surfaces or inside the stone and the sculptor needed to make a perfect combination of these colors with their sculpture. In ancient Chinese this is called qiao diao (巧雕; roughly, "sculpture of cleverness").

Often seal sculpture is combined with the side-engraving of the seal and the seal cutting. All of the three are basic elements to make a perfect seal, or the basic elements of seal art.

== See also ==
- Seal (East Asia), a more general view of the topic
- Seal script, the Chinese character script created during the development of the Chinese seal art
