= Imperial Seal of the Mongols =

Seal of the Mongol Empire

- Adopted: 13th century
- Motto: Möngke ṭngri-yin küčündür. Yeke Mongγol ulus-un dalai-in qanu ǰrlγ. Il bulγa irgen-dür kürbesü, büsiretügüi azatuγai. ("Under the Power of the Eternal Heaven, if the Decree of the Oceanic Khan of the Great Mongol Nation reaches people both subject or belligerent, let them revere, let them fear") ᠮᠥᠩᠬᠡ ᠲᠩᠷᠢ ᠶᠢᠨ ᠬᠦᠴᠦᠨᠳᠦᠷ ᠶᠡᠬᠡ ᠮᠣᠩᠭᠣᠯ ᠤᠯᠤᠰ ᠤᠨ ᠳᠠᠯᠠᠢ ᠢᠨ ᠬᠠᠨᠤ ᠵᠷᠯᠭ ᠢ ᠪᠣᠯᠭᠠ ᠢᠷᠭᠡᠨ ᠳᠦᠷ ᠬᠦᠷᠪᠡᠰᠦ ᠪᠦᠰᠢᠷᠡᠲᠦᠭᠦᠶ ᠠᠶᠤᠲᠤᠭᠠᠶ

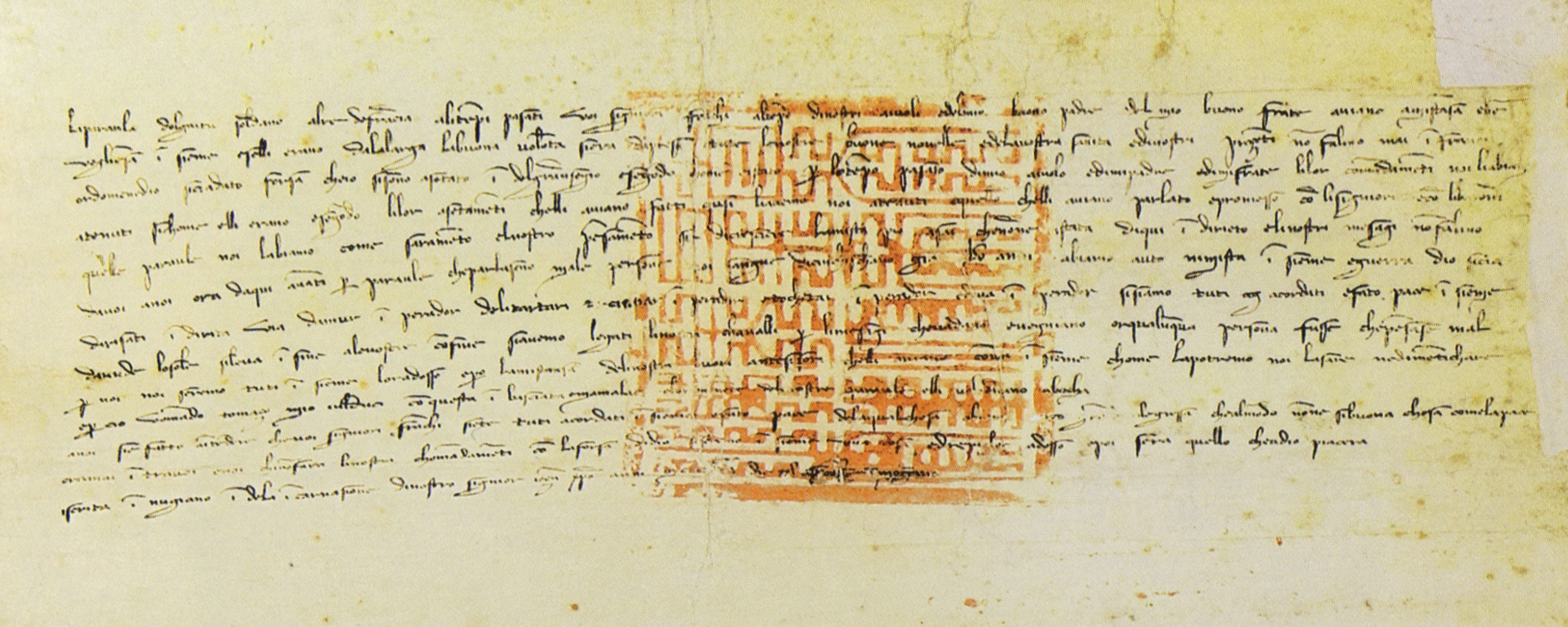
Translation of Oljeitu's message by Buscarello de Ghizolfi, on the back of the letter (visible here).

The Imperial Seal of the Mongols is a seal (tamgha) that was used by the Mongols. The imperial seals, bearing inscriptions in Mongolian script or other scripts, were used in the Mongol Empire, the Yuan dynasty, and the Northern Yuan dynasty, among others.

According to Plano Carpini, the Russian handicraftsman, Kozma, made a seal for Güyük Khan. This seal might have been a seal used to stamp the letter to Pope Innocent IV.

The Polish scholar, Cyrill Koralevsky, shot a photo of the seal in 1920. The prominent French Mongolist, Paul Pelliot, translated the Mongolian scripts on the seal later. However, the Mongolists believe that Kozma made only one of the imperial seals and a seal on the letter was Genghis Khan's, which was inherited by his successors.

During the Yuan dynasty, which ruled Mongolia, the whole of China proper, Tibet and other areas, several new seals were issued for local rulers. The imperial seal was kept by the Borjigin clan and was brought back to Mongolia when the Yuan court fled north. When the Northern Yuan collapsed in 1635, Ejei Khan gave a seal written in small seal script to Hong Taiji, Khan of the Later Jin dynasty, which later became the Qing dynasty in 1636.

== See also ==
- Heirloom Seal of the Realm
- National seals of the Republic of China
- Seal of the People's Government of the People's Republic of China
- National seals of South Korea
- National emblems of Japan
- Imperial emblem of Manchukuo
- Seals of the Nguyễn dynasty
