= Royal household =

Residence and administrative headquarters of a monarchy

A royal household or imperial household is the residence and administrative headquarters in ancient and post-classical monarchies, and papal household for popes, and formed the basis for the general government of the country as well as providing for the needs of the sovereign and their relations. It is the core of the royal court, though a court includes many courtiers who are not directly employed by the monarch as part of the household.

Traditionally there often have been large numbers of employees in the household, strictly differentiated by rank, from nobles with highly sought-after positions that gave close access to the monarch, to all the usual servants such as cooks, footmen, and maids. Traditionally the household typically includes military forces providing security. Specialists such as artists, clock-makers and poets might be given a place in the household, often by appointing them as valet de chambre or the local equivalent.

Among many of these households there are certain great offices which have become, in course of time, merely hereditary. In most cases, as the name of the office would suggest, they were held by those who discharged personal functions about the sovereign. Gradually, in ways or for reasons which might vary in each individual case, the office alone survived, the duties either ceasing to be necessary or being transferred to officers of less exalted station.

In the modern period, royal households have evolved into entities which are variously differentiated from national governments. Most modern households have become merely titular. An example of a present-day royal household that employs hundreds of people, with many job descriptions, is the household of Charles III.

== Asia ==
=== Japan ===
In Japan, the Imperial Household Agency (宮内庁, Kunaichō) is the agency within the Government of Japan responsible for supporting the Emperor and the Imperial Family as well as keeping the Privy Seal and Great Seal of Japan.

The Agency is headed by a director-general, who is assisted by the Cabinet-appointed deputy director. The internal organisation of the Agency can be seen below.

- The Grand Steward's Secretariat
- Board of Chamberlains
- Emperor Emeritus' Household
- Crown Prince's Household
- Board of Ceremonies
- Archives and Mausolea Department
- Maintenance and Works Department

Auxiliary organs of the Agency include:

- Office of the Shoshoin Treasure House
- Imperial Stock Farm

Local branch office:

- Kyoto Office

== Europe ==
The royal households of such of European monarchies have a continuous history since medieval times.

=== Germany ===
==== Prussia ====
*1. Supreme Officers of the Court (Oberste Hofchargen) - honorary functions

  - 1.1. The Grand Chamberlain (Oberst-Kämmerer)
  - 1.2. The Grand Cup-Bearer (Oberst-Schenk)
  - 1.3. The Grand Steward (Oberst-Truchseß)
  - 1.4. The Grand Marshal (Oberst-Marschall)
  - 1.5. The Grand Master of the Hunt (Oberst-Jägermeister)
- 2. Chief Officers of the Household (Oberhofchargen)
  - 2.0. The Premier Marshal of the Household (Oberhof- und Hausmarschall, i. e. chief executive officer of the court)
  - 2.1. The Premier Master of Ceremonies (Ober-Zeremonienmeister)
  - 2.2. The Premier Master of the Robes (Ober-Gewandkämmerer)
  - 2.3. The Premier Cellarer (Ober-Mundschenk)
  - 2.4. The Premier Master of the Horses and Mews (Ober-Stallmeister)
  - 2.5. The Premier Master of the Hunt (Ober-Jägermeister)
  - 2.6. The Premier Captain of the Palace Guard (Ober-Schloßhauptmann)
  - 2.7. The Premier Master of the Kitchen (Ober-Küchenmeister)
  - 2.8. The Superintendent general of the Theaters (Generalintendant der Schauspiele)

==== Mannheim (Electors Palatinate) ====
- The Grand Master of the Household (Obristhofmeister)
  - Stewards (Truchsesse)
  - The Master of the Music (Hofkapellmeister)
  - The Scientist of the Court (Librarian, Masters of the Collections)
  - The Artists of the Court
  - The medical staff
- The Grand Chamberlain (Obristkämmerer)
  - Court's Chamberlains (Hofkämmerer)
  - Life Offices
- The Grand Marshal of the Household (Obristhofmarschall)
  - The Master of the Larder
  - The Master of the Cellar
  - The Master of the Tablecloth
  - The Master of the Silver and China
  - The Master of Kitchen
  - The Master of the Pastry
- The Grand Master of the Mews (Obriststallmeister)
  - Court's Fourriers
- The Grand Master of the Hunt (Obristjägermeister)
- The Superintendent of the Court's Music

== See also ==
- Medieval household
