= State Seal of Japan =

- Armiger: Naruhito, Emperor of Japan
- Adopted: 1874
- Motto: Dai Nippon/Nihon kokuji (大日本國璽, "National seal of Great(er) Japan") 大日本 國璽

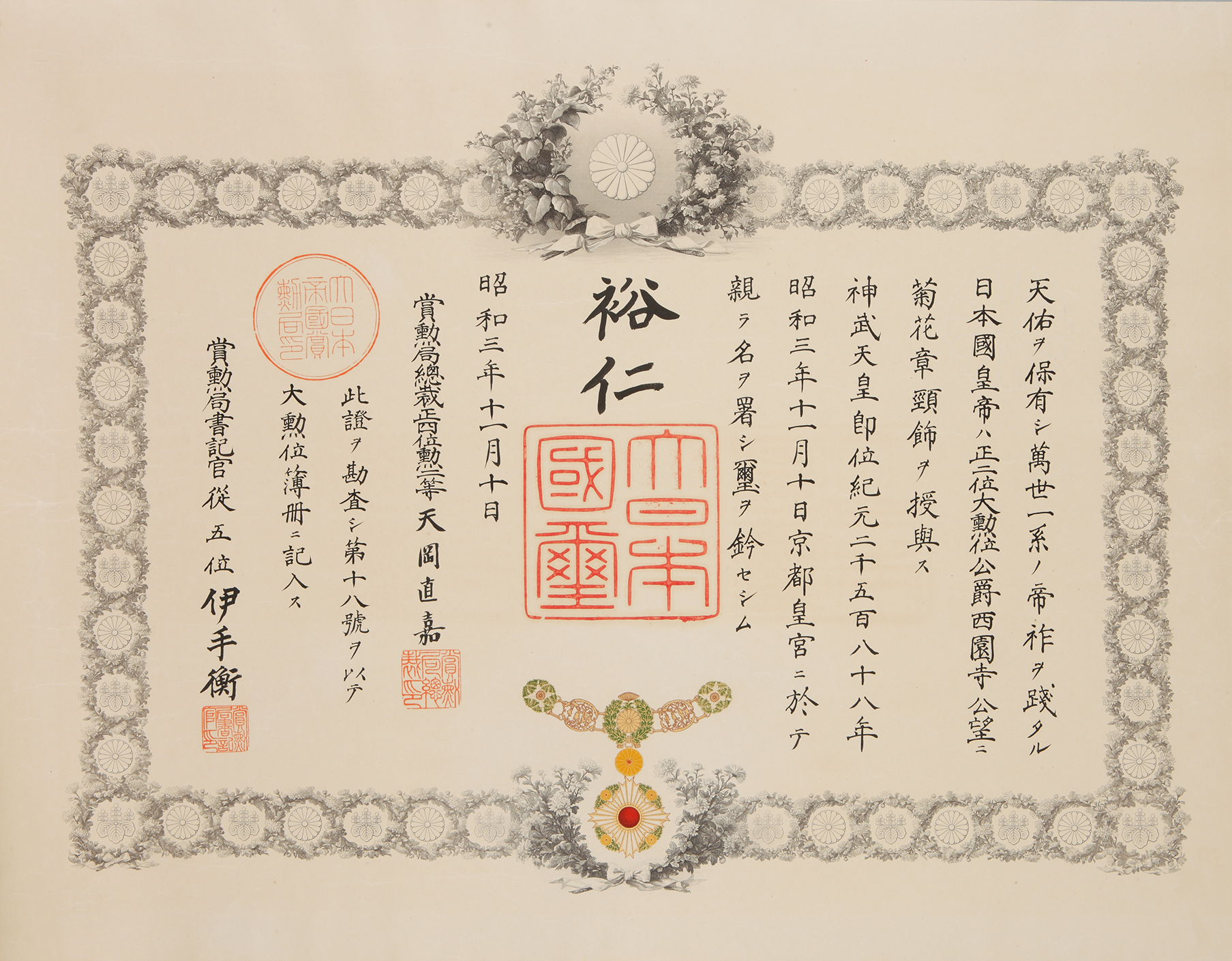
A Collar of the Supreme Order of the Chrysanthemum certificate, with State Seal clearly visible

The State Seal of Japan (国璽, kokuji) is one of the national seals of Japan and is used as the seal of the state.

== Description ==
The seal is made from pure gold, measures 3 sun (about 9 cm) and weighs 4.5 kg. It is square, and its inscription 大日本國璽 ("Seal of Great Japan") is written in seal script (篆書, tensho). It is written vertically in two lines, with the right-hand side containing the characters 大日本 (Dai Nippon), and the left-hand side containing the characters 國璽 (Kokuji).

The seal is stored in a specially designated leather bag. When used, a special ruler is used to make sure the seal is imprinted correctly, and the cinnabar seal ink is specially made by the National Printing Bureau so that it will not bend or shift.

== History ==
Abei Rekido, the Kyoto-based master-hand of the seal Abei Rekido (安部井 櫟堂; 1805–1883) of Kyoto was ordered to produce the seal, and he manufactured it with the Privy Seal of Japan in one year in 1874. Although there was no character "帝" (imperial) in the seal text, since it was manufactured before Japan became formally known as 大日本帝国 (Dai Nippon Teikoku) by the Meiji Constitution, it was not reminted at the establishment of the Meiji Constitution.

Under the Meiji Constitution, the cases where the Privy Seal or State Seal is used was defined on the official note formula (公文式: kōbunshiki 1886–1907) and the official formula code (公令式: kōreisiki 1907–1947). However, the code was abolished with the enforcement of the Constitution of Japan, with no replacement statute. Currently, the State Seal is only used for certificates of Japanese orders (勲記, kunki), given by the State. If the State Seal or the Privy Seal are illegally reproduced, the penalty is at least two years or more of terminable penal servitude according to Article 164 of the 1st clause of the criminal code.

At the 2019 Japanese imperial transition, the State Seal – together with the Privy Seal and two of the Imperial Regalia – featured twice during the ceremonies: During the abdication of Emperor Akihito on 30 April, and during the accession of Emperor Naruhito on 1 May, chamberlains carried the seals into the Hall of Pines, where they were placed on tables near the reigning Emperor.

== See also ==
- National seals of Japan
- Imperial Seal of China
- National Seals of the Republic of China
- Seal of the State Council of the People's Republic of China
- Seal of South Korea
