= National seals of South Korea =

National Seal of the Republic of Korea 대한민국의 국새
- Armiger: South Korea
- Adopted: 25 October 2011; 14 years ago
- Motto: 대한민국 (Republic of Korea)

The National Seal of South Korea (Korean: 대한민국의 국새; Hanja: 大韓民國의 國璽; RR: Daehanmin-gugui guksae; MR: Taehanmin'gugŭi kuksae) is a governmental seal used for purposes of state in South Korea. The seal is carved with characters called injang.

Since the late 20th century, the seal's design consists of South Korea's official name written in hangeul inside of a square; during the mid-20th century hanja in Seal Script were used.

== History ==
Following the establishment of the South Korean state in August 1948, its government adopted on 5 May 1949 a new state seal, or guksae (Korean: 국새). It is used in promulgation of the constitution, designation of cabinet members and ambassadors, conference of national orders and important diplomatic documents.

The seal's design has been modified multiple times over the years. The first version of the seal, used until the early 1960s, used Hanja characters 大韓民國之璽 (Note: Korean: 대한민국지새; RR: Daehanmingukjisae). It was made of silver, while the design of the seal knob is disputed, being either a dragon, or a sapsali. Later, the lettering was changed to use only Hangeul characters, and the knob was redesigned as turtle. For the third seal, the knob was designed as two phoenixes and a hibiscus syriacus, and made of gold. The fourth seal featured a phoenix only for the knob. The fifth seal again featured two phoenixes and a hibiscus syriacus at the top.

The current seal is the fifth version and was designed in September 2011, being adopted in October 2011.

=== Guksae ===
A guksae (국새) or oksae (옥새) is an official seal made for use in lieu of signatures in personal documents, office paperwork, contracts, art, or any item requiring acknowledgment or authorship in South Korea. Guksae is carved with characters called injang.

In the past, guksae were called oksae, and were used as a symbol of the legitimacy of the king and the country. The term guksae began to be used during the reign of Gongmin from the Goryeo Dynasty (reigned 1351-1374). During the Joseon Dynasty (1392-1910), oksae was used as a symbol of royal authority and to authenticate official documents. Whenever a king ascends the throne, the handing over of oksae is a formal event that symbolizes the transfer of power. During the ceremonial procession, oksae are placed in the place of the procession to symbolize the power of the king.

Seal of the Korean Empire

Seal of the Provisional Government of the Republic of Korea

Seal of South Korea

== Gallery ==
Historical seal of Goryeo (AD 1370–1392)

First national seal (1949–1962)

Second national seal (1963–1999)

Third national seal (1999–2008, 2010–2011)

Fourth national seal (2008–2010)

Fifth national seal (since 2011)
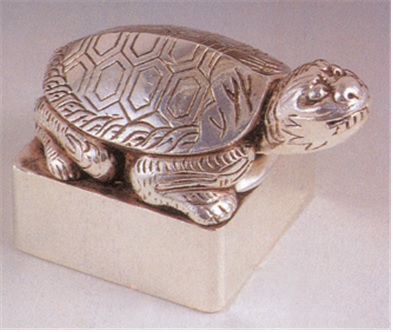
Seal knob of the second national seal

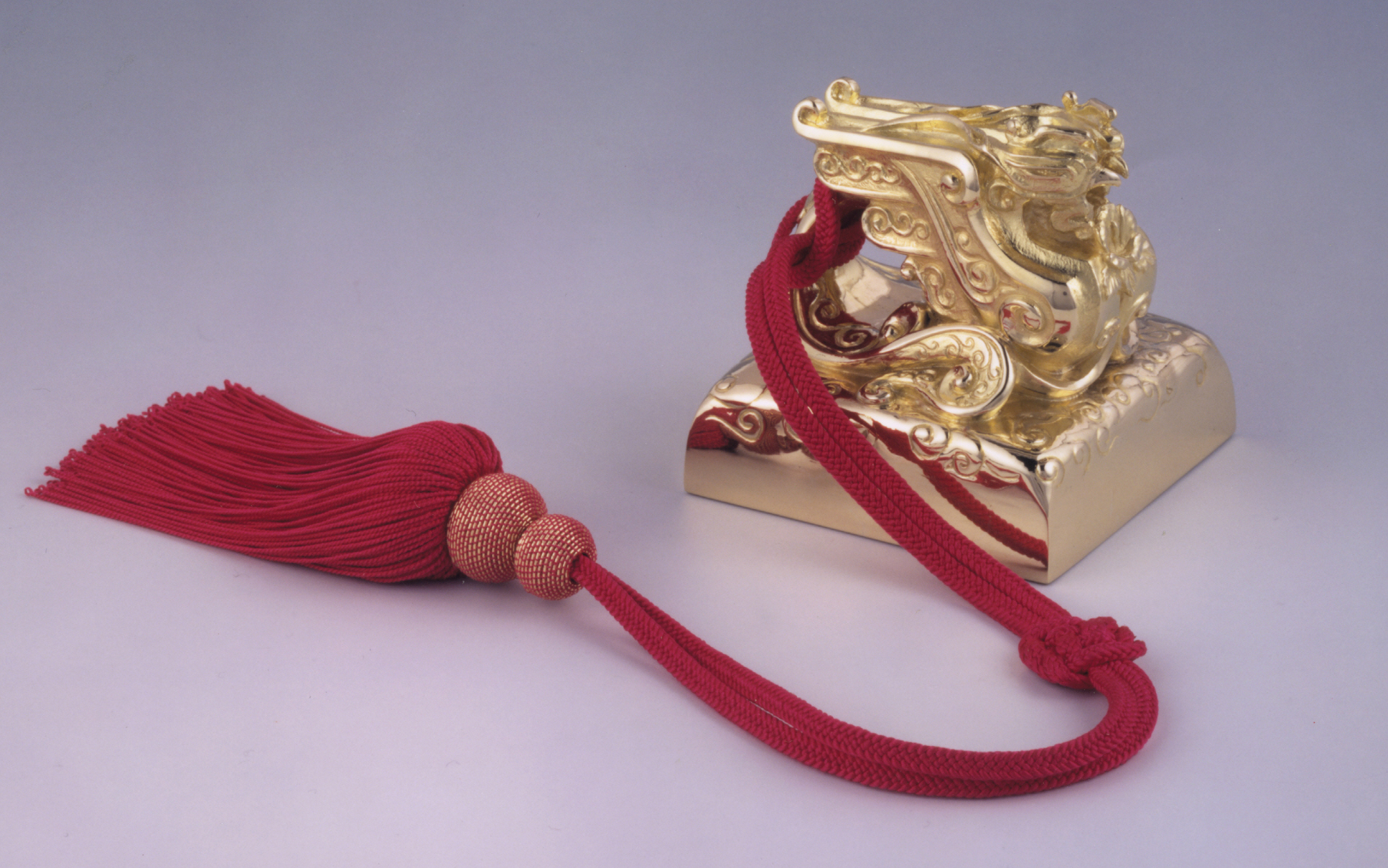
Seal knob of the third national seal

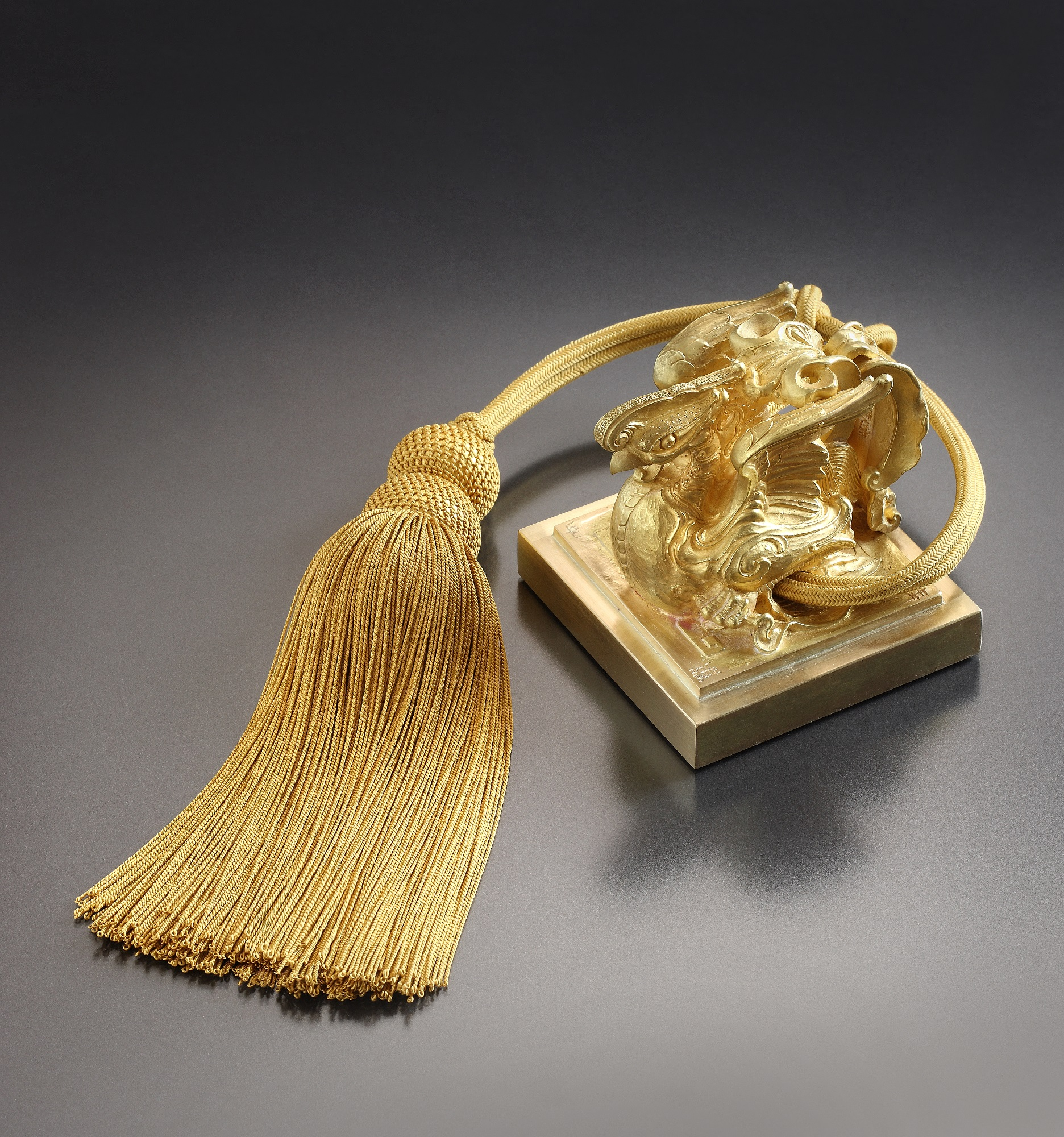
Seal knob of the fourth national seal

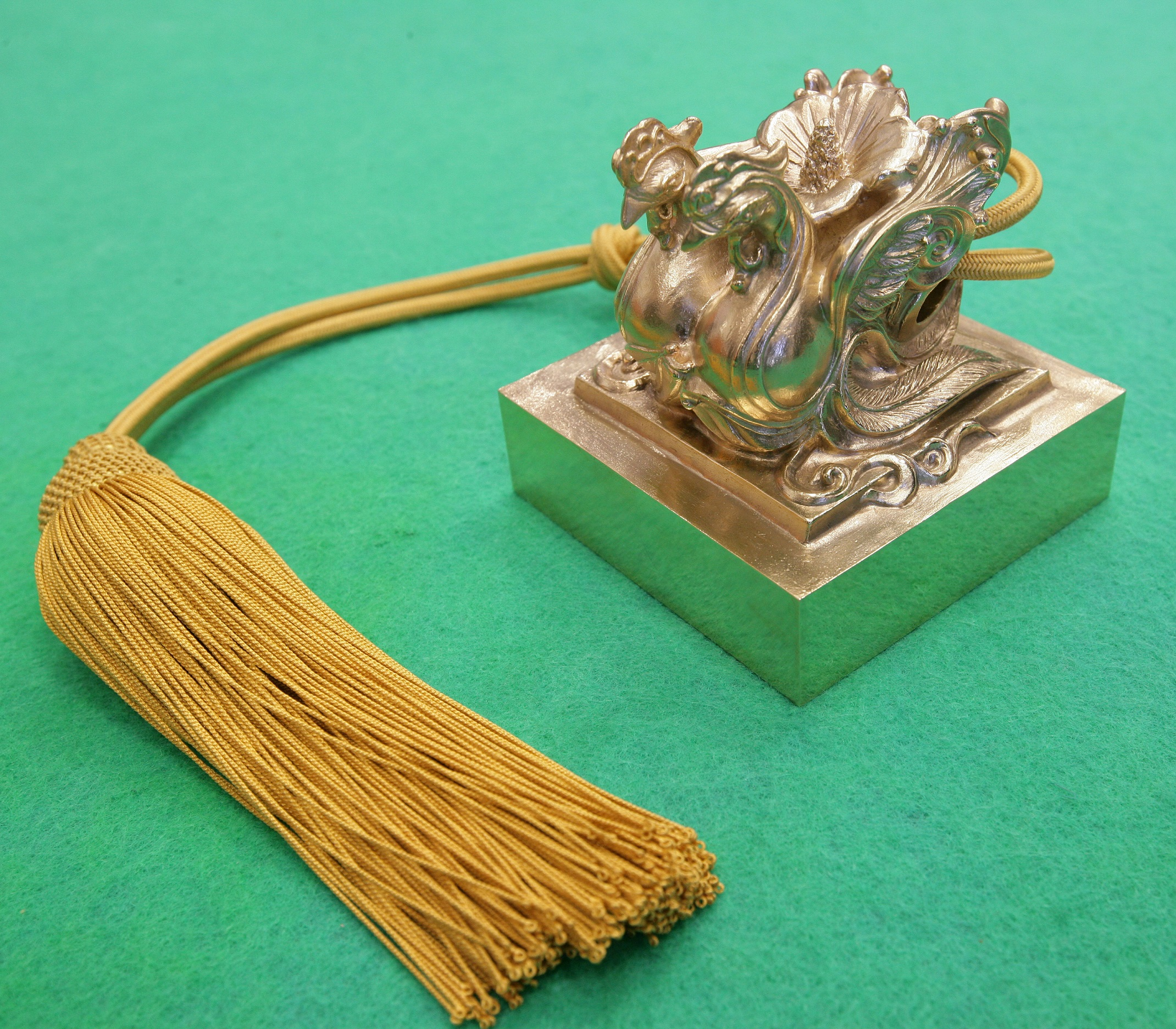
Seal knob of the fifth national seal

== Other seals ==
Other officials also have their own seals, including the president, prime minister, and ministers.

Seal of the president of South Korea

Seal of the prime minister of South Korea

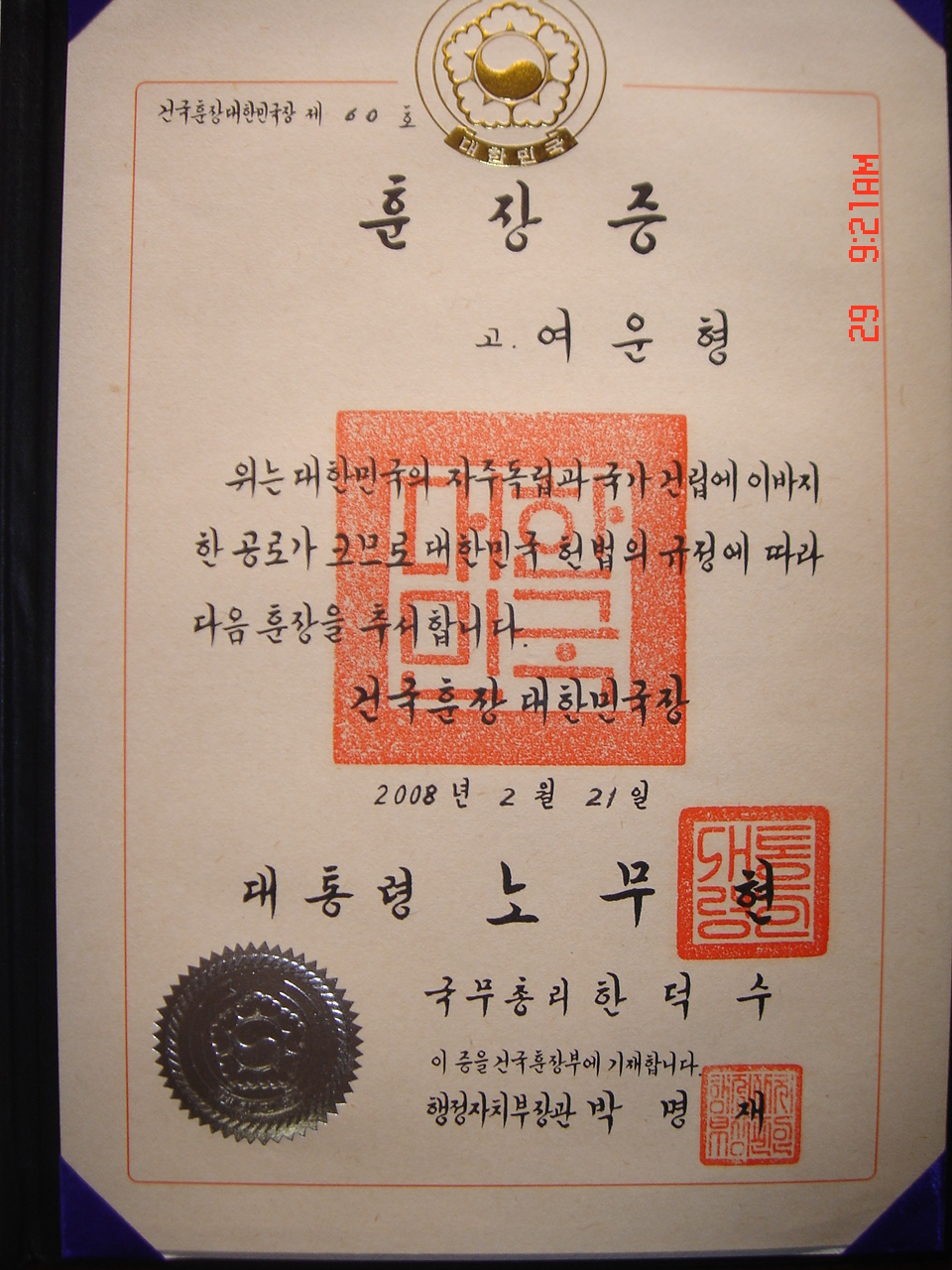
The national, presidential, and a ministerial seal seen on a certificate awarding the Order of Merit for National Foundation

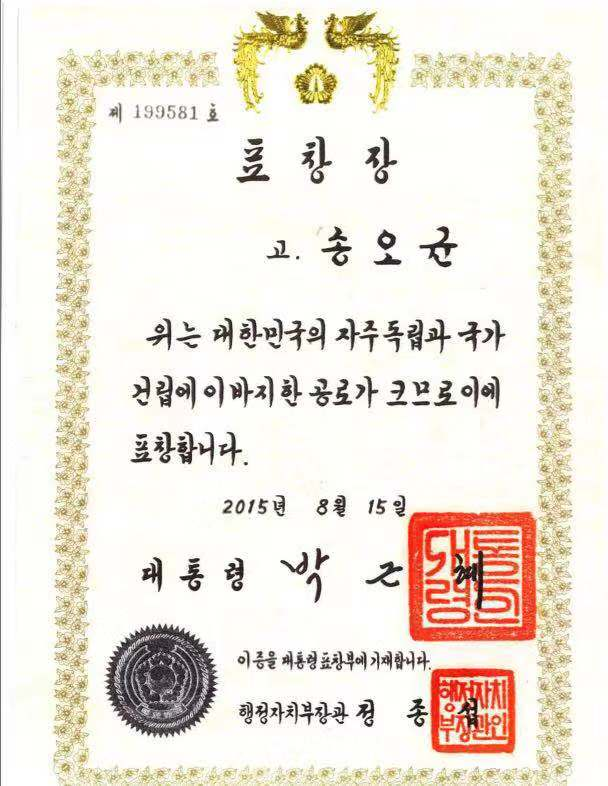
The presidential seal seen on a certificate awarding the Presidential Commendation Award (대통령표창) to Song Oh-kyun

== See also ==
- Imperial Seal of China
- Cash seal (China)
- National Seals of the Republic of China
- Seal of the State Council of the People's Republic of China
- Privy Seal of Japan
- State Seal of Japan
- Seal script
- Seal cutting (art)
- Seal engraving (art)
