= National emblems of Japan =

Emblems used by the Japanese state

The national emblems of Japan are symbols used by the Emperor and government of Japan to identify themselves. The emblems consist of seals and mon (known as crests or emblems).

- The Imperial crest of Japan (also called the chrysanthemum crest)
- The Government crest of Japan (the 5–7 paulownia)
- The Privy Seal of Japan
- The State Seal of Japan

== Gallery ==
Imperial Mon

Government Mon

State Seal

Privy Seal

Cabinet Seal

== See also ==
- Chrysanthemum Throne
- Imperial Regalia of Japan
- Japanese honors system
- List of Japanese flags
- Mon (emblem)
- National symbols of Japan
