= Privy Seal of Japan =

One of the national seals of Japan

- Armiger: Naruhito, Emperor of Japan
- Adopted: Nara period
- Motto: Tennō/Gyoji (天皇御璽, "The Emperor's Imperial Seal") 天皇 御璽

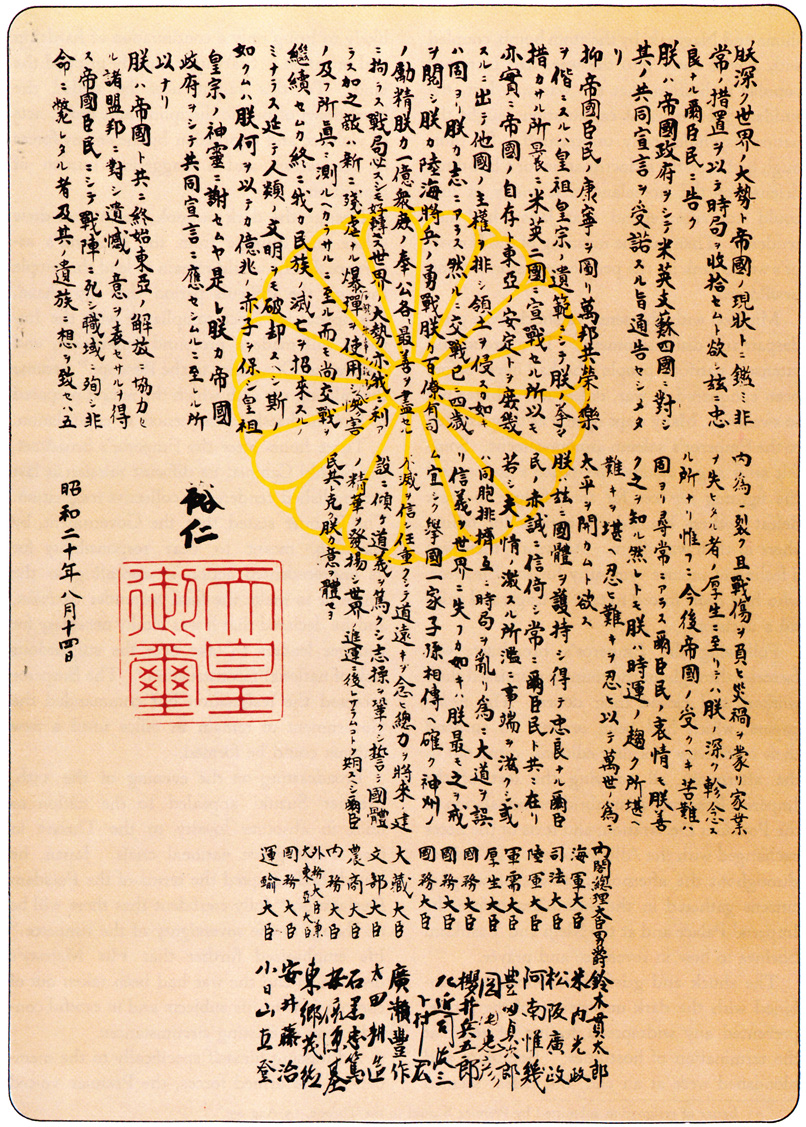
Single page print of the Imperial Rescript on the Termination of the War (1945), with Privy Seal clearly visible

The Privy Seal of Japan (御璽, Gyoji) is one of the national seals and is the Emperor of Japan's official seal.

== Description ==
The Privy Seal of Japan is square, and its inscription 天皇御璽 ("The Emperor's Imperial Seal") is written in seal script (篆書, tensho). It has two lines of vertical writing, with the right-hand side containing the characters 天皇 (Tennō, Emperor), and on the left-hand side containing the characters 御璽 (Gyoji, Imperial Seal).

The present Privy Seal is made of pure gold and is about 3 sun (about 9 cm) in size and weighs 4.5 kg. The master-hand of the seal was Abei Rekido (安部井 櫟堂; 1805-1883) of Kyoto. He was commissioned to manufacture the State Seal of Japan within one year, in 1874 (Meiji 7).

When not in use, the seal is kept in a leather bag. The seal is used with special cinnabar seal ink specially made by the National Printing Bureau.

== Use ==
The Privy Seal of Japan is printed on Imperial rescripts, proclamation of sentences of laws, cabinet orders, treaties, instruments of ratification, ambassadors' credentials and their dismissal documents, documents of general power of attorney, consular commissions, letters authorizing foreign consuls, letters of appointment or dismissal of government officials whose appointment requires the Emperor's attestation, and appointment documents and documents of the Prime Minister and Chief Justice, and their respective dismissals.

At the 2019 Japanese imperial transition, the Privy Seal – together with the State Seal and two of the Imperial Regalia – featured twice during the ceremonies: During the abdication of Emperor Akihito on 30 April, and during the accession of Emperor Naruhito on 1 May, chamberlains carried the seals into the Hall of Pines, where they were placed on tables near the reigning Emperor.

== History ==
The history of the Privy Seal of Japan dates back to the Nara period. Although it was originally made from copper, it was manufactured from stone in 1868 (Meiji) and later, was made from pure gold.

If the State Seal or the Privy Seal are illegally reproduced, the penalty is at least two years or more of terminable penal servitude according to the first clause of Article 164 of the Criminal Code of Japan.

== See also ==
- National seals of Japan
- Lord Keeper of the Privy Seal of Japan
- Heirloom Seal of the Realm (China)
- National Seals of the Republic of China
- Seal of the State Council of the People's Republic of China
- Seal of South Korea
