= National seals of the Republic of China =

National symbols of the Republic of China

Seal of the Republic of China 中華民國之璽
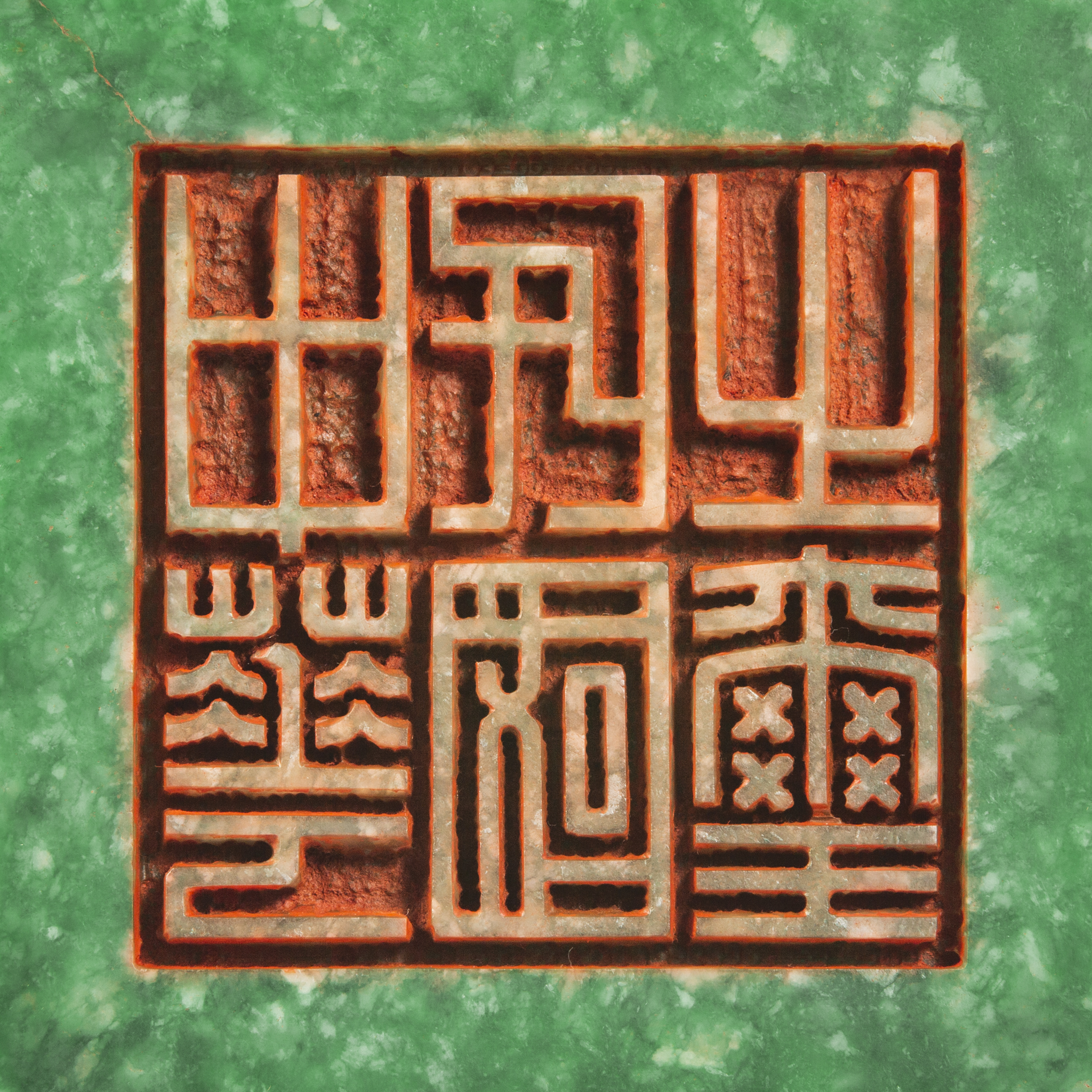

Versions
- Adopted: 10 October 1929; 96 years ago
- Motto: 中華民國之璽 中華 民國 之璽
- Use: Official seal of the state

Seal of the president of the Republic of China 中華民國總統之印
- Adopted: May 1948; 77 years ago
- Motto: 總統㞢印 總統 㞢印
- Use: Seal of the president

Seal of Honour 榮典之璽
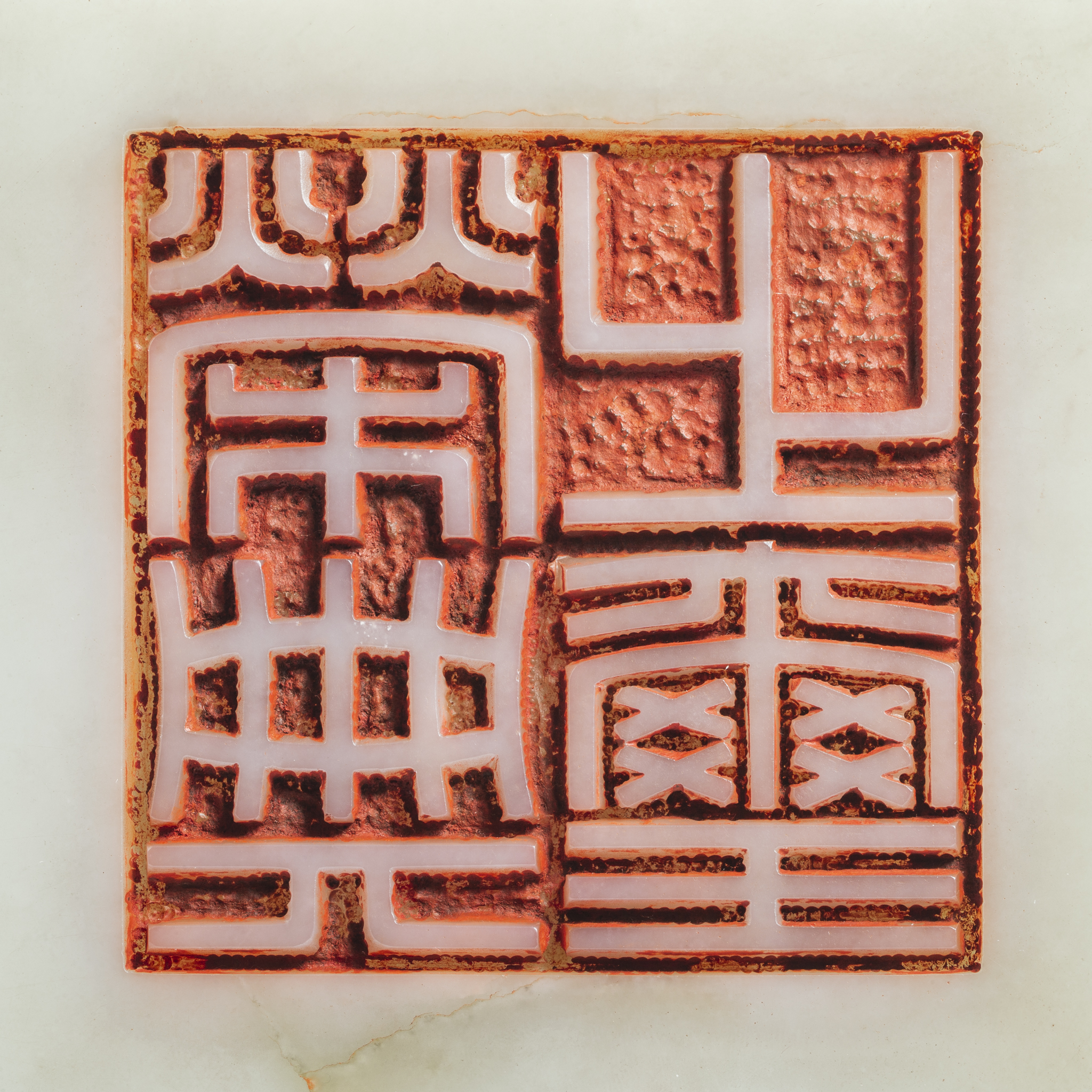

Versions
- Adopted: 1 July 1931; 94 years ago
- Motto: 榮典之璽 榮典 之璽
- Use: Conferring of honours

The National seals of the Republic of China are the official seals of the Republic of China (Taiwan). The Seal of Honour is used by the head of state in the conferring of honours.

== Design and measurements ==
The Seal of the Republic of China is made of green jadeite and weighs 3.2 kilograms (7.1 lb). It is 10 centimetres (3.9 in) in height, with 4.3 cm being the height of the body. The face of the seal is 13.3 cm square. Its inscription 中華民國之璽 is written in seal script in vertical writing, with 中華, 民國 and 之璽 written from right to left. The national emblem (Blue Sky with a White Sun) is engraved on top of the knob, decorated with a sapphire blue silk cordon.

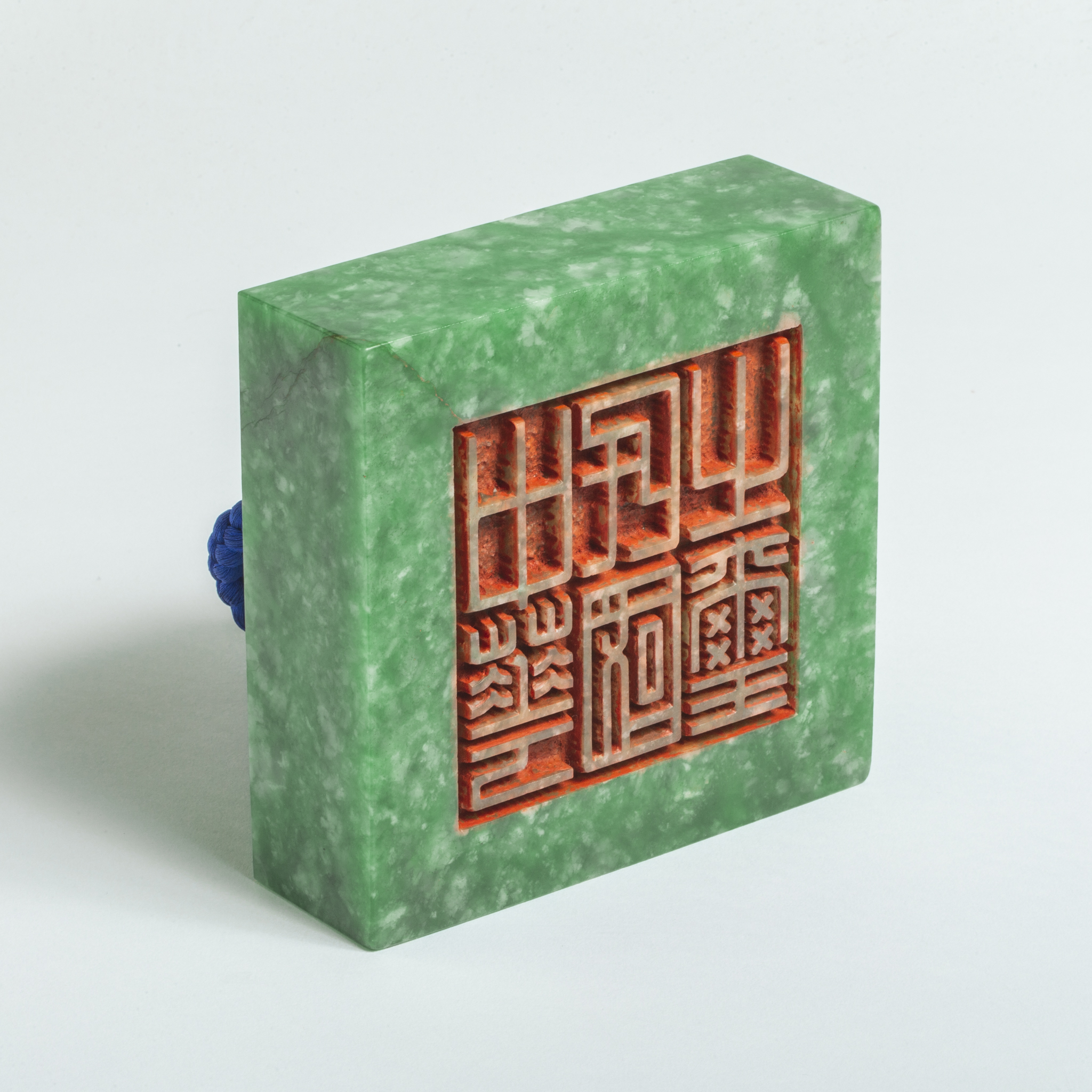

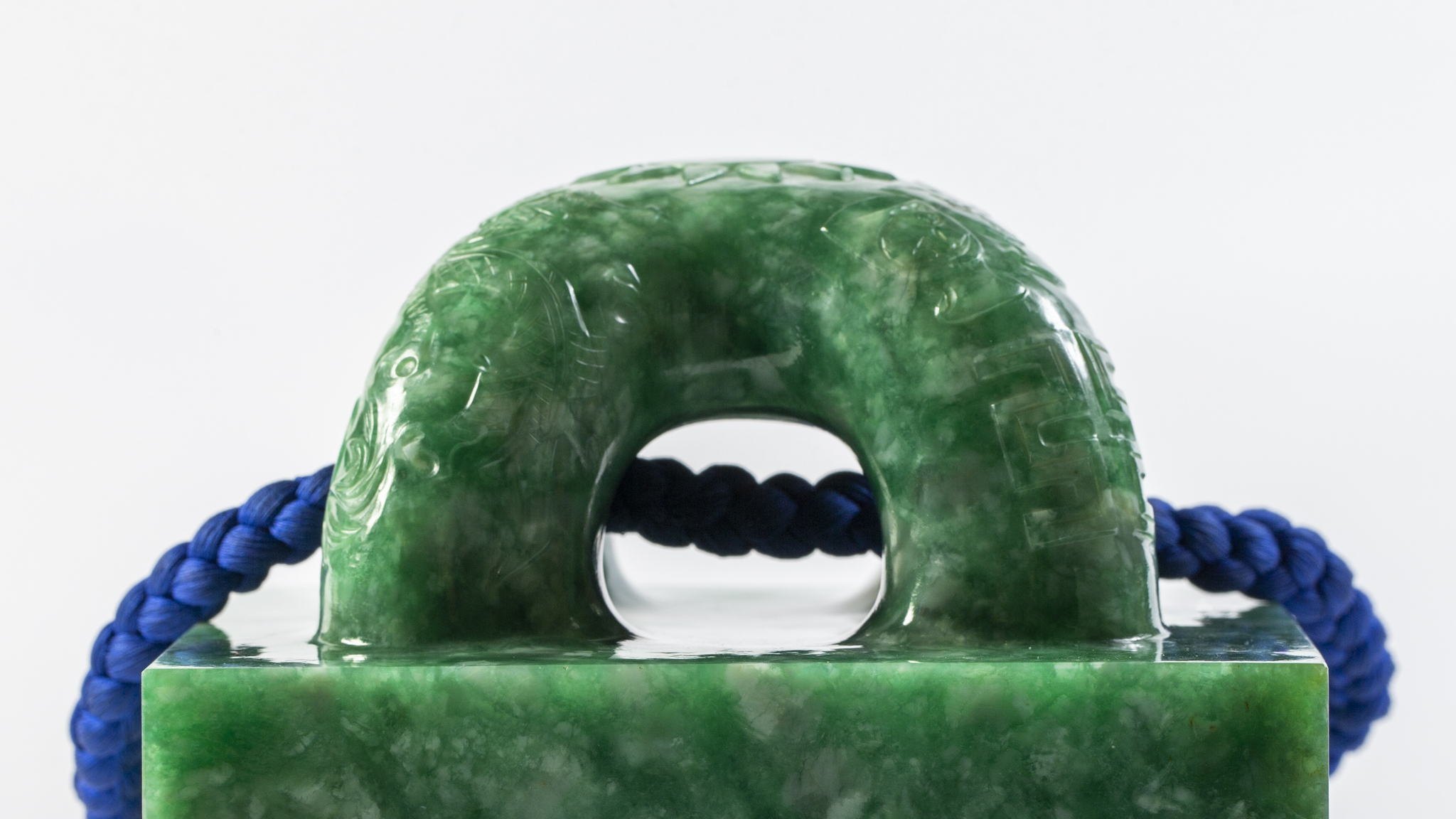

The Seal of Honour is made of white nephrite and weighs 4.3 kg. It is 11.1 cm in height, with 4.6 cm being the height of the body. The face of the seal is 13.6 cm square. Its inscription 榮典之璽 is written in seal script in vertical writing, with 榮典 and 之璽 written from right to left. The national emblem is engraved on top of the knob, and the sun, a dragon, and cloud iridescence are engraved on its sides. It is decorated with a sapphire blue silk cordon.

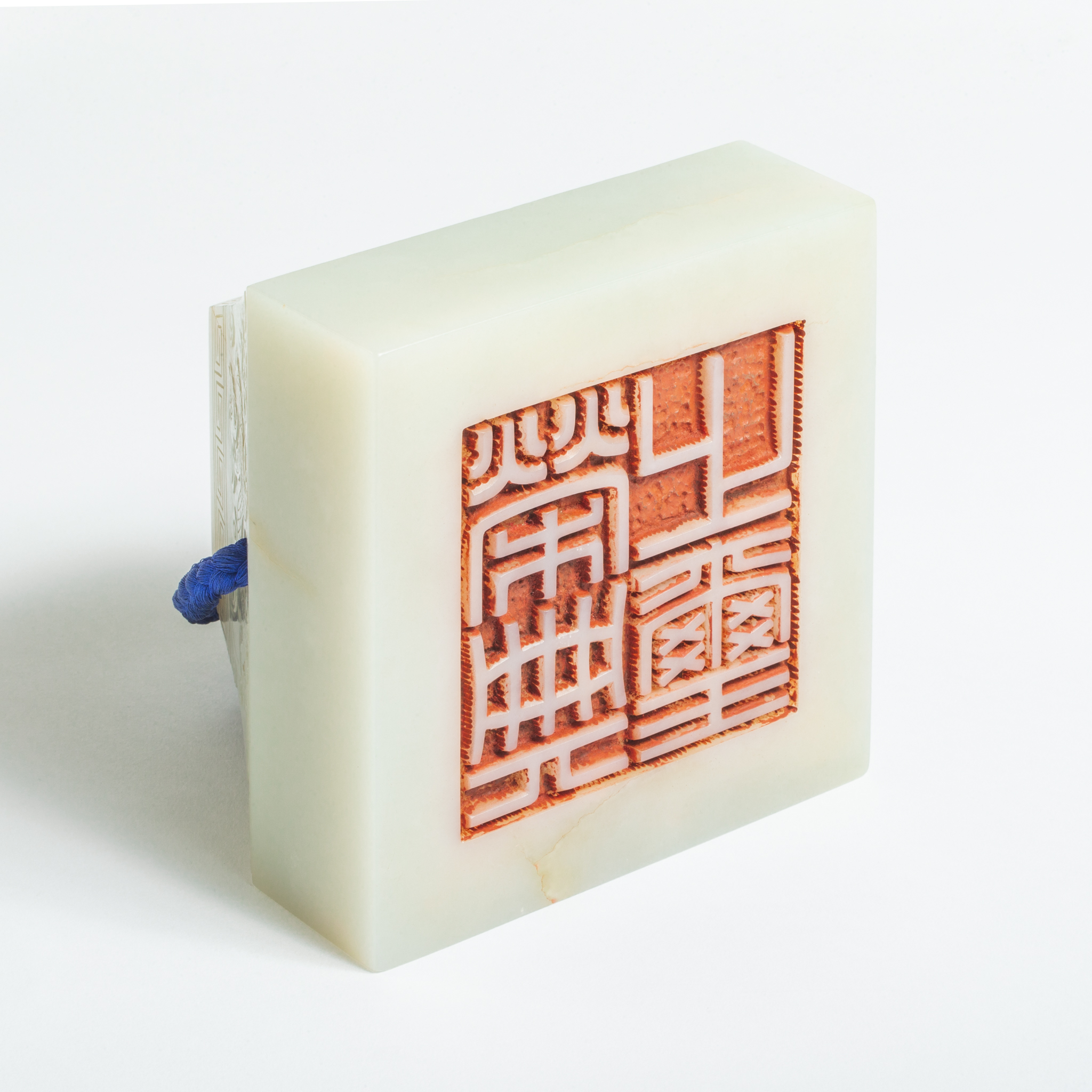

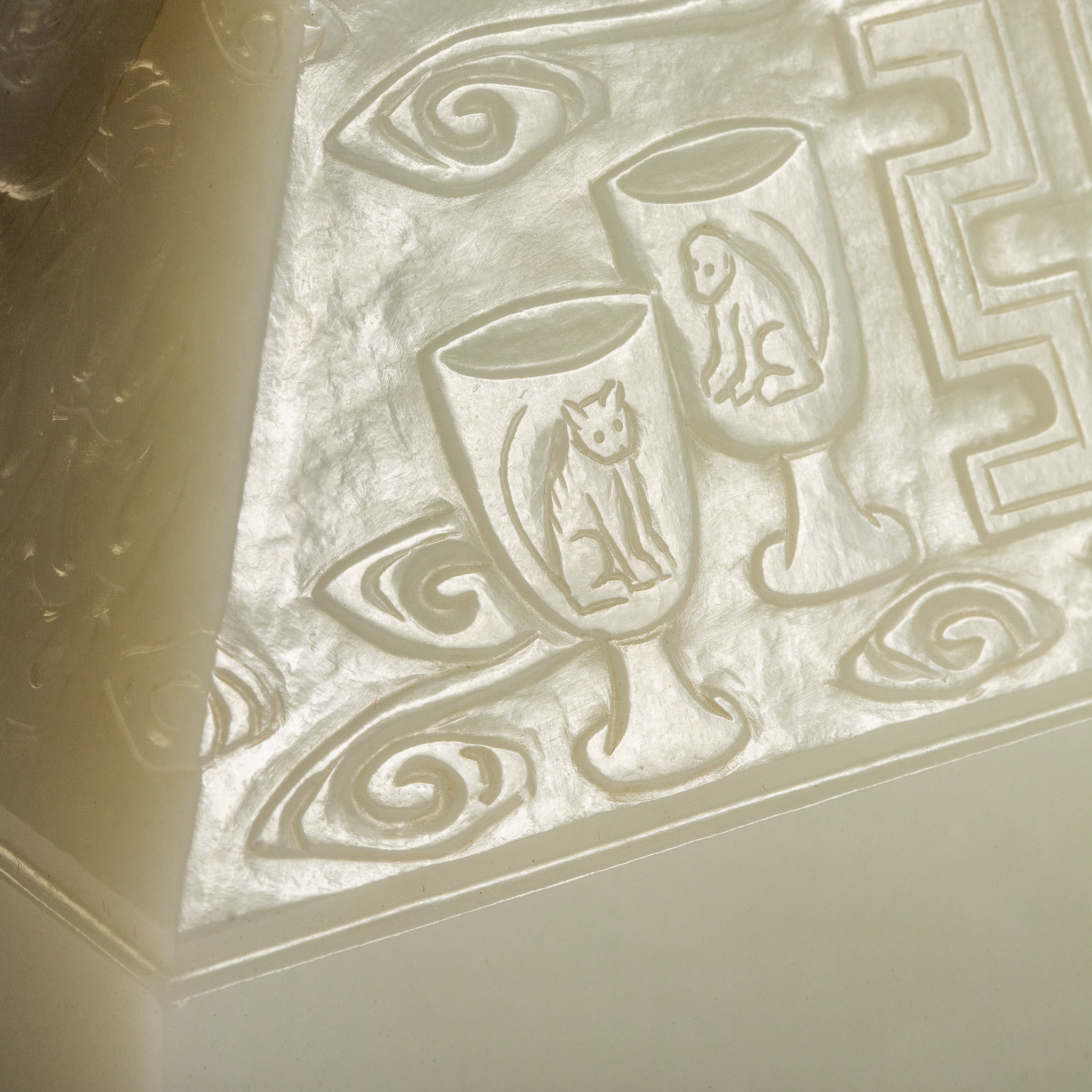

In May 1946, when there was a misconception that the insignia engraved on the seals was the emblem of the Kuomintang (rather than the near-identical national emblem), the President of the Examination Yuan Tai Chi-t'ao explained, "the Father of the Nation [Sun Yat-sen] designated the Blue Sky with a White Sun as the National Emblem, of which the deep and broad meaning is apparent. The Three Principles of the People is the implementation of the Blue Sky with a White Sun, and by the interpretation of the heavenly mandate and the popular will, Blue Sky with a White Sun is the body of the Grand Impartiality; the cultivation of personal integrity and the implementation of virtues are all modelled after the Blue Sky with a White Sun. I have followed the Father of the Nation for years and was present at the adoption of the seals by the Nationalist Government. Hence I leave this brief record for the worthy of later ages."

The ceremonial stand and tray are constructed of Taiwan incense cedar (calocedrus formosana) and beech wood, modelled after the Ding, a traditional ritual vessel. Carved on the stand are ruyi, a traditional auspicious ornament, and Formosan lilies, which symbolize resilient vitality, good governance, social peace, and national prosperity.

== History ==
=== Beiyang Government ===
In December 1914, the Government of the Chinese Republic passed the National Seals Act based on the 1914 Constitution, adopting three national seals. The first, known as the Seal of the Republic of China, was used in the national ceremonies and exchanges of letters of credence, etc. The second, the Seal of Investiture (封策之璽), was used in the investiture of nobilities and appointment of offices. The third, the Seal of Honour, was used in the conferring of medals and other documents of honour.

=== Adoption by the Nationalist Government ===
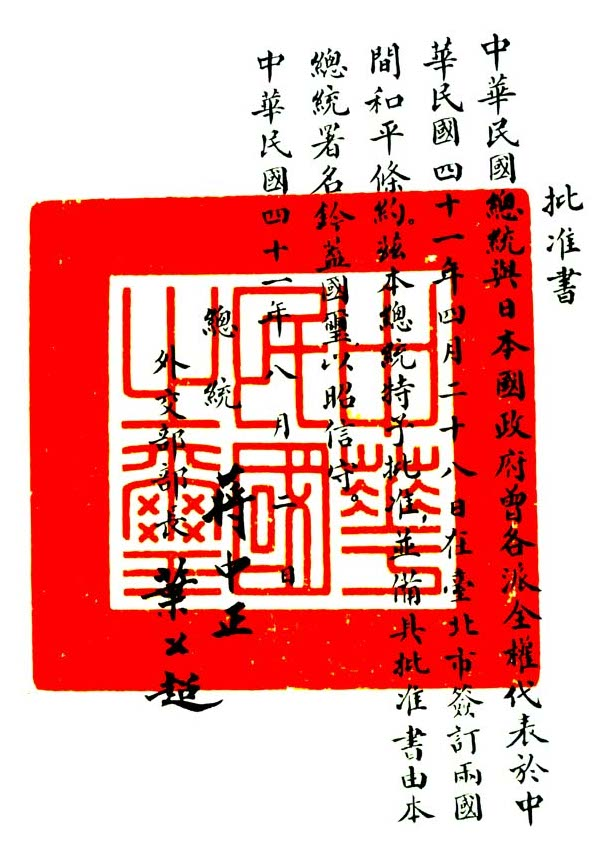
The Seal of the Republic of China is affixed to the instrument of ratification of 1952 Sino-Japanese Peace Treaty.

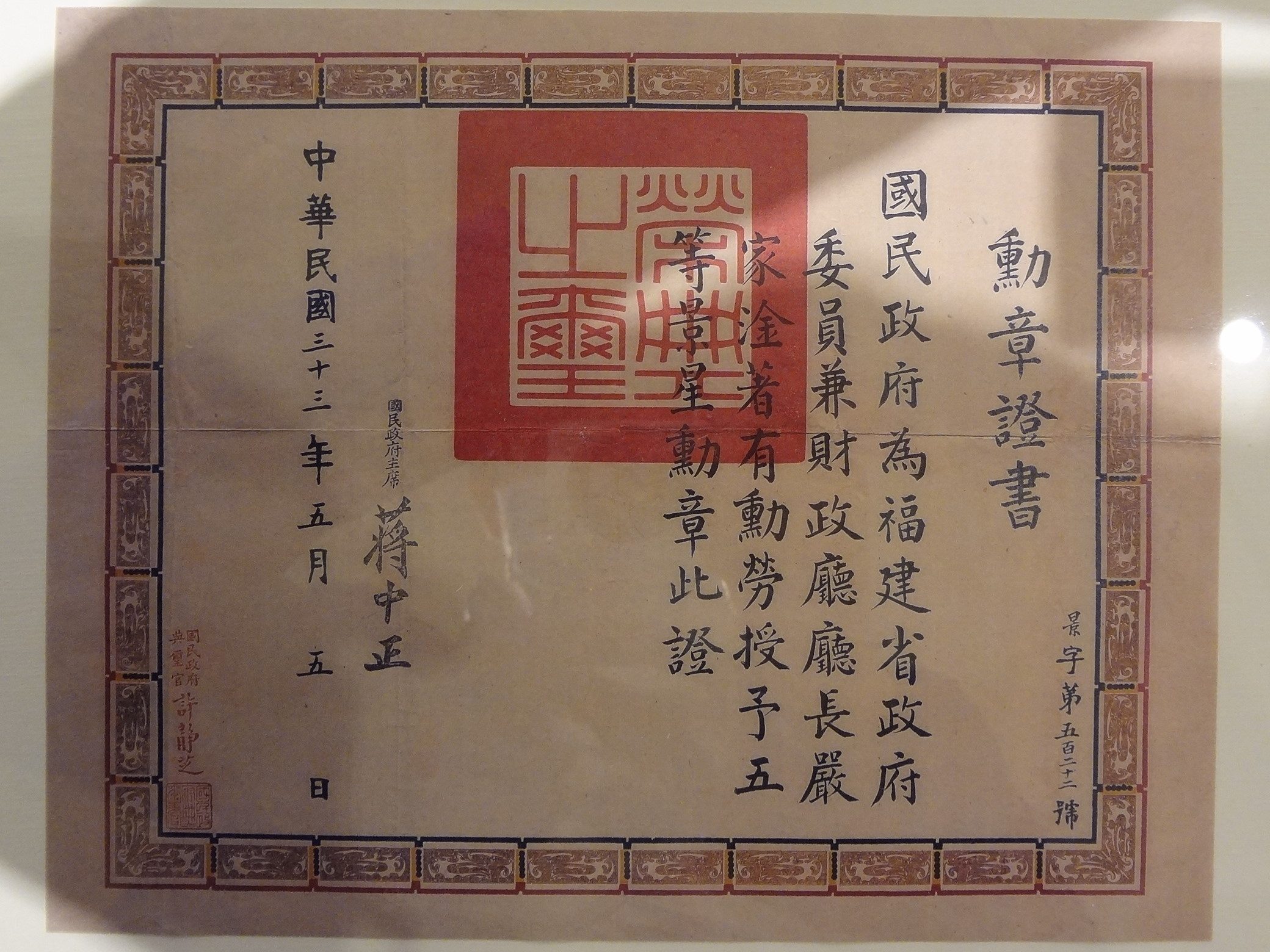
The Seal of Honour is affixed to the certificate of medal.

On 2 November 1928, the fifth meeting of the National Government of the Republic of China resolved that a seal of the Republic of China should be engraved. In May 1929, Chief Commander of the Eighth Army Chen Chi-tang ordered the procurement of two jades from Burma and offered them to the Nationalist Government. One of the jades was carved by the Printing and Casting Bureau under the National Government's Department of Civic Affairs and adopted as the Seal of the Republic of China on 10 October 1929; the other was carved into the seal of the Kuomintang.

Chin Shu-jen, chairman of the Sinkiang Provincial Government, ordered Chen Chi-shan, magistrate of Hotan, to search for jade materials from the locals. In July 1930, Sinkiang delegates in Nanking offered the nephrite jade to the Nationalist Government. Designed and carved by the Printing and Casting Bureau, the Seal of Honour was received by Chiang Kai-shek, chairman of the Nationalist Government, in person on 1 January 1931 and was adopted on 1 July in the same year.

On 20 May 1948, with the promulgation of the Constitution of the Republic of China, the inaugural president Chiang Kai-shek took office in Nanking. Head of the First Bureau of the Office of the President was concurrently appointed to the post of Keeper of the Seals, who was, under the command of the secretary general to president, responsible for safekeeping the two national seals and security during imprinting.

On 7 December 1949, when the Republic of China Government decided to relocate its seat to Taipei, Pang Hsiang, who had been appointed the head of First Bureau, stayed in Hong Kong and refused to take office. Chiang, who had resigned from the presidency, assigned Wang Wei-shih and Chu Ta-chang to be in charge of the relocation and to secretly carry with them the Seal of the Republic of China and the presidential seal to Taiwan in advance. For fear that the seals might fall into the communist hands, Wang and Chu boarded a military aircraft to Hainan Island on the same day, and kept the seals under their pillows during their 2-day stay at a hotel, as bandits ran rampant. On 11 December, they were escorted by an ROC Air Force aircraft, upon arrival at the Chiayi Airport, took an overnight train to Taipei and carried the seals to the Grand Hotel, which was a temporary office of the government, and then to the Taipei Guest House. Separately, Chin Hsiao-yi was entrusted by Cheng Yan-fen, secretary-general of the Kuomintang, with the transferral of the Seal of Honour and the seal of the Kuomintang to Taipei. When Chiang resumed presidency on 1 March 1950, Wang and Chu passed the seals onto the deputy head of the First Bureau Tsao Sheng-fen. Thus the use of the national seals resumed in Taiwan.

In January 1975, the First Bureau circulated to government agencies the Illustrations and Descriptions of the Seal of the Republic of China and the Seal of Honour, with the depiction of the seals in colour and Chinese and English descriptions of their materials, measurements and use.

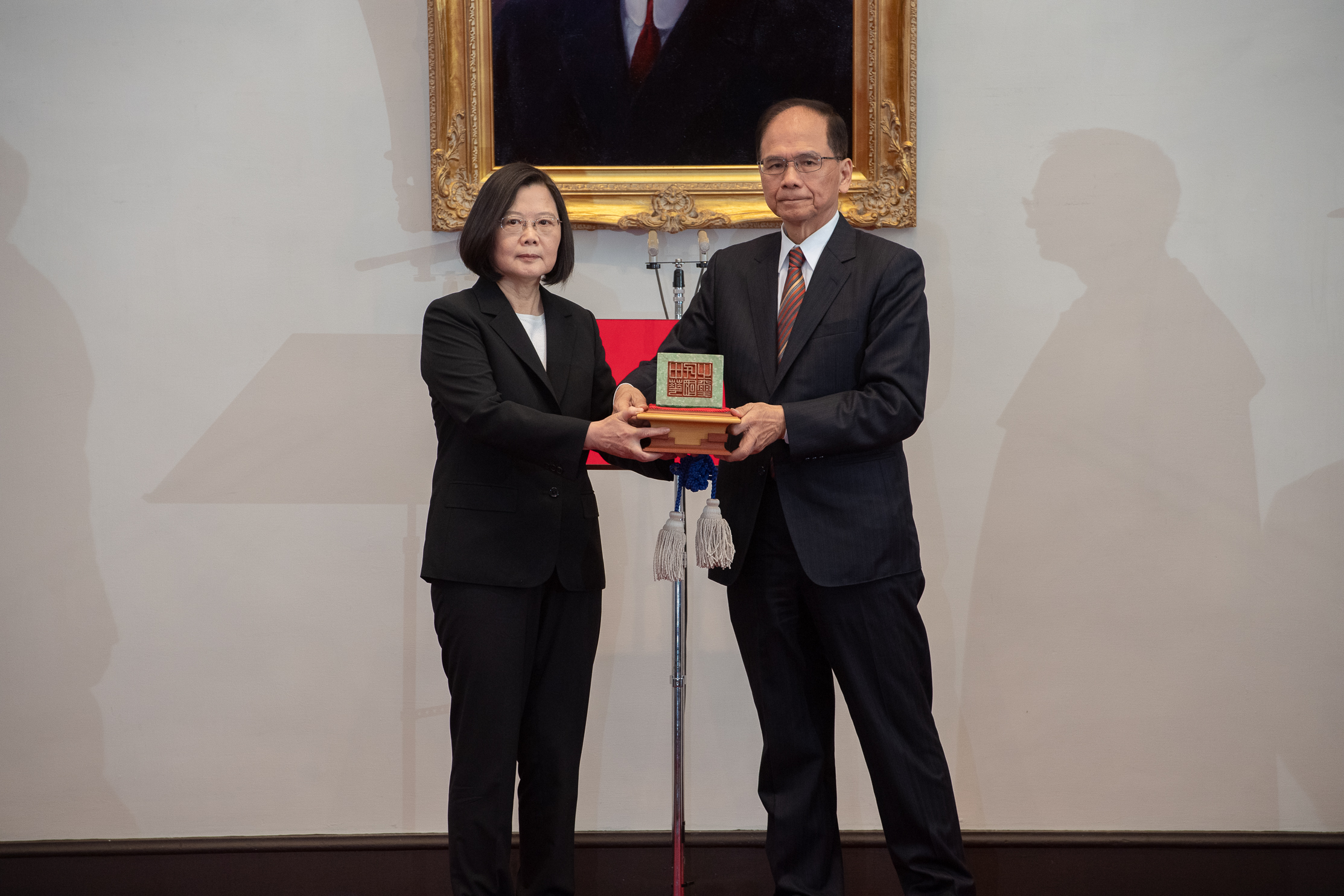
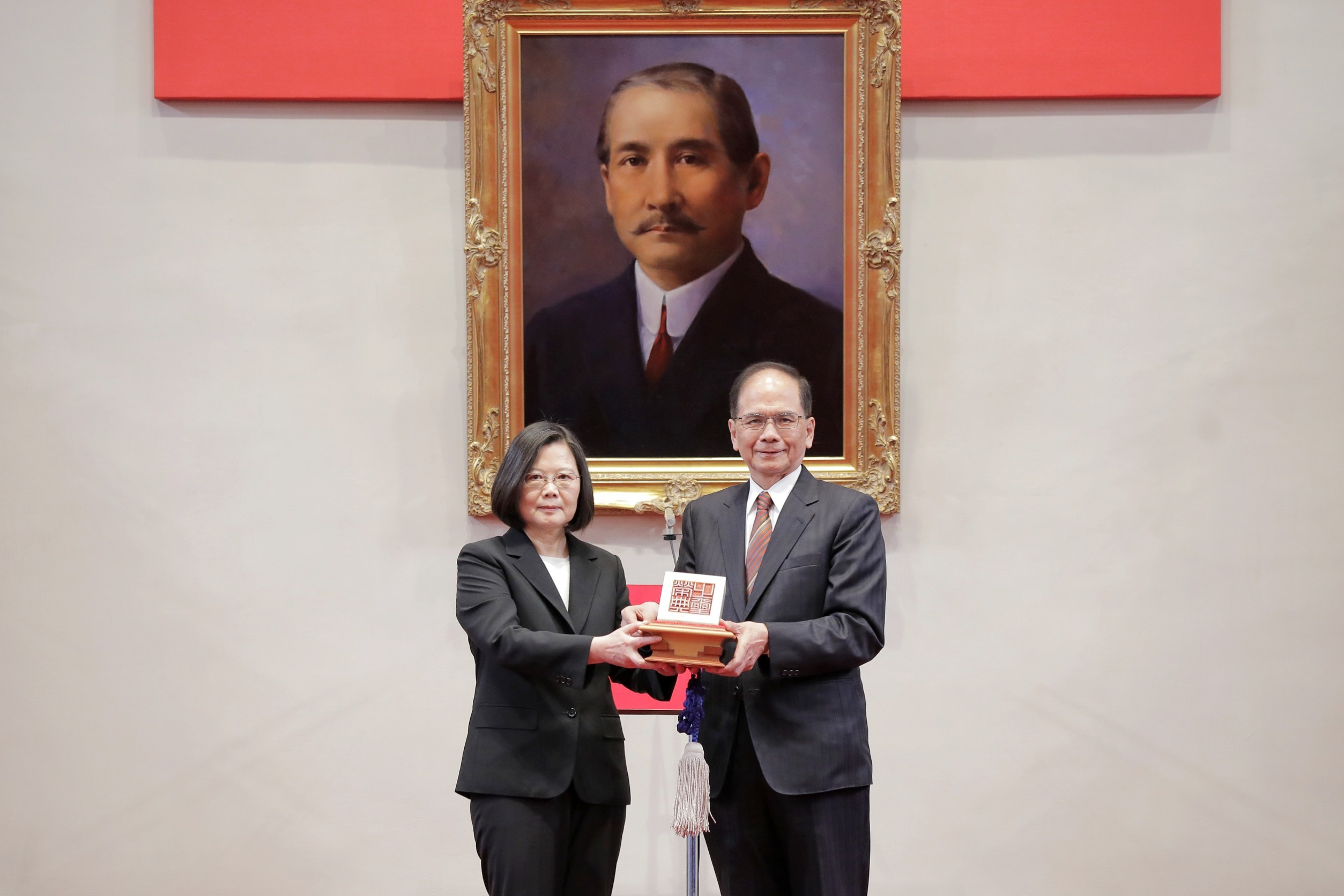
President Tsai Ing-wen receiving the Seal of the Republic of China (top) and the Seal of Honour (bottom) from Yu Shyi-kun, president of the Legislative Yuan in 2020

Prior to the amendment to the Office of the President Organisation Act on 24 January 1996, the national seals had been kept in an iron made safe in an air raid shelter fortress of the Taiwan Garrison Command; the staff had to visit the fortress whenever they needed to stamp on documents. Following the amendment, the post of Keeper of the Seals was abolished and the responsibility of safekeeping the national seals was transferred to the Imprinting Officer under the Second Bureau of the Presidential Office, and the seals were moved to be kept in a safe inside the Presidential Office Building. The Imprinting Officer is also responsible for keeping the presidential seal, as well as those of the vice president, the premier and the ministers.

Prior to 2000, article 5 of the Credential Act (印信條例) stipulated the president of the republic shall receive the national seals and the presidential seal from a representative of the National Assembly. This symbolises the transition of the authority and administration of the state. In 2000, an amendment to the act added that the president of the Legislative Yuan should be responsible when the National Assembly was not in session. Following the abolishment of the National Assembly, the president of the Legislative Yuan grants the seals to the president at the presidential inauguration.

Wooden stands and trays for the seals were first used at the 2020 presidential inauguration. It was designed and crafted by Professor Huang Chun-Chieh of the Department of Wood Science and Design, National Pingtung University of Science and Technology.

== Use ==
The Seal of the Republic of China is the official seal of the state. It is used for marking credentials, instruments of ratification, instruments of acceptance, full powers, exequaturs, consular commissions, and so on.

The Seal of Honour is the official seal with which the president, as the head of state, confers honours and decorations. It is used for stamping medal certificates, citations, commendatory plaques, and other such items.

Special care is to be taken when using the national seal, which is done in the form of rubbing rather than stamping. To mark documents, they are placed face-up, then the faces are covered with cinnabar oil ink. The document is then placed face-down on the face of the seal, and then pressure is applied evenly on the back of the sheet.

== See also ==
- Seal of the People's Government of the People's Republic of China
- Heirloom Seal of the Realm (Imperial Seal of China)
- Seal of South Korea
- Privy Seal of Japan
- State Seal of Japan
