= Seal of the People's Government of the People's Republic of China =

Former symbol of the People's Republic of China

Seal of the Central People's Government of the People's Republic of China 中华人民共和国中央人民政府之印
- Armiger: People's Republic of China
- Adopted: 31 October 1949
- Relinquished: May 1959
- Motto: 中華人民共和國中央人民政府之印; Zhōnghuá Rénmín Gònghéguó Zhōngyāng Rénmín Zhèngfǔ zhī yìn; "Seal of the Central People's Government of the People's Republic of China"; 中華人民共 和國中央人 民政府之印
- Use: Official seal (1949–1959); Museum exhibit (1959–present)

The Seal of the Central People's Government of the People's Republic of China (Chinese: 中华人民共和国中央人民政府之印), or the Founding Seal (Chinese: 开国大印), was the national seal of the People's Republic of China from 1949 to 1959. It is no longer in use, and is kept in the National Museum of China.

The seal was designed by Zhang Yuecheng. Earlier in 1949, Zhang Yuecheng would carve the seals for Zhou Enlai and Zhu De, and the seal of the Beijing Municipal People's Government. Zhang Yuecheng was recommended by Qi Yanming to design "The Seal of the Central Government of the People's Republic of China". Zhang then submitted four different designs with four different typefaces for the print of the seal, these were made in the clerical script, the Song, Han seal, and Qin seal. After these designs were finalised, Chairman Mao Zedong selected the design with Song.

== Design ==
The Seal of the People's Government of the People's Republic of China is cast from brass, with a little ammonium added. The seal has a square base, and a cylindrical handle on the top. The height of the seal base is 2.5 centimetres, and the handle is 10.9 centimetres tall, totalling 13.4 centimetres in height. Its base is 4.5 centimetres wide and 4.5 centimetres long, the perimeter is 18 centimetres. There are no obvious patterns or symbols engraved on the seal other than the face, however there is a slight concave on the handle for better grip. Its inscription "The Seal of the People's Government of the People's Republic of China" (中華人民共和國中央人民政府之印") is written in the typeface Song, styled from right to left and from top to bottom.

== Timeline ==
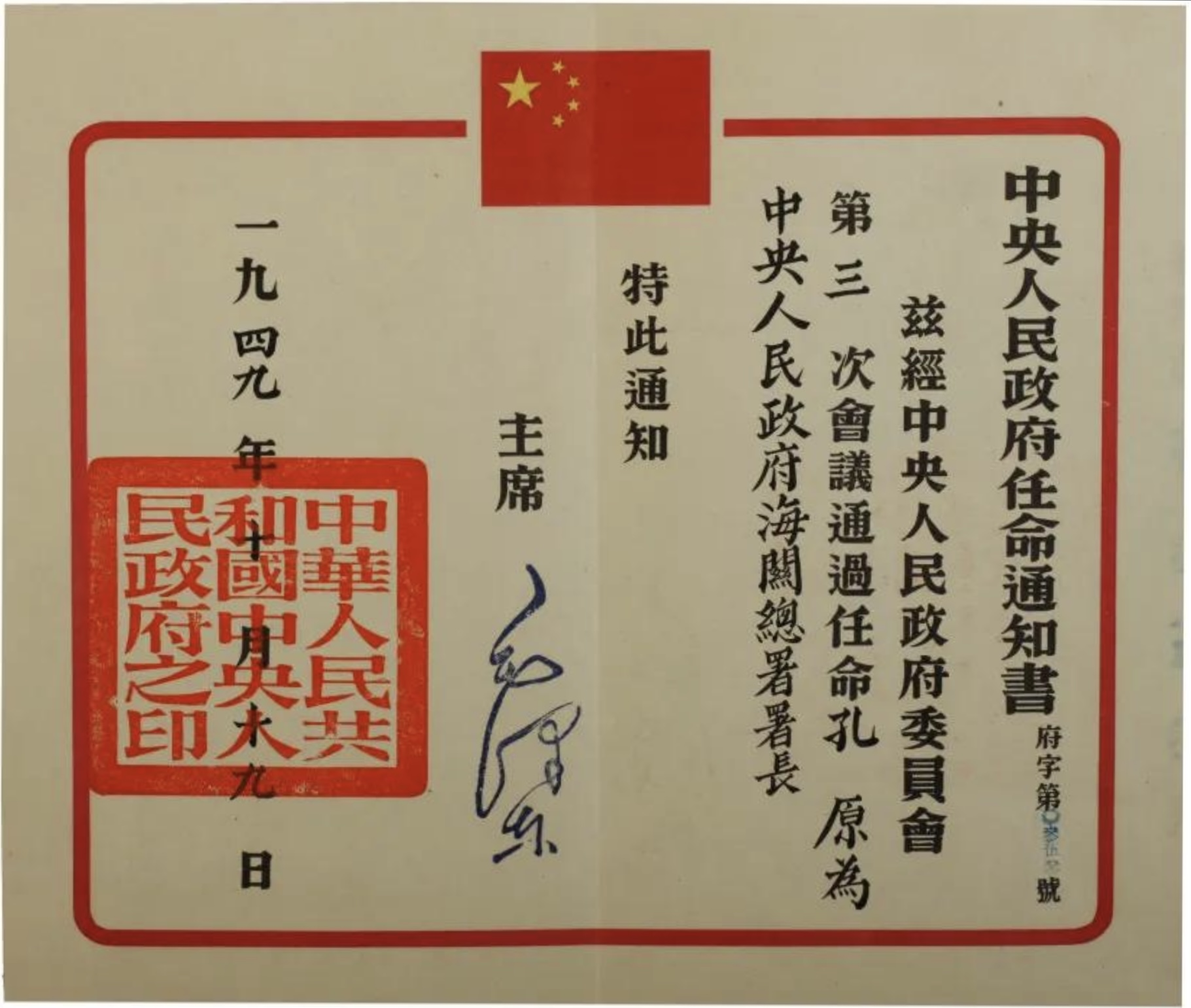
An official notice stamped by the National Seal—writ appointing Kong Yuan as inaugural Minister of the General Administration of Customs.

- 11 June 1949: Zhou Enlai asked Chen Shutong to find a seal maker, regarding the making of seals for the government. Together with Qi Yanming, Chen Shutong decided to recommended Zhang Yuecheng as the official seal maker.
  - A few days later: Zhou Enlai gathered Zhang and some experts to discuss and decide the design of the National Seal.
- 27 September 1949: After several months of discussion, four potential seal designs were picked. The four designs mainly differs in font, there was the clerical script, the Song, Han seal, and the Qin seal.
- 1 October 1949: The Central People's Government of the People's Republic of China was established and was set as the cabinet. Central People's Government of the People's Republic of China controlled all the seal used to pass laws, commands, and other authorities proclaimed by the president or the cabinet, including the National Seal.
- 27 October 1949: The Song seal design was approved by Mao Zedong and Zhou Enlai, immediately after the national seal's bill was paid and the making started.
- 31 October 1949: The National Seal was finished and handed to the government.
- September 1949: The cabinet was changed from the Central People's Government of the People's Republic of China to the State Council of the People's Republic of China, and together all the seals are transferred to the new cabinet.
- May 1959: The National Seal was retired by the General Office of the State Council and was sent to the National Museum of China.

== See also ==
- Heirloom Seal of the Realm (Imperial Seal of China)
- National Seals of the Republic of China
- Seal of South Korea
- Privy Seal of Japan
- State Seal of Japan
