= Orders, decorations, and medals of Japan =

System of honours and decorations in Japan

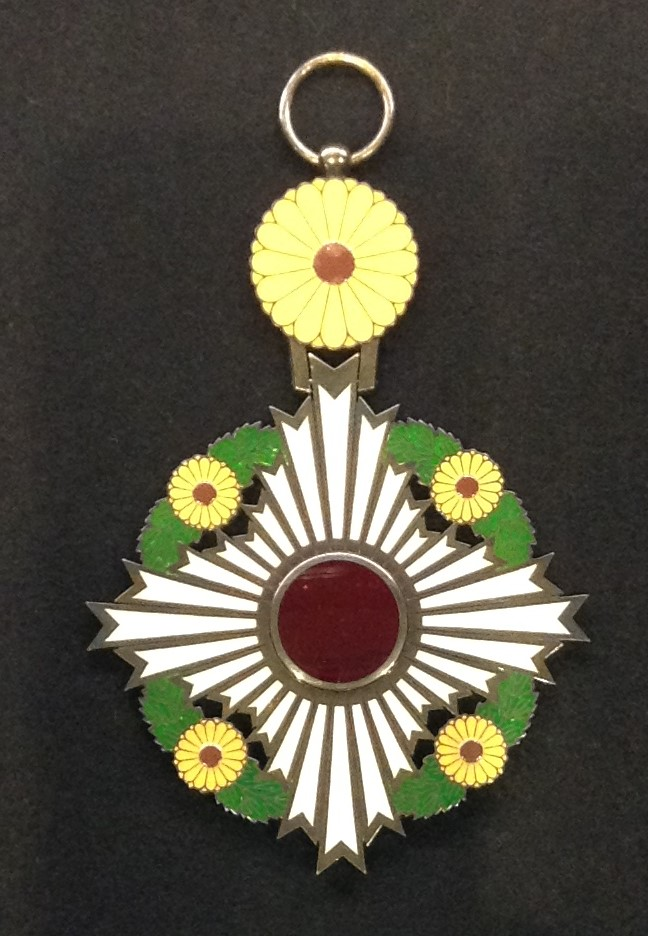
Grand Cordon of the Supreme Order of the Chrysanthemum

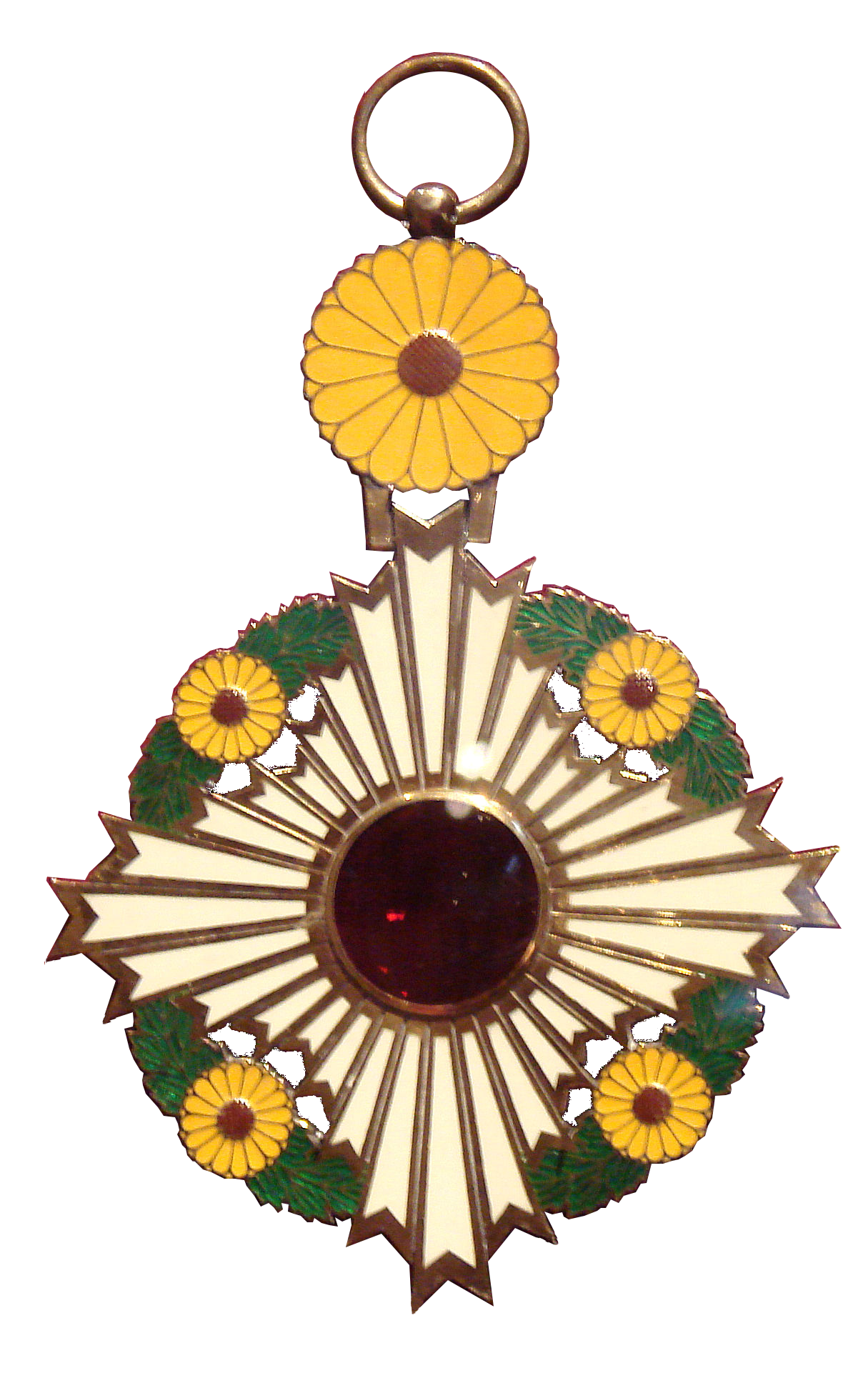
Order of the Chrysanthemum of Victor Emmanuel III of Italy

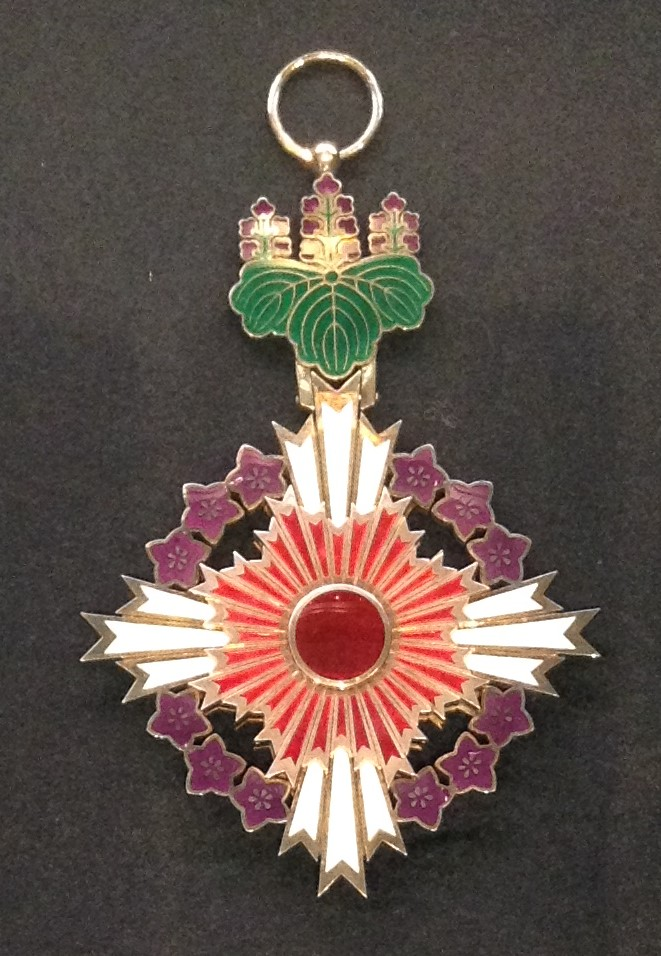
Grand Cordon of the Order of the Paulownia Flowers

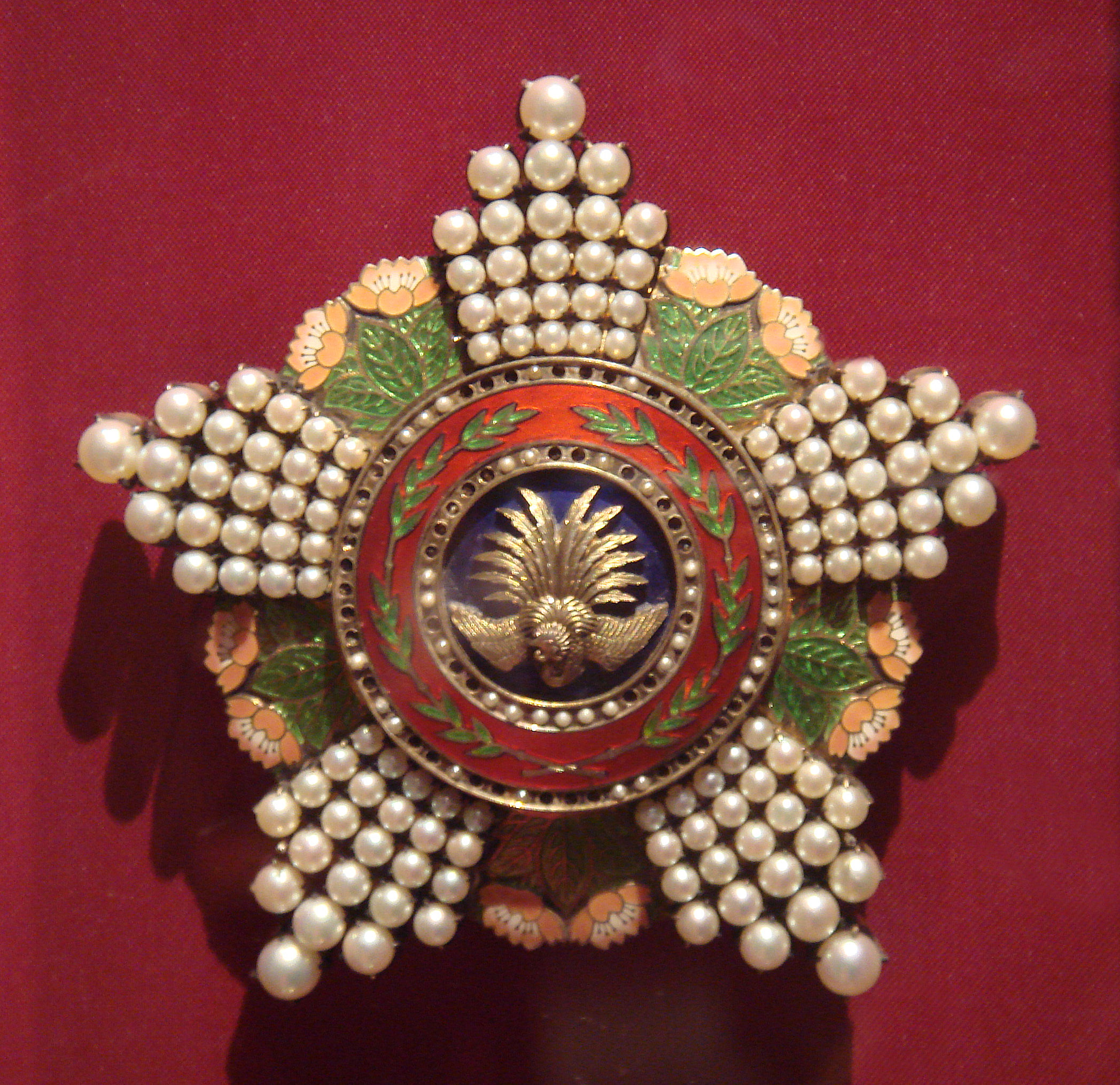
Order of the Precious Crown

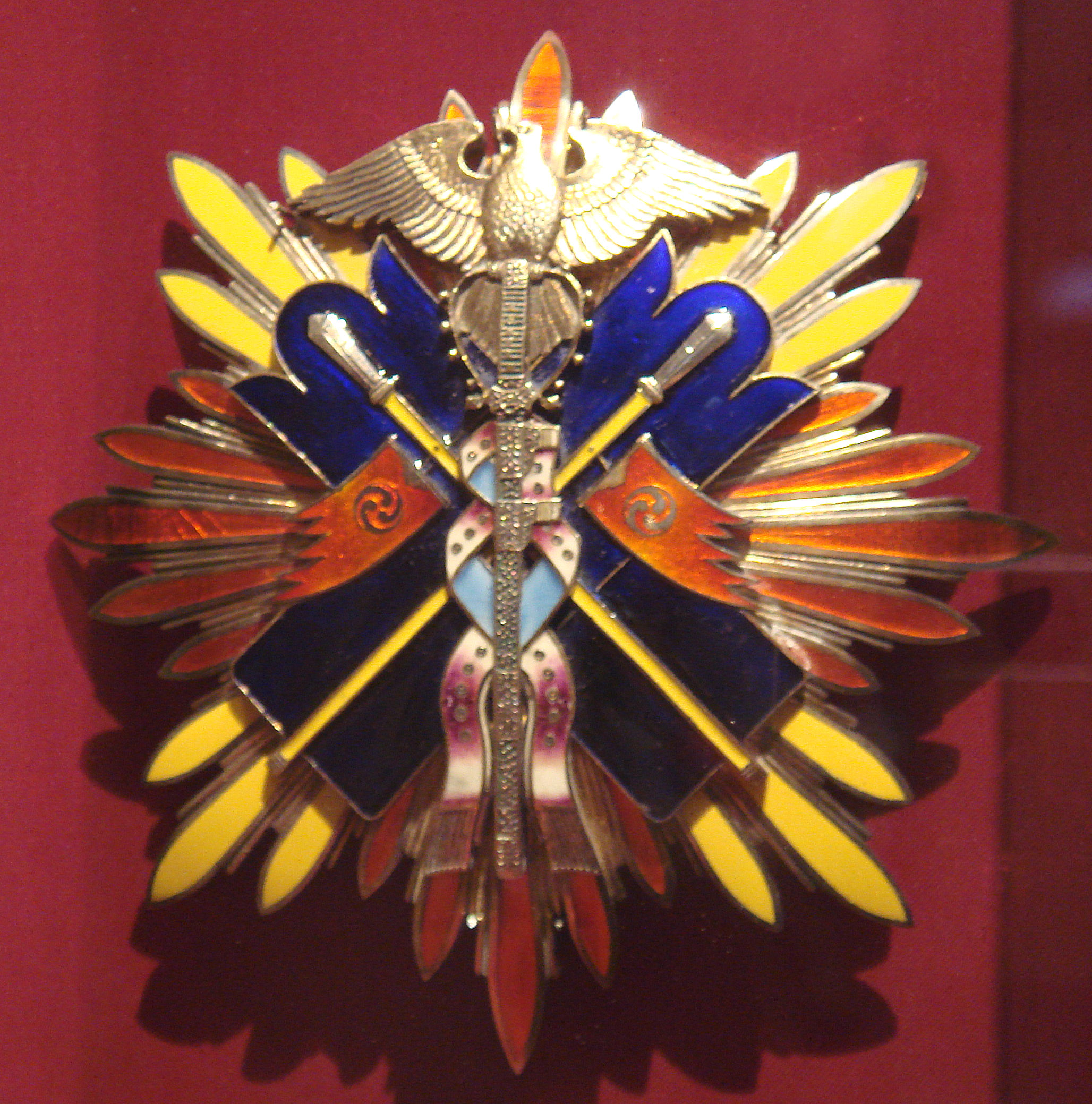
Order of the Golden Kite, 1st and 2nd class plaque

The Japanese honours system is a system implemented for rewarding awards to Japanese and non-Japanese persons for their achievements and service to Japan. The Emperor is the head of the honors system in Japan.

Established during the 1870s shortly after the Meiji Restoration, it was modelled on European systems of orders and decorations. The first order, the Imperial Order of Meiji, was established in 1875, and was later renamed as the Order of the Rising Sun.

== Overview ==
Orders and decorations in Japan consist of the conferral of honours and awards, medals, and titles (the latter abolished in 1947), which were established during the Meiji period as a system for the state to recognise individuals' achievements.

The Decoration Bureau of the Cabinet Office is responsible for administrative duties relating to the conferment of awards, research on the honours system, and planning. The awarding of honours is one of the prescribed constitutional functions of the Emperor of Japan, with the advice of the Cabinet.

== Recommendation system ==
Since 2003, the Government of Japan through the Decoration Bureau uses a recommendation system in which members of the public can recommend candidates for the honours.

=== Process ===
==== Recommendation from the public ====
1. A recommender from the public submits an application to the Decoration Bureau. One recommender and two approvers are required for the application to be processed, with applications received throughout the year.
2. Once an application is approved for review, the Decoration Bureau and relevant ministries and agencies conducts research and development.

==== Recommendations from ministries and agencies ====
1. Ministries and/or government agencies submits an application to the Decoration Bureau.
2. Request for discussions regarding the candidates at Cabinet meetings submitted.
3. Information about potential recipients reported to the Emperor.
4. Official announcement in media.

== Current Orders ==
=== Supreme Order of the Chrysanthemum ===
Established in 1876, this is the premier order of Japan, originally in one class (Grand Cordon) and expanded to two classes (Collar; Grand Cordon) in 1888.

- Collar – The highest possible honour that may be conferred. The Collar is worn by only the reigning Emperor, and is normally awarded to only foreign monarchs as a courtesy. Before 1947, the Collar was also conferred upon extremely eminent Cabinet ministers, senior members of the Imperial family and certain senior military officers of the rank of Marshal. It may be posthumously awarded to extremely distinguished Prime Ministers of Japan; the last such award was to Shinzo Abe in 2022.
- Grand Cordon – Typically conferred upon royals of the Imperial House of Japan, foreign royalty who are not reigning monarchs, certain foreign non-royal Heads of State, and select Japanese Prime Ministers. Until 1947, the Grand Cordon was often conferred upon eminent military officers of the rank of Marshal. Often conferred posthumously.

=== Order of the Paulownia Flowers ===
Established in 1888 as a Special Grand Cordon to the Order of the Rising Sun, it was later made a separate order in 2003. Ordinarily the highest regularly awarded honour, it is conferred in a single class (Grand Cordon); typically awarded to Japanese prime ministers, senior statesmen, select foreign heads of government, distinguished cabinet ministers and jurists. Until 1947, it was also awarded to distinguished military officers of the rank of General or higher, or its equivalents.

=== Order of the Rising Sun ===
The order was established in 1875 as Japan's first order. Awarded in nine classes prior to 2003: The Grand Cordon of the order is typically awarded to foreign heads of government, chairpersons of prominent international organizations and leading politicians, business leaders and diplomats. The second class is typically conferred upon prominent academics, politicians and military officers. The third through sixth classes are ordinarily conferred upon individuals who have made significant contributions to Japan in varying degrees. The 7th and 8th classes of the Order were abolished in 2003, and the Special First Class of the Order was renamed the Order of the Paulownia Flowers.

- 1st Class: Grand Cordon
- 2nd Class: Gold and Silver Star
- 3rd Class: Gold Rays with Neck Ribbon
- 4th Class: Gold Rays with Rosette
- 5th Class: Gold and Silver Rays
- 6th Class: Silver Rays

=== Order of the Sacred Treasure ===
This order was established in 1888 as the Imperial Order of Meiji in eight classes. Since the revision of the honours system in 2003, the Order of the Sacred Treasure has been awarded to civil servants for their long-term contributions. They include government and local officials, military personnel, scholars of national universities, and school teachers. For example, from 2014, the former Chief of Staff, Joint Staff is awarded Grand Cordon of the Order of the Sacred Treasure at the age of 70. The 7th and 8th classes were abolished in 2003.

- 1st Class: Grand Cordon
- 2nd Class: Gold and Silver Star
- 3rd Class: Gold Rays with Neck Ribbon
- 4th Class: Gold Rays with Rosette
- 5th Class: Gold and Silver Rays
- 6th Class: Silver Rays

=== Order of Culture ===
Established in 1937, this is a single-class order of merit to honour those who have made outstanding contributions to Japanese culture. Japanese Nobel Laureates are awarded the Order of Culture.

=== Order of the Precious Crown ===
Established in 1888 in five classes, the order expanded to seven classes in 1896. The 7th class of the order was abolished sometime after the Second World War. It was initially awarded to select foreigners who were not eligible for a higher honour but subsequently awarded to only women. From 2003, with the opening of the Order of the Rising Sun to Japanese women, the order has been awarded to only foreign females.

- 1st Class: Grand Cordon
- 2nd Class: Peony Class
- 3rd Class: Butterfly Class
- 4th Class: Wisteria Class
- 5th Class: Apricot Class
- 6th Class: Ripple Class

=== Medals of Honour ===
Established in 1881, the Medals of Honour honour individuals who have made distinguished achievements in their respective fields of society. The different medal categories can be seen below.

- Medal with Red Ribbon
- Medal with Green Ribbon
- Medal with Yellow Ribbon
- Medal with Purple Ribbon
- Medal with Blue Ribbon
- Medal with Dark Blue Ribbon

=== Medals of current orders and their classes ===
The current types of Japanese orders, their classes and medals can be seen below.

Name (original name in Japanese above) and image	Remarks
大勲位菊花章 Supreme Order of the Chrysanthemum	The highest order of merit in Japan.
大勲位菊花章頸飾 Collar of the Supreme Order of the Chrysanthemum	The highest order of merit in Japan.
大勲位菊花大綬章 Grand Cordon of the Supreme Order of the Chrysanthemum	The highest order of merit in Japan.
桐花章 Order of the Paulownia Flowers	The Grand Cordon of the Order of the Rising Sun or the Grand Cordon of the Order of the Sacred Treasure is awarded to persons who have distinguished themselves through their service or achievements.
桐花大綬章 Grand Cordon of the Order of the Paulownia Flowers	The Grand Cordon of the Order of the Rising Sun or the Grand Cordon of the Order of the Sacred Treasure is awarded to persons who have distinguished themselves through their service or achievements.
旭日章 Order of the Rising Sun	Awarded to persons for their meritorious service to the state or the public.
旭日大綬章 Grand Cordon of the Order of the Rising Sun	Awarded to persons for their meritorious service to the state or the public.
旭日重光章 Order of the Rising Sun, Gold and Silver Star	Awarded to persons for their meritorious service to the state or the public.
旭日中綬章 Order of the Rising Sun, Gold Rays with Neck Ribbon	Awarded to persons for their meritorious service to the state or the public.
旭日小綬章 Order of the Rising Sun, Gold Rays with Rosette	Awarded to persons for their meritorious service to the state or the public.
旭日双光章 Order of the Rising Sun, Gold and Silver Rays	Awarded to persons for their meritorious service to the state or the public.
旭日単光章 Order of the Rising Sun, Silver Rays	Awarded to persons for their meritorious service to the state or the public.
瑞宝章 Order of the Sacred Treasure	Awarded to persons who have rendered years of meritorious service to the state or the public.
瑞宝大綬章 Grand Cordon of the Order of the Sacred Treasure	Awarded to persons who have rendered years of meritorious service to the state or the public.
瑞宝重光章 Order of the Sacred Treasure, Gold and Silver Star	Awarded to persons who have rendered years of meritorious service to the state or the public.
瑞宝中綬章 Order of the Sacred Treasure, Gold Rays with Neck Ribbon	Awarded to persons who have rendered years of meritorious service to the state or the public.
瑞宝小綬章 Order of the Sacred Treasure, Gold Rays with Rosette	Awarded to persons who have rendered years of meritorious service to the state or the public.
瑞宝双光章 Order of the Sacred Treasure, Gold and Silver Rays	Awarded to persons who have rendered years of meritorious service to the state or the public.
瑞宝単光章 Order of the Sacred Treasure, Silver Rays	Awarded to persons who have rendered years of meritorious service to the state or the public.
文化勲章 Order of Culture	Awarded to persons who have distinguished themselves in terms of cultural development.
宝冠章 Order of the Precious Crown	Only women are eligible for the award. The award is given in special cases, such as ceremonial decorations for female members of the Imperial Family or foreign nationals.
宝冠大綬章 Grand Cordon of the Order of the Precious Crown	Only women are eligible for the award. The award is given in special cases, such as ceremonial decorations for female members of the Imperial Family or foreign nationals.
宝冠牡丹章 Order of the Precious Crown, Peony Class	Only women are eligible for the award. The award is given in special cases, such as ceremonial decorations for female members of the Imperial Family or foreign nationals.
宝冠白蝶章 Order of the Precious Crown, Butterfly Class	Only women are eligible for the award. The award is given in special cases, such as ceremonial decorations for female members of the Imperial Family or foreign nationals.
宝冠藤花章 Order of the Precious Crown, Wisteria Class	Only women are eligible for the award. The award is given in special cases, such as ceremonial decorations for female members of the Imperial Family or foreign nationals.
宝冠杏葉章 Order of the Precious Crown, Apricot Class	Only women are eligible for the award. The award is given in special cases, such as ceremonial decorations for female members of the Imperial Family or foreign nationals.
宝冠波光章 Order of the Precious Crown, Ripple Class	Only women are eligible for the award. The award is given in special cases, such as ceremonial decorations for female members of the Imperial Family or foreign nationals.

== Conferral of decoration diplomas ==
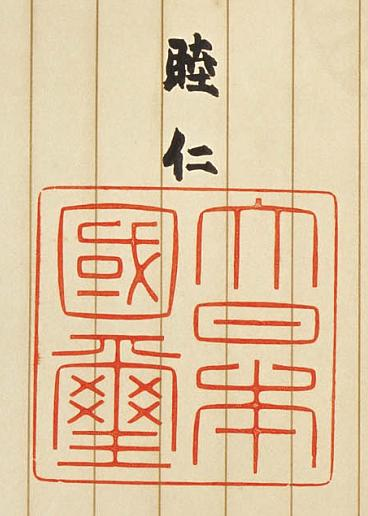
Emperor Meiji's signature and the State Seal of Japan. The State Seal was adopted in 1874 and is affixed to all decoration diplomas of conferred orders.

In addition to the decorations, the recipient to one of the orders is also awarded a decoration diploma. The diploma is a certificate bearing the name of the recipient, the name of the order awarded, the date of the award, the name of the awarding authority, etc., along with the State Seal of Japan. The text and content of the diploma according to the type of decoration. All the text in the diplomas is written vertically.

- For recipients of the Grand Cordon of the Supreme Order of the Chrysanthemum, Grand Cordon of the Order of the Paulownia Flowers, Grand Cordon of the Order of the Rising Sun, Grand Cordon of the Order of the Sacred Treasure, and the Order of Culture:

日本国天皇は　○ ○ ○ ○　に
　　○ ○ ○ ○　　を授与する
皇居においてみずから名を署し
璽をおさせる
御名国璽
令和○年○月○日
　　内閣総理大臣○○○○印
　　　内閣府賞勲局長○○○○印
第○○○○号

The Emperor of Japan will confer [name of the order]
to [name of recipient]. 
At the Imperial Palace, you will be asked to
sign and seal your name.
Imperial Seal[specify]                                                                                                                                                  
Reiwa YYYY MM DD
     Prime Minister [name and personal seal]
     Director-General, Cabinet Office Decoration Bureau [name and personal seal]
Number XXXX

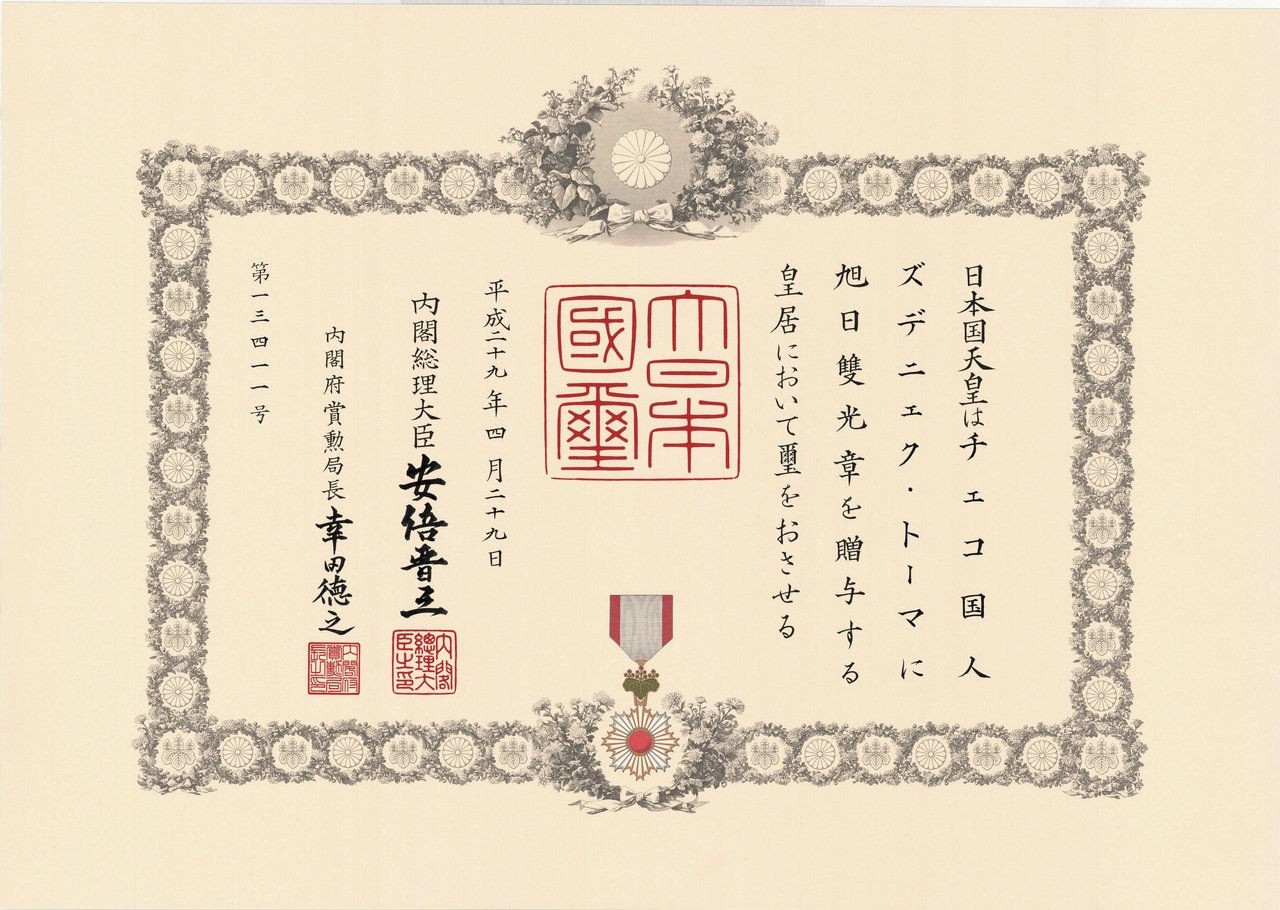
The Gold Rays with Neck Ribbon, Order of the Rising Sun conferred to Czech photographer Zdenek Toma in 2017

- For recipients of other orders and honours:

日本国天皇は○ ○ ○ ○に
　 ○ ○ ○ ○　を授与する
皇居において璽をおさせる
国璽
令和○年○月○日
　　 内閣総理大臣○○○○印
　　　　 内閣府賞勲局長○○○○印
第○○○○号

The Emperor of Japan will confer [name of the order]
to [name of recipient].
At the Imperial Palace, you will be asked to
sign and seal your name.
State Seal
Reiwa YYYY MM DD
     Prime Minister [name and personal seal]
     Director-General, Cabinet Office Decoration Bureau [name and personal seal]
Number XXXX

In cases where signature of the Emperor and State Seal is affixed at a location other than the Tokyo Imperial Palace, e.g., Akasaka Palace, the diplomas will reflect the change and use "Akasaka Palace" instead.

The National Printing Bureau, an independent administrative agency of the Government of Japan, handles papermaking and printing of the diplomas for the decoration. In addition to the text, signature, Imperial Seal, and State Seal mentioned above, the design of the awarded order is imprinted on the medal. This model is printed using the decalcomania technique. In this technique, a skilled craftsman manually adds colours to the transfer paper one by one, which takes several days. In addition, a chrysanthemum crest is printed just above the centre of the medal. This chrysanthemum crest was also created by applying pure gold powder after gold under-printing, and then performing blank pressing (embossing).

== Criteria for honours (Japanese nationals) ==
In order for Japanese nationals to be awarded, they must meet certain criteria specified by the Government of Japan.

Criteria for the conferral of orders
Grand Cordon, Supreme Order of the Chrysanthemum	The highest conferred honour given for exceptional merit
Grand Cordon, Order of the Paulownia Flowers	For an exemplary and distinguished level of merit
Grand Cordon, Order of the Rising Sun	For highly distinguished national and/or public service
Grand Cordon, Order of the Sacred Treasure	For long and distinguished national and/or public service
Second - sixth classes, Order of the Rising Sun	For those cited for outstanding achievement
Second - sixth classes, Order of the Sacred Treasure	For long and distinguished public service
Order of Culture	For particularly significant achievements in regards to the furthering of cultural development

Criteria for the Medals of Honour
Medal with Red Ribbon	Awarded to individuals who have risked their lives to save others
Medal with Green Ribbon	Awarded to morally remarkable individuals who have made voluntarily participated in saving society
Medal with Yellow Ribbon	Awarded to individuals who have become public role models
Medal with Purple RIbbon	Awarded to individuals who have contributed to academic and artistic developments, improvements and achievements.
Medal with Blue Ribbon	Awarded to individuals who have made efforts in areas of public interest and welfare
Medal with Dark Blue Ribbon	Awarded to individuals who have made generous financial contributions for the good of the public

== Statistics ==
As of November 2024, a total of 174,842 orders have been conferred upon living Japanese nationals since 2003, when the honours system was overhauled. These include 21 awards of the Order of the Paulownia Flowers, 40,232 awards of the Order of the Rising Sun and 134,589 awards of the Order of the Sacred Treasure. (Note: The highest Japanese decoration, the Order of the Chrysanthemum, has not been conferred upon a living Japanese national who is not a member of the Imperial Family since 1997, when former Prime Minister Yasuhiro Nakasone was decorated with the Grand Cordon of the Order.) Of those decorations, the Order of the Sacred Treasure (76.98% of the total, all classes) is the most commonly conferred decoration, followed by the Order of the Rising Sun (23.01% of the total, all classes). The Order of the Paulownia Flowers is conferred the most rarely, at only 0.12% of the total number of decorations awarded since 2003.

Per class of decoration, excluding the Order of the Chrysanthemum, the breakdown of decorations awarded by level since 2003 is as follows:

- 416 awards at the level of Grand Cordon (0.24% of total)
- 2,009 at the level of Gold and Silver Star (1.15% of total)
- 13,989 at the level of Gold Rays with Neck Ribbon (8.00% of total)
- 38,509 at the level of Gold Rays with Rosette (22.03% of total)
- 67,659 at the level of Gold and Silver Rays (38.70% of total)
- 52,260 at the level of Silver Rays (29.89% of total)

Since 2003, the most commonly conferred decorations by class and level in the top five categories have been:

1. Silver Rays of the Order of the Sacred Treasure (47,035 awards; 26.90% of total)
2. Gold and Silver Rays of the Order of the Sacred Treasure (44,570 awards; 25.49% of total)
3. Gold Rays with Rosette of the Order of the Sacred Treasure (29,539 awards; 16.89% of total)
4. Gold and Silver Rays of the Order of the Rising Sun (23,089 awards; 13.21% of total)
5. Gold Rays with Neck Ribbon of the Order of the Sacred Treasure (11,850 awards; 6.78% of total)

For the year 2024, 8,093 decorations were conferred in the following numbers upon living Japanese:

- Order of the Paulownia Flowers (1 award; 0.012% of total)
  - Grand Cordon: 1
- Order of the Rising Sun (1,981 awards; 24.48% of total)
  - Grand Cordon: 10
  - Gold and Silver Star: 24
  - Gold Rays with Neck Ribbon: 123
  - Gold Rays with Rosette: 478
  - Gold and Silver Rays: 982
  - Silver Rays: 364
- Order of the Sacred Treasure (6,121 awards; 75.63% of total)
  - Grand Cordon: 3
  - Gold and Silver Star: 78
  - Gold Rays with Neck Ribbon: 577
  - Gold Rays with Rosette: 1,213
  - Gold and Silver Rays: 2,171
  - Silver Rays: 2,079

== Past system ==
=== 2003 revision ===
In the system before the 2003 revision, titles consisted of two parts, the class number (kuntō) and the decoration. For example:

- 勲一等旭日桐花大綬章 (literally: 1st Class, Grand Cordon of the Order of the Rising Sun, Paulownia Flowers)
- 勲一等旭日大綬章 (literally: 1st Class, Grand Cordon of the Order of the Rising Sun)
- 勲二等旭日重光章 (literally: 2nd Class, The Order of the Rising Sun, Gold and Silver Star)

although their official English translations did not have these class numbers. The 2003 revision removed the class part from the titles, thus:

- 桐花大綬章 (Grand Cordon of the Order of the Paulownia Flowers)
- 旭日大綬章 (Grand Cordon of the Order of the Rising Sun)
- 旭日重光章 (The Order of the Rising Sun, Gold and Silver Star)

== See also ==
- People's Honour Award - an award given by the Japanese Prime Minister
