= Heirloom Seal of the Realm =

Ancient Chinese imperial jade seal

Heirloom Seal of the Realm 傳國璽 传国玺
- Speculative inscription of the seal in bird-worm seal script, from chapter 26 of Chuogeng Lu by Tao Zongyi, Yuan dynasty.
- Armiger: Imperial China
- Adopted: 221 BC
- Motto: 受命於天 既壽永昌 (Shòumìng yú tiān jì shòu yǒngchāng, "Having received the Mandate from Heaven, may (the emperor) lead a long and prosperous life.") 受命 於天 既壽 永昌
- Use: Official seal of the state

Heirloom Seal of the Realm
- Traditional Chinese: 傳國璽
- Simplified Chinese: 传国玺
Transcriptions
Standard Mandarin
- Hanyu Pinyin: Chuán guó xǐ
- Wade–Giles: Ch'uan^{2} kuo^{2} hsi^{3}
- IPA: [ʈʂʰwǎn kwǒ ɕì]
Yue: Cantonese
- Yale Romanization: Chyùn gwok sáai
- Jyutping: Cyun4 gwok3 saai2
- IPA: [tsʰyn˩ kʷɔk̚˧ saj˧˥]
Southern Min
- Tâi-lô: thuân kok suá
Middle Chinese
- Middle Chinese: /ɖˠiuᴇn kwək̚ siᴇ^{X}/
Old Chinese
- Zhengzhang: /*don kʷɯːɡ smlelʔ/

The Heirloom Seal of the Realm (traditional Chinese: 傳國玉璽; simplified Chinese: 传国玉玺; pinyin: chuán guó yù xǐ), also known in English as the Imperial Seal of China, was a Chinese jade seal, either carved out of lantian (蓝田) jade, or, allegedly, the Heshibi, a sacred piece of jade. The Seal was created in 221 BC, shortly after Qin Shi Huang unified China and established the Qin dynasty, China's first imperial dynasty. The Heirloom Seal served as the imperial Chinese seal throughout the next millennium of Chinese history, and its possession was seen as a physical symbol of the Mandate of Heaven.

According to historical sources, the seal was about four cun in diameter and had five coiling chi-dragons carved on top, and was alternatively called "The Seal of the Son of Heaven.

The Heirloom Seal was lost around the end of the Tang dynasty (618–907) or during the Five Dynasties and Ten Kingdoms period (907–960).

== Creation ==
In 221 BC, the Seal was created when Qin Shi Huang destroyed the remaining Warring States and united China under the Qin dynasty. Heshibi was a famous piece of jade stone which previously belonged to the Zhao state. Passing into the hands of the new Emperor of China, he ordered it made into his Imperial seal. The words, "Having received the Mandate from Heaven, may (the emperor) lead a long and prosperous life." (受命於天, 既壽永昌) were written by Prime Minister Li Si in bird-worm seal script, and carved onto the seal by Sun Shou. The Seal was carved from jade because, in ancient China, jade was symbolic of the inner beauty within humans. Many tombs and burials from ancient China contained decorative jade, including a jade burial suit unearthed in 1968 that belonged to a Han prince, Liu Sheng. During the Han dynasty, the Chinese associated jade with immortality to a point where some individuals attempted to drink jade in liquid form to gain eternal life. This association further complements the idea of the Mandate of Heaven and why the Seal was carved in jade, China's most valued material for thousands of years.

== Han dynasty and Three Kingdoms period ==
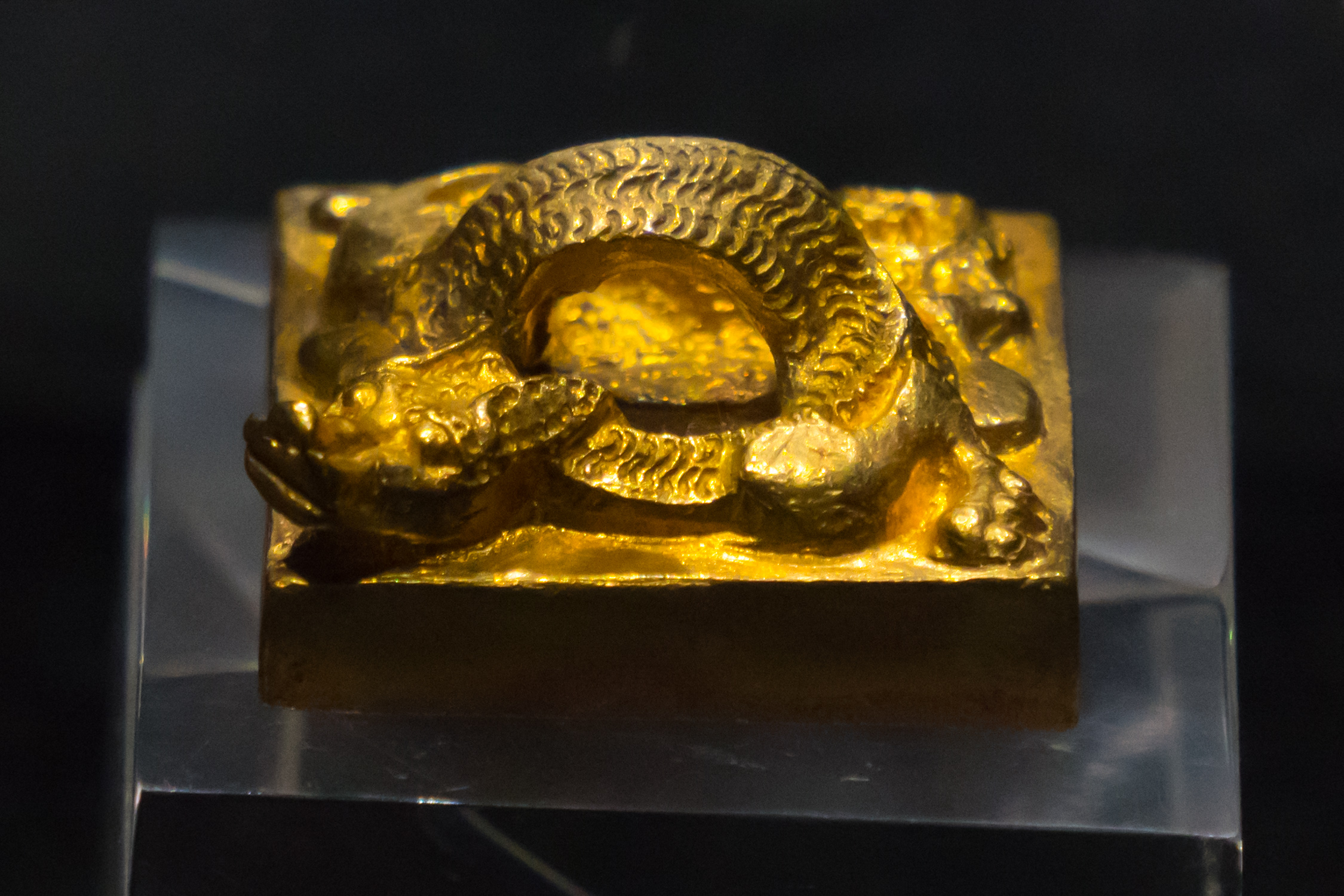
Imperial seal knob of Emperor Wen of the Nanyue Kingdom, carved into the shape of a dragon (175 BCE-124 BCE).

At the death of the second Emperor of Qin, his successor Ziying surrendered the Seal to Liu Bang, the new emperor of the Han dynasty whereafter, it was known as the "Han Heirloom Seal of the Realm". At the end of the Western Han dynasty in 9 CE, Wang Mang, the usurper, forced the Han empress dowager to surrender the Seal. The empress dowager, in an angered protest, threw the Seal on the ground, chipping one corner or horn. Later, Wang Mang ordered the corner to be restored with gold, and declared himself as the emperor of the newly established Xin dynasty. Wang Mang's regime proved to be unstable, as peasant rebellions broke out soon after and Wang Mang was killed in battle at the hands of the Red Eyebrows and Lülin rebel forces. The Seal would eventually be passed through the interregnum rulers Liu Xuan and Liu Penzi, until it finally came under the possession of Liu Xiu, later Emperor Guangwu of Han, and his imperial line. As the Seal was passed on even as dynasties rose and fell, it was became a legitimising device, signalling the Mandate of Heaven. Thus seal became the object of rivalry and armed conflict. Regimes which possessed the seal declared themselves, and are often historically regarded, as legitimate. At the end of the Han dynasty in the 3rd century AD, General Sun Jian found the Imperial Seal when his forces occupied the evacuated Han imperial capital Luoyang, in the course of the campaign against Dong Zhuo, giving it to his chief, warlord Yuan Shu. Yuan Shu then declared himself emperor under the short-lived Zhong dynasty in 197. This act angered the many warlords such as Cao Cao and Liu Bei, leading to several crushing defeats by each army. The other warlords, even after being issued with an imperial decree, refused to help Cao Cao and Liu Bei in defeating Yuan Shu. When Yuan Shu was defeated in 199 by Liu Bei, the Seal came into the hands of Cao Cao, whose son Cao Pi proclaimed the Wei dynasty as the legitimate successor state to Han in 220. The Seal remained in the hands of Wei dynasty emperors until the last emperor Cao Huan was forced to abdicate in Sima Yan's favor, passing the Seal from Cao to Sima and establishing the Jin dynasty in 265.

== Loss ==
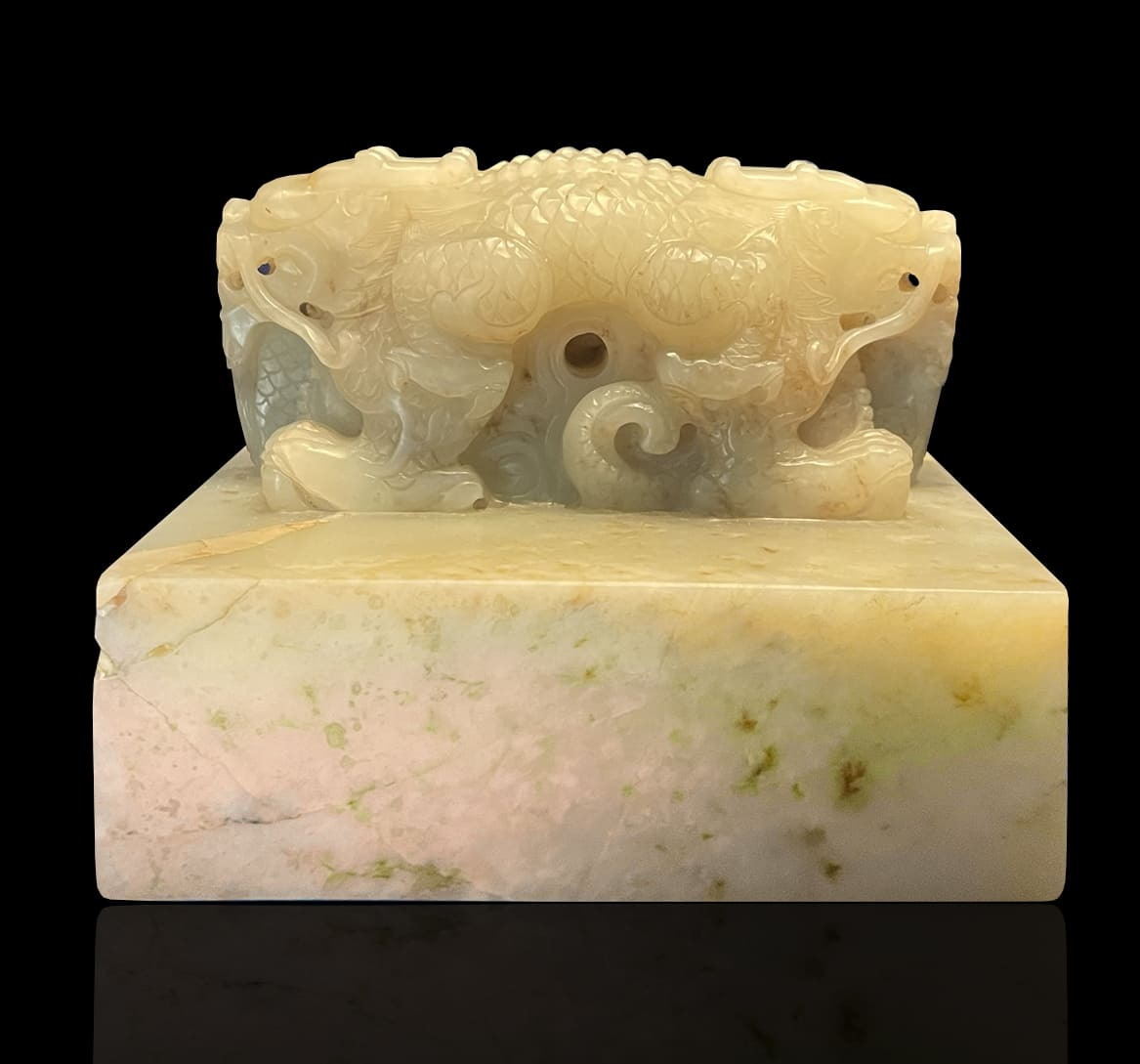
A select Jade Seal of the Qing Dynasty-era Emperor Qianlong (1745–1796).

The Seal was passed through the Cao Wei dynasty, Jin dynasty, Sixteen Kingdoms period, Southern and Northern dynasties period, Sui dynasty and Tang dynasty, but was lost in the Five Dynasties and Ten Kingdoms period (907–960).

What happened to the seal during and after the Five Dynasties and Ten Kingdoms period is not known. Three theories exist as to when, and how, it was lost:

1. In 937, at the end of the Later Tang, when its last emperor (Li Congke) died by self-immolation.
2. In 946, when the Emperor Taizong of Liao captured the last emperor of the Later Jin state.
3. The seal came into the hands of the later Yuan emperors.

"Seal of the Emperor of the Great Ming" (大朙皇帝之寶; Dà Míng huángdì zhī bǎo)

When the Ming armies captured the Yuan capital in 1369, it captured just one out of the eleven personal seals of the Yuan emperors; The Heirloom Seal was not noted to be among them. In 1370, Ming armies invaded the Northern Yuan dynasty and captured some treasures brought there by the retreating Yuan emperor. However, once more the Heirloom Seal was not noted to be among them. By the beginning of the Ming dynasty, the Seal was known to be lost. Neither the Ming nor the Qing dynasties possessed it. Reducing the significance of the lost Heirloom Seal partly explains the Qing Emperors' obsession with creating numerous imperial seals — the Forbidden City in Beijing has a collection of 25 seals solely for the emperors' official use.

"Seal of the Great Qing Empire", one of the 'modern' seals created by the Qing court in 1909–1911.

In the early 20th century, as the Qing Empire pursued reforms to modernise its system of government, a series of official seals were created for use on documents and instruments of the imperial government. Although square in shape following the traditional design, the seal dies themselves were made of wood, in imitation of Western government precedents and, contrary to earlier Qing imperial seals which were bilingual (Chinese and Manchu), had only Chinese text. Four seal dies were carved: "The Seal of the Great Qing" (大清國寶), "The Seal of the Great Qing Emperor" (大清皇帝之寶), "The Great Seal of the Great Qing Empire" (大清帝國之璽), and "The Seal of the Emperor of the Great Qing Empire" (大清帝國皇帝之寶). Of these, the Great Seal of the Great Qing Empire represented the official, modern "replacement" for the lost heirloom seal. The seal dies are in the collection of the Palace Museum in Beijing, and none show signs of use. After the fall of the Qing Empire in 1912, the Republic of China government likewise adopted a set of square-shaped official seals. The People's Republic of China initially adopted a similar square seal, but this fell out of use by 1954.

Several seals have since been claimed as the lost Heirloom Seal, but none have held up under scrutiny. In at least one case, the seal concerned was found to be a personal seal of an emperor, rather than the Heirloom Imperial Seal.

== See also ==
- Imperial Seal of Japan
- Imperial Seal of Korea
- Imperial Seal of Manchukuo
- Imperial Seal of the Mongols
- National seals of the Republic of China
- Nine Tripod Cauldrons
- Seal (East Asia)
- Seal of the People's Government of the People's Republic of China
- Seal script
