= Battle of Nghĩa Lộ (1952) =

- Part of the First Indochina War
Date	14–18 October 1952
Location	Nghĩa Lộ, Yên Bái Province, Vietnam
Result	Việt Minh victory

Belligerents
Democratic Republic of Vietnam: (North Vietnam) Việt Minh	French Union: France; French Indochina; State of Vietnam

Commanders and leaders
Võ Nguyên Giáp	Raoul Salan

Strength
~10,000	~1,000

Casualties and losses
Unknown	700

The Battle of Nghĩa Lộ was a battle of the First Indochina War. In the fall of 1952 the French army encountered its most serious crisis since the disasters near the Chinese border (Chiến dịch biên giới – Borderland Campaign) at Cao Bằng, Đông Khê and RC 4 occurred in 1949 and 1950. The Battle of Nghĩa Lộ was the opening salvo in a series of offenses and counter-offenses in late 1952 during the First Indochina War. It was part of a Việt Minh offensive in the T'ai region of Tonkin in the vicinity of the Black River (Northwest Campaign or Black River Offensive). The French countered with Operation Lorraine to attack Việt Minh rear supply bases in an attempt to cut off the offensive. The Việt Minh did not cease or divert the offensive to protect its supply bases. The Việt Minh continued its offensive attack against Nà Sản where there was an outpost and a short airstrip, both guarded by the French army. This series of battles lasted for three months between October 1952 and December 1952. These actions and the Việt Minh successes set the stage for the subsequent invasion of Laos in April 1953.

== Background ==
After the French loss of the border posts at Cao Bằng, Đông Khê and RC 4 in 1949 and 1950, a new commander in chief, Gen. Jean de Lattre de Tassigny, had been assigned to replace, General Carpentier. De Lattre's forces were able in the following year to defeat the Việt Minh defending a series of Vietnamese offenses in 1951. The French won narrow victories at Vĩnh Yên in January, Mạo Khê in March and the Battle of the Day River in May and June (where General de Lattre lost a son in battle). De Lattre was hailed as a hero.

By the late spring of 1951 General de Lattre had constructed a strong chain of defensive positions stretching from Halong Bay to Vĩnh Yên in the west and to That Diem and the sea in the south. This de Lattre Line was designed to protect the Red River Delta and the cities of Hanoi and Haiphong from "the initial shocks of a [potential] Chinese invasion" and to serve as "mooring points for offensive operations."

Furthermore, de Lattre formed all French forces not engaged in defense of the de Lattre Line into mobile groups, combined arms units roughly equivalent to the American regimental combat team. Yet the groups were mobile only in the sense that they were motorized or mechanized, for their tanks, trucks, half-tracks, and armored cars were of little use in the mountainous jungles that covered much of northern Vietnam. The mobile groups were intended as both a quick-reaction defensive and an offensive force, but through the summer of 1951 the French conducted relatively few offensive operations.

In November 1951, General de Lattre launched an offensive operation (Tulipe) against the Việt Minh in Hòa Bình to reclaim an area he saw as vital for France's future in Indochina. In the resulting Battle of Hòa Bình, General de Lattre became ill from cancer. He returned to Paris and died in February 1952. He was replaced as commander in chief by General Salan. Meanwhile, the Battle raged on and General Salan, who saw the province, conversely, as an area that was hard to support and to defend, decided to withdraw his troops (Operation Amarante). Between February 22 and 25, French troops successfully withdrew from Hòa Bình.

Meanwhile, by 1952, French supported guerrillas were operating in T'ai country near the border between China and Vietnam. Although not a serious threat to Việt Minh hegemony, these forces were tying down numerous Việt Minh troops in guarding and protecting the supply lines from China to Vietnam and the depots used by the Việt Minh such as Lào Cai.

== Battle ==
In the fall of 1952 General Giap planned an offensive into the T'ai country to try and win a psychological and political victory by defeating the French garrisons in the Phan Xi Păng Mountain Range east of the Black River. These garrisons were anchored by the outpost at Nghĩa Lộ, which had survived an attack a year earlier in October 1951. On October 11, 1952, the Việt Minh began the offensive crossing the Red River along a 65 km front with three Việt Minh regiments (the 308th, the 312th and the 316th Divisions) supported by an artillery regiment (the 148th of the 351st Heavy Division). This area was a heavily wooded region north and east of the Black River inhabited mainly by Muong mountain tribesmen. The center column (308th) of the three pronged attack targeted Nghĩa Lộ. The 312th headed for Gia Hoi (west) and the 316th headed for Van Yen (east). Meanwhile, the 148th protected the northern flank (from the pro-French guerrilla strongholds) in an arc from Than Uyen to Dien Bien Phu.

The Việt Minh attacked Nghĩa Lộ on October 17. The French fell back from its weakly defended outposts around the town toward their main fortified positions, drawing the attackers with them. Paratroopers were then to drop behind the attacking forces to trap them. However, bad weather prevented the use of paratroopers, and the Việt Minh attackers cut off the retreat of the French forces falling back on Nghĩa Lộ. On October 18 the Việt Minh overwhelmed the town's last defenses. In retrospect it appears that the Việt Minh had over 10,000 troops in this offensive and the French less than 1,000, not including the paratroopers.

Then battle continued into Tu Le and Gia-Hoi as the 6th Colonial Parachute Battalion, commanded by Major Marcel Bigeard, fought a rear guard action. The French forces were able under this screen to retreat to outposts west of the Black River – Sơn La, Nà Sản and Moc Chau. By November all of the T'ai country east and north of the Black River was under Việt Minh control. This was a clear Việt Minh success.

=== Counterattacks ===
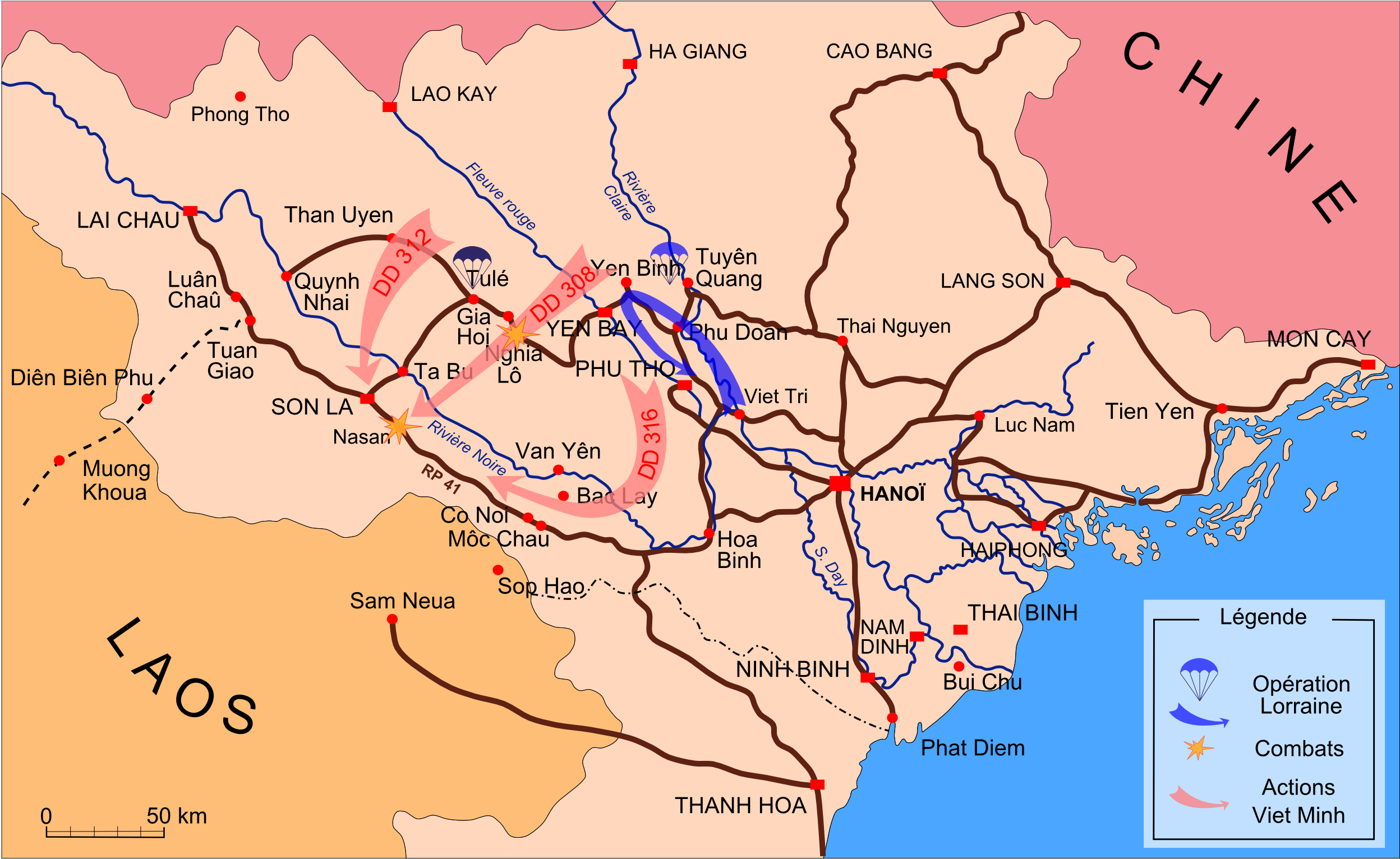
Showing Nghĩa Lộ, Gia Hoi and Tu Le and subsequent Operation Lorraine and Nà Sản

To divert the Việt Minh from the Black River, the French launched a strong offensive along the line of the Red and Clear Rivers east of The Black River. This offensive, code named Operation Lorraine, began at the end of October 1952 amid considerable fanfare and publicity. The largest operation ever attempted by the French in Vietnam, it involved over 30,000 men with large numbers of artillery, tanks, and planes. Advancing northwest, the French quickly seized the towns of Phu Doan and Phú Yên Binh, important Việt Minh supply centers where they found large stocks of weapons and ammunition. Then the attack bogged down, hampered by a long and precarious supply line. By mid-November Operation Lorraine was in reverse, with French troops and supply columns withdrawing behind the de Lattre Line under constant harassment from Việt Minh troops and irregulars.

The French could not inflict a decisive defeat on the enemy, despite a 2.5 to 1 manpower superiority in infantry and an overwhelming edge in artillery, tanks, and air support. To take advantage of their superiority, the French forces required large quantities of supplies that could be moved only by road, and the roads were particularly susceptible to Việt Minh infiltration and counterattack.

Only a few weeks later another major engagement developed west of the Black River line at Nà Sản, a strong point held by nine full-strength French battalions, supported by aircraft and five batteries of 105-mm. howitzers. Cut off from overland supply, Nà Sản was a fortified area of about fifteen square kilometers with an airstrip on the floor of a valley. The French fortified the surrounding high ground and ran supplies to the beleaguered fortress by air. The Việt Minh attacked Nà Sản with two regiments. The major fighting occurred between November 23 and 30. The Việt Minh attacked tenaciously, but the French defenses held.

Although the French could count Nà Sản as a victory, the intense fighting there and in T'ai during the autumn of 1952 severely taxed French resources, particularly those of the Air Force. Under pressure of battle, its maintenance facilities, never very efficient, had collapsed completely. At one airfield, for example, the Military Assistance Advisory Group observers discovered only two men assigned to overhaul 20-mm. cannon, and they could handle only ten cannon a month, less than one-sixth the total requiring maintenance.

Meanwhile, to the south at Van Yen the 316th occupied that village and continued to Ba Lai which the French had been using to block Việt Minh access to the black River delta. To the north the 148th Regiment struck and overran the small French garrison at Dien Bien Phu. The Việt Minh had taken nearly 290 km of territory within 90 days reaching the Laotian border.

== Aftermath ==
The Việt Minh offensives of 1952 led France to new requests for additional American assistance. In addition to materiel, in December the French government formally asked that U.S. Air Force personnel (mechanics) be sent to Vietnam for a month to perform routine maintenance checks on French C-47 aircraft.

What Nghĩa Lộ and the subsequent battles also made clear (in hindsight) was:

1. The French army lacked the numerical strength to mount an all-out offensive. Normally the number of French battalions would be compared to the estimated number of Việt Minh regular and regional units, and produce a simple comparison which seemed to suggest that the French with their greater mobility enjoyed a substantial advantage. Yet such calculation took no account of Việt Minh guerrillas and of the fact that the strength of the regular and regional Việt Minh forces was almost certainly underestimated. Nor did this accounting consider the special nature of the war being waged by them. Although both sides had about ninety maneuver battalions, the Việt Minh had no posts or communication lines to guard. The French employed nearly 70% of their strength to protect their rear areas, leaving only about twenty-five battalions for mobile operations.
2. The assessment that the French supply and transport system as superior to that of the Việt Minh was problematic. The road-bound French supply convoys, with hundreds of trucks constantly exposed to ambush, were far more vulnerable and less flexible than the primitive Việt Minh supply services. The Việt Minh knew the terrain and had large numbers of laborers and porters who could operate along concealed routes. Despite their trucks, tanks, planes, and helicopters, the French were less mobile in a practical military sense than were the Việt Minh, who could shift entire divisions across vast areas unimpeded and often undetected by the French.

The offensive provided a great deal of momentum to enable the Việt Minh to invade Laos in April, 1953 along with its Pathet Lao allies.
