= Operation Mouette =

- Part of the First Indochina War
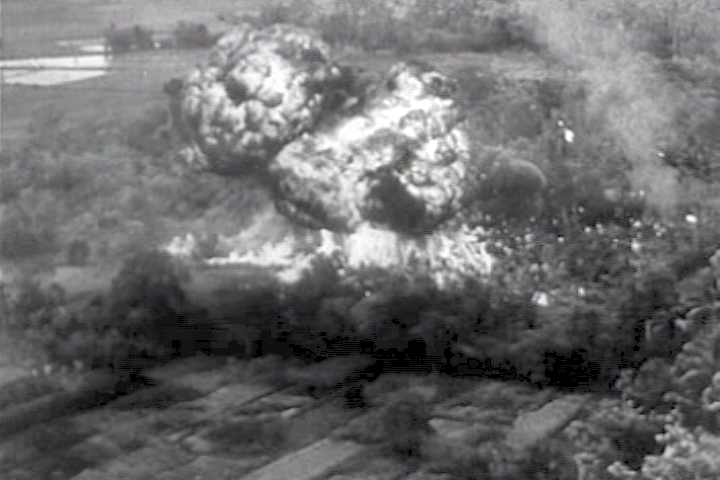
- A Bearcat of the Aéronavale drops napalm on Việt Minh Division 320th's artillery during the operation.
Date	October 15, 1953 – November 7, 1953.
Location	Vietnam, French Indochina
Result	French Union victory: Area temporarily occupied before French withdrawal.

Belligerents
French Union: France; French Indochina; State of Vietnam	Democratic Republic of Vietnam: (North Vietnam) Việt Minh

Commanders and leaders
(France) Christian de Castries (France) Jean Gilles	(North Vietnam) Văn Tiến Dũng

Strength
(France) 21,000–24,500 supported by Chaffee tanks	(North Vietnam) 320th Division (Vietnam) + regional forces

Casualties and losses
France: 113 killed 505 wounded 151 missing State of Vietnam: unknown	1,000 killed 2,500 wounded 182 captured (French estimates).

Operation Mouette was an operation in 1953 by the armies of the French Union (France and State of Vietnam) in Northern Vietnam during the First Indochina War. It was launched on October 15 in an attempt to locate and destroy communist Việt Minh major troops operating under the command of Võ Nguyên Giáp around the area of Phu Nho Quan, south of the Red River Delta. Following the establishment of a French camp in the area, various troops were dispatched to engage the Viet-Minh forces. The operation was ended and the French Union withdrew by November 7, claiming approximately 1,000 enemy combatants killed, twice as many wounded, and 181 captured as well as a substantial quantity of weapons and ammunition.

== Background ==
=== The war ===
The First Indochina War had raged, as guerrilla warfare, since 19 December 1946. From 1949, it evolved into conventional warfare, due largely to aid from the People's Republic of China ("PRC") to the north. Subsequently, the French strategy of occupying small, poorly defended outposts throughout Indochina, particularly along the Vietnamese-Chinese border, was failing. Thanks to the terrain and the close border with China, the Viet Minh had succeeded in turning a "clandestine guerrilla movement into a powerful conventional army", something which previously had never been encountered by the western world. In October 1952, fighting around the Red River Delta spread into the Thai Highlands, resulting in the battle of Nà Sản, at which the Viet-Minh were defeated. The French used the lessons learned at Nà Sản – strong ground bases, versatile air support, and a model based on the British Burma campaign – as the basis for their new strategy. The Viet-Minh, however, remained unbeatable in the highland regions of Vietnam, and the French "could not offset the fundamental disadvantages of a road bound army facing a hill and forest army in a country which had few roads but a great many hills and forests". In May 1953, General Henri Navarre arrived to take command of the French forces in May 1953, replacing General Raoul Salan. Navarre spoke of a new offensive spirit in Indochina – based on strong, fast-moving forces.

=== Delta and Dien Bien Phu ===
During August 1953, Navarre was aware of four divisions of the People's Army operating in the Red River Delta. This was during a time when Navarre was organising the disposition of forces for the occupation of Dien Bien Phu, and thus his opponents' operations in the Delta persuaded him into committing forces there. Navarre committed his thoughts to paper on September 19 in a general instruction relegating the threat to Laos as "provisionally reduced" relative to the Delta, and thus chose to commit forces to that end over Dien Bien Phu. Division 320 of the People's Army, operating in the Phu Nho Quam forests, 12 miles from the De Lattre Line, was targeted by Operation Mouette.

== Operation ==
Mouette is the French term for seagull, deriving from the Norse Mavri or Old English Maew. The operation, launched on October 15, was described by Martin Windrow as "not a raid, but an attempt to fix and destroy a major element of the Chu Luc before Giap could deploy it." The route for the Viet-Minh between Thanh Hóa and the Delta contained a crossroads at Lai Cac which was targeted by the operation. Seven Mobile Groups (Groupes Mobiles) were deployed with river and amphibious units; tank units (largely the M24 Chaffee); half-tracks and paratroopers at designated landing sites, after counter-intelligence misled the Viet-Minh into defending the wrong locations. GM 2 and GM 3 took Lai Cac and established a camp under Colonel Christian de Castries, who would go on to command at Dien Bien Phu, and General Jean Gilles who would command Dien Bien Phu's initial paratrooper occupation.

After occupation, the night of October 18 saw heavy counterattacks, which the French resisted. A battalion of the 13th Foreign Legion Demi-Brigade under Major Paul Pégot held out all night against one enemy battalion, and was "regarded as a particularly solid unit." followed by two weeks of probing by GM 4 and paratrooper units. These columns fought major engagements in the surrounded countryside against Division 320, particularly on November 2, which continued until French withdrawal overnight on November 6. The French claimed over 1,000 enemy killed and 2,500 wounded, while 182 were captured, along with "500 infantry weapons, plus 100 bazookas and recoilless guns and 3,000 mines." Windrow notes that this would amount to one third of Division 320, and Wiest writes that the operation "weakened the VM 320th Division." French casualties amounted to 113 dead, including seven officers, and 505 wounded men, including 22 officers. 151 were also recorded as missing.

== Aftermath ==
Navarre, despite the success of the operation, noted – according to Windrow – the "inefficiency of the bulk of the Expeditionary Corps' infantry by late 1953" and would state in front of the Dien Bien Phu committee of inquiry that "Mouette demonstrated – in the opinion of Generals Cogny, Gilles and myself – that if we sent out infantry, given its present quality, outside the radius within which it enjoyed artillery support, then if it encountered Viet-Minh infantry, it would be beaten." Jane Errington and B. McKercher, in their The Vietnam War as History, noted Mouette to be a "modest operation".

A number of the French units involved in Mouette would go on to serve at Dien Bien Phu, particularly the 1st Parachute Chasseur Regiment and the 13th Foreign Legion Demi-Brigade. Both de Castries and Gilles would also serve there, the former commanding the troops on the ground following the initial occupation by paratroopers under the latter. Viet-Minh Division 320 did not serve at Dien Bien Phu, and instead continued to operate in the Delta, occupying the attention of General Cogny – who command the French troops there – and continually tying down French forces there which could otherwise have served at Dien Bien Phu.

== Gallery ==
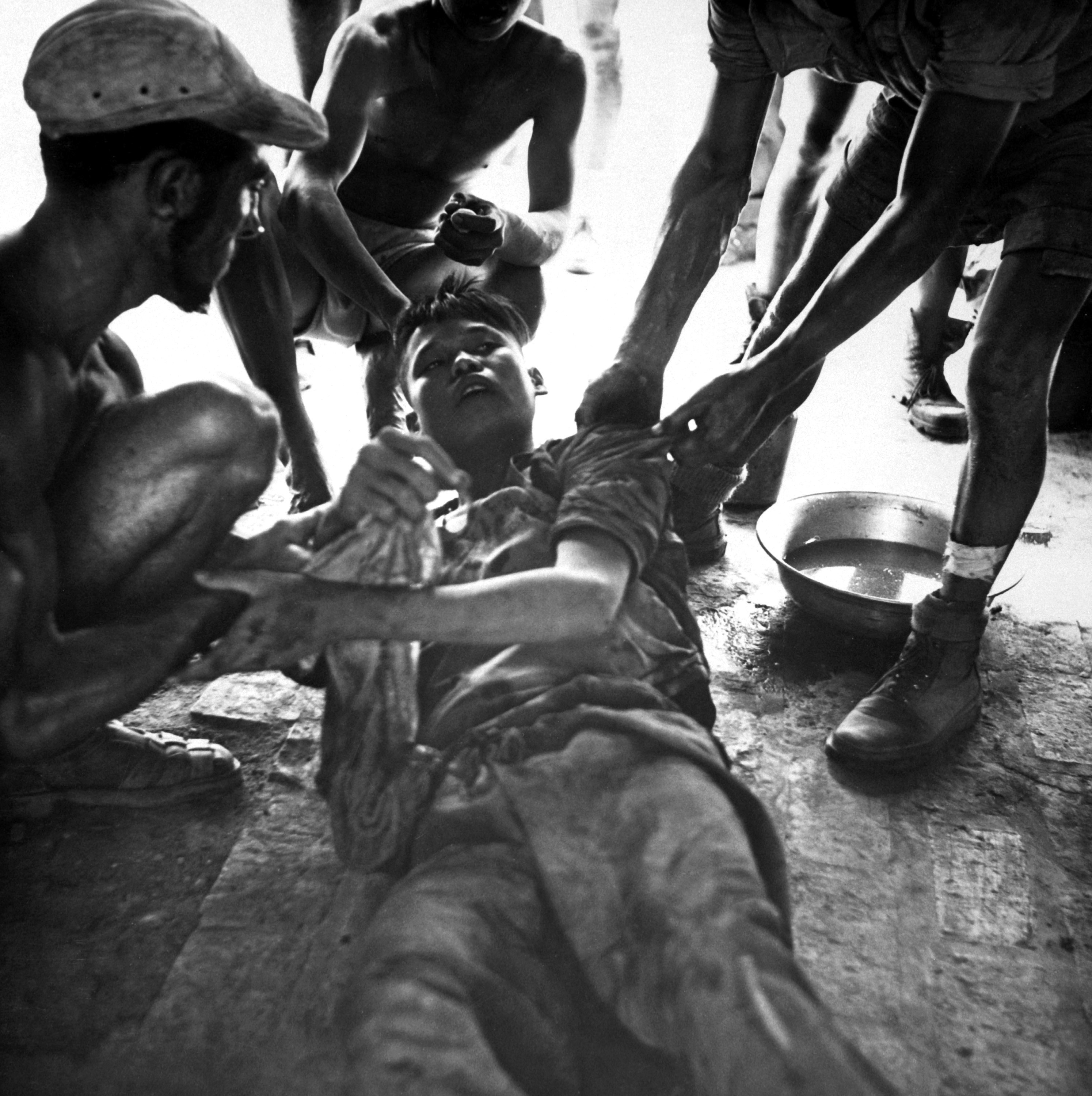
French and Vietnamese forces cooperated during the Operation, treating injured Viet-Minh prisoners as shown here.

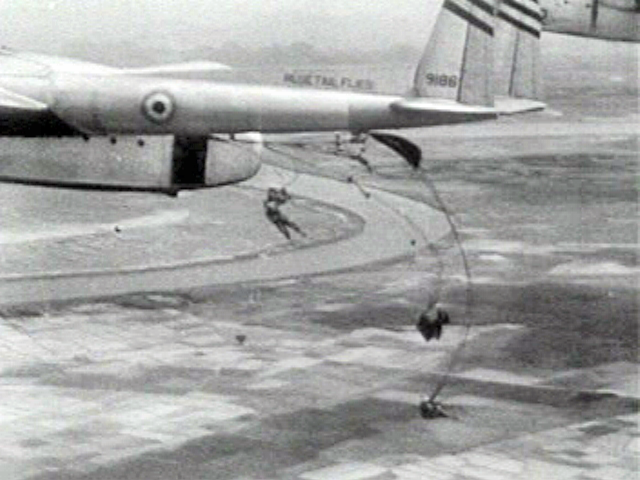
French Union paratroopers dropping from a "Flying Boxcar".

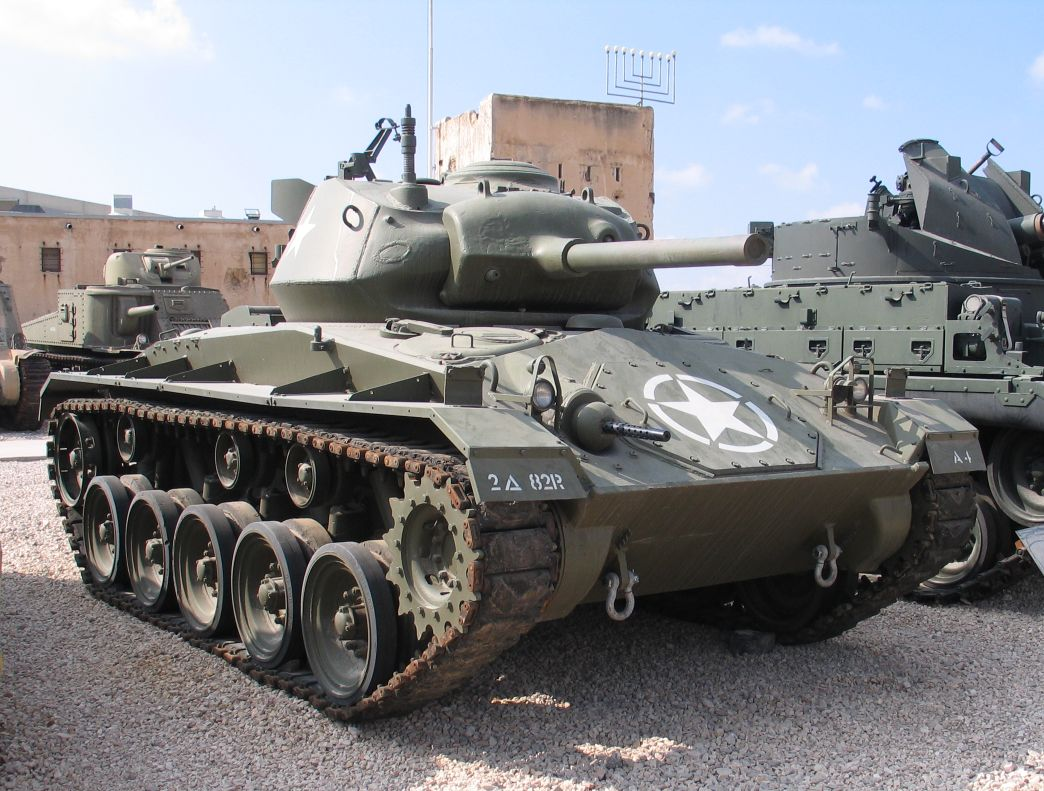
M24 Chaffee light tanks, such as the American one shown here, fought during the operation.
