= Battle of Muong Khoua =

Battle of the First Indochina War

- Part of the First Indochina War
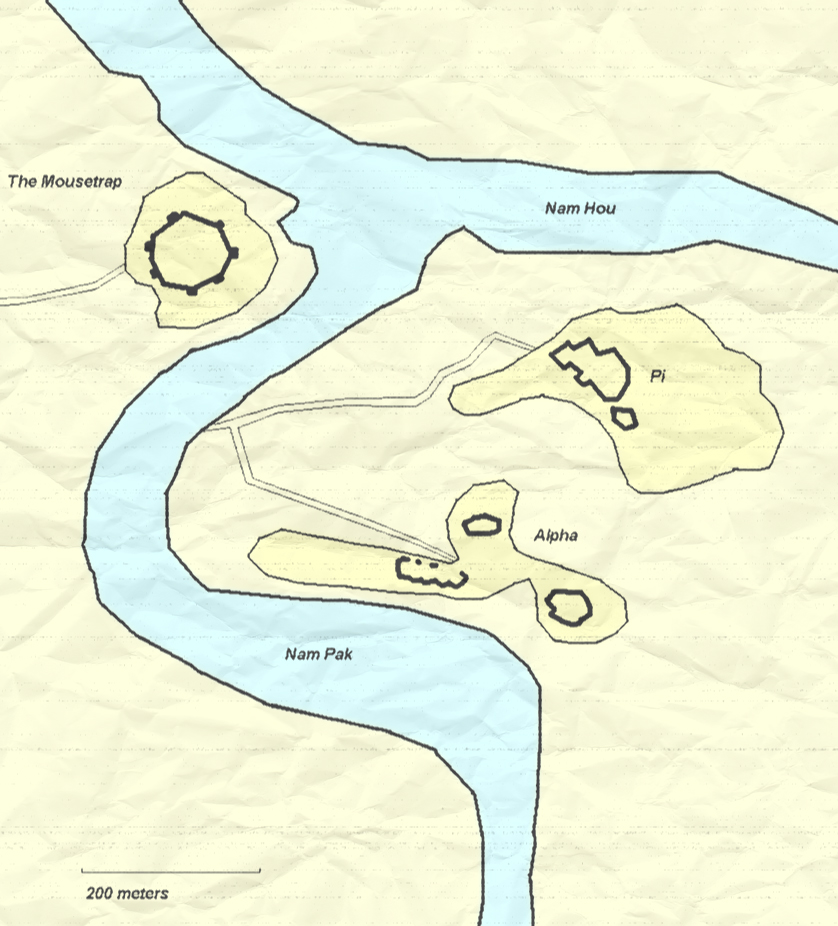
- The three French positions at Muong Khoua. Alpha fell first, followed by the Mousetrap, while Pi held until midday.
Date	April 13 – May 18, 1953
Location	21°04′39″N 102°30′18″E; Muong Khoua, Kingdom of Laos (Phongsaly Province, Laos)
Result	Việt Minh victory

Belligerents
Democratic Republic of Vietnam: (North Vietnam) Việt Minh	French Union: France; French Indochina; Kingdom of Laos

Commanders and leaders
Unknown	Captain Teullier

Strength
Unknown	315

Casualties and losses
One battalion and supporting mortar detachment.	~310, four known survivors.
- Sources give the strength of the French force as 300 Laotians, and a "dozen" French. Four are known to have made it to a second French outpost.

The Battle of Muong Khoua took place between April 13 and May 18, 1953, in northern Laos during the First Upper Laos Campaign in the French Indochina War. A garrison of a dozen French and 300 Laotian troops occupied a fortified outpost in the hills above the village of Muong Khoua, across the Vietnamese border from Điện Biên Phủ. Muong Khoua was among the last French outposts in northern Laos following the decision of the French High Command to string isolated garrisons through the region in order to buy time to fortify the major Laotian cities against Việt Minh attack.

Many of these garrisons were given orders by radio to dig in and resist the approaching Việt Minh forces. Following the fall of a satellite strong point at Sop-Nao, the troops at Muong Khoua under Captain Teullier fought off a Việt Minh siege force for thirty-six days while supported by air-dropped supplies and air strikes. The small defending force repelled several direct attacks and endured a series of artillery bombardments. Two of the outpost's three strong points eventually fell in the early morning of May 18, and by midday the French force was defeated.

Four soldiers—two French and two Laotian—reached another French position 50 miles (80 km) away after six days of travel through the jungle; however, no one else escaped. The resistance of the French garrison became a popular rallying cry for French troops in Indochina as well serving as a precursor to French and Việt Minh strategies at the decisive Battle of Điện Biên Phủ the following year.

== Prelude ==
=== Việt Minh in Laos ===
In early 1953, the Việt Minh under Võ Nguyên Giáp commenced an invasion of Laos to exert additional pressure on Paris and on the French forces stationed in Indochina. In the area of Muong Khoua were the Việt Minh 308th, 312th and 316th divisions, whose long supply lines were maintained by a veritable army of 200,000 porters. The French command—headed then by Raoul Salan—ordered the establishment of a series of French outposts in northern Laos to resist the Việt Minh invading forces for as long as possible to buy time for the fortification of Luang Prabang and Vientiane, the capital cities of Laos. The King of Laos, Sisavang Vong, remained in Luang Prabang, which added greater impetus to French efforts. The terrain of northern Laos, and the local climate, isolated many of the outposts with a night-time fog known as crachin, thick jungle, a lack of roads, and steep terrain. Each outpost was given a certain number of days to withstand Việt Minh forces, including Muong Khoua which was issued orders on April 13 to hold for fourteen days—until April 27.

Muong Khoua, together with its satellite outpost Sop-Nao, was under the command of Captain Teullier, with the satellite outpost being overseen by Lieutenant Grézy. Muong Khoua was situated at the confluence of the rivers Nam Pak and Nam Hou, 40 miles (64 km) from Điện Biên Phủ, and approximately 100 miles (160 km) to the south-west of the Black River in Vietnam. The outpost itself consisted of three separate strongholds, referred to as the Mousetrap, Pi and Alpha, situated on three hills to the west, south-south-east, and south-south-west of the confluence of the Nam Hou and Nam Pak. Each was roughly 220 yards (200 m) from the other, forming a triangle. The village of Muong Khoua itself lay at the western foot of the Mousetrap, protected from the river by a large sandbank, and straddling the road to Phong Saly, another French outpost 50 miles (80 km) to the north.

=== Sop-Nao ===
Sop-Nao lay 30 miles (48 km) to the east of Muong Khoua, along the path of the Việt Minh advance, roughly 20 miles (32 km) south-west of Điện Biên Phủ and only a few miles from the Vietnam-Laos border, 75 miles (121 km) south of the T'ai Highlands. Grézy, in command of the Sop-Nao garrison, led a reinforced platoon. On the evening of April 3, a Việt Minh battalion entered Laos near Điện Biên Phủ and Nà Sản and reached Sap-Nao.

Finding themselves surrounded by the Việt Minh, the French at Sop-Nao stood for six days while in radio contact with Teullier at the main strong point. The survivors, following authorisation from the French captain, retreated during the night of April 9/10 along a round-about route following the assumption by Grézy that the Việt Minh had laid ambushes along the most direct path. The French hacked a new path through the jungle until they reached Laotian tribesmen on April 11, who warned them of Việt Minh units following them. The French attempted to turn for Phong-Saly to the north and met an allied convoy travelling down the Nam Hou in canoes. The two forces combined and sailed down the river towards Muong Khoua.

On April 12, the convoy ran into a Việt Minh ambush 600 yards (550 m) from the Muong Khoua strong point. Using a barrier of floating tree trunks, the Việt Minh attacked the convoy with machine guns and mortars, destroying the first canoe. The remaining French and Laotian troops returned fire and, with the assistance of forces from Muong Khoua who had heard the firing, routed the Việt Minh troops, who left behind 13 dead and four wounded. The French themselves suffered seven missing, one dead, and one wounded. The remainder joined the French at Muong Khoua, with the canoes and the convoy's equipment incorporated into the defence. Meanwhile, the Việt Minh's 910th Battalion of the 148th Regional Regiment of the 312th Division and a heavy mortar company from the 316th Division drew near.

== Battle ==
=== Siege ===
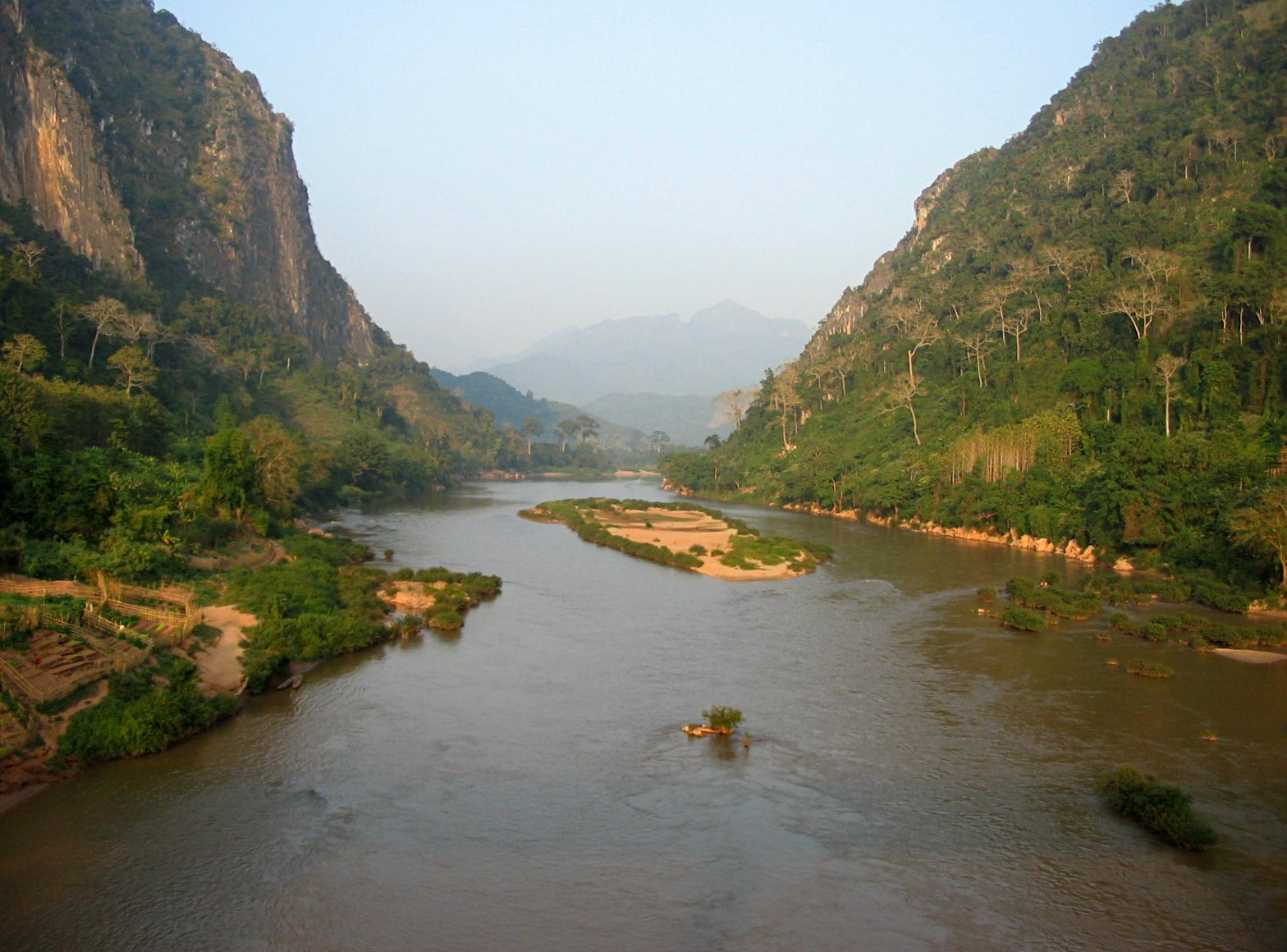
The Nam Ou River in northern Laos

While the French troops from Sop-Nao were making their way via canoe to the mother strong point, Teullier and his forces were feeling what one chronicler referred to as l'asphyxie par le vide ("choking-off by creating a void"), the result of a Việt Minh presence in the area. The local villagers no longer spoke to the French, when they had previously been communicative, and the population began leaving; both the farms and the markets were deserted. The French viewed this as an indicator of an imminent enemy attack. Furthermore, the thick jungle and steep slopes isolated the French strong points from all but river and airborne supply. The Việt Minh, on the other hand, were adequately supplied by over 200,000 porters, or coolies. Referred to officially as a "relatively small" force, the 300 Chasseurs Laotiens and "handful" of French NCOs and two officers were equipped with three 81-mm and two 60-mm mortars and two machine guns. They were ordered on April 13 to hold for fourteen days by Colonel Boucher de Crévecoeur, who promised air support.

At 23:00 hours that evening, April 13, mortar shells began landing on the slopes of position Alpha. These bombardments would take place every night, and the Việt Minh launched their first direct assault, which failed and left Việt Minh 22 dead. This defeat prompted a reversion to previous tactics of slowly "gnawing away" at the French outpost, and Giap ordered the 312th to leave some forces behind to continue a siege while the remainder of the division moved on. Meanwhile, overhead, French B-26s bombed Việt Minh positions, and cargo planes dropped supplies, Luciole (firefly) flares, and ammunition on the French positions. This "air bridge" enabled the garrison to survive, and fourteen days later on April 27 it was still intact; the French High Command dropped a Legion of Honor for Teullier and several Croix de Guerres for his men. Teullier and a small group left the Mousetrap to deliver the relevant decorations to Pi and Alpha, although movement between the positions was extremely difficult.

What was possible, however, was a small patrol through the village of Muong Khoua, which had been by now deserted. These French patrols served as an early warning system and an ambush for Việt Minh assaults during the crachin-dominated night. This pattern continued into May. Meanwhile, other French forces had liberated Xieng Khouang and reached a position 40 miles (64 km) from Muong Khoua. On May 17, the French patrol deployed to the Muong Khoua village overheard barking dogs—one of which yelped—alerting the French to an impending Việt Minh attack. By 23:00, the Việt Minh were visible in the fog, and the patrol returned to the Mousetrap. Teullier issued an alert via radio.

A bombardment from Soviet Russian 120-mm mortars, 57-mm recoilless rifles, and phosphorus grenades began at 00:30 on May 18. Teullier instructed his radio operator, Sergeant René Novak, to request air-dropped flares and air support, while mortar fire landed on Alpha and the Mousetrap, but not Pi, where Grézy was in command. Pi continued to support the other two areas of the outpost with its own mortar fire.

By 01:10 hours, the western flank of the Mousetrap had fallen to Việt Minh bombardment. By 01:30, the garrison was informed that weather conditions prevented air support, and by 02:30 the Việt Minh forces launched successive assault waves which overran Teullier and his men, including attacks which flanked the position using the nearby sandbanks. At the same time, Alpha was overrun by Việt Minh forces, and by 03:50 no more firing was heard from the Mousetrap. Alpha survived the remainder of the night and was seen fighting by French aircraft at 09:00 that morning. C-47 transport aircraft returned to resume supply drops, however by 12:00 the Tricolor and the Laotian flag had been removed from Pi's command bunker.

=== Survivors ===
"Like Christ off the Cross" was an expression which became current in Indochina to describe survivors from those harrowing retreats through the jungle. And usually that is exactly what they looked like: worn down to skeletons from hunger and dysentery, sunken eyes, the typical tropical pallor ... their emaciated faces curtained by shaggy beards, and their skins covered with festering sores, from heat rash to leech bites and jungle rot.

— Bernard Fall recounts the appearance of soldiers having endured a retreat through the jungle, such as those who survived Muong Khoua.

On May 22, four days after the fall of the Muong Khoua garrison, three of its soldiers—the garrison radio operator Novak and two Laotians—reached the only remaining French outpost in northern Laos, Phong Saly. Bernard Fall recorded in Street Without Joy: "he was only twenty-five years old, but he looked fifty; he kept on walking like an automaton to the centre of the post before he was stopped by some of the men staring at him as at a ghost." Novak and the two other soldiers had spent the four days moving through the jungle of Laos following the defeat of their unit. Two days later, Sergeant Pierre Blondeau also arrived at the outpost. His account detailed 57 hours spent hiding from the Việt Minh before a three-day march without food or navigational aids and then encountering native tribesmen who provided food and a pony, with which he reached the French forces.

== Aftermath ==
The Vietnamese and French media had awarded considerable attention to the conflict, and newspapers worldwide had covered the battle. Bernard Fall made note of the significance of the battle as "epic" in both his 1961 Street Without Joy and 1967 Hell in a Very Small Place. The British newspaper The Times began covering the conflict on April 23, reporting the retreat from Sop Nao to Muong Khoua. However, despite correctly identifying half of the Việt Minh attacking force, it rated the garrison at the mother strong point as numbering 1,000. The battle received scant attention before the garrison fell, however after that garrison was defeated the coverage remained positive at the thought of French survivors and speculative on the future of the French military presence and new commander, Henri Navarre. The French High Command released an assessment of the defeat at Muong Khoua in Communique No. 14, stating "During the night of May 17 to 18, the post of Muong Khoua, which had victoriously resisted since the beginning of the Việt Minh offensive, succumbed under the overwhelming mass of assailants."

In January 1954, Muong Khoua was re-occupied by Laotian forces, which were subsequently overrun once more by the 316th Division of the Việt Minh. The Laotian commander, who lived in the village itself with his wife, was killed in his home before the attack. Battalions of the French Foreign Legion and Laotian forces suffered losses covering the retreat of garrison survivors. The area of Muong Khoua later became a critical supply route across Dien Bien Phu for the Việt Minh and by 1963 was the site of a construction project for the proposed Route 19.

The French would use the lessons learned at Muong Khoua and those of the 1952 Battle of Nà Sản in their defence plans at Điện Biên Phủ, while the Việt Minh in turn would employ similar tactics of encirclement and strangulation there. The importance of an air bridge to maintain supply lines, strong artillery support to stave off human-wave Việt Minh attacks, and the need for isolated emplacements to mutually support each other, were also important tactics taken on board by the French from both conflicts. The disappearance of local civilian populations previously friendly towards the French, which served as a precursor to Việt Minh attack, was also remembered by the Điện Biên Phủ troops. For the Việt Minh, their abilities to isolate and smother individual strongpoints while maintaining hidden artillery and support weapon emplacements out of the reach of French airstrikes and artillery were honed at both battles, as were their practices of using human-wave attacks.
