= Dinassaut =

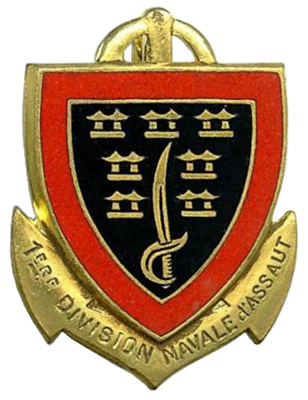
Insignia of the 1st Dinassaut

The Dinassaut (French: [dinaso], Division Navale d'Assaut, "Naval Assault Division") was a type of riverine military unit employed by the French Navy during the first Indochina War. It's an example of Riverine artillery.

The 'Dinassaut' were created by General Leclerc in 1947 in order to replace the flottilles fluviales created by Jaubert in 1945–1946. Ten groups were created.

== Organization ==
Each Dinassaut consisted of approximately 12 craft, often American landing craft modified with armour and using tank turrets as weapons. Other craft carried 81mm mortars to be employed as riverine artillery.

The ships were converted LCVP && Armored Troop Carrier (LCM):

- Landing Craft Infantry (LCI);
- Landing Craft Tank (LCT);
- Landing Craft Mechanized (LCM);
- Landing Craft Vehicle & Personnel (LCVP);
- Landing Craft Support (LCS);
- Landing Craft Assault (LCA);
- Landing Ship Supply Large (LSSL) for fire power

The ten naval assault divisions were located in the Mekong Delta (Cochinchina) and the Red River Delta (Tonkin) as follows:

- Dinassaut 2, 4, 6, 8 and 10, in Cochinchine;
- Dinassaut 1, 3, 5, 12 and Haiphong Dinassaut in Tonkin.

Each one has a company of Commandos Marine (created off Fusiliers Marins) attached to it.

== Operations ==
They were notably involved in:

- Operation Léa
- Operation Ceinture
- Battle of the Day River
- Operation Lorraine
- Operation Brochet
- Operation Mouette

== Notable people who served in Dinassaut ==
The following people have served there:

- fr:François Gabriel Pierre Jaubert who created the initial unit and whose name was given one French Special Unit, the Commando Jaubert
- Pierre Guillaume (French Navy officer) (which was the source for Le Crabe-tambour movie)
- fr:Maurice-Raymond de Brossard, a French naval officer, historian and painter.
- fr:Jean-Louis Delayen, a French general
- fr:Philippe Ausseur, a French naval officer who served in the General Staff of General de Gaulle, then as Major General of the Navy, then vice-admiral of the wing, member of the Superior Council of the Navy.

== Second Indochina War ==
Dinassaut 6 & 8 had been transferred to the Republic of Vietnam Navy (VNN) in 1953.

The concept was reused by the US Navy during the Vietnam War. This leads to the creation of the Mekong Delta Mobile Afloat Force later named Mobile Riverine Force (MRF) after May 1967.

== See also ==
- Mobile Riverine Force
- Brown-water navy
