= Saint-Germier =

Saint-Germier is the name of several communes in France:

- Saint-Germier, Haute-Garonne in the Haute-Garonne department
- Saint-Germier, Gers, in the Gers department
- Saint-Germier, Deux-Sèvres, in the Deux-Sèvres department
- Saint-Germier, Tarn, in the Tarn department
