= Jean Gilles =

Jean Gilles may refer to:

- Jean Gilles (composer) (1668–1705), French composer
- Jean Gilles (French Army officer) (1904–1961), French Army general

== See also ==
- Jean Villard (1895–1982), French Swiss chansonnier, comedian and actor, adopted the name Gilles as part of a performing duo "Gilles et Julien" with A.-M. Julien
