= Saint-Salvy-de-la-Balme =

- Commune
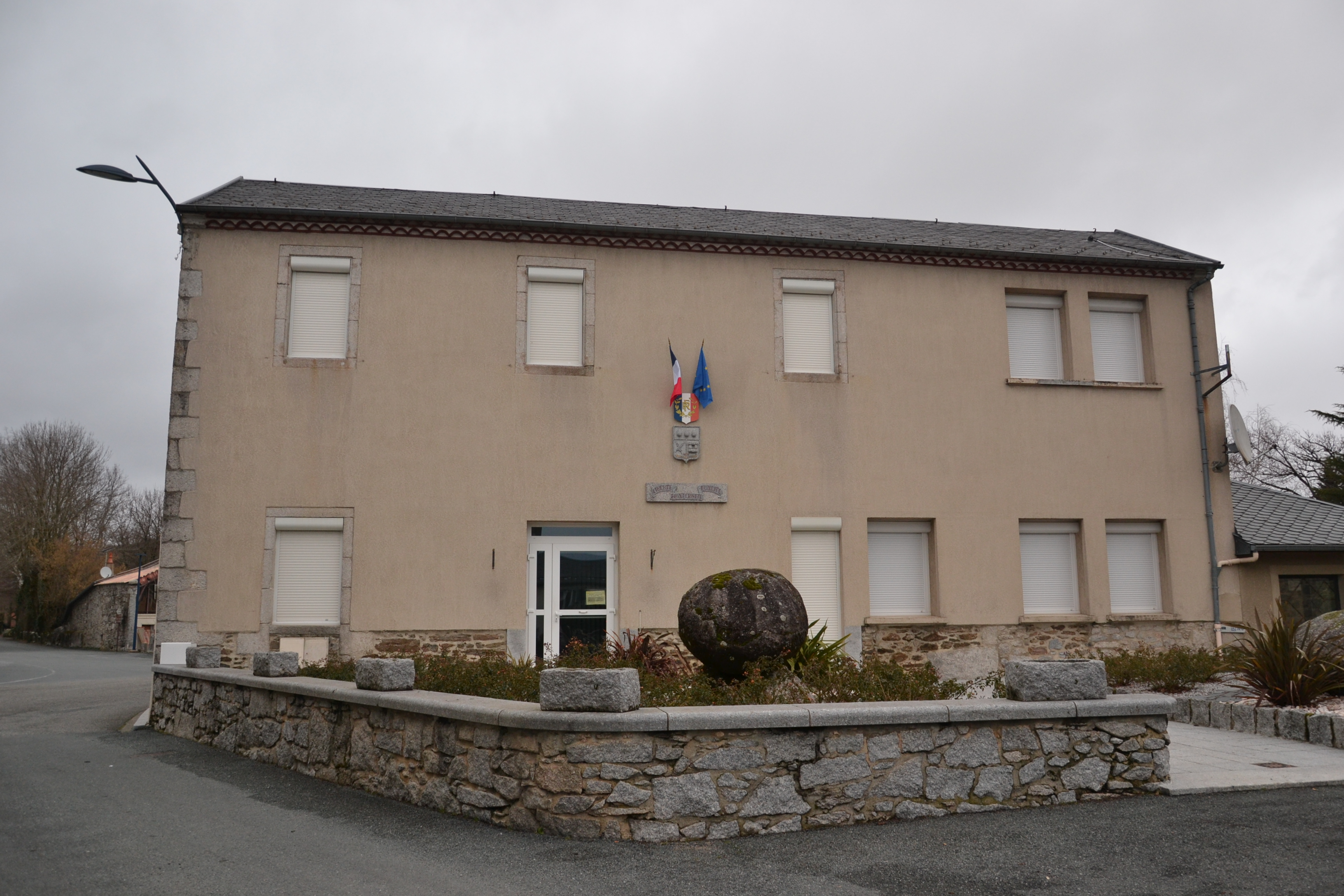
- Town hall

- Coat of arms
- Location of Saint-Salvy-de-la-Balme
- Location within France Location within Occitanie
- Coordinates: 43°36′44″N 2°23′57″E
- Country: France
- Region: Occitania
- Department: Tarn
- Arrondissement: Castres
- Canton: Castres-2

Government
  - Mayor (2020–2026): Francis Galindo
- Area^{1}: 18.36 km^{2} (7.09 sq mi)
- Highest elevation: 704 m (2,310 ft)
- Lowest elevation: 305 m (1,001 ft)
- Population (2023): 538
  - Density: 29.3/km^{2} (75.9/sq mi)
- Time zone: UTC+01:00 (CET)
  - Summer (DST): UTC+02:00 (CEST)
- INSEE/Postal code: 81269 /81490
- ^{1} French Land Register data, which excludes lakes, ponds, glaciers > 1 km^{2} (0.386 sq mi or 247 acres) and river estuaries.

Saint-Salvy-de-la-Balme (French pronunciation: [sɛ̃ salvi də la balm]; Occitan: Sant Salvi dels Ròcs) is a commune in the Tarn department in southern France.

== See also ==
- Communes of the Tarn department
