= Upper Laos campaign =

Campaign of the First Indochina War

First Upper Laos Campaign
- Part of the First Indochina War
Date	12 April – 18 May 1953
Location	Provinces of Phongsaly, Sam Neua, Xieng Khouang and Luang Prabang (Kingdom of Laos)
Result	Viet Minh victory: Việt Minh occupied parts of northern Laos; Pathet Lao resistance government established under Viet Minh direction
Territorial changes	Pathet Lao occupied Houaphanh, Xiangkhouang and parts of Phongsaly

Belligerents
Democratic Republic of Vietnam: (North Vietnam) Việt Minh; Pathet Lao	French Union: France; French Indochina; Kingdom of Laos; Hmong militias Intelligence supported: State of Vietnam

Commanders and leaders
Võ Nguyên Giáp; Hoàng Văn Thái; Nguyễn Chí Thanh; Souphanouvong; Kaysone Phomvihane; Phoumi Vongvichit; Singkapo Sikhot; Ma Khaykhamphithoune	Raoul Salan; Roger Trinquier; Ouane Rattikone; Lý Phụng

The Upper Laos campaign (Vietnamese: Chiến dịch Thượng Lào) was a military campaign of the People's Army of Vietnam military campaign aimed at spreading Vietnamese communist influence to Laos in support of the Pathet Lao. While their advance on Luang Prabang ultimately failed, they managed to occupy parts of Phongsaly (see Battle of Muong Khoua), Sam Neua, Xieng Khouang and Luang Prabang Provinces. Furthermore, Souphanouvong established his Laotian Resistance Government in Sam Neua.

== See also ==
- Lower Laos and Northeast Cambodia campaign

== Sources ==
- Dommen, Arthur J. (2002). The Indochinese Experience of the French and the Americans: Nationalism and Communism in Cambodia, Laos, and Vietnam. Indiana University Press. ISBN 9780253109255.
