= Riverine artillery =

Riverine artillery refers to artillery employment on a river, generally on floating barges. Transport of field artillery is difficult through the moist ground and riparian forest adjacent to low-gradient rivers. Traditional naval artillery is mounted on deep-draft vessels unsuited for operations in shallow rivers.

== Vietnam War ==
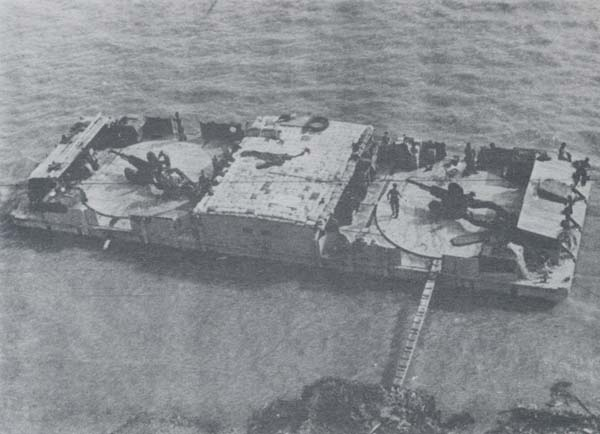
A US riverine battery in the Vietnam War

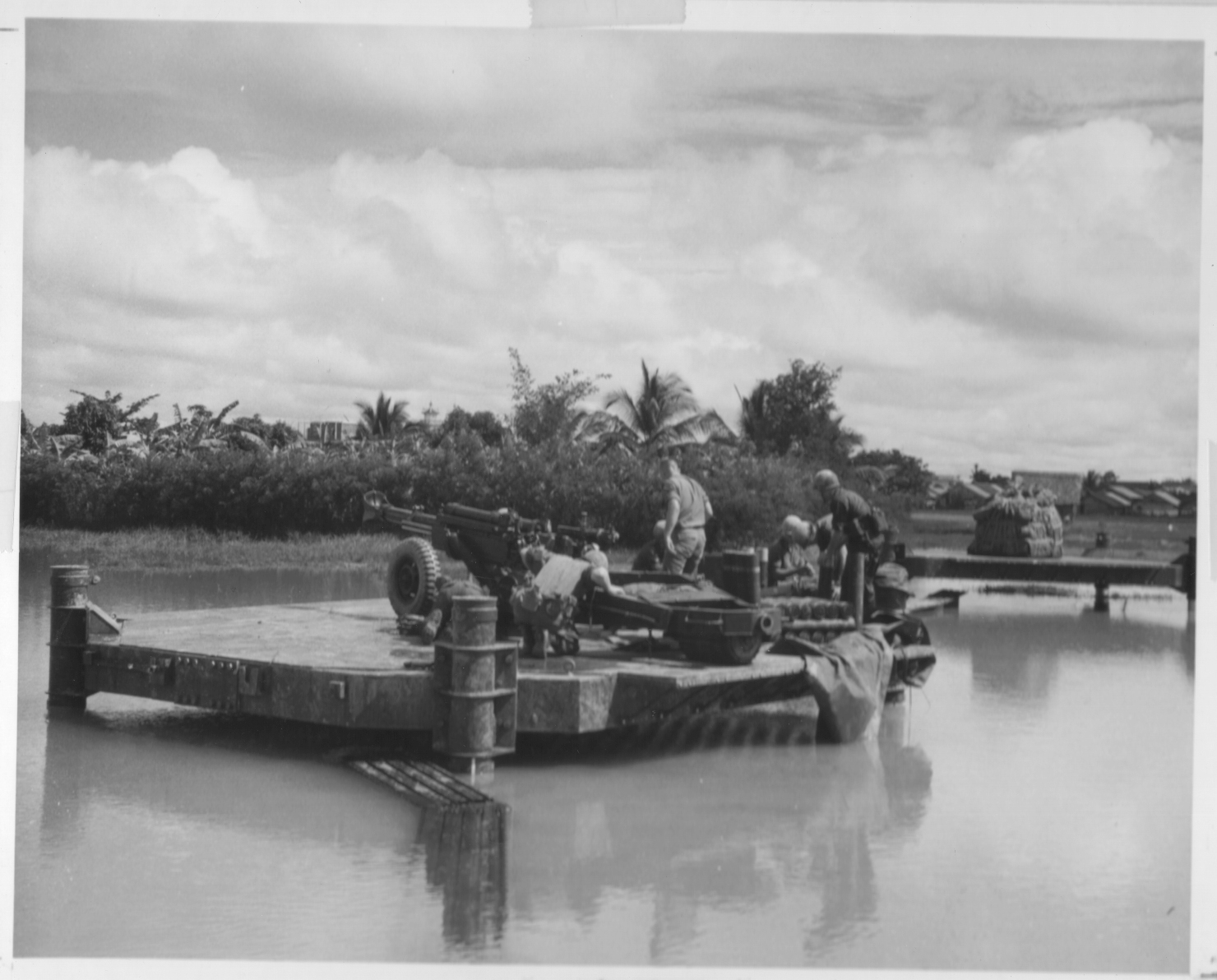
Fixed firing platforms on rivers were found unsatisfactory

France developed the Dinassaut (assault river division) concept early in their effort to fight communist guerrillas in French Indochina. The value of artillery was demonstrated by French ships when coastal Mon Cay became the only French garrison along the Chinese border to survive a 1950 Viet Minh offensive.

During the Vietnam War, the United States employed riverine artillery due to the difficulty of transporting and emplacing artillery pieces in marshy areas. The formation of a riverine task force (composed of 2d Brigade of the 9th Infantry Division and the U.S. Navy River Assault Flotilla 1) increased the importance of artillery support in riverine areas, and fixed locations near river areas proved unsatisfactory. In December 1966, 1st Battalion, 7th Artillery positioned M101A1 105 mm howitzers aboard LCM-6 landing craft, with the intent that the craft be towed to a supported area and moored to a riverbank.

Later, it was established that the LCM-6 was too small to serve effectively, and howitzers were positioned on Navy AMMI pontoon barges. When these proved to difficult to move and to have too deep of a draft, barges formed of Navy P-1 pontoons were the workable solution. M101A1, and later M102 howitzers were mounted onto a baseplate welded to the barge deck, allowing the howitzer to be traversed 360 degrees.

A complete battery of riverine 105 mm artillery consisted of three howitzer barges, and five LCM-8s for support staff such as the Fire Direction Center.

== Romanian riverine artillery ==
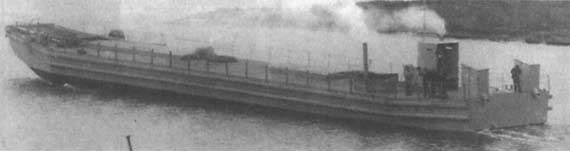
Russian Russud-class barge, fourteen was captured by the Romanians in February 1918

In November 1920, the Regimentul Artileriei Fluviale (Riverine Artillery Regiment) was formed as part of the Romanian Naval Forces. The Regiment had 14 armed barges: 8 armed each with a single 152 mm Canet gun (Russian guns captured in 1918 along with the barges they were mounted on), 4 armed each with four 120 mm guns Canet and 2 armed with two 102 mm guns Obuchov M1910 each. By early 1941, the Regiment had two sections of 152 mm guns, one section of 47 mm Škoda guns and one section of 40 mm Bofors AA guns (each section had two guns).

The Romanian riverine artillery took part in the 1924 suppression of the Tatarbunary Uprising and also saw action during World War II, sinking 1 Soviet armored boat during Operation Munchen.
