= Battle of Nà Sản =

Battle of the First Indochina War

Coordinates: 21.2154°N 104.0360°E

- Part of First Indochina War
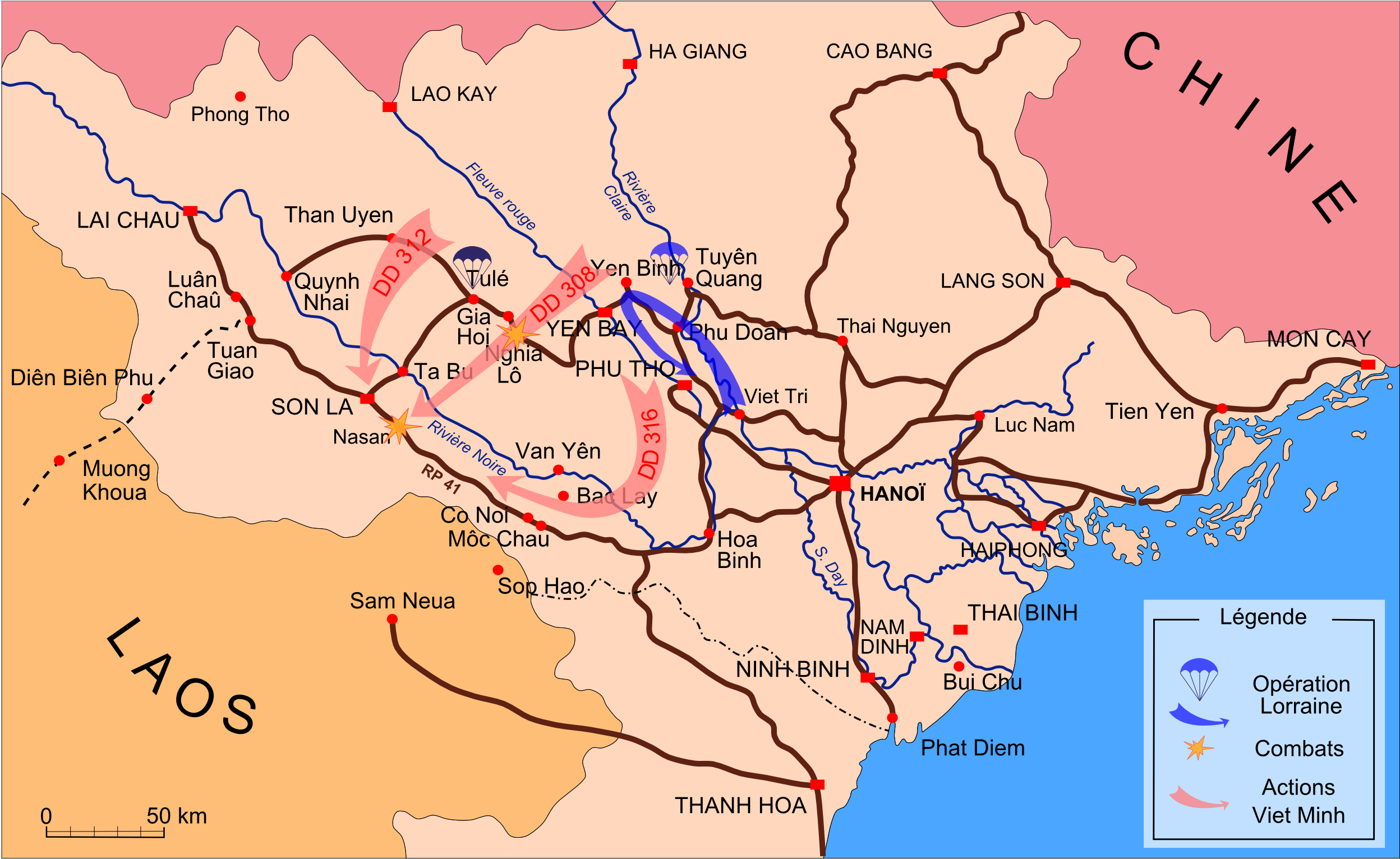
Date	23 November – 2 December 1952
Location	Nà Sản, Sơn La Province, Vietnam
Result	French Union victory; French Union successful defense; French Union successful evacuation later

Belligerents
French Union: France; State of Vietnam; T'ai Federation	Democratic Republic of Vietnam: (North Vietnam) Việt Minh

Commanders and leaders
Jean Gilles Phạm Văn Đổng	(North Vietnam) Võ Nguyên Giáp

Strength
15,000; 6 artillery batteries	3 divisions

Casualties and losses
2nd December only: 6 killed and 20 wounded Total: 300 killed and 640 wounded	Western estimate: 1,000–1,544 killed 1,932 captured 6,000 wounded John Walker claim: 5,000 killed/missing/captured and 2,000 wounded Việt Minh’s report: ~1,400 killed/missing/captured, 2,553 wounded

The Battle of Nà Sản was fought between the French Union and the Việt Minh at Nà Sản, Sơn La Province, during the First Indochina War for control of the T’ai region in Northwest Vietnam. The battle ended with the victory of the French Union (France and State of Vietnam).

== Background ==
=== Military situation ===
==== Battle of Hòa Bình ====
In the Fall of 1950, General Marcel Carpentier decided to withdraw all military forces from Hòa Bình, capital of the Muong region. In November 1951, General De Lattre, Carpentier's replacement, launched an offensive operation against the Việt Minh in Hòa Bình to reclaim an area he saw as vital for France's future in Indochina. According to De Lattre, capturing Hòa Bình would cut the enemy's supply line between Thanh Hóa and Việt Bắc. Psychologically, reclaiming the province would gain support from the Mường, who had supported neither side, but were leaning more toward the Franco-Vietnamese side. In November 1951, De Lattre mobilized ten infantry and eight airborne battalions to mount a decisive operation. Võ Nguyên Giáp counterattacked with three regular divisions, two independent regiments, and regional support troops. The two sides fought hard for Hòa Bình. At the height of the Battle of Hòa Bình, Giáp had 40 battalions fighting his enemies at different locations throughout the province. In January 1952, French forces were winning when De Lattre had to return to France for cancer treatment and General Raoul Salan was appointed to take his place. Salan, who saw the province as an area that was hard to support and to defend, decided to withdraw his troops (Operation Amarante). On 22 February, French troops successfully withdrew from Hòa Bình and regrouped in Xuan Mai two days later.

==== T'ai region ====
Eight months after having successfully defended Hòa Binh, Giáp attacked Nghĩa Lộ in the T'ai region which he failed to take a year earlier. Giáp used four regular divisions (308th, 312th, 316th and artillery division 351st) to attack the province's southeast and the regional regiment 148th to guard the northwest side against reinforcements. In 10 days, Việt Minh forces not only took Nghĩa Lộ but also seized part of Sơn La and Lai Châu from French control. To avoid further losses, Salan launched Operation Lorraine to relieve the Việt Minh pressure in the T'ai region and to serve as a diversion while Nà Sản was being built. The operation, led by General François de Linares, started on 9 November and lasted until 19 November. While the operation was going on, Salan tasked Colonel Jean Gilles with establishing an entrenched fire support base at Nà Sản to stop Giáp's offensive.

=== Terrain ===
Nà Sản, located on Route Provinciale 41 (RP 41), was a valley of 2 km × 1 km surrounded by 24 hills that could serve as natural defense positions. In early October 1952, there was a single outpost and a short airstrip, both guarded by a company under the command of a non-commissioned officer. Salan used the Hanoi-based French Air Force Dakotas to transport troops and material there in order to complete a fortified "base aero-terrestre" or air-land base allowing a direct confrontation with the Việt Minh divisions.

== Prelude ==
=== Planning ===
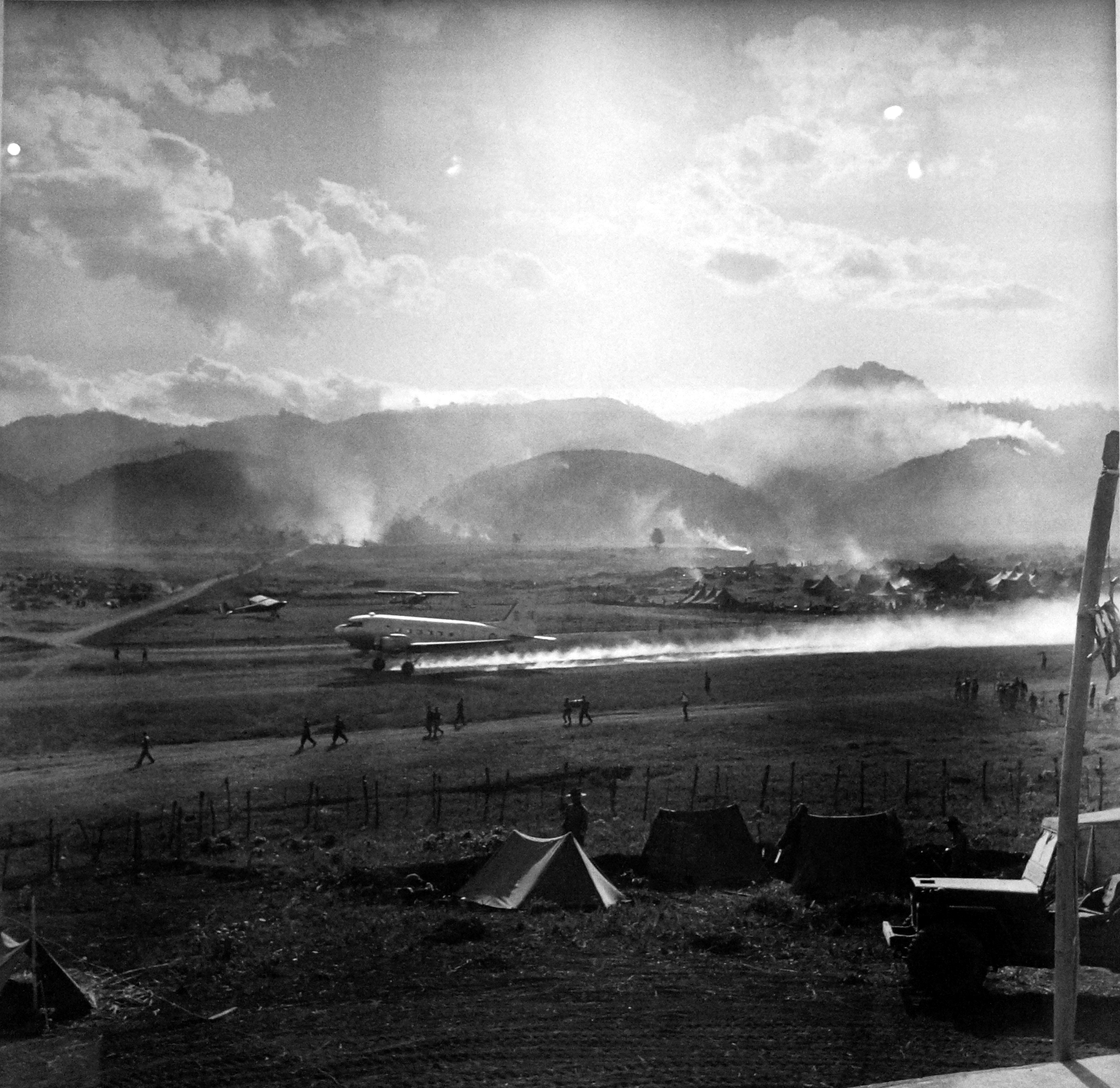
Na San airfield

During the battle, Gilles used a new tactic, called "the hedgehog" (le hérisson), for the first time in Indochina. The hedgehog defense consisted of an outpost surrounded by several armed positions (point d'appui or P.A.). The objective was to provoke an enemy frontal assault, rather than fighting off hit-and-run attacks or falling into ambushes. Nà Sản's hedgehog consisted of 30 P.A. with a complicated trench system, enforced with barbed wires. Its defense forces consisted of 11 battalions (15,000 men) and 6 artillery batteries.

=== Opposing forces ===
==== Franco-Vietnamese forces at Nà Sản ====
Colonel Jean Gilles, Nà Sản Commander

Groupement Lansade

- 2nd battalion, 1st Algerian Light Infantry Regiment (II/1^{er} Régiment de tirailleurs algériens)
- 3rd battalion, 3rd Foreign Infantry Regiment (III/3^{e} régiment étranger d'infanterie), commandant Favreau
- 2nd battalion, 6th Moroccan Light Infantry Regiment (II/6^{e} Régiment de tirailleurs marocains)

Groupement mobile Vietnamien (Vietnamese Mobile Group)

- 1st Thai Battalion (BM/BT 1)
- 2nd Thai Battalion (BT 2)
- 3rd Thai Battalion (BT 3), commandant Vaudrey
- 55th BVN (55^{e} Bataillon Vietnamien), capitaine Phạm Văn Đổng
- 3rd Battalion, 5th Foreign Infantry Regiment (III/5^{e} régiment étranger d'infanterie), chef de bataillon Dufour

Groupement parachutiste (Airborne Group)

Lieutenant Colonel Paul Ducournau

- 1st Foreign Airborne Battalion (1^{er} bataillon étranger de parachutistes or 1e BEP), chef de bataillon Brothier
- 2nd Foreign Airborne Battalion (2^{e} bataillon étranger de parachutistes or 2e BEP), chef de bataillon Bloch
- 3rd Colonial Airborne Battalion (3^{e} bataillon de parachutistes coloniaux or 3e BPC), capitaine Bonnigal

Artillerie (Artillery)

- 5th Vietnamese Artillery Group (5e GAVN with 2 batteries of 105 howitzers)
- 41st Colonial Artillery Regiment (41^{e} régiment d'artillerie coloniale)
- Foreign Legion Mortar Company (CMLE had one section with four 120 mm guns and one section with six 81 mm mortars)

Génie (Engineer)

Commandant Casso

- 6 sections (2 companies)

===== Air support =====
Aéronaval

- 8th flotilla (Privateer)
- 9th flotilla (SB2C Helldiver)
- 12th flotilla (Hellcat)

Armée de l'air (Air Force)

- Gascogne 1/19 Bombing Group (B-26)

==== Việt Minh attacking forces ====
General Võ Nguyên Giáp, Commander of the Tai region Campaign

Brigade 308 (Đại đoàn 308)

Commander : Colonel Vương Thừa Vũ

- Regiment 36
- Regiment 88
- Regiment 102

Brigade 312 (Đại đoàn 312)

Commander : Colonel Lê Trọng Tấn

- Regiment 141
- Regiment 165
- Regiment 209

Brigade 316 (Đại đoàn 316)

Commander : Colonel Lê Quảng Ba

- Regiment 98
- Regiment 174
- Regiment 176

== Battle ==
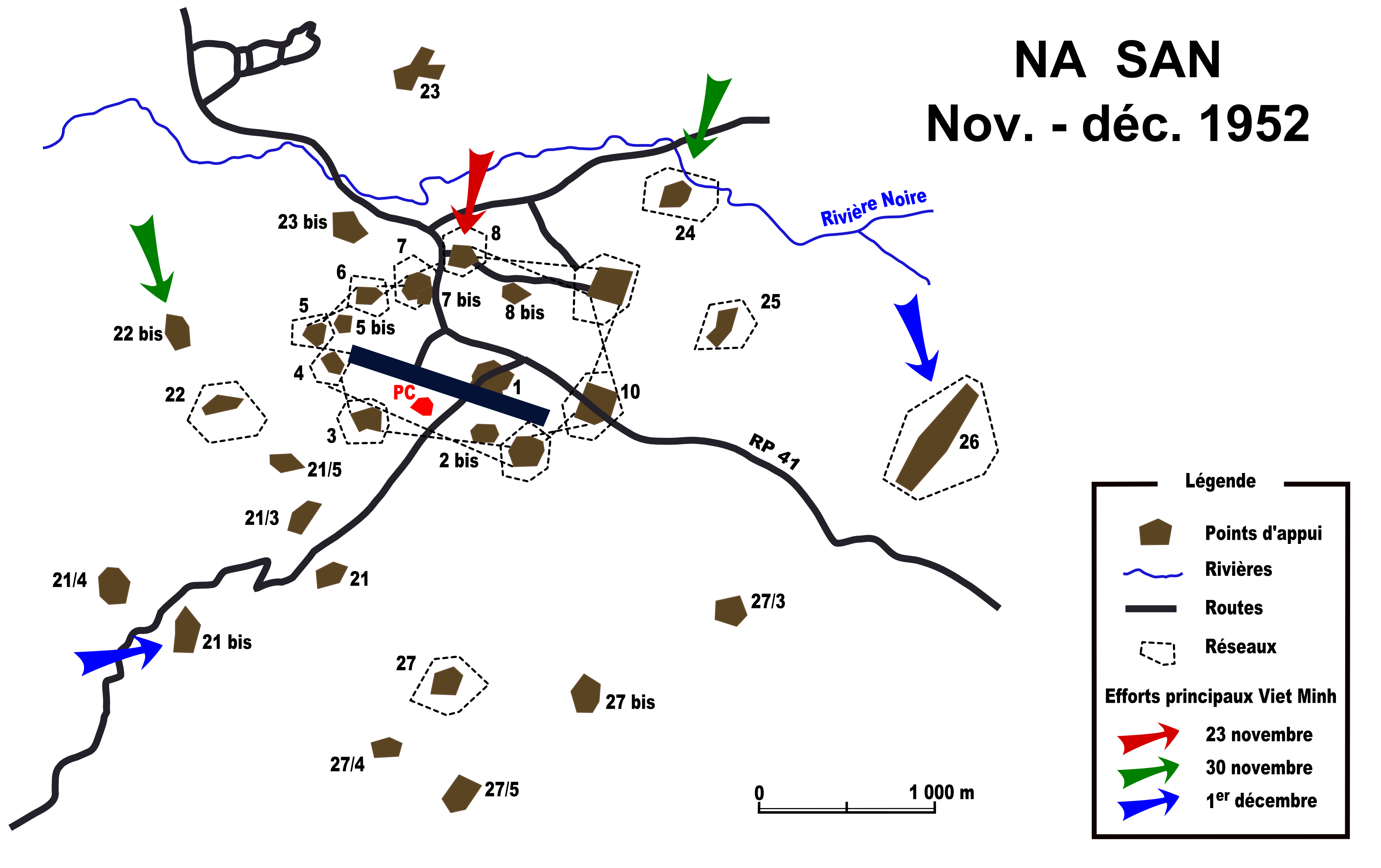

On 23 November at 20:00 Việt Minh forces from the 88/308 twice attacked the 110 legionnaires of the 11th Company, Third Battalion, Fifth Foreign Infantry Reg at P.A. 8 and were twice pushed back by the entrenched Franco-Vietnamese troops, losing 64 killed.

From 24 to 30 November Việt Minh forces made night attacks on different points to test French defense. During the days, defending troops patrolled within their fire-support range for reconnaissance.

At 20:00 on 30 November, Việt Minh forces from nine battalions attacked P.A. 22 bis and 24, respectively located east and west of the entrenched headquarters. P.A. 22 bis, defended by a company of the 2nd Thai battalion (BT2) was overrun by the 115th battalion (165/312) after nine hours of relentless attacks, of the 225 men defending the P.A., only one squad was able to escape back to the airfield. At 03:00 after probing attacks the Việt Minh launched an intense attack on P.A. 24, the Moroccan tirailleurs with the II/6e RTM resisted three hours of constant attacks by the 102/308 before surrendering.

Gilles, who wanted to take back the two points so close to Nà Sản's headquarters, launched a counter-attack at dawn on 1 December. After a barrage of artillery fire, two companies of the 2e BEP stormed and took back 22 bis. After seven hard-fought hours, the 3e BPC took back P.A. 24. At 21:00, Giap's forces launched their all-out offensive at Nà Sản. Wave after wave of soldiers relentlessly assaulted several P.A.s, especially 21 bis and 26; sometimes the attackers outnumbered the defenders fifteen to one. All night, Dakotas dropped flares over the battlefields to give support troops visibility to defend the positions. Defending forces continuously fired their cannons into Việt Minh human waves while B-26s, Hellcats and Privateers dropped bombs and napalm onto enemy attack waves and positions. The battles raged on until mid-morning on 2 December when all attacks abruptly stopped, leaving behind an eerie silence.

== Aftermath ==
On 4 December after nearly two weeks of trying to overrun Nà Sản, Giáp withdrew his troops. The French estimate Viet Minh suffered 1,544 dead and 1,932 wounded prisoners. The defending Franco-Vietnamese forces lost close to two battalions.

Despite the victory, France was looking for a political solution to get out of Indochina and Nà Sản was abandoned in August 1953. The tactician Gilles again outmaneuvered Giáp by evacuating the whole camp without a single loss. In "Ba sinh hương lửa", Doan Quoc Sy quoted a Việt Minh officer with the forces surrounding Nà Sản, "The enemy withdrew without our knowledge ... until there was only one battalion left ... the enemy was able to escape and save its entire forces because of our poor military intelligence".

The hedgehog tactics earned the French a victory at Nà Sản. As a result, the hedgehog defense became standard practice, and was applied on a larger scale at Điện Biên Phủ. The French hoped that by repeating the strategy on a much larger scale, they would be able to lure Giáp into committing the bulk of his forces in a massed assault. This would enable superior French artillery, armour and air support to decimate the exposed Viet Minh forces.

After the battle, Giáp argued that the failure to overrun the base could not have been due to fatigue or because the units were no longer properly organized due to weeks of fighting. Giáp believed that the only possible justification was that the French “hedgehog” was a new defensive class and, because his units had not come across such a cluster of entrenched camps before, they did not know how to destroy it. He noted that with the hedgehog, the French could exploit the fact that it was impossible for the Việt Minh to maintain a great number of combatants in the mountain and forest areas for a long time, because of the eventual shortage of food and limited means of transport. The French had only to wait for the Việt Minh to withdrawal, and then move from their cluster of entrenched camps to reoccupy the abandoned posts. The cluster of entrenched camps had become a new challenge for the advance of his army.

=== Quotes ===
- "... Souhaitons que Giap commette l'erreur d'y venir!" ("Let's wish that Giap makes the mistake by coming!"). —Bảo Đại
- "... sans elle (l'aviation), Nà Sản n’était pas possible et je perdais la bataille du Nord-Ouest -" ( ... without it [air-support], Nà Sản would not be possible and I would've lost the Northwest battle). —Raoul Salan
- "... it (the battle) wasn't a defeat—but we suffered losses." Võ Nguyên Giáp
- "Nous ne sommes pas entamés! Ca tient partout! C’est un déluge de feu indescriptible." ("We have not been breached! All (positions) hold! It is an indescribable deluge of fire.") —Jean Gilles

== See also ==
- Battle of Route Coloniale 4
- Battle of the Day River
- Operation Lorraine
- Battle of Dien Bien Phu

== Bibliography ==
- Clodfelter, M. (2008). Warfare and armed conflicts : a statistical encyclopedia of casualty and other figures, 1494-2007. Jefferson, North Carolina: McFarland. ISBN 978-0786433193.
- Davidson, Phillip (1998). Vietnam at War. Presidio Press. ISBN 0-89141-306-5.
- Windrow, Martin (2018). French Foreign Légionnaire Vs Viet Minh Insurgent. Bloomsbury Publishing. ISBN 978-1472828934.
- Dufour, Nicolas (October 1999). NASAN, La victoire oubliée (1952–1953) [Nasan, the forgotten victory (1952–1953)] (in French). Economica. ISBN 2-7178-3940-2.
- Helling, Thomas (2024). The Final Days of Empire France's Bloodied Exit from Indochina (PDF). Army University Press. ISBN 9781940804774. This article incorporates text from this source, which is in the public domain.
- Salan, Raoul Albin Louis (1971). Memoires: fin d'un empire, tome 2: Le Viet Minh mon adversaire [Memoires: the end of an empire, volume 2: Viet Minh, my adversary] (in French). Paris: Presses de la Cite.
- Simpson, Howard R. (August 1992). Tiger in the Barbed Wire: An American in Vietnam, 1952–1991. Brassey's Inc. ISBN 0-7881-5148-7.
- AFRVN Military History Section, J-5, Strategic Planning and Policy. Quân Sử 4: Quân lực Việt Nam Cộng Hòa trong giai-đoạn hình-thành: 1946–1955 (reprinted from the 1972 edition in Taiwan, DaiNam Publishing, 1977) [AFRVN, the formation period, 1946–1955] (in Vietnamese).
- Doan Quoc Sy (1962). Ba sinh hương lửa [Three periods of Fire] (in Vietnamese). Saigon: Sáng Tạo.
- Dinh Xuan Lam (1998). Lich Su 12, Tap 2 [12th Grade History, Volume 2] (in Vietnamese). HCM City, Vietnam: Ministry of Education.
- Logevall, Frederik (2012). Embers of war: the fall of an empire and the making of America's Vietnam. Random House. ISBN 9780375756474.
