= Operation Lorraine =

French military operation of the First Indochina War

- Part of First Indochina War
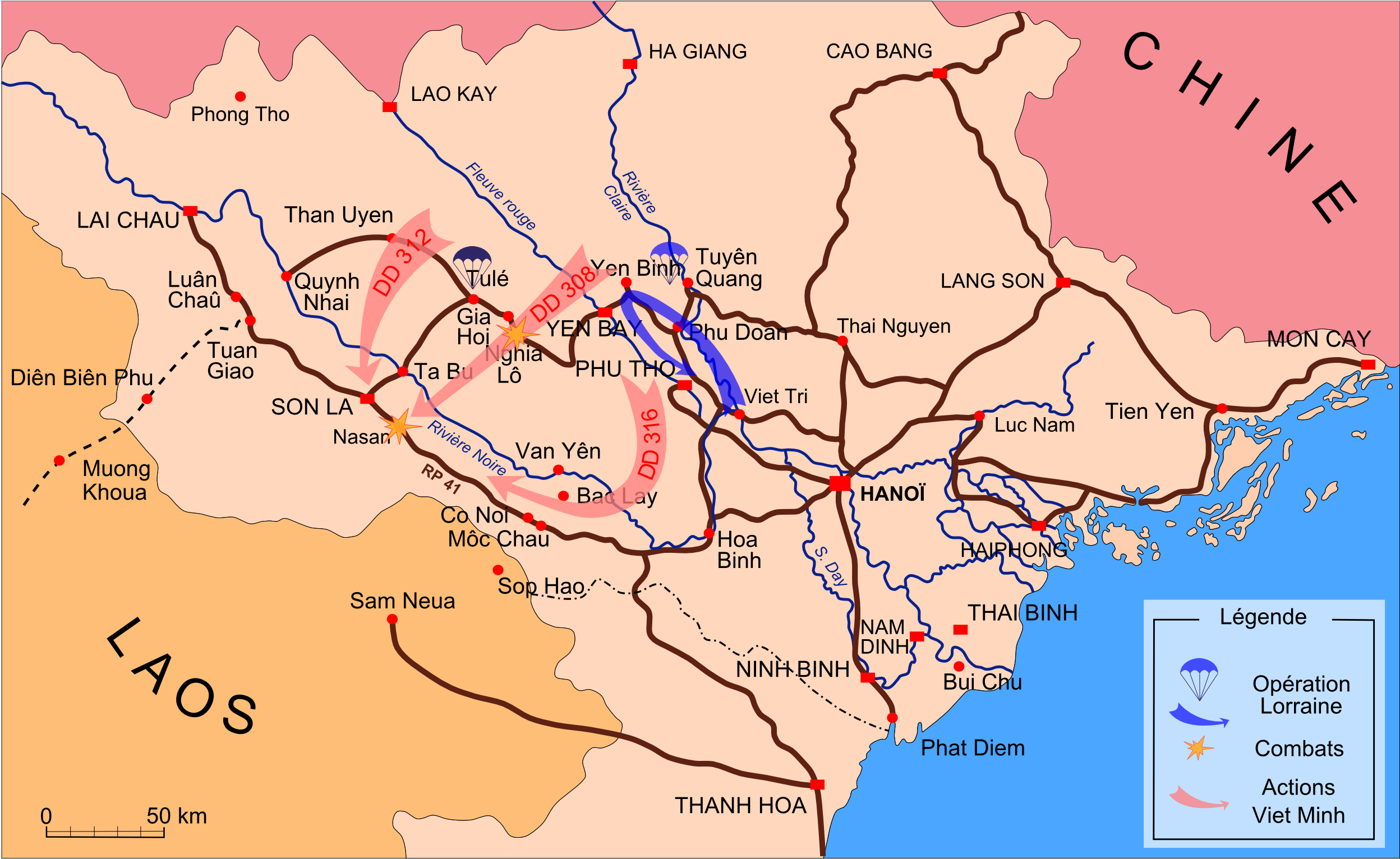
- Movements before and during Operation Lorraine
Date	October 29 – November 8, 1952
Location	Nghĩa Lộ, Yên Bái Province, Vietnam
Result	French victory

Belligerents
French Union: France; French Indochina; State of Vietnam	Democratic Republic of Vietnam: (North Vietnam) Việt Minh

Commanders and leaders
Raoul Salan; Louis Dodelier	Lê Trọng Tấn; Vương Thừa Vũ

Strength
30,000	Unknown

Casualties and losses
1,200 killed, wounded, missing	Unknown

Operation Lorraine was a French military operation of the First Indochina War.

== Background ==
On 15 October 1952, a regiment of the Việt Minh 312th Division surrounded the French garrison at Gia Hoi 25 miles southeast of Nghĩa Lộ. In response on 16 October the French command dropped the 6th Colonial Parachute Battalion (6 BPC), commanded by Major Marcel Bigeard into Tu Le, midway between Gia Hoi and Nghĩa Lộ to cover the retreat of French forces to the west bank of the Black River. On 17 October two regiments of the Việt Minh 308th Division attacked Nghĩa Lộ overrunning the post in one hour. Following the loss of Nghĩa Lộ, the other French outposts were abandoned and the French fell back towards the Black River with the 6 BPC fighting a running rearguard action.

== The plan ==
In order to divert the Việt Minh from pressing their attack on the Black River General Salan planned to launch an offensive against Việt Minh base areas near Phú Thọ, Phú Doan and Tuyên Quang.

Operation Lorraine was the largest operation attempted to date by the French Union forces., the forces involved included four Groupe Mobiles, one airborne group comprising three parachute battalions, two infantry battalions, two armoured sub-groups, two tank destroyer and reconnaissance squadrons, two Dinassaut, two artillery battalions and engineering units.

Operation Lorraine was to be launched in four stages as follows:

- from October 29-November 8 a bridgehead would be opened across the Red River in the direction of Phú Thọ
- the Phú Thọ bridgehead would be enlarged and the forces joined by a second column coming along Route 2 from Việt Trì, the two volumes would then continue along Route 2 arriving at Phú Doan at the same time as the airborne assault. The Dinassaut would prevent any Việt Minh from escaping by water
- the French forces would destroy all Việt Minh supply depots and bases in the Phú Doan area
- depending on the Việt Minh reaction the French would either permanently occupy the area or push on further into Việt Minh territory

== The operation ==
The operation was launched on October 29, the French took Phú Thọ on November 5, Phu Doan on November 9 and finally Phù Yên on November 14. The French assault columns were delayed by poor roads unsuitable for armoured vehicles, Việt Minh sabotage and the low-lying waterlogged terrain. The assault on Phú Yên is notable as a tank company of Mobile Group 1 discovered two Molotov trucks manufactured and supplied by the Soviet Union. This was the first proof of Soviet military assistance to the Viet Minh and by the end of the Indochina War, close to 800 Molotovs would be delivered to the Viet Minh.

General Giáp planned to wait until the French supply lines were overextended at which point they could be harassed and eventually forced to withdraw. Instead of cancelling his offensive into the T'ai country, Giáp detached Regiment 36 of the 308th Division and Regiment 176 of the 316th Division to defend the important supply bases at Yên Bái and Thái Nguyên.

While the French seized large amounts of stores, the Việt Minh withdrew rather than engaging and the operation had failed to distract Giáp from the T'ai country. General Salan cancelled the operation on November 14, beginning to withdraw back to the De Lattre Line.

The only major fighting during the operation came during the withdrawal, when the Việt Minh Regiment 36 ambushed Groupe Mobiles 1 and 4 on Route 2 in a narrow valley near Chan Muong on morning of November 17. The Việt Minh managed to blow up one of the leading tanks, completely blocking the road and then, covered by heavy weapons fire from the surrounding hills, proceeded to methodically destroy the convoy. French air support eased the pressure on the forces caught in the valley and then in the afternoon the 2nd Battalion, 2nd Foreign Infantry Regiment and the Battalion de Marche Indochinois (BMI) inside the valley and the lead elements of Groupe Mobile 1 outside the ambush area counterattacked against the Việt Minh, culminating with a bayonet charge by the BMI. At this point the Việt Minh disengaged and the withdrawal could continue with the column arriving at Ngoc Tap at 22:30. The French had lost 56 dead, 125 wounded and 133 missing and 12 vehicles including 1 tank and 6 half-tracks destroyed.

Overall the French lost around 1,200 men during the operation. The operation failed to divert the Việt Minh offensive against the T'ai country or seriously damage its logistical network.
