= 14th Infantry Division (France) =

French Army infantry division (1873–1994)

- 14e régiment d'infanterie
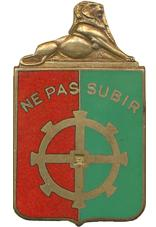
- Active: 1815; 1873 - 1940; 9 February 1945 - 30 April 1946; 16 June 1954 - 1962; 1973 - 1993
- Country: France
- Branch: French Army
- Role: Infantry
- Size: Division
- Nickname: Aces Division
- Motto: Ne Pas Subir
- Engagements: Napoleonic Wars: Hundred Days campaign; World War I World War II; Algerian War; Cold War

Commanders
- Notable commanders: Jean de Lattre de Tassigny

The 14th Infantry Division (14e DI) was an infantry division of the French Army which took part in the Napoleonic Wars, the First World War, the Second World War and the Algerian War.

== History ==
=== Napoleonic Wars ===
The 14th Infantry Division already fought in the Hundred Days campaign in 1815, as part of General Gérard's 4th Infantry Corps, where it was abandoned by its commander, General of Division Count de Ghaisnes de Bourmont, who defected to the allied camp.

=== World War I ===
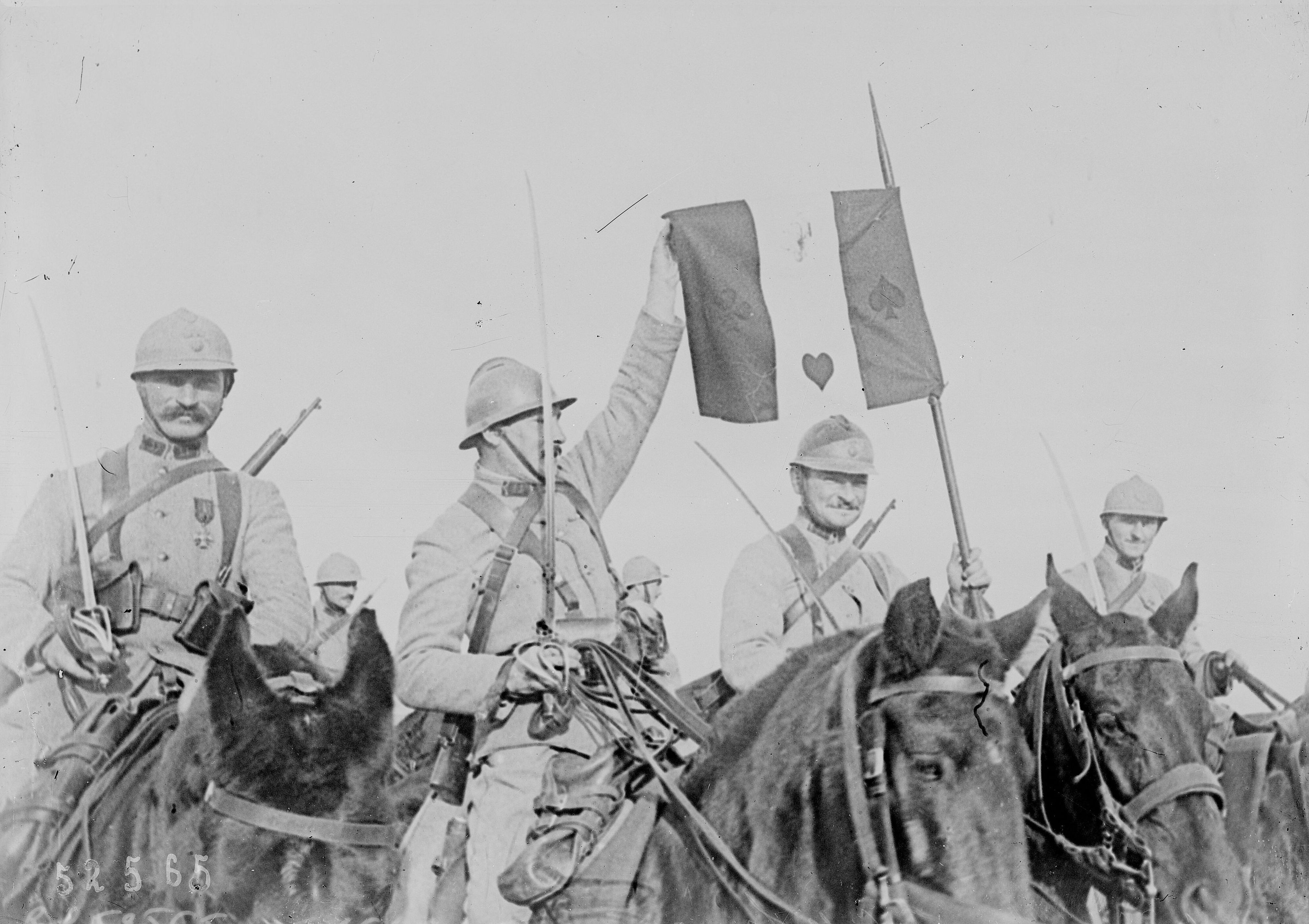
Cavalry of the division, December 1918

The Division was recreated in 1873 in Belfort. At the beginning of the First World War, it was mobilised in the 7th Military Region and formed part of the 7th Army Corps from August 1914 to November 1918. It received the nickname Aces Division in 1917 for its splendid performance during the Third Battle of Champagne.

=== World War II ===
On 10 May 1940 the 14th DI was commanded by General of Division Jean de Lattre de Tassigny, who would later become Marshal of France. The Division was first attached to the reserve of the General Headquarters, but between 15 May and 15 June, it fought at Rethel, Thugny-Trugny and in Champagne, and then withdrew to the Marne and the Loire. Exceptionally, it retained its cohesion throughout the retreat, recovering lost soldiers from other units and equipment abandoned or stored in military depots. After the Armistice, it was regrouped in Clermont-Ferrand and dissolved in August 1940.

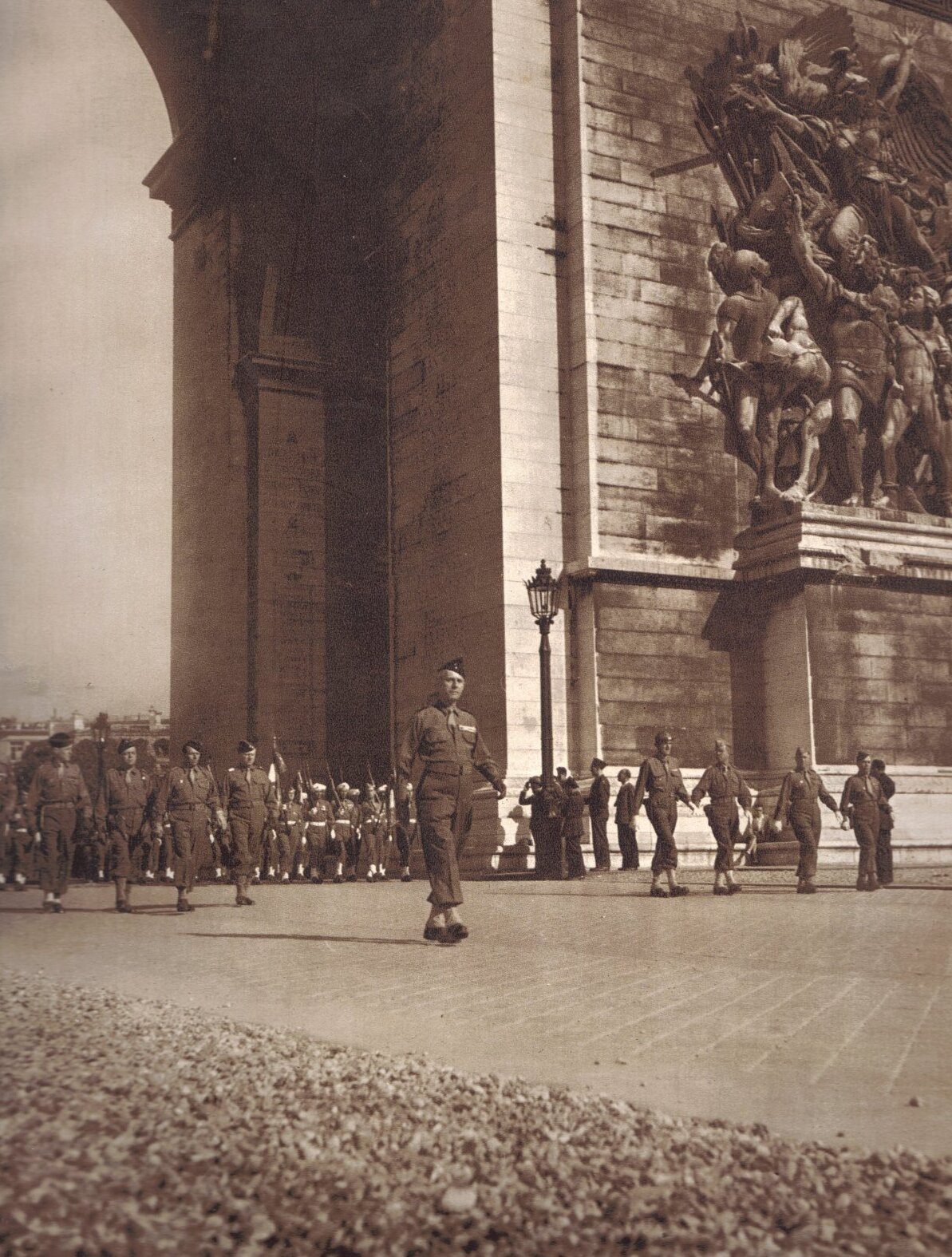
The division marching through Paris behind Raoul Salan, 18 June 1945

The 14th DI was recreated on 9 February 1945, by the amalgamation of units of the French forces of the interior (FFI). Commanded by General Raoul Salan, its headquarters was located in Buhl, Haut-Rhin. Most of its elements had already fought in the Vosges and in Alsace during the winter. It was integrated into the 1st Army of General Jean de Lattre de Tassigny, under the wider banner of the French Liberation Army. Sent to the Rhine on 23 March, the division entered Germany on 10 April. Protecting the rear of the 1st French Army, the 14th Division ended the war on Lake Constance. It was disbanded there on 30 April 1946.

=== Algerian War ===
The 14th Infantry Division was recreated on 16 June 1954, at the same time as the 11th DI.
Commanded by General Lavaud, it was sent to Northern Africa where it fought first in Tunisia in the Sfax region.
In mid-1955, the division was transferred to the region of Constantine, Algeria.
The Division was disbanded in 1962.

=== Cold War ===
A new 14th DI was created in 1973, which was based in Lyon.
It was renamed 14th Light Armored Division in 1984, and disbanded in 1993, when the Cold War had come to an end.

== Sources ==
- Vaïsse, Maurice (2017-03-09). "Jean de Lattre de Tassigny". FranceArchives.
- Etat-major des armée. "Les armées françaises dans la Grande guerre. Tome X. 10,2 / Ministère de la guerre, état-major de l'armée, service historique". Gallica (in French). pp. 111–118.
