= Montfa, Tarn =

Montfa
- Commune
- Coat of arms
- Location of Montfa
- Location within France Location within Occitanie
- Coordinates: 43°41′56″N 2°14′36″E
- Country: France
- Region: Occitania
- Department: Tarn
- Arrondissement: Castres
- Canton: Castres-2
- Intercommunality: Sidobre Vals et Plateaux

Government
  - Mayor (2022–2026): Thierry Raimbault
- Area^{1}: 10.69 km^{2} (4.13 sq mi)
- Elevation: 320 m (1,050 ft)
- Highest elevation: 390 m (1,280 ft)
- Lowest elevation: 214 m (702 ft)
- Population (2023): 464
  - Density: 43.4/km^{2} (112/sq mi)
- Time zone: UTC+01:00 (CET)
  - Summer (DST): UTC+02:00 (CEST)
- INSEE/Postal code: 81177 /81210
- ^{1} French Land Register data, which excludes lakes, ponds, glaciers > 1 km^{2} (0.386 sq mi or 247 acres) and river estuaries.

Montfa (French pronunciation: [mɔ̃fa]; Occitan: Montfan) is a commune in the Tarn department in southern France.

== See also ==
- Communes of the Tarn department
