= Roquecourbe =

- Commune
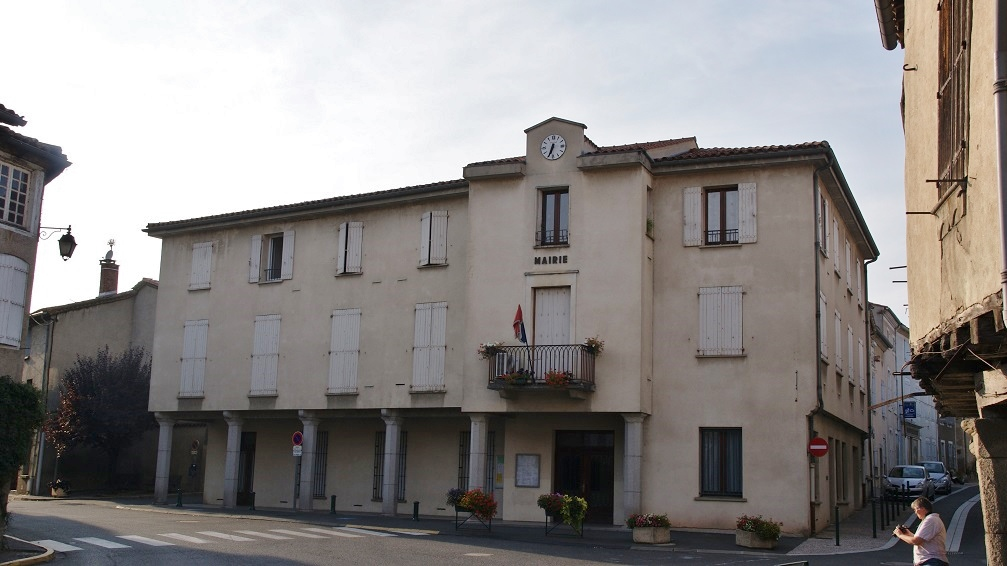
- Town hall
- Location of Roquecourbe
- Location within France Location within Occitanie
- Coordinates: 43°39′55″N 2°17′30″E
- Country: France
- Region: Occitania
- Department: Tarn
- Arrondissement: Castres
- Canton: Castres-2
- Intercommunality: Sidobre Vals et Plateaux

Government
  - Mayor (2020–2026): Michel Petit
- Area^{1}: 16.65 km^{2} (6.43 sq mi)
- Elevation: 210 m (690 ft)
- Highest elevation: 409 m (1,342 ft)
- Lowest elevation: 202 m (663 ft)
- Population (2023): 2,172
  - Density: 130.5/km^{2} (337.9/sq mi)
- Time zone: UTC+01:00 (CET)
  - Summer (DST): UTC+02:00 (CEST)
- INSEE/Postal code: 81227 /81210
- ^{1} French Land Register data, which excludes lakes, ponds, glaciers > 1 km^{2} (0.386 sq mi or 247 acres) and river estuaries.

Roquecourbe (French pronunciation: [ʁɔk.kuʁb]; Occitan: Ròcacorba) is a commune in the Tarn department and Occitanie region of southern France.

The name of the settlement – Ròca Corba in Occitan – means "curved rock".

This is the birthplace of former Prime Minister of France Émile Combes.

== Population ==
Historical population
Year	Pop.	±% p.a.
1968	2,012	—
1975	2,271	+1.74%
1982	2,213	−0.37%
1990	2,266	+0.30%
1999	2,209	−0.28%
2007	2,236	+0.15%
2012	2,309	+0.64%
2017	2,206	−0.91%
2023	2,172	−0.26%
Source: INSEE

== See also ==
- Communes of the Tarn department
