= Operation Brochet =

- Part of the First Indochina War
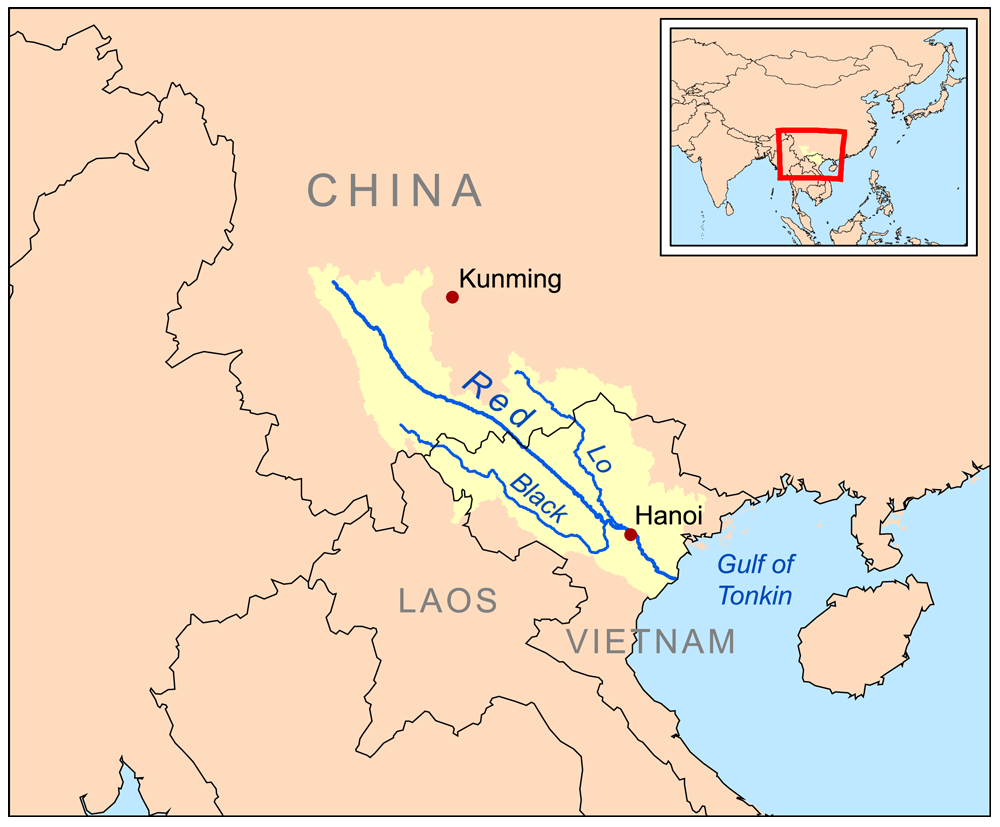
- Location of the Red River Delta
Date	August – October 1953
Location	near Nam Dinh, Red River Delta, French Indochina
Result	Việt Minh victory

Belligerents
French Union: France; French Indochina; State of Vietnam	Democratic Republic of Vietnam: (North Vietnam) Việt Minh

Strength
~9,000 – 15,300	~10,000

Casualties and losses
96 casualties	10 dead

Operation Brochet took place during the French Indochina War, between August and October 1953. A combined arms operation, Brochet involved 18 battalions of the French Expeditionary and Vietnamese National Armies fighting against the 42nd and 50th Viet Minh Regiments, fighting in the southern reaches of the Red River Delta near Tonkin in North Vietnam. The 1st and 2nd Parachute Battalions of the French Foreign Legion (BEP), and the 1st and 3rd Colonial Parachute Battalions (BPC) took part, as did forces of the Vietnamese National Army. Their objective was to sweep the Delta and remove Viet Minh influence.

Brochet enjoyed only limited success. By October 11, 1 BEP had lost 96 men against only 10 confirmed Viet Minh war dead, and despite French efforts between 5,000 and 7,000 of the Delta villages remained under Viet Minh control.
