= Saint-Germier, Tarn =

Saint-Germier
- Commune
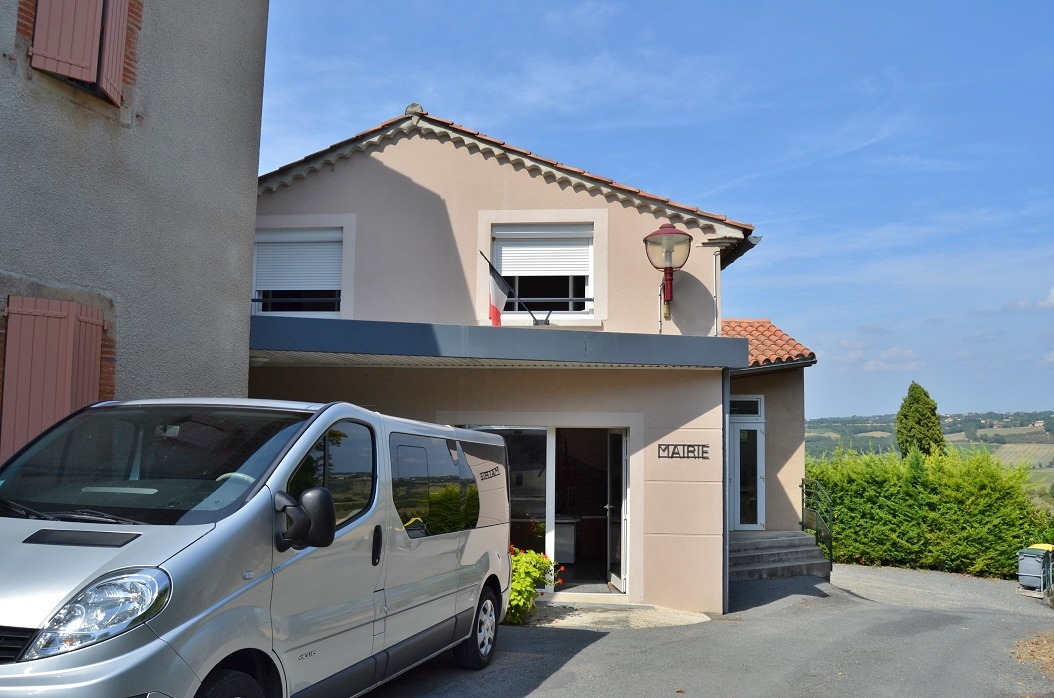
- Saint-Germier town hall

- Coat of arms
- Location of Saint-Germier
- Location within France Location within Occitanie
- Coordinates: 43°40′45″N 2°13′49″E
- Country: France
- Region: Occitania
- Department: Tarn
- Arrondissement: Castres
- Canton: Castres-2
- Intercommunality: Sidobre Vals et Plateaux

Government
  - Mayor (2020–2026): Jean-Michel Talmant
- Area^{1}: 4.16 km^{2} (1.61 sq mi)
- Elevation: 309 m (1,014 ft)
- Highest elevation: 317 m (1,040 ft)
- Lowest elevation: 220 m (720 ft)
- Population (2023): 169
  - Density: 40.6/km^{2} (105/sq mi)
- Time zone: UTC+01:00 (CET)
  - Summer (DST): UTC+02:00 (CEST)
- INSEE/Postal code: 81252 /81210
- ^{1} French Land Register data, which excludes lakes, ponds, glaciers > 1 km^{2} (0.386 sq mi or 247 acres) and river estuaries.

Saint-Germier (French pronunciation: [sɛ̃ ʒɛʁmje]; Occitan: Sant Germièr) is a commune in the Tarn department in southern France.

== See also ==
- Communes of the Tarn department
