= Jean Gilles (French Army officer) =

French general

- Born: 14 October 1904; Perpignan, France
- Died: 10 August 1961 (aged 56); Mont-Louis, France
- Military career
- Allegiance: France
- Branch: French Army
- Service years: 1924–1961
- Rank: Général de corps d'armée
- Commands: 1er DBCCP; GOMRN; 25th Parachute Division; Corps d’Armée de Constantine
- Conflicts: Rif War; World War II; First Indochina War; Algerian War; Suez Crisis
- Awards: Grand Cross of the Legion of Honor

Jean Marcellin Joseph Calixte Gilles (14 October 1904 – 10 August 1961) was a French Army general who served in World War II and several colonial conflicts. A paratrooper, Gilles led the French defence during the Battle of Na San and the initial paratrooper landings at the Battle of Dien Bien Phu during the French Indochina War, as well as serving in Algeria. For near the entirety of his career he fought with a glass eye, having lost an eye at 18.

== Early life ==
Gilles was born in Perpignan, France on 14 October 1904. His father, Joseph Gilles, was killed in the First World War. At age 12, Jean enrolled in a military school and at age 18, entered the renowned Saint-Cyr Military Academy, where he lost an eye in a training accident, replacing it with one made of glass.

On leaving school he was assigned to 24e régiment de tirailleurs sénégalais (24th Regiment Senegalese Infantry) and took part in the Rif War in northern Morocco, where he received his first citation, and the Medal of Alfonso XIII of Spain. He served as a Camel Corps officer until leaving Morocco with the rank of captain in 1938.

== World War II ==
He was assigned to the 7e division d'infanterie coloniale (7th Colonial Infantry Division) from 1939 to 1940. Demobilized in France in 1942, he tried to reach North Africa to join the French resistance but was captured and imprisoned in Spain. Finally released for medical reasons, he enlisted in the 9e division d'infanterie coloniale (9th Colonial Infantry Division) and took command of 2e bataillon du 13e régiment de tirailleurs sénégalais (2nd Battalion, 13th Regiment Senegalese Infantry).

Gilles took part in the capture of Elba in June 1944 and then landed in Provence and with 1re armée française (1st French Army), participated in the liberation of southern and eastern France and the 1945 campaign into Germany.

== Indochina ==
As deputy commanding officer of the 23e régiment d'infanterie coloniale (23rd Colonial Infantry Regiment), he was sent to Indochina in October 1945 with the rank of lieutenant colonel. Following the landing at Haiphong March 6, 1946, he was promoted to colonel and named to the staff of General Philippe Leclerc.

He returned to Europe in 1947, where he held the positions of chief of police of the colonial armored cavalry regiment in Germany and, after a stint at the military school, became commander of 1re demi brigade de commandos parachutistes coloniaux (1st Colonial Airborne Demi- Brigade). Gilles earned his parachutist wings in 1949.

In 1951, he returned to Indochina and took a prominent role in the Battle of Nà Sản (September–December 1952). He was promoted to brigadier general December 23, 1952 and became commander of TAPI (Airborne Troops in Indochina). He took part in Operation Castor, the early phase of the Battle of Dien Bien Phu in November 1953.

== Algeria ==
Gilles returned to France in March 1954 and was given command of the 25e division infanterie parachutiste (25th Airborne Infantry Division). During the Suez Canal crisis of late 1956, he commanded the elite 11e régiment parachutiste de choc (11th Shock Airborne Regiment) in the Suez Crisis. In 1958 he became commander of the Army Corps of Constantine.

== After Algeria ==
On his return from Algeria, Gilles took command of the 5th Military Region in Toulouse. His son, Michel Gilles, was killed in action in Algeria on 2 February 1961. Jean died of a heart attack in August that same year.

== Decorations ==
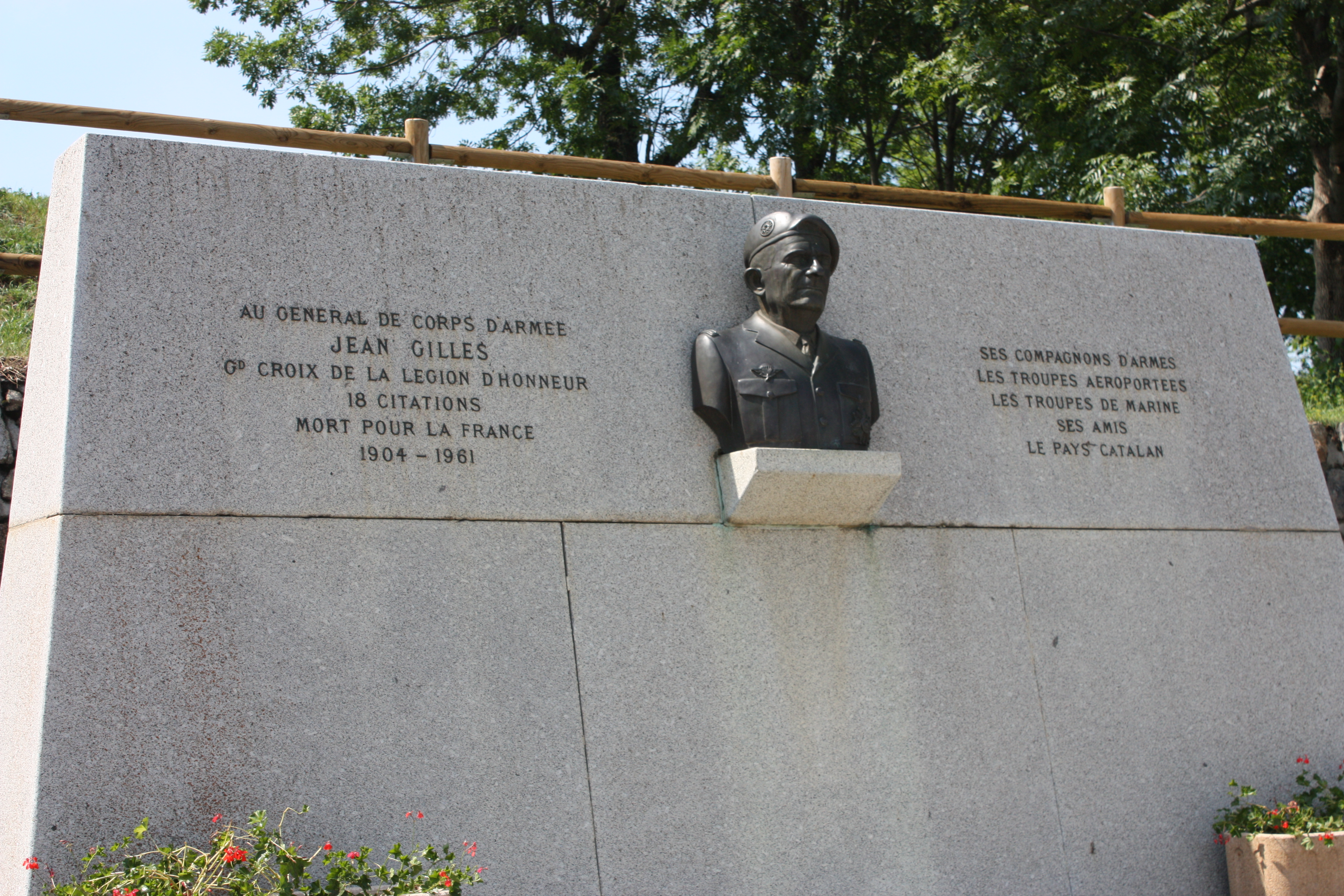
Gilles Monument in Mont-Louis

- Grand Cross of the National Order of the Legion of Honour (Grand-Croix de la Légion d'honneur)
- Croix de guerre des TOE
- Croix de Guerre 1939-1945
- Croix de la valeur Militaire
- Médaille de l'Aéronautique
- Distinguish cross
- Médaille des Evadés
- 18 citations
- Mort pour la France
