= De Lattre Line =

- Red River Delta, Vietnam

Site information
- Type: Defensive line
- Controlled by: French Union until 1954
- Open to the public: Yes
- Condition: Abandoned

Site history
- Built: 1950–1954
- Built by: Jean de Lattre de Tassigny
- In use: 1950–1954
- Materials: Concrete, steel, iron
- Battles/wars: First Indochina War: Battle of Vĩnh Yên; Battle of Mạo Khê; Battle of the Day River

The De Lattre Line, named after General Jean de Lattre de Tassigny, was a line of concrete fortifications, obstacles, and weapons installations constructed by the French around the Red River Delta in northern Vietnam.

The French established the fortification to guard the essential lines of communication between the cities of Hanoi and Haiphong and to provide security for the densely populated and economically important Delta area against attacks by both the Việt Minh and any potential invasion from Communist China.

The Line was to comprise 1200 separate concrete blockhouses able to withstand 155mm artillery grouped in 250 clusters of 3-6 blockhouses for mutual fire support over a span of 235 miles (378 km). Each blockhouse was to hold a minimum of 10 men. In addition a defensive redoubt was to be constructed around a 22 miles (35 km) radius from the port of Haiphong ensuring its safety from artillery attack. All these new defensive lines were to be connected by roads capable of bearing 30-ton tanks. Construction commenced in late 1950 and was largely complete by the end of 1951.

While the De Lattre Line provided some degree of security and formed an anchor point for French mobile operations outside the Delta, it was far from impenetrable and entire Việt Minh combat units could be easily infiltrated through the gaps between strongpoints. Following the withdrawal of the French from northern Vietnam in October 1954 the De Lattre Line was abandoned. Today the deteriorating blockhouses are either unused or used by farmers.

== See also ==
- Maginot Line
- McNamara Line
