= Raoul Salan =

French general, founder of OAS (1899–1984)

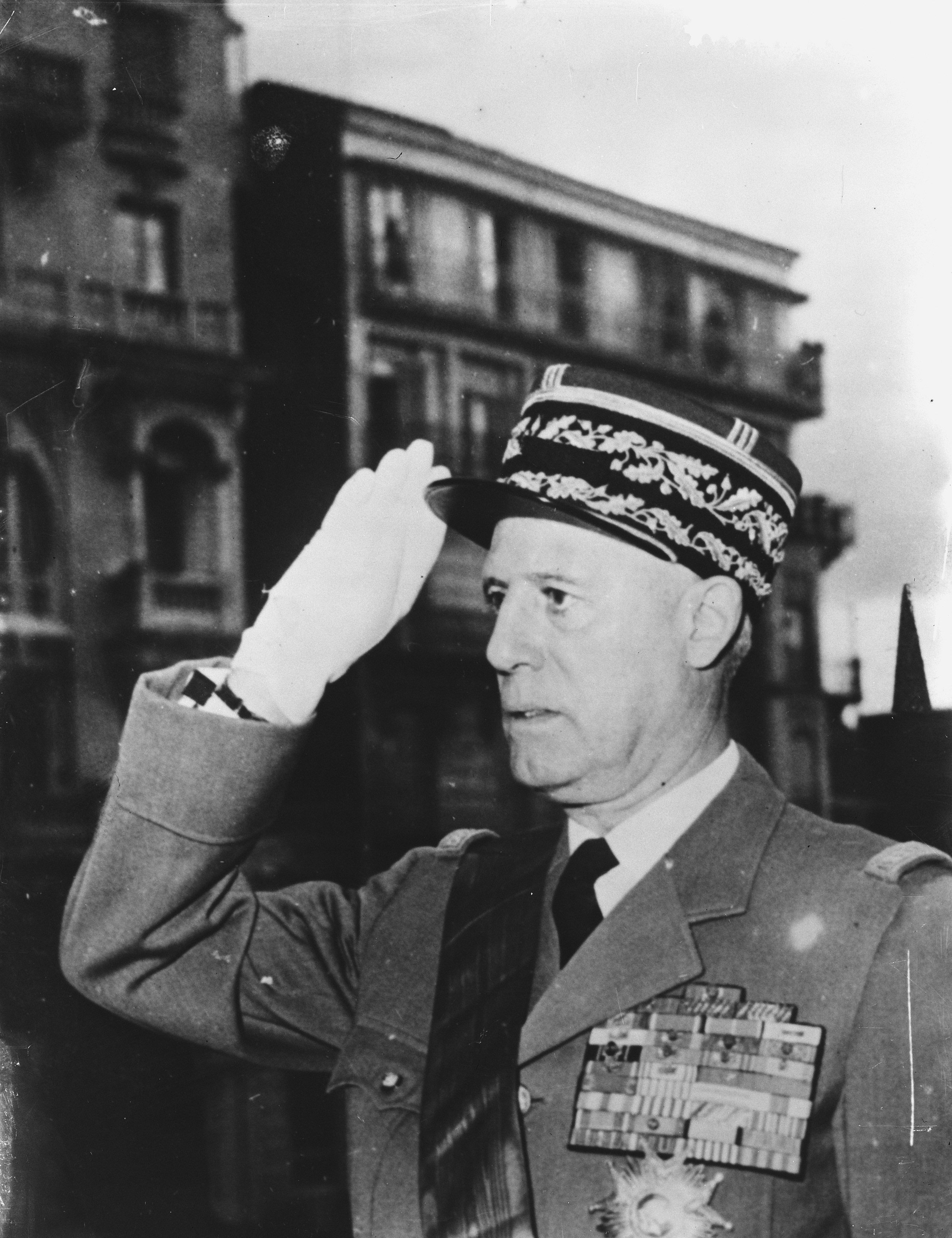
- Salan in 1958
- Born: Raoul Albin Louis Salan; 10 June 1899; Roquecourbe, France
- Died: 3 July 1984 (aged 85); Paris, France
- Military career
- Allegiance: France; Vichy France; Free France; Organisation armée secrète
- Branch: French Army
- Service years: 1917–1959
- Rank: Général d'Armée
- Commands: 6th Senegalese Tirailleur Regiment; 14th Infantry Division; French Far East Expeditionary Corps; French forces in Algeria
- Conflicts: World War I; World War II; First Indochina War; Algerian War; Algiers putsch of 1961
- Awards: Grand Cross of the Legion of Honor
- Other work: Leader of the OAS

Signature
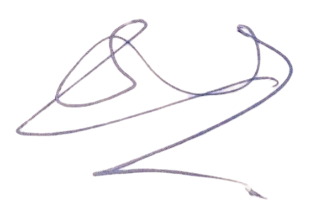

Raoul Albin Louis Salan (French pronunciation: [ʁaul salɑ̃]; 10 June 1899 – 3 July 1984) was a French Army general and the founder of the Organisation armée secrète, a clandestine terrorist organisation that sought to maintain French Algeria by preventing Algerian independence. He served as the fourth French commanding general during the First Indochina War. He was one of four retired generals who organized the 1961 Algiers putsch operation. He was the most decorated soldier in the French Army at the end of his military career.

== World War I ==
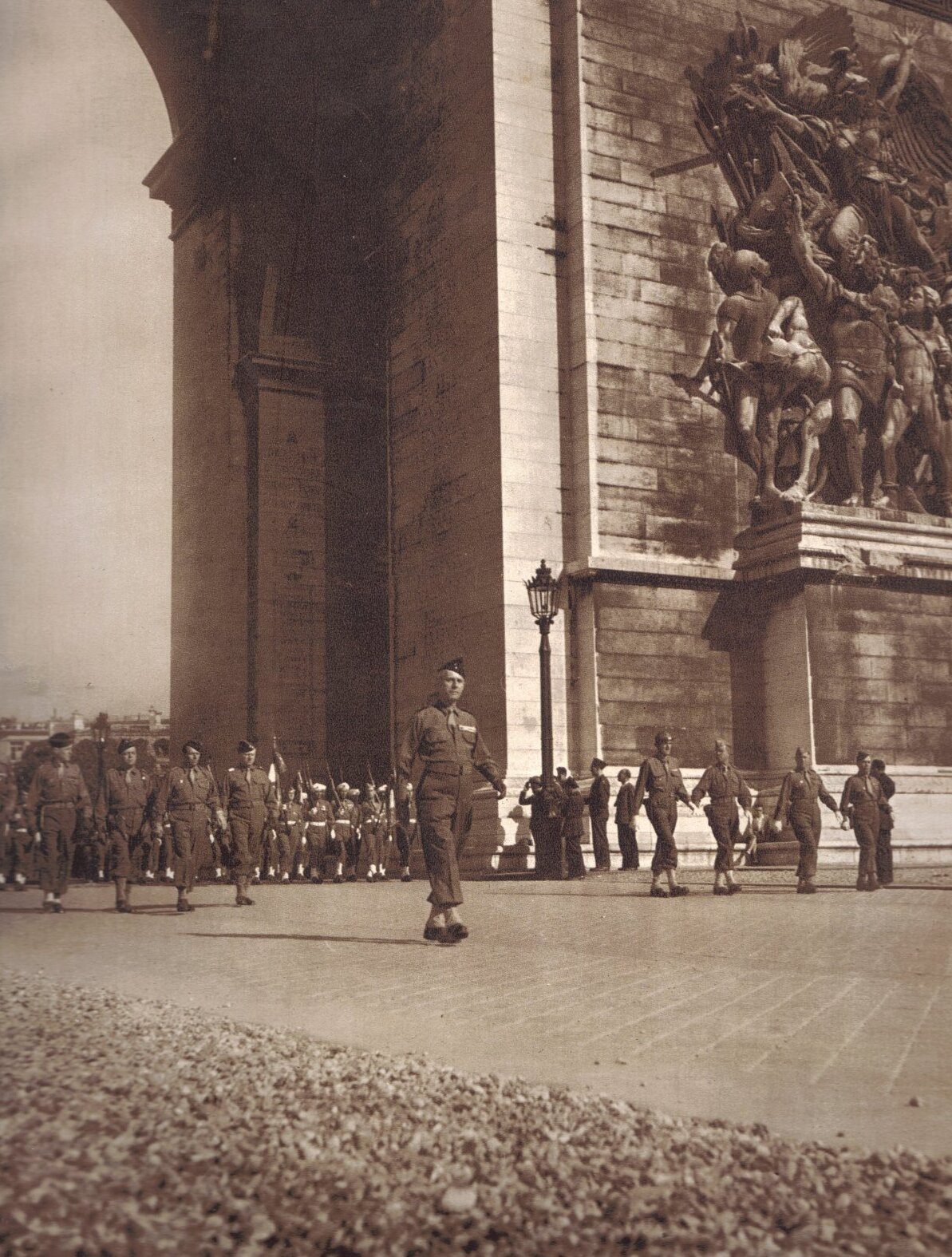
Salan parading on the Champs-Élysées at the head of the 14th Infantry Division, 18 June 1945.

Salan was born on 10 June 1899 in Roquecourbe, Tarn. Enlisted in the French Army for the duration of the war on 2 August 1917, he was accepted in the École spéciale militaire de Saint-Cyr on 21 August 1917, being assigned to the cadet student platoon of the 16th Infantry Regiment stationed at Montbrison, as part of the promotion "de Saint-Odile et de La Fayette" (1917–1918). Salan graduated as an aspirant on 25 July 1918, and was assigned to the 5th Colonial Infantry Regiment (5^{e} RIC) in Lyon on 14 August 1918.

As a platoon leader in the 5^{e} RIC's 11th Company, he took part in the fighting in the Verdun region (Saint-Mihiel, Les Éparges, Fort de Bois-Bourru, Côte de Oie, Cumières-le-Mort-Homme). He was mentioned in the Order of the Brigade by Order dated 29 December 1918.

== World War II ==
Until France's surrender in World War II, Colonel Salan commanded a battalion of Senegalese troops of the 44th Colonial Infantry Regiment. He initially sided with the Vichy Government, but defected to the Allies in December 1942, following the occupation of Vichy France in Case Anton. Between the World Wars he was attached in various capacities to the Ministry of Colonies, and in 1941–43 he served with the Free French forces in French West Africa. After participating in the Allied invasion of France in 1944, he went to Indochina in 1945 and was commander in chief there during 1952–53.

== Indochina and Algeria ==
Salan served as the commander of French forces in Vietnam from 1945 to 1947. By 1948, he was commander of all French land forces in East Asia, and after the death of Jean de Lattre de Tassigny in 1952, Salan became the commander-in-chief in Indochina.

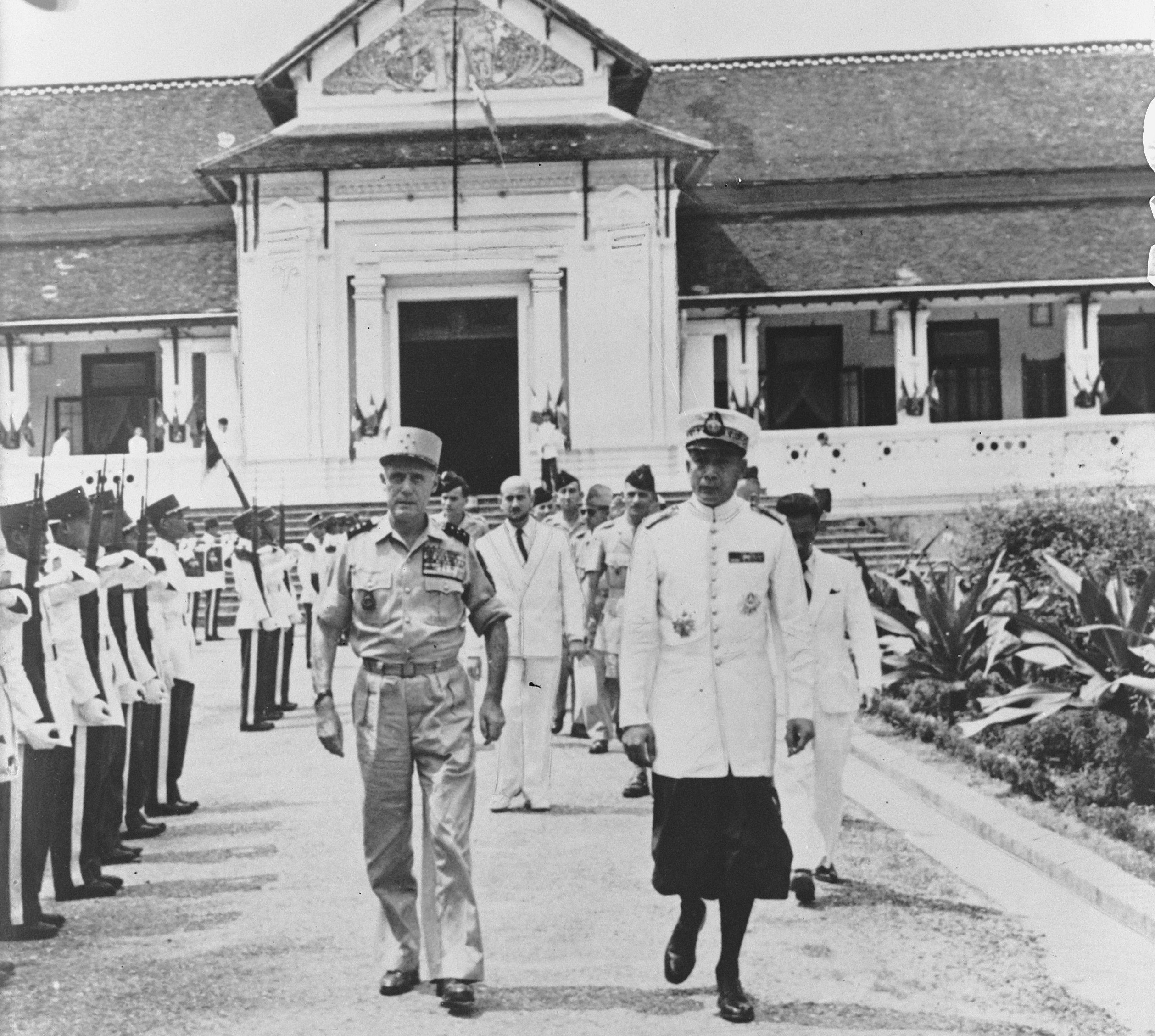
Salan and Sisavang Vatthana inspecting an Laotian Royal Guard honor guard outside the Royal Palace in Luang Prabang, 4 May 1953

Salan served as commander-in-chief of French forces in French Algeria in 1956. In 1958, he established special military internment centers for PAM rebels. The Minister of Interior declared a state of emergency, while the army engaged in a "struggle against the terrorism" of the FLN. Special powers were devolved to the military and were returned to civilian powers only in September 1959, when Charles de Gaulle made his speech on self-determination. General Salan refused to apply the Geneva Conventions ratified by France in 1951 because the detainees were not POWs. The civil authorities had different attitudes concerning the use of torture by the military.

In 1958, Salan called for the return to power of Charles De Gaulle, believing that the latter would protect French Algeria. He retired shortly after, first moving to Spain, then to mainland France. He was banned from entering Algeria in 1960.

Nevertheless, Salan returned to Algeria to organize the putsch on 21 April 1961 with André Zeller, Edmond Jouhaud and Maurice Challe. After the failure of the putsch, he became the chief of Organisation armée secrète (OAS), which attempted to disrupt the March 1962 Evian Accords. Salan was sentenced to death in absentia and arrested in April 1962. He was tried for treason and sentenced to life in prison. Salan was pardoned and released from prison in June 1968. He was amnestied by the French parliament and re-instated to the rank of general in 1982.

== Death ==
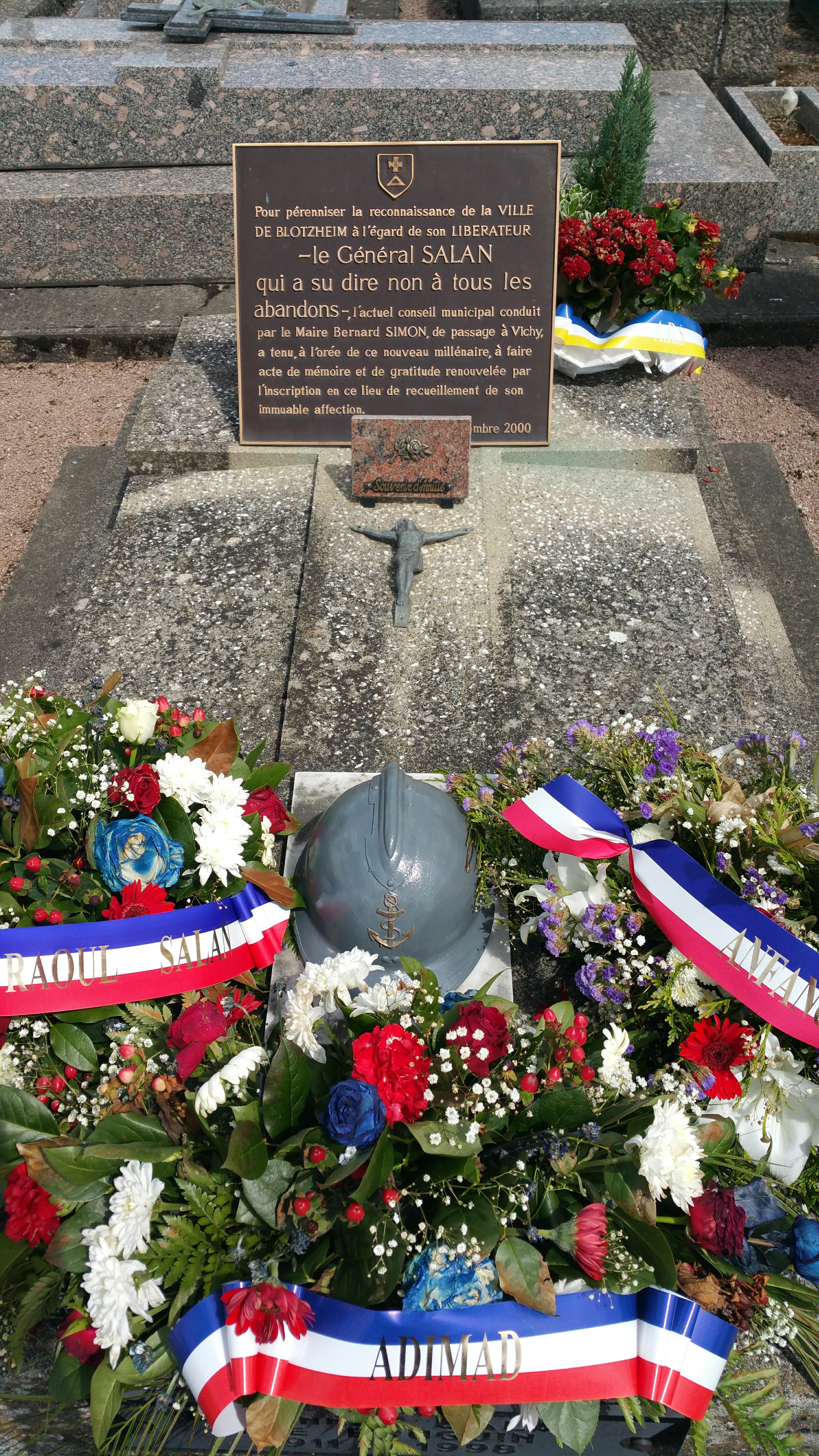
Salan's grave

Salan died on 3 July 1984. Every year, former members of the OAS bring flowers to his tomb on his death anniversary.

== Decorations ==
Salan was the most decorated soldier in the French Army.

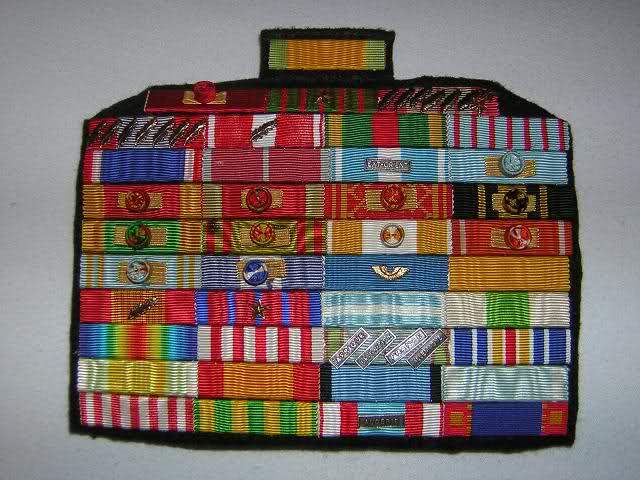
Ribbon bar featuring all decorations received by Salan

French and Colonial Decorations

- Legion of Honour
  - Knight (5 April 1922)
  - Officer (21 August 1940)
  - Commander (10 February 1945)
  - Grand Officer (27 October 1948)
  - Grand Cross (28 August 1952)
- Médaille militaire (12 July 1958)
- Croix de guerre 1914–1918 (1 citation)
- Croix de Guerre 1939–1945 (8 citations)
- Croix de guerre des théâtres d'opérations extérieures (7 citations)
- Cross for Military Valour (1 citation)
- Volunteer Combatant's Cross 1914–1918
- Combatant's Cross
- Colonial Medal (Far East clasp)
- Grand Cross of the Order of the Black Star
- (with GC rosette) Grand Cordon of the Order of the Dragon of Annam with Military and Civil title
- Officer and (later) Grand Cross of the Royal Order of Cambodia
- Grand Cross of the Order of the Million Elephants and the White Parasol
- Grand Cross of the Tai Order of Civil Merit (Sip Song Chau Tai)
- Grand Cross of the Order of Glory
- Grand Cordon of the Order of Ouissam Alaouite
- Grand Cross of the Order of the Star of Anjouan
- Grand Cross of the Étoile des Comores
- Royal Order of Monisaraphon
- Gallantry Cross, with palm
- National Defense Medal (Cambodia)
- Syria-Cilicia commemorative medal
- Order of Civil Merit of the Syrian Arab Republic
- 1914–1918 Inter-Allied Victory medal
- 1914–1918 Commemorative war medal
- 1939–1945 Commemorative war medal with "Africa", "Italy", "France", and "Germany" clasps
- Aeronautical Medal
- Medal for the War Wounded
- Annam Order of Military Merit
- Order of the Reign of King Savang Vatthana
- 1943–1944 Italian campaign medal
- Indochina Campaign Commemorative Medal
- North Africa Security and Order Operations Commemorative Medal with "Algeria" clasp

Foreign Decorations

- Distinguished Service Cross (US)
- Commander of the Order of the British Empire (CBE) (UK)
- Vietnam Campaign Medal (Thailand)
- Sena Jayaseddh Medal (Cambodia)

== Bibliography ==
- Mémoires Fin d'un empire (4 volumes), Editions Presses de la Cité, 1970–74
  - Le sens d'un engagement, 1970
  - Le Viêt-minh mon adversaire, 1971
  - Algérie française, 1972
  - L'Algérie, de Gaulle et moi, 1974
