= French senators elected by the National Assembly =

French senators elected by the National Assembly held office during the French Fourth Republic.

The senators were:

- André Armengaud
- Antoine Avinin
- Jean-Richard Bloch
- Émile Bollaert
- Alice Brisset
- Gilberte Brossolette
- Alexandre Caspary
- Auguste Champetier de Ribes
- Joseph Chatagner
- André Debray
- Jules Decaux
- Pierre Delfortrie
- Marcel Renet
- Marcelle Devaud
- Juliette Dubois
- Yvonne Dumont
- Charles Flory
- Étienne Gilson
- Salomon Grumbach
- Amédée Guy
- Jules Hyvrard
- Aziz Kessous
- Xavier Knecht
- Emmanuel la Graviere
- Bernard Lafay
- Georges Laffargue
- Marie-Hélène Lefaucheux
- René Mammonat
- Faustin Merle
- Geoffroy de Montalembert
- Léon Nicod
- Abdelmadjid Ou Rabah
- Marie Oyon
- André Pairault
- Joseph Paul-Boncour
- Ernest Petit
- Ernest Pezet
- René Poirot
- Jean Primet
- Alex Roubert
- Claire Saunier
- Robert Serot
- Paul Simon
- Pierre Tremintin
- Paul Tubert
- Christian Vieljeux
- Marcel Willard

== Sources ==
- Liste des anciens sénateurs de la IVème République par circonscription (in French), Sénat de France
