= Vương Thừa Vũ =

WWII Vietnamese lieutenant-general

Lieutenant General Vương Thừa Vũ
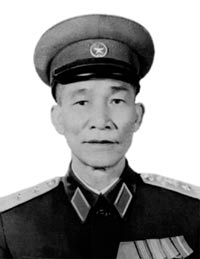

Deputy Chief of the PAVN General Staff
- In office 1964–1980

Commander of Military Region 4
- In office 1964–1971
- Preceded by: Đàm Quang Trung
- Succeeded by: Đàm Quang Trung

Commander of Military Region 3
- In office 1955–1963

Personal details
- Born: Nguyễn Văn Đồi; December 21, 1910 Vinh Ninh, Thuong Tin District, Hanoi, French Indochina
- Died: September 10, 1980 (aged 69) Hanoi, Vietnam
- Party: Communist Party of Vietnam
- Children: 6
- Education: Whampoa Military Academy

Military service
- Allegiance: (Taiwan) Kuomintang China (1930s); Democratic Republic of Vietnam and later Vietnam
- Branch/service: National Revolutionary Army People's Army of Vietnam
- Years of service: 1945–1980
- Rank: Lieutenant General
- Battles/wars: World War II; Second Sino-Japanese War; Japanese invasion of Manchuria; War in Vietnam (1945–1946); First Indochina War; Battle of Hanoi (1946); Battle of Vĩnh Yên; Battle of Mạo Khê; Battle of the Day River; Battle of Dien Bien Phu; Vietnam War; Tet Offensive; Easter Offensive; 1975 spring offensive
- Awards: Ho Chi Minh Order; Military Exploit Order (2); Fatherland Defense Order; Feat Order; Resolution for Victory Order

Vương Thừa Vũ (born Nguyễn Văn Đồi) (1910-1980) was a lieutenant-general in the People's Army of Vietnam active during World War II, the First Indochina War, and the Vietnam War. He commanded Viet Minh forces in their early engagements at Hanoi in 1946, directing the city's two month-long defence against French forces. By 1949, during the Viet Minh's transition from guerrilla to regular warfare, he had risen to command the PAVN's first modern infantry division, the 308th, which he led into battle at Dien Bien Phu in 1954.

Owing to his unique experience fighting in the Second Sino-Japanese War, he was well-versed in Chinese language and military doctrine. Hence, he became part of a small nucleus of Chinese-trained officers (Vũ, Nguyễn Sơn, and Lê Thiết Hùng) relied upon by General Giáp and other leaders early in the First Indochina war for their expertise, while due to his connections, he was active in liaising with the People's Republic of China for support.

During the Vietnam War, he rose to command Military Region 4 alongside the PAVN Military Academy, and became deputy chief of the General Staff.

== Early career ==
His military service had an unusual beginning. He served in Chiang Kai-shek's army, where he fought against the Japanese invasion of Manchuria in 1931. This was followed by a stint at the Whampoa Military Academy, where he was one of few Vietnamese students there. Its notable alumni included Nguyễn Sơn, who later became a general in both the PLA and PAVN.

Upon returning to Vietnam in 1941, he was imprisoned by colonial authorities and converted to communism in 1943 during confinement. After the 1945 Japanese coup d'état overthrew the French government, he escaped from Nghĩa Lộ prison and was detained by rural villagers at Pa Hu, who mistook him for a French agent. Vũ narrowly avoided execution due to recognising the local language, promptly discovering that the villagers all carried the surname Vương. By claiming to have the same surname, he was spared and taken in by them, later adopting the name Vương Thừa Vũ as his revolutionary nom-de-guerre.

After the August Revolution that year, he took up service with the Viet Minh as the commander of their security forces in Hanoi. He was dispatched to Sơn Tây for training sometime afterwards, but was abruptly recalled to Hanoi in October the following year when the DRV's relationship with France reached breaking point.

== First Indochina War ==
=== Hanoi, 1946 ===
As relations between the Democratic Republic of Vietnam (DRV) and France continued deteriorating in 1946, conflict grew increasingly likely, culminating in the Hai Phong incident. Anticipating further attacks by French forces, who had a 6,000-strong presence in Hanoi, the Viet Minh leadership appointed Vũ and approved his plan to defend the city.

Soldiers were posted at government buildings, industrial plants, and major thoroughfares of strategic significance. Arms and supplies were stashed in the city, and wall openings secretly made between houses to allow rapid, maze-like movement from street to street. Furniture was strewn across city streets as makeshift barricades in open view of French forces, and at night on December 19, 1946, some 2,000-10,000 Viet Minh engaged in their first instances of urban warfare, the heaviest fighting occurring in Hanoi's Old Quarter. The Viet Minh's failure to sabotage the Paul Doumer Bridge nor the military airbase at Gia Lam allowed the French to immediately rush in troops, supplies, and arms into Hanoi, achieving firepower superiority. From then on, the French slowly recaptured Hanoi from its poorly-armed defenders in a battle marred by civilian massacres and torture committed by both factions, and the Old Quarter was levelled to rubble by airstrikes and artillery.

By February, after heavy losses of several hundred dead, Vũ withdrew his Capital Regiment, now reduced to 1,000 fighters, having delayed the French advance longer than expected. His defence allowed the DRV government to evacuate in an orderly manner, taking with them machinery, medical equipment, printing presses, and even the Voice of Vietnam transmitters into the countryside.

He was reassigned to Military Zone 4 afterwards in Bình Trị Thiên, Central Vietnam, serving in subsequent turn under the other two Chinese-trained generals, Hùng and Sơn.

=== The 308th Division ===
On August 28, 1949, the Viet Minh formed its first regular, modern infantry battalion (later division) in Thai Nguyen province, the 308th Infantry Division. In light of the People's Liberation Army's rapid victories in China and the ongoing stalemate, the Vietnamese leaders realised they needed to professionalise and reorganise their military in order to wage war using modern weaponry that would arrive when the PLA reached the Vietnamese border. The unexpected PLA successes meant that the PAVN could now transition from guerrilla tactics to modern, conventional warfare in line with Mao's "General Counteroffensive" principles. They expanded their General Staff, recruiting more logistics, intelligence, and instruction personnel, and built a sophisticated officer corps trained to fight pitched, coordinated battles. They devised a new framework for infantry units, including large divisions numbering 10,000 to 15,000 men, and appointed the distinguished Vũ as commander.

His division was soon involved in a series of major engagements. They fought against General Tassigny's forces in several abortive attempts to penetrate the Red River Delta, starting at Vĩnh Yên in January 1951, where initial success in half-destroying Group Mobile 3 was trounced by heavy French firepower during their counterattack, causing heavy losses. Firepower and the determined resistance of French troops again defeated the 308th and its sister divisions (the 312th and 316th) at Mạo Khê in March and the Day River in May–June, with human wave attacks failing to dislodge the French.

After initially poor outcomes, his division achieved multiple victories in the following years: in 1952 they overran an outpost at Nghia Lo in just one hour, then fended off Operation Lorraine, ambushing retreating convoys to inflict high French losses. In 1953, they expanded Viet Minh presence into Laos, controlling territory in the Plain of Jars and encircling a French airbase to block the approach to Vientiane, then securing and expanding Route Provinciale 41, which later became the main Viet Minh supply route into Dien Bien Phu.

==== Dien Bien Phu ====
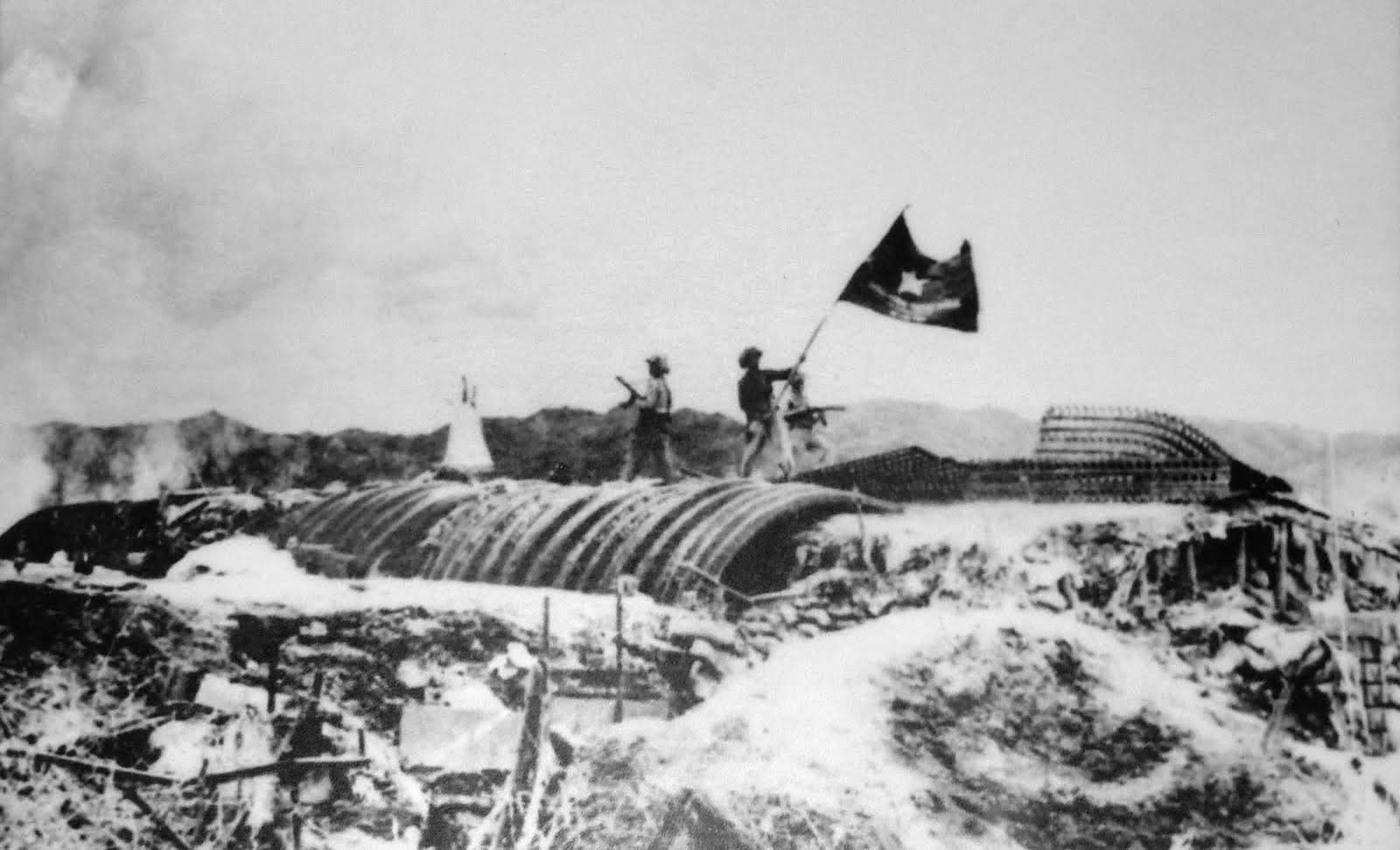
Viet Minh soldiers standing atop the command bunker seized by the 308th

Vũ led his men into battle at Điện Biên Phủ, where they played a leading role. His regiments stormed strongpoint Gabrielle on March 14–15, rapidly overrunning the command post and holding off French counterattacks until the latter abandoned the strongpoint late on the 15th. A couple of weeks later on March 28–31, they took part in the battle for five hills east of Dien Bien Phu, but failed to take Eliane 2 while Huguette 7 was recaptured by the defenders, after which Giap ordered all divisions to dig in around the remaining French forces.

In late April, they resumed the offensive with success, overrunning Huguette 1 to establish control over most of the airfield, and over the following weeks fought fierce battles to take Huguette 5 and Claudine 5 on May 6/7. When the French ceased resistance early on May 7, it was Vũ's 308th who captured the command bunker, and with it, General de Castries.

==== Return to Hanoi ====
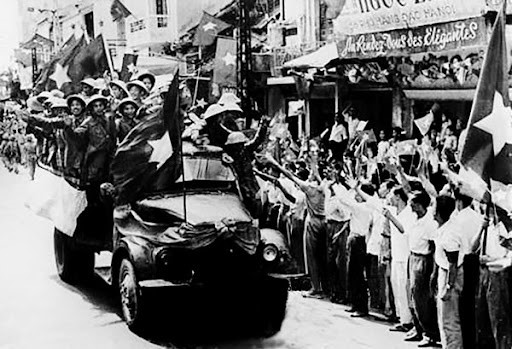
Viet Minh troops on parade at Hanoi

After the Geneva Conference, his men returned to Hanoi on October 9, 1954, being the first Viet Minh division to re-enter the city. The local residents celebrated the soldiers' return, with a parade being held at Hang Dao street on the 10th while Vũ was photographed receiving flowers from students attending a local girls' school. He oversaw the DRV's flag-raising ceremony at the Flag Tower of Hanoi after his men had liberated the city, and established the Hanoi Military Commission at the Hanoi Opera House that same day.

== Vietnam War ==
After the First Indochina War, Vũ commanded Military Region 3 until being appointed PAVN Deputy Chief of the General Staff in 1964, a post he held until death in 1980. He also commanded the same Military Region 4 he had served in during the late-1940s from 1964 to 1971, and simultaneously directed the PAVN Military Academy, becoming a lieutenant general in 1974. During his period on the General Staff, he was involved in planning major campaigns finishing with the 1975 Spring Offensive, while his tenure in Region 4 witnessed major battles during the Tet Offensive in Quang Tri, Khe Sanh, and Hue.

Out of his six children, three sons served in the war. One later retired as an army colonel, while two others - one born while he was exiled in China, the other an air force pilot - died in action. For his service, he received a host of medals, including the Ho Chi Minh Order, Exploit Order, and various victory medals.
