= 1st Military Region (People's Army of Vietnam) =

Military region of the People's Army of Vietnam

Quân khu 1 (1st Military Region)
- Active: 16 October 1945 – present
- Country: North Vietnam; Vietnam
- Allegiance: People's Army of Vietnam
- Branch: Active duty
- Role: Regular force
- Size: Equivalent to Corps
- Part of: People's Army of Vietnam
- Garrison/HQ: Thái Nguyên
- Mottos: Trung hiếu, Tiên phong, Đoàn kết, Chiến thắng (Loyal, Pioneer, Solidarity, Victory)
- Engagements: First Indochina War; Vietnam War; Sino-Vietnamese War
- Decorations: Gold Star Order

Commanders
- Current commander: Major General Trần Xuân Mạnh
- Political commissar: Lieutenant General La Công Phương

1st Military Region of Vietnam People's Army, founded in 1945, is directly under the Ministry of Defence of Vietnam, tasked with the organisation, management and oversight of combat against foreign intrusion in Northeast Vietnam. Their headquarters are located in Thái Nguyên.

province.

== Agencies ==
- Department of Staff
  - 15th Guard Battalion
  - 31st Reconnaissance Battalion
  - 13rd Artillery Command Battalion
  - 20th Commando Battalion
  - Unmanned Vehicle Battalion
  - 97th Electronic Warfare Battalion
  - 23rd Chemical Defense Battalion (Zil-131 ARS-14)
- Department of Politics
  - Branch of Cadre
  - Branch of Organisation
  - Branch of Propaganda and Training
  - Branch of Thought and Culture
  - Branch of Policy
  - Military Court of Military Zone
  - Military Procuracy of Military Zone
  - Inspection Commission of the Party
- Department of Logistics - Technical
  - 651st Transportation Regiment
  - K21 Warehouse
  - K23 Warehouse
  - K56 Warehouse
  - K80 Warehouse
  - K818 Warehouse
  - H8 Fuel Warehouse
  - X79 Workshop
  - 91st Military Hospital
  - 110th Military Hospital
- 1st Military Region Military School
- Northern Region Cadet Military School
- National Shooting Range 1st Region
  - 2nd Artillery Training Battalion

== Subordinate units ==
- Military Command of Lạng Sơn Province
  - Border Guard Command of Lạng Sơn
  - 1st Infantry Regiment
  - 2nd Infantry Regiment
  - 123rd Infantry Regiment
  - Mechanized Reconnaissance Company (BTR-152, BRDM-2)
  - 29th Warehouse Company
- Military Command of Cao Bằng Province
  - Border Guard Command of Cao Bằng
  - 3rd Infantry Regiment
  - 4th Infantry Regiment
  - 852nd Infantry Regiment
  - Mechanized Reconnaissance Company (BTR-152)
  - 577th Construction Engineer Company
  - Cao Bằng Military Command Provincial Clinic
  - K15 Warehouse
- Military Command of Thái Nguyên Province
  - 5th Infantry Regiment
  - 750th Infantry Regiment
  - 832nd Infantry Regiment
  - 2 Mechanized Reconnaissance Companies (BTR-152)
  - Guard - Military Police Platoon
  - Signal Company
  - Engineer Company
  - 29th Storage Company
- Military Command of Bắc Ninh Province
  - 6th Infantry Regiment
  - 831st Infantry Regiment
  - 833rd Infantry Regiment
  - 2 Mechanized Reconnaissance Companies (BTR-152, BRDM-2)
  - Guard - Military Police Platoon
  - Signal Company
  - Engineer Company
- 3rd Division
  - 2nd Infantry Regiment
  - 12th Infantry Regiment
  - 141st Infantry Regiment
  - 15th Anti-tank Battalion (SPG-9)
  - 16th Air Defense Battalion
- 306th Division
  - 111th Infantry Regiment
  - 421st Infantry Regiment
  - 422nd Infantry Regiment
- 346th Division
  - 246th Infantry Regiment
  - 567th Infantry Regiment
  - 677th Infantry Regiment
- 409th Tank Brigade
  - 1st Tank Battalion (T-54M)
  - 2nd Tank Battalion (T-54/T-55)
  - 3rd Armored Battalion (BMP-1)
  - 12th Reconnaissance Company (BRDM-2)
- 382nd Artillery Brigade
  - 1st Artillery Battalion (D-20 howitzer)
  - 2nd Artillery Battalion (D-30 howitzer)
  - 3rd Artillery Battalion (BM-21 MLRS)
- 210th Air Defense Brigade
  - 1st Air Defense Battalion (AZP S-60)
  - 2nd Air Defense Battalion (Strela-2)
  - 3rd Air Defense Battalion (Type 65 anti-aircraft guns)
- 601st Signals Brigade
  - 1st Signals Battalion (radio communication and mail)
  - 2nd Signals Battalion (wired communication)
  - 3nd Signals Battalion (specialized signal vehicle & SATCOM)
- 575th Engineer Brigade
  - 1st Engineer Battalion
  - 2nd Engineer Battalion
  - 3rd Engineer Battalion
  - 4th Engineer Battalion
  - 5th River Crossing Battalion (PMP, PTS, GSP-55)
- 338th Economic - Defense Group
- 799th Economic - Defense Group (Bảo Lâm District, Cao Bằng)

=== Independent units ===
- 204th MLRS Brigade of Artillery - Missile Command (Bắc Ninh Province)
  - 1st Artillery Battalion (BM-21 MLRS)
  - 2nd Artillery Battalion (BM-21 MLRS)
  - 3rd Artillery Battalion (BM-21 MLRS)
- 229th Engineer Brigade of Engineering Arms (IMR-2, PZM-2, TMM-3M bridgelayer) (Bắc Ninh Province)
  - 1st Engineer Battalion (Structural)
  - 2nd Engineer Battalion (Headquarters, emplacement and rescue)
  - 3rd Engineer Battalion (Road, Bridge and camouflage)

== Successive Commander and Leadership ==
=== Commander ===
- Major General Chu Văn Tấn (1954 - 1956)
- Major General Lê Quảng Ba (1957 - 1959)
- Senior Colonel Thanh Phong (1959 – 1961)
- Senior Colonel Đàm Quang Trung (1961 – 1966)
- Lieutenant General Bằng Giang (1966 - 1975)
- Colonel General Đàm Quang Trung (1976 – 1986)
- Lieutenant General Đàm Văn Ngụy (1987 – 1997)
- Lieutenant General Phùng Quang Thanh (1997 – 2001)
- Lieutenant General Nguyễn Khắc Nghiên (2001 – 2002)
- Lieutenant General Phạm Xuân Thệ (2002 – 2007):
- Lieutenant General Nguyễn Văn Đạo (2007 - 2010)
- Lieutenant General Bế Xuân Trường (2010 – 2014)
- Lieutenant General Phan Văn Giang (2014 – 2016)
- Major General Ngô Minh Tiến (2016 – 2018)
- Lieutenant General Trần Hồng Minh (2018 – 2019)
- Lieutenant General Nguyễn Hồng Thái (2019 – 2025)
- Lieutenant General Trương Mạnh Dũng (2025 – 2026)
- Major General Trần Xuân Mạnh (2026 – present)

=== The Commissioner, Deputy Commander of Politics ===
- Major General (1974) Đàm Quang Trung (July 1976 – 1980):
- Major General Đàm Đình Trại ( –2004)
- Lieutenant General Vi Văn Mạn (2004–2011)
- Lieutenant General Nguyễn Sỹ Thăng (2011–2018)
- Lieutenant General Dương Đình Thông (2018–2024)
- Major General La Công Phương (2024–present)
