= Battle of Hanoi (1946) =

First battle in the First Indochina War

- Part of the First Indochina War
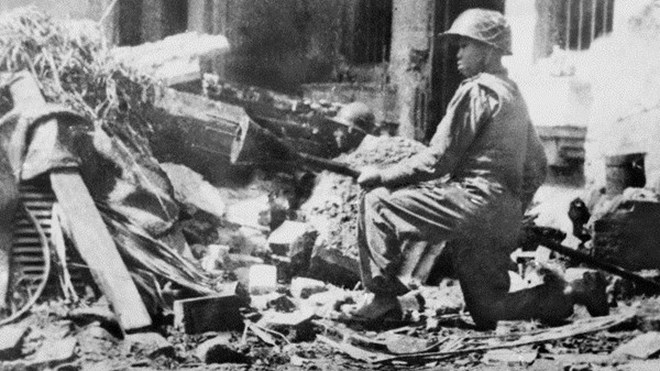
- Viet Minh soldier Nguyen Van Thieng holding a lunge mine at Hàng Đậu Street in December 1946
| Date | 19 December 1946 – 18 February 1947 |
| Location | Hanoi, Tonkin, French Indochina 21°02′N 105°51′E |
| Result | Beginning of the First Indochina War; Viet Minh forces withdrawal to Việt Bắc |
| Territorial changes | French capture of Hanoi |

Belligerents
| French Union: France; French Indochina | Democratic Republic of Vietnam: (North Vietnam) Việt Minh |

Commanders and leaders
| Louis Morlière; Pierre-Louis Débes | Vương Thừa Vũ; Trần Độ |

Units involved
| French Far East Expeditionary Corps | Hanoi Youth Militia Corps; Suburban People's Armed Militia; Capital Regiment |

Strength
| 6,000 men | 10,000 militia, 2,500-3,000 regulars |

Casualties and losses
| 160 soldiers and 100 civilians killed 230 civilians missing | Several hundred killed |
- Location within Vietnam

On December 19, 1946, Viet Minh soldiers detonated explosives in Hanoi, and the ensuing battle, known as the Battle of Hanoi marked the opening salvo of the First Indochina War.

== Background ==
According to the preliminary treaty on 6 March 1946, the Vietnamese army was under French control. On 15 September 1946 (de jure 14 September), France and the DRV had signed a modus vivendi, promising reciprocal rights and negotiations to end armed hostilities. The French did not follow through with any political concessions. Instead, France landed reinforcements at Da Nang in violation of an accord signed on March 6, 1946. Then in November 1946, local disputes led to colonialist massacres at Haiphong, Langson and Tourane.

The French had balked at granting the DRV independence, instead insisting on rebuilding their Indochinese Federation with a new form; the Cochinchina issue was also stalled. The Viet Minh also did not want to give in to French colonial demands. Already in mid-October that year, the Viet Minh's General Staff concluded that the French would attack and hence preparations were necessary. This became more apparent with at Hai Phong, where a sovereignty dispute over the right to collect customs duties saw Georges Bidault green-light a violent military resolution. In the aftermath of it, French attention shifted towards Hanoi, where they maintained a shared presence with the DRV through joint military commissions. Their military presence in Hanoi numbered some 6,000 men while the DRV had 10,000 militia and 2,500–3,000 regulars on active duty.

== Prelude ==
A showdown was imminent. After Hai Phong, Franco-Vietnamese soldiers of the joint military commissions engaged in increasing levels of violence towards each other; their mutual confidence sinking to new lows.

The DRV leaders had resolved to fight for Hanoi. It carried significant political capital for both sides, and in the aftermath of French reoccupation, the DRV wanted to show their populace that they were willing to fight. Their strategy did not revolve around holding the capital. Rather, it was to pin down the French while the leadership evacuated to bases in Northern and Central Vietnamese jungles, while the resulting urban battle would attract international attention towards the Vietnamese struggle against colonial conquest.

Having already analysed Soviet tactics at Stalingrad and their southern failures during the War in Vietnam (1945–1946), the General Staff appointed Vương Thừa Vũ to command the city's defence. He was well-versed in military tactics due to prior service in the Kuomintang Army during the Second Sino-Japanese War, and all units in the city now answered to him.

In the lead up to the battle, his soldiers were posted at government buildings, industrial plants, and major thoroughfares of strategic significance. Arms and supplies were stashed in the city, and wall openings secretly made between houses to allow rapid, maze-like movement from street to street. Furniture was strewn across city streets as makeshift barricades in open view of French forces, while snipers of both factions assumed their positions. Vũ's plan was that when the French advances, the militia would fall back to the city's Old Quarter, where they would bog down the French with the aforementioned preparations, while the regular forces would attack Gia Lam Airport to prevent French forces from reinforcing by air.

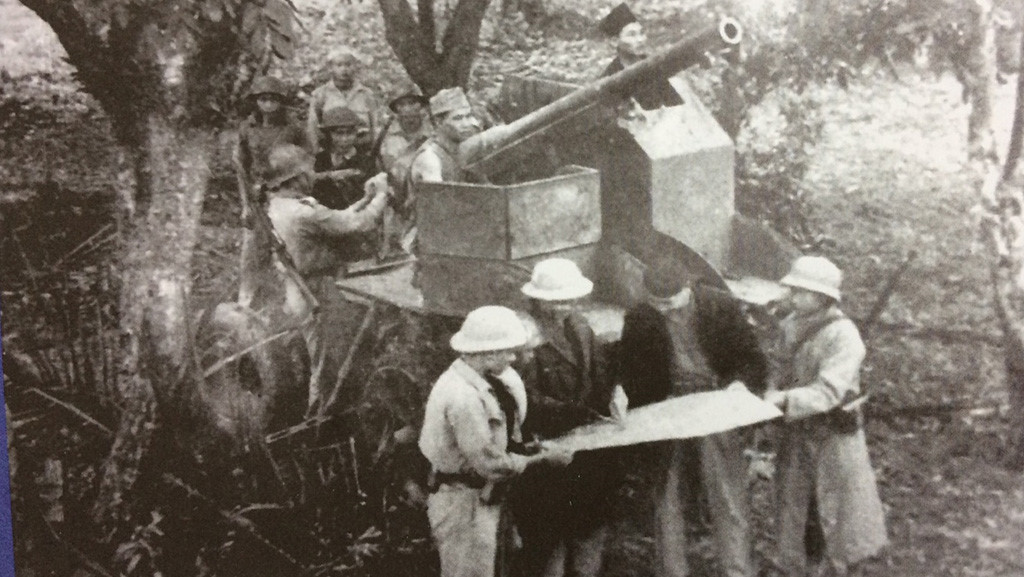
Viet Minh artillery in Hanoi

== Battle ==
Viet Minh set off explosives, at 20:03 in the evening of December 19, 1946, after smuggling them past French Army guards into the city's power plant. The explosion plunged Hanoi into darkness, and throughout the city the Viet-Minh began attacking French military positions and French homes. About 600 French civilians were abducted during this time. Surviving French troops, alerted by friendly spies, gradually gained a numerical superiority. French artillery shelled the city, and house to house searches were conducted searching for the Viet-Minh leadership.

That night, some 2,000–10,000 Viet Minh had engaged in their first instance of urban warfare, the heaviest fighting occurring in Hanoi's Old Quarter. The following day Ho Chi Minh made an appeal to the populace to resist in any form:

"Those who have rifles will use their rifles; those who have swords will use their swords; those who have no swords will use spades, hoes, or sticks. Everyone must endeavour to oppose the French colonialists and save his country!"

Nonetheless, Viet Minh efforts to sabotage the Paul Doumer Bridge and the military airbase at Gia Lam failed; not a single Spitfire sitting on the latter's tarmac was destroyed. This allowed the French to immediately rush in troops, supplies, and arms into Hanoi, achieving firepower superiority. The French Air Force bombed Hanoi with significant effectiveness, dislodging Viet Minh forces whose locations had been exposed by their artillery guns firing. From then on, the French slowly recaptured Hanoi from its poorly armed defenders, starting by seizing the French Quarter and the main administrative buildings such as the Presidential Palace.

By early January 1947, French forces had recaptured most of Hanoi, save for its Old Quarter. An attempt to advance on December 27, 1946 had cost 15 killed and 30 wounded. The fighting there trapped some 20,000 Vietnamese and 10,000 Chinese civilians, yet in defiance of General Valluy's order to "hit them with the cannon and the bomb... to prove to our adversary the overwhelming superiority of our capabilities" Morliere instead blockaded the district, deliberately leaving an outlet for people to escape. This was further added to by the Republic of China's consul in Hanoi, supported by British and American counterparts, brokering a truce on January 15 to evacuate his civilians. In doing so, the city was rapidly depopulated while several Viet Minh units exfiltrated out of the city with the crowd.

The lull in fighting lasted until February 1, when Debes, who had commanded the forces at Hai Phong, took over from Morliere. He deployed APCs, air strikes, artillery bombardments, and bulldozers to force his way into the Old Quarter. The defenders slowly retreating towards the Red River until finally, on February 18, 1947, after heavy losses of several hundred dead, Vũ withdrew his Capital Regiment, now reduced to 1,000 fighters, across the Red River under the Paul Doumer Bridge.

== Aftermath ==
The defence had delayed the French advance longer than expected. Vũ's defence allowed the DRV government to evacuate in an orderly manner, taking with them machinery, medical equipment, printing presses, and even the Voice of Vietnam’s transmitters into the countryside. Pre-battle discussions between Generals Võ Nguyên Giáp, Hoàng Văn Thái, plus party leaders Truong Chinh and Ho Chi Minh, had been pessimistic, expecting to hold on for little more than a few days – compared to their goal of 1 month – due to how poorly trained and equipped their forces were relative to the French. This was not helped by the initial turnout of militias in battle. Of some 10,000 officially enrolled in Hanoi's garrison, only some 2,000, later dwindling into the hundreds, actually participated in its defence; the remainder having been scattered or run away.

Ho Chi Minh was at the time ill with fever, and Võ Nguyên Giáp had ordered "all soldiers... to stand together, go into battle, destroy the invaders, and save the nation". Ultimately however, French superiority in firepower had forced the Viet-Minh to withdraw to the Việt Bắc area which is approximately 80 miles to the north of Hanoi, thus reorganize the government and the National Army of Vietnam forces for the nine-year First Indochina War.

Destruction

The evacuation of the city left it severely depopulated. Out of a population of 40,000 in 1946, only 10,000 were left by 1948–49. Thousands of refugees had streamed out of other major cities when the French had struck, including Hai Phong, Hue, Nam Dinh, and Saigon. The pattern was no different in Hanoi.

Additionally, the historic old town of Hanoi was levelled to rubble: out of some 13,191 houses in the city, 2,837 had been destroyed.

Atrocities

During the battle, atrocities were committed by both sides, with several hundred dead/missing French civilians matched by incidents like at Yen Ninh street, where twenty Vietnamese civilians were as part of retaliatory tit-for-tat attacks by the French. Several Viet Minh POWs were subject to torture by their French-Vietnamese captors in the form of electric shocks to their sensitive regions, acts which later attracted notoriety during the Algerian War.

=== Post-Battle Negotiations ===
After expunging the Viet-Minh from the city, the French demanded the military surrender of their opponents, but the latter refused. The United States, alarmed at the incident, dispatched Abbot Low Moffat on a special mission to Saigon and Hanoi to consider a negotiated referendum. However, the realization that the Viet-Minh would not accept any compromise, and the fact that the US did not want to formally mediate between the two sides, led to the US abandoning the idea.

== Gallery ==
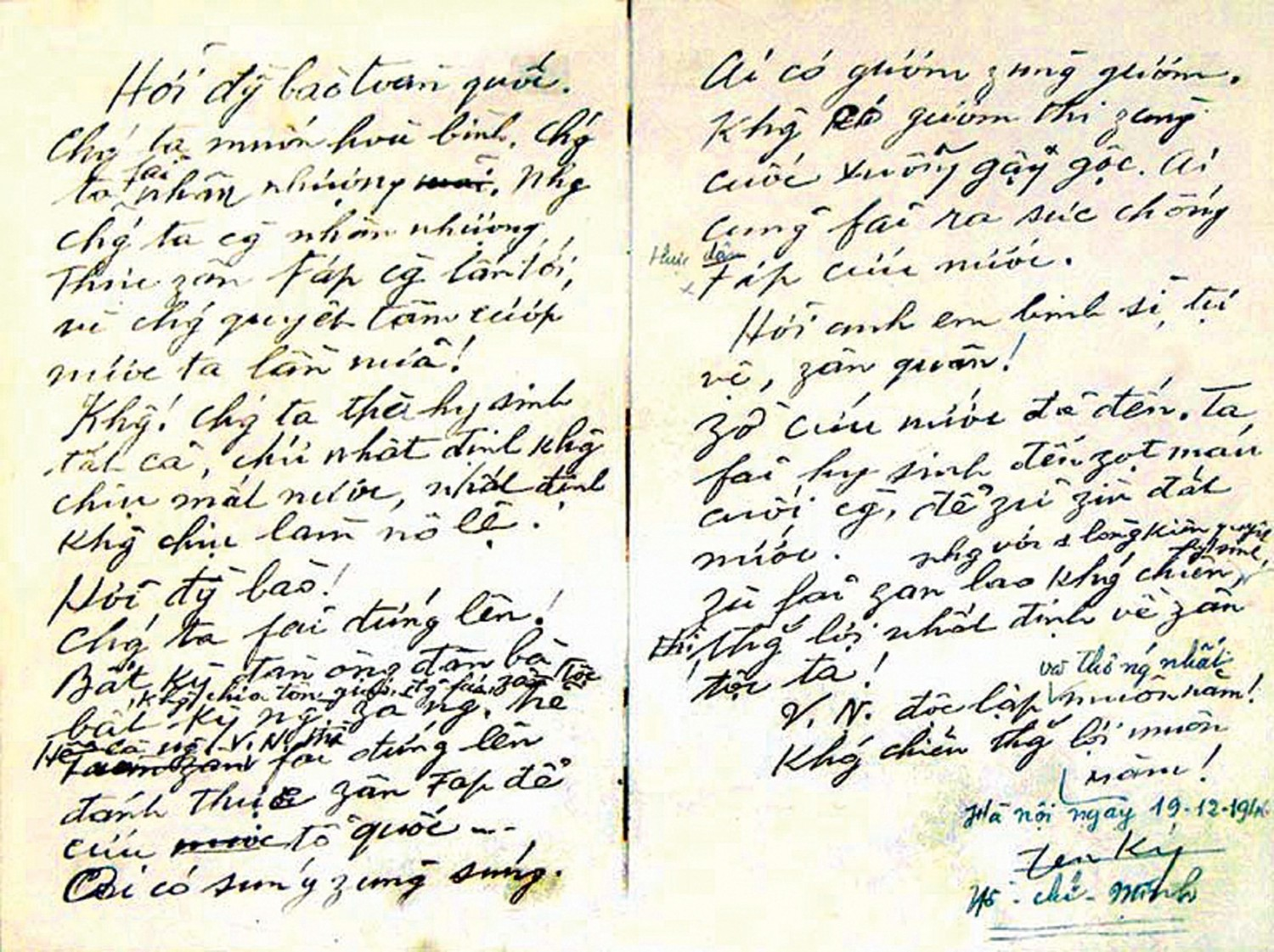
Document "The word of the National Assembly of War Resistance" handwritten by Hồ Chí Minh on December 19, 1946.

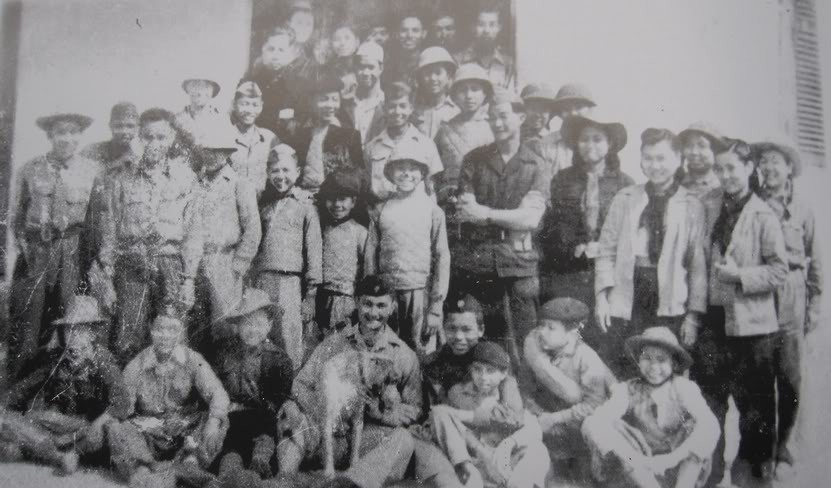
The youngest in the winter of 1946.
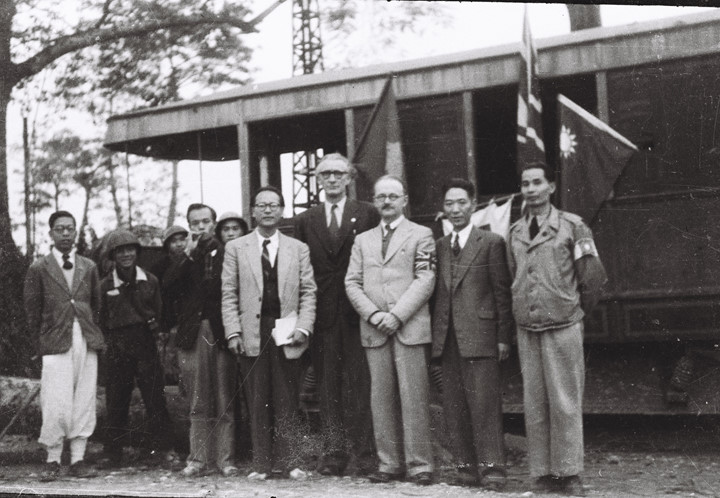
Vietnamese government delegation and British, American, Chinese delegation conferring for the evacuation of Hanoian commons in 1947.

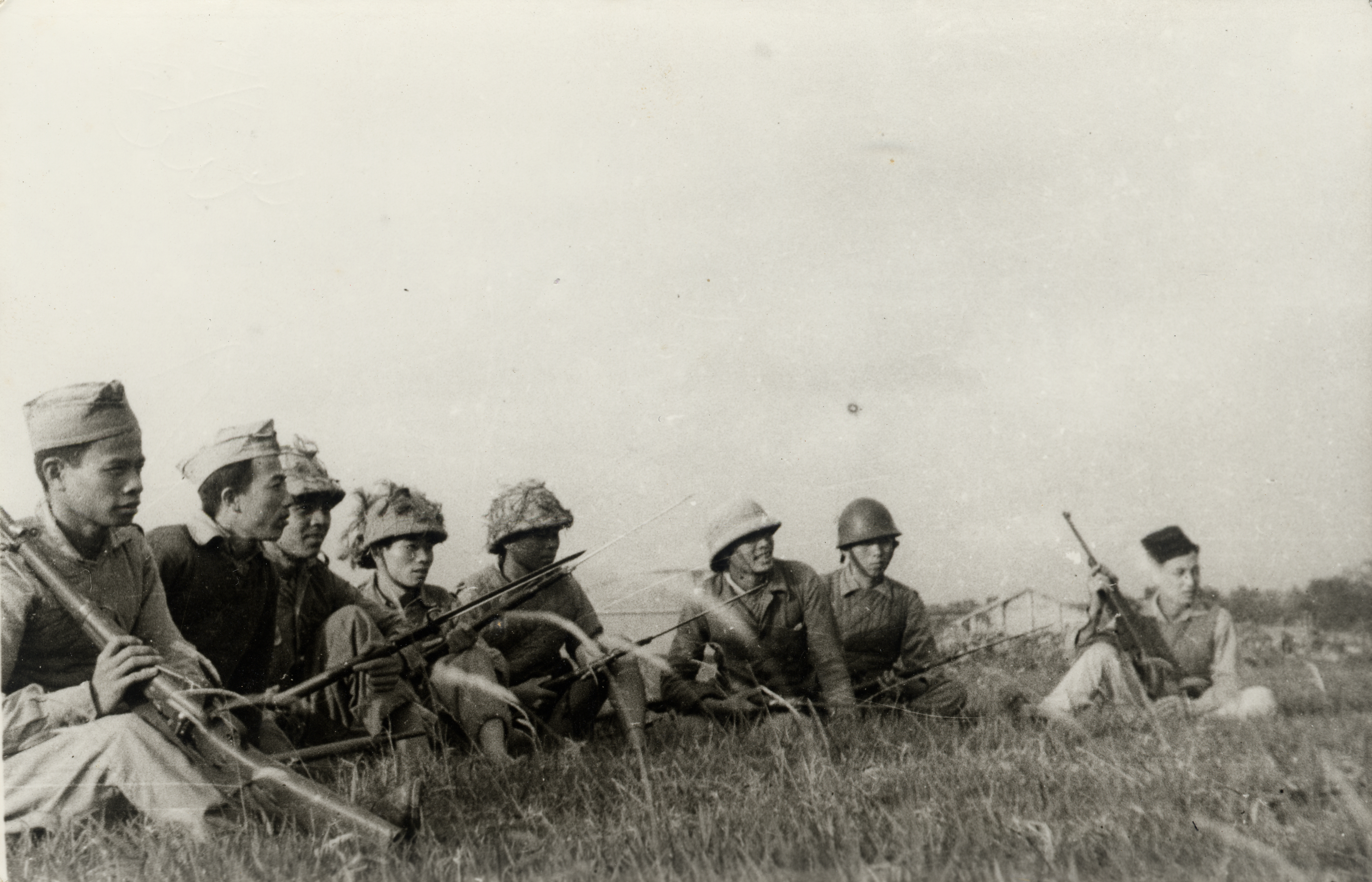
Colonial troops of the Thang-long Regiment, national guard, about to go into battle, December 1946. One of them has a Japanese helmet.

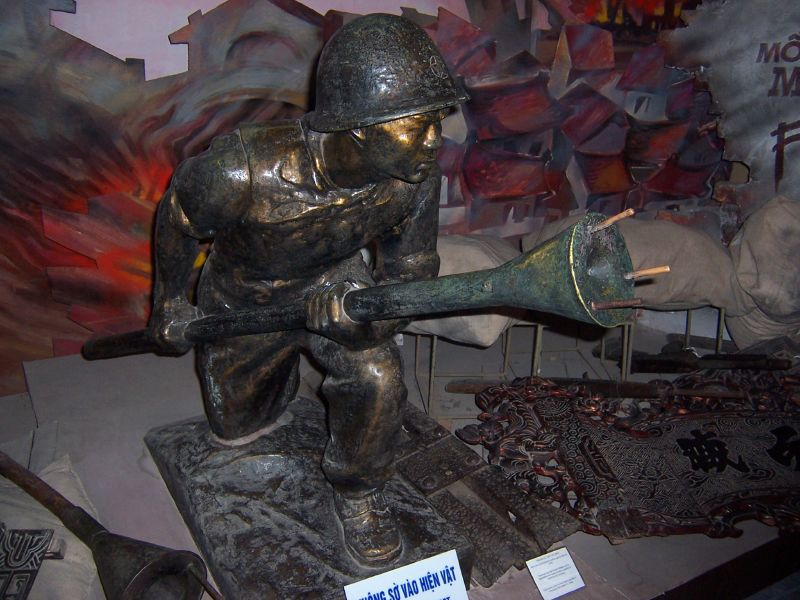
A statue of Nguyen Van Thieng holding his Lunge Anti-Tank Mine. Photo taken from the Vietnam Military History Museum, Hanoi, Vietnam.

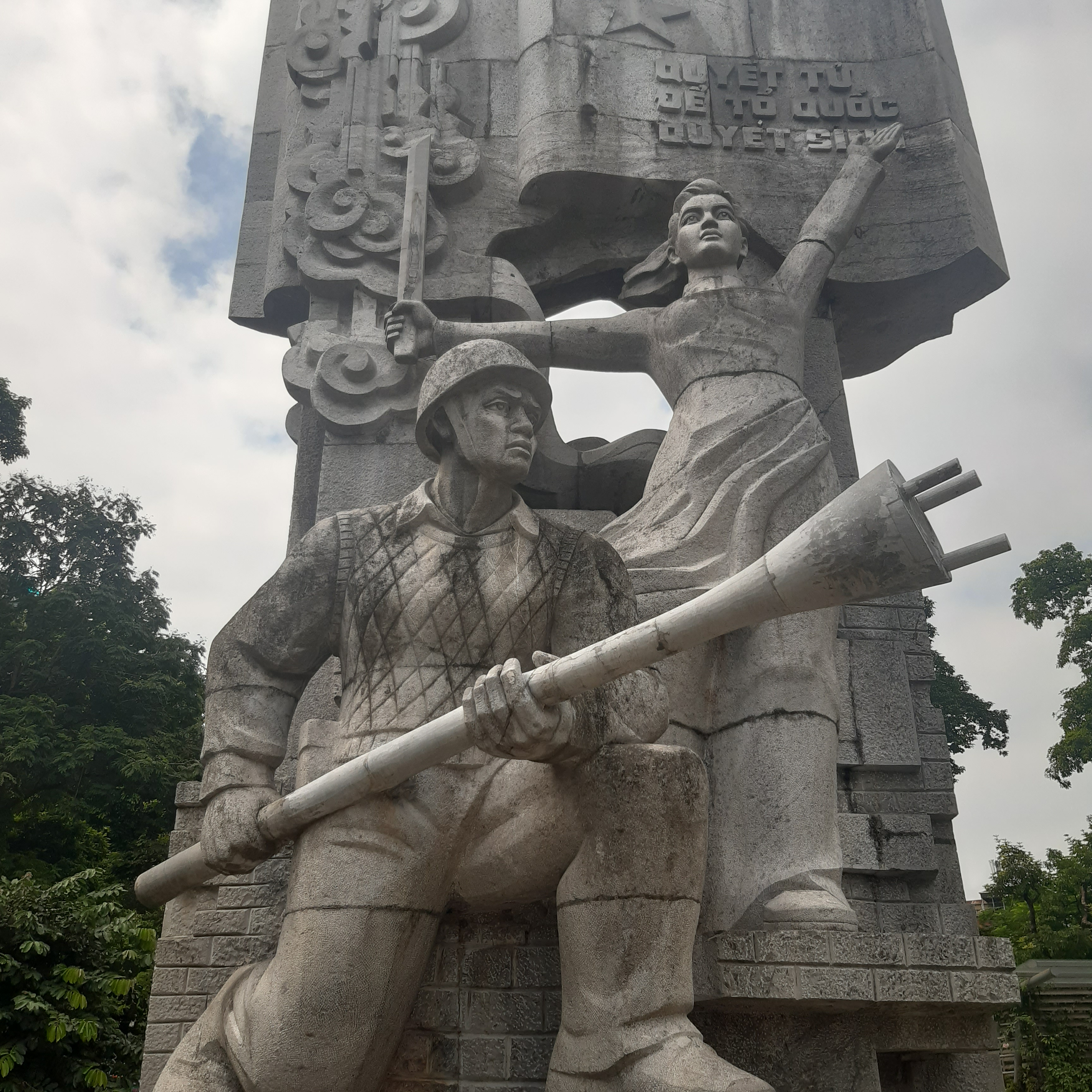
Statue of a figure carrying a lunge mine in Hanoi

== Memorials ==
- Monument Determined to Brave Death for the Survival of the Fatherland by artist Nguyễn-kim-Giao at Hàng-Dầu Street.
- Monument Determined to Brave Death for the Survival of the Fatherland by artists Vũ-đại-Bình and Mai-văn-Kế at Vạn-Xuân Park.
- Bronze sculpture Lunge Mine soldier by artist Trần-văn-Hòe.
- Sculpture Hanoi in the winter 1946 by Ngũ-xã's artists at the Đồng-Xuân Market.
- Statue of Nguyen Van Thieng holding his Lunge Anti-Tank Mine at the Vietnam Military History Museum in Hanoi, Vietnam.
