= 4th Military Region (People's Army of Vietnam) =

Military region of the People's Army of Vietnam

Coordinates: 19.2°N 105°E

Quân khu 4 (4th Military Region)
- Military Region emblem
- Active: 15 October 1945 – present
- Country: Vietnam
- Allegiance: People's Army of Vietnam
- Branch: Active duty
- Role: Regular force
- Size: Equivalent to Corps
- Part of: People's Army of Vietnam
- Garrison/HQ: Vinh, Nghệ An Province
- Engagements: First Indochina War; Vietnam War; Cambodian-Vietnamese War
- Decorations: Gold Star Order

Commanders
- Current commander: Lieutenant General Hà Thọ Bình
- Political commissar: Major General Đoàn Xuân Bường

The 4th Military Region of the People's Army of Vietnam is directly administered by the Ministry of Defence of Vietnam and tasked with the organization, creation, management and oversight of military forces in the North Central Coast of Vietnam. Its predecessor, the 4th War Zone (Vietnamese: Chiến khu 4) was established by the order of Ho Chi Minh on 15 October 1945, and this day has become the traditional day of the Military Zone. On 3 June 1957, Ho Chi Minh signed the ordinance 17/SL to establish 4th Military Zones on the basis of 4th Joint Zone (Vietnamese: Liên khu), simultaneously with other military zones: the North Vietnamese, North West, North East, Left Bank, Right Bank.

== Agencies ==
- Department of Staff
  - 3rd Guard Battalion
  - 12th Reconnaissance Battalion
  - 52nd Artillery Command Battalion
  - 31st Commando Battalion
  - 97th Electronic Warfare Battalion
  - 34th Technical Reconnaissance Detachment
  - 38th Chemical Defense Battalion
  - Communication Workshop
- Department of Politics
  - Division of Organisation
  - Division of Cadre
  - Division of Policy
  - Division of Propaganda and Training
  - Division of Thoughts and Culture
  - Military Court of Military Region
  - Military Procuratorate of Military Region
  - Military Museum of 4th Military Region
  - Newspaper of 4th Military Region
  - Troupe of 4th Military Region
  - Football Club of 4th Military Region
- Department of Logistics - Technical
  - 654th Mixed Transportation Brigade
    - 1st Transportation Battalion (KAMAZ truck)
    - 2nd Transportation Battalion (MAZ truck)
    - 3rd Marine Transportation Battalion (ST-294 patrol & troop transport ship)
    - 4th Transportation Battalion (KAMAZ truck)
  - K55 Supply Warehouse
  - 2nd Logistics Base
  - 41st Workshop
  - 467th Workshop
  - K1 Warehouse
  - K2 Technical Warehouse
  - K3 Warehouse
  - KX3 Warehouse (Fuel depot)
  - KX5 Warehouse
  - 4th Military Hospital
  - 268th Military Hospital
- 4th Military Region Military School

== Subordinate units ==
- Military Command of Thanh Hóa Province
  - Border Guard Command of Thanh Hóa
  - 20th Infantry Regiment
  - 21st Infantry Regiment
  - 762nd Infantry Regiment
  - Mechanized Reconnaissance Company (BTR-152)
  - Signals Company
  - Engineer Company
- Military Command of Nghệ An Province
  - Border Guard Command of Nghệ An
  - 22nd Infantry Regiment
  - 23rd Infantry Regiment
  - 24th Infantry Regiment
  - 764th Infantry Regiment
  - Mắt Island Mixed Battalion
  - Mechanized Reconnaissance Company (BTR-152)
  - 17th Engineer Company
  - 18th Signals Company
  - K70 Warehouse
- Military Command of Hà Tĩnh Province
  - Border Guard Command of Hà Tĩnh
  - 25th Infantry Regiment
  - 26th Infantry Regiment
  - 226th Infantry Regiment
  - 841st Infantry Regiment
  - Mechanized Reconnaissance Company (BTR-152)
  - 17th Engineer Company
  - 18th Signals Company
  - K19 Warehouse
- Military Command of Quảng Trị Province
  - Border Guard Command of Quảng Trị
  - Cồn Cỏ Mixed Battalion
  - 27th Infantry Regiment
  - 842nd Infantry Regiment
  - 996th Infantry Regiment
  - 2 Mechanized Reconnaissance Companies (BTR-152)
  - Guards - Military Police Platoon
  - Signals Company
  - Engineer Company
  - K6 Warehouse (ZiS-3, 61-K, ZPU)
  - Fuel Depot
  - 584th Recovery Unit (body recovery unit)
  - 589th Recovery Unit (body recovery unit)
- Military Command of Huế
  - Border Guard Command of Huế
  - 6th Infantry Regiment
  - 28th Infantry Regiment
  - 29th Infantry Regiment
  - 3rd Tank Battalion (PT-76, BTR-152, BRDM-2)
  - 594th Air Defense Battalion (61-K)
  - Guards - Military Police Platoon
  - 192nd Recovery Unit (body recovery unit)
- 324th Division
  - 1st Infantry Regiment
  - 3rd Infantry Regiment
  - 335th Infantry Regiment
  - 16th Air Defense Battalion
  - 18th Signals Battalion
- 341st Division
  - 266th Infantry Regiment
  - 270th Infantry Regiment
  - 273rd Infantry Regiment
  - 15th Anti-tank Battalion (B-10 recoilless rifle)
  - 16th Air Defense Battalion (DShK)
- 968th Division
  - 9th Infantry Regiment
  - 19th Infantry Regiment
  - 176th Infantry Regiment
  - 24th Medical Battalion
- 206th Tank Brigade
  - 1st Tank Battalion (T-54/T-55, PT-76)
  - 2nd Tank Battalion (T-54/T-55)
  - 3rd Armored Battalion (Type 63)
  - 12th Reconnaissance Company (BRDM-2)
  - 11th Technical Company
- 16th Artillery Brigade
  - 1st Artillery Battalion (M-30 howitzers, D-20 howitzers)
  - 2nd Artillery Battalion (M-30 howitzers, D-20 howitzers)
  - 3rd Artillery Battalion (BM-14MM MLRS)
  - Command Company
- 283rd Air Defense Brigade
  - 1st Air Defense Battalion (AZP S-60)
  - 2nd Air Defense Battalion (AZP S-60)
  - 3rd Air Defense Battalion (Type 65)
  - 4th Air Defense Battalion (Strela-2)
- 414th Engineer Brigade
  - 1st Engineer Battalion
  - 2nd Engineer Battalion
  - 3rd Engineer Battalion
  - 4th River Crossing Battalion (PTS, PMP floating bridge, GSP-55)
- 80th Signals Brigade
  - 1st Signals Battalion
  - 2nd Signals Battalion (VCD3 SATCOM vehicle)
  - 3rd Signals Battalion
- 4th Economic - Defense Group
- 5th Economic - Defense Group
- 92nd Economic - Defense Group
- 337th Economic - Defense Group
- Company of Economic Cooperation (VNPA's Laos Economic Cooperation Group)

=== Independent units ===
- 215th Tank Brigade of Tank - Armored Arms (Nghệ An Province)
  - 1st Tank Battalion (T-54/T-55, T-54M)
  - 2nd Storage Battalion (T-54/T-55, T-54M)
  - 3rd Storage Battalion (T-54/T-55, T-54M)
  - Reconnaissance Company (BRDM-2)
  - Engineer Company (GSP-55 ferry)
  - Signals Company
  - Transportation Company
  - Repair Company (KAMAZ Klintsy crane truck)
- 971st Transportation Brigade of Vehicle - Transportation Department (HQ: Hanoi)
  - 682nd Transportation Battalion (Zil-130, Renault truck) (Nghệ An Province)

== Successive Commander and Leadership ==
=== Commanders ===
- Major General Lê Thiết Hùng (1946–1947): Leader (Vietnamese: Khu trưởng) of 4th War Zone (Vietnamese: Chiến khu).
- Chu Văn Tấn (1947–1948): Leader of 4th War Zone.
- Major General Nguyễn Sơn (1948–1949): Commander of 4th Joint Zone (Vietnamese: Liên khu)
- Colonel Hoàng Minh Thảo (1949–1950): After that, he was Senior Lieutenant General, Professor, honoured as People's Teacher of Vietnam.
- Trần Sâm: Major General (1959), Lieutenant General (1974), Colonel General (1986).
- Major General Nguyễn Đôn (1956–1959): Lieutenant General (1974)
- Major General Chu Huy Mân (1961–1962): Colonel General (1974), General (1980), vice-Chairman of the State Council.
- Major General Trần Văn Quang (1962–1965): Lieutenant General (1974), Colonel General (1984).
- Senior Colonel Vũ Nam Long (1965–1966): Lieutenant General in 1981.
- Senior Colonel Đàm Quang Trung (1967–1971): Major General (April 1974), Lieutenant General (January 1980), Colonel General (1984), vice-chairman of the State Council Vietnam.
- Major General Vương Thừa Vũ (1971–1973): Lieutenant General (1974).
- Major General Đàm Quang Trung (1973–1976)
- Major General Hoàng Minh Thi (1978–1982): member of Central Committee of the Communist Party of Vietnam (1976–1982)
- Lieutenant General Hoàng Cầm (1982–1986): Colonel General (1987), General Inspector of the Army.
- Lieutenant General Nguyễn Quốc Thước : former vice-Chairman and Secretary-General of Vietnam Veterans Association
- Lieutenant General Nguyễn Khắc Dương
- Lieutenant General Trương Đình Thanh (2002–2005)
- Lieutenant General Đoàn Sinh Hưởng (2005–2009)
- Lieutenant General Nguyễn Hữu Cường (2009-2014)
- Lieutenant General Nguyễn Tân Cương (2014-2018)
- Lieutenant General Nguyễn Doãn Anh (2018-2022)
- Lieutenant General Hà Thọ Bình (2022-present)

=== Political Commissioners, Deputy Commanders of Politics ===
- Trần Văn Quang (1946–1948): Political Commissar of War Zone 4.
- Major General Nguyễn Sơn (1948–1949)
- Trần Sâm: Major General (1959), Lieutenant General (1974), Colonel General (1986).
- Major General Chu Huy Mân (1957–1958)
- Major General Nguyễn Trọng Vĩnh (1958–1961)
- Major General Chu Huy Mân (1961–1962)
- Major General Lê Hiến Mai (1965–1967)
- Major General Hoàng Kiện (1967–1970)
- Major General Đàm Quang Trung (1973–1975)
- Lieutenant General Đặng Hòa (1982–1988)
- Major General Lê Văn Giánh
- Major General Phạm Văn Long
- Lieutenant General Phạm Hồng Minh (-1/3/2007)
- Major General Mai Quang Phấn (3/2007-2012 )
- Lieutenant General Võ Văn Việt (2012-2017)
- Lieutenant General Trần Võ Dũng (2017-2025)
- Major General Đoàn Xuân Bường (2025-present)
