= Haiphong incident =

1946 bombardment of Haiphong, French Indochina

Haiphong Incident
- Haiphong on a map
Date	November 23, 1946
Location	Haiphong, Tonkin, French Indochina
Result	French victory
Territorial changes	French rule restored in Haiphong

Belligerents
French Union: France; French Indochina	Democratic Republic of Vietnam: (North Vietnam) Việt Minh

Commanders and leaders
(French Fourth Republic) Pierre-Louis Debès	Unknown

Strength
1 heavy cruiser 3 avisos	Unknown

Casualties and losses
29 killed	Unknown
- 2,000 to 6,000 Vietnamese killed (mostly civilians), 25,000 injured

The Haiphong Incident or the Haiphong Massacre occurred on November 23, 1946, when the French cruiser Suffren and several avisos bombarded the Vietnamese coastal city of Haiphong, killing between 2,000 and 6,000 Vietnamese. On December 2, the city was completely seized by the French. The incident, also known as the Shelling of Haiphong, is thought of as the first armed clash in a series of events that would lead to the Battle of Hanoi on December 19, 1946, and with it the official outbreak of the First Indochina War.

== Background ==
After World War II, the future of the Vietnamese territory was in question. After being under years of French colonial rule followed by Japanese rule during the war, Vietnam began to seek independence. Specifically, the Japanese renounced French claims to the Vietnamese territory on March 9, 1945, officially declaring Vietnam independent over France and under the control of Emperor Bảo Đại. This was counteracted by a rebellion on September 2, 1945, when Ho Chi Minh and his guerilla army declared the official birth of the Democratic Republic of Vietnam. Ho Chi Minh became the leader of the Vietnamese Communist Party, and demanded complete autonomy from Europe.

The French disregarded these claims of autonomy and quickly moved to resettle Vietnam as a member for the French Union. However, complete colonization was no longer an option due to power dynamics in the west and on March 6, 1946, after receiving pressure from the western allies, Jean Sainteny, French Commissioner for Northern Indochina met with Ho Chi Minh in Hanoi and signed the Ho–Sainteny agreement. The agreement officially gave Vietnam independence as "a free state with its own government, parliament, army and finances, forming part of the Indochinese Federation and the French Union". Additionally, the treaty allowed for the French to have a military presence in Vietnam for the following five years.

At the time of the signing, it was widely thought that Ho Chi Minh had given many concessions to the French. By allowing the continued presence of the French army, Ho Chi Minh allowed for a continuation of the French colonial control of the past. The Communist newspaper Les Temps modernes criticized the signing of the deal, calling the agreement "the lamentable surrender of all our [Communists] ideological and political plans". On the French side, Thierry d'Argenlieu illustrated French optimism regarding the treaty in a communiqué he wrote to the Parisian government: "On the French level, the armed forces are assured of a friendly reception and we are pre-empting any reproach for opening hostilities ... We are fully safeguarding French economic and cultural interests now and for the future." Vietnamese worries in regards to the agreement soon came to fruition as France began to exert the same colonial authority it had formally denounced in the treaty. France created a virtual naval blockade of Haiphong by continuing to have a strong naval presence in the Gulf of Tonkin. That led the Vietnamese to reach out for peace talks to curb French influence in the region. These peace talks came in the form of the Fontainebleau Agreements, which occurred at the Palace of Fontainebleau and were led by Phạm Văn Đồng for the Vietnamese and Max André on the side of the French, beginning on July 6, 1946. The conference at the palace was held to discuss the provisions of the Ho-Sainteny Agreement. At the conference, the French refused to revise the original treaty in any way. The Vietnamese leadership, led by Ho Chi Minh, settled to sign a modus vivendi, postponing talks to a later date. These talks never occurred due to the outbreak of violence in November.

== The Incident ==
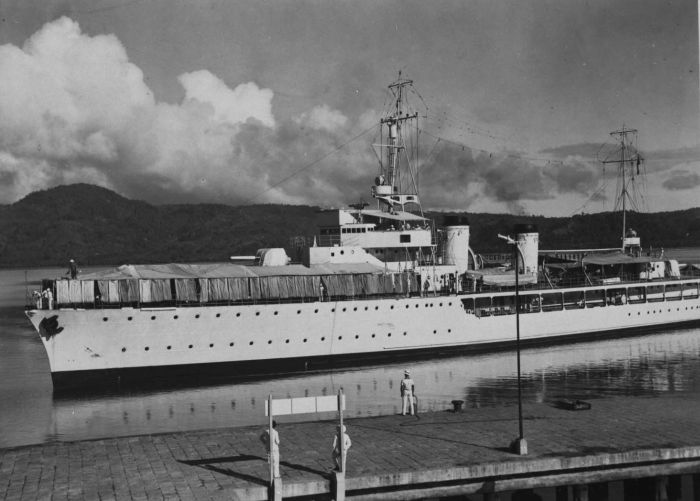
The Dumont d'Urville in Dutch East Indies, 1930-1936

On the morning of November 20, 1946, a French patrol ship seized a Chinese junk attempting to bring contraband into Haiphong. While seemingly routine, the seizure of the ship was the beginning of a chain of unfortunate events. Vietnamese soldiers reacted to the seizure by firing on the French ship from the shore, killing 23 soldiers. Armed clashes immediately broke out on land between French and Vietnamese nationalists, with a French burial party being ambushed, losing six more men. The French immediately worked to dissipate the conflict and stopped the outbreak by agreeing to respect Vietnamese sovereignty in Haiphong on November 22, 1946.

This, however, was only the beginning of the incident. Once the news of the skirmish came to Admiral d'Argenlieu in Paris, he sent a cable to Jean Étienne Valluy, commander of French forces in Indochina, ordering him to use force against the Vietnamese in Haiphong. Valluy, in turn, sent an order to Colonel Debès, commander of the French troops at Haiphong, stating, "It appears clear that we are up against premeditated aggressions carefully staged by the Vietnamese regular army ... The moment has come to give a severe lesson to those who have treacherously attacked you. Use all the means at your disposal to make yourself complete master of Haiphong." Debès then issued an ultimatum to the Vietnamese in Haiphong demanding a withdrawal from the French section and Chinese sections of the city, including the port. In the order, Debès invoked the Franco-Chinese agreement of February 28, 1946, as justification for demanding the Vietnamese evacuation of parts of the city. Debès argued that the treaty gave France protective rights over the Chinese in Vietnam and thus gave them jurisdiction to engage in combat.

After the Vietnamese failed to evacuate in time, the French began a bombardment of the Vietnamese sections of the city, using three French avisos: Chevreuil (Chamois-class minesweeping sloop), Savorgnan de Brazza and Dumont d'Urville.

The role of the cruiser Suffren in the bombardment is controversial, as some versions of events suggest the ship participated in the shelling and others claim it arrived after the action had already been carried out. By November 28, 1946, Colonel Debès had taken complete control over the town.

While reports about the total number of casualties from the bombardment range widely from upwards of twenty thousand to less than one hundred. Today the most commonly cited estimate is around 6,000 deaths as reported by the French sociologist Paul Mus. The historian Georgette Elgey considers this estimate to be perhaps excessive as it represents 10% of the city's population, but nevertheless describes the incident as by far the deadliest of the war.

The Viet Minh spread an estimate of 10,000 to 20,000 killed. French intelligence services also secretly spread this figure with intention of showing that the communist Vietnamese state could not protect its population from the French military. In a letter from December 1946, Ho Chi Minh reported around 3,000 killed during the incident in the fighting. General Valluy estimated that there were 300 killed. The US consul reported around 2,000 killed.

In return, French forces lost 29 men killed in Hai Phong from November 20 to 23.

== Aftermath ==
=== Attempted reconciliation ===
Immediately after the shelling, the French government sought peace. All violence was ended by the afternoon of November 22 and tensions seemed to have been alleviated. This was not the case. Less than two weeks after the shelling, after receiving pressure from Paris to "teach the Vietnamese a lesson" General Morlière ordered a complete Vietnamese withdrawal from the city, demanding all Viet Minh military elements to be evacuated from Haiphong. On 2 December 1946, Haiphong was under complete French military occupation.

The aggressive actions of the French regarding the occupation of Haiphong made it clear in the eyes of the Viet Minh that the French intended on maintaining a colonial presence in Vietnam. The threat of the French establishing a separate southern state in Vietnam by besieging the city of Hanoi became a top priority for the Viet Minh to counteract.

On December 2, as a final effort to maintain good relations between the two nations, French Commissioner Sainteny (of the Ho–Sainteny agreement) visited Hanoi to reach an agreement for a ceasefire. This proved unsuccessful as the French insistence on maintaining complete military control of Haiphong stalled all negotiations. The December 16 election of the socialist Léon Blum as the Premier of France offered hope to Ho Chi Minh and the Vietnamese, as the French socialists had a much more tolerant policy towards Vietnamese independence. That hope proved to be misplaced, as by the time Blum came into office violence between the Vietnamese and French was already widespread.

=== The onset of war ===
As relations between France and Vietnam continued to worsen, Ho Chi Minh issued a plea for peace between the two nations on December 12, stating, "Neither France nor Viet Nam can afford the luxury of a bloody war". Ho, however, was not completely supported in his call for peace. Võ Nguyên Giáp, leader of the Vietnamese army was convinced that open confrontation was inevitable. Giap was certain that the takeover of Haiphong signaled France's intent to attack and take over Hanoi. This led to Giap focusing on arming the Hanoi militias in preparation for an attack. The Vietnamese media reflected the concerns of General Giap. In an article on December 10, 1946, a Hanoi newspaper stated, "The grave hour has arrived. The Hanoi Committee of the Việt Minh Front calls on the people to be calm, to be united, and to be ready to rise when the government gives the order [to rebel against the French]." The Vietminh government, in turn, reacted to the plea to prepare, building barricades in the streets of Hanoi and engaging in armed skirmishes with French legionnaires.

The final ultimatum to the Vietnamese was issued on December 19, when General Morlière ordered the leading Viet Minh militia, Tu Ve ("self-defence"), to completely disarm. That night, all electricity was turned off in Hanoi and the city was left in complete darkness. The Vietnamese (specifically the Tu Ve militia) attacked the French from within Hanoi with machine guns, artillery, and mortars. Thousands of French soldiers and Vietnamese civilians lost their lives. The French reacted by storming Hanoi the following day, forcing the Vietnamese government to take refuge outside of the city. Ho Chi Minh himself was forced to flee Hanoi for a more remote mountainous area. The attack can be characterized as a preemptive strike against the French after the overtaking of Haiphong endangered Vietnamese claims to Hanoi and all of Vietnam. The uprising in Hanoi escalated the aggression between the French and Viet Minh into the First Indochina War.

== See also ==
- Battle of Hanoi (1946)
- First Indochina War topics
- France–Vietnam relations
- French Indochina
