= Georges Thierry d'Argenlieu =

French Navy admiral (1889-1964)

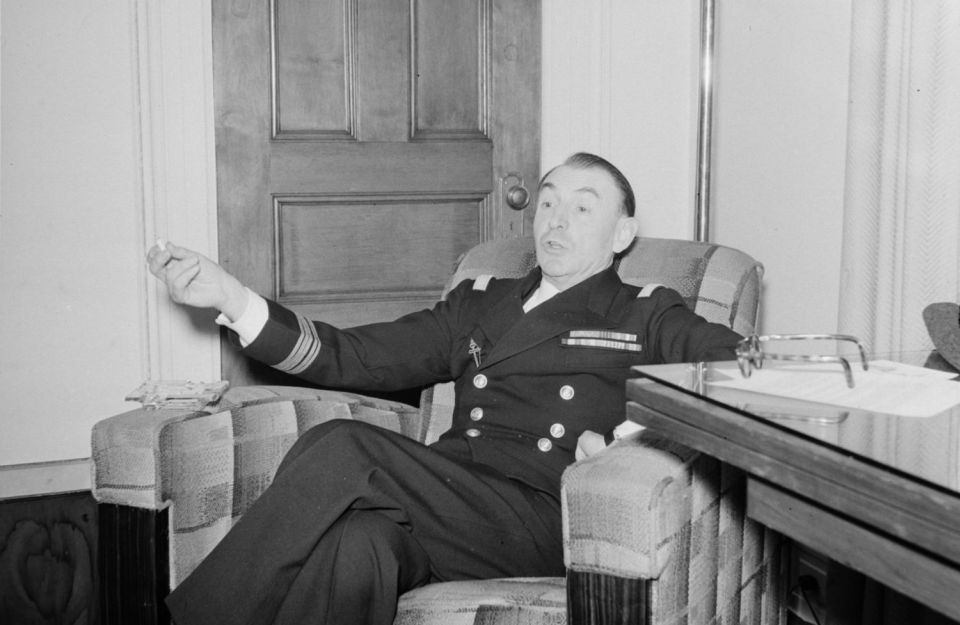
- Georges Thierry d'Argenlieu as Charles de Gaulle's representative in Canada, March 1941.
- Born: 7 August 1889; Brest, France
- Died: 7 September 1964 (aged 75); Brest, France
- Military career
- Allegiance: France; Free French Forces
- Branch: French Navy; Free French Naval Forces
- Service years: 1912-1947
- Rank: Admiral
- Conflicts: World War I; World War II; Battle of France; Battle of Dakar; Battle of Gabon; First Indochina War; Haiphong incident
- Awards: Grand Cross of the Légion d'Honneur; Compagnon de la Libération; Médaille Militaire; Croix de Guerre
- Native name: Louis de la Trinité, OCD

Orders
- Ordination: 1925

Personal details
- Denomination: Catholic Church

Georges Thierry d'Argenlieu (French pronunciation: [ʒɔʁʒ tjɛʁi daʁʒɑ̃ljø]), in religion Father Louis of the Trinity, OCD (7 August 1889 – 7 September 1964), was a Discalced Carmelite friar and priest, who was also a diplomat and French Navy officer and admiral; he became a major personality of the Forces navales françaises libres. He was the chancellor of the Ordre de la Libération.

== Early career ==
He was born in Brest on 7 August 1889, in a family of Navy officers. He joined the École navale (Naval Academy) at 17.

D'Argenlieu served on the Du Chayla as a midshipman, taking part in the campaign in Morocco, which led to the Treaty of Fez, in 1912. During the campaign, he was awarded the Legion of Honour, and befriended Hubert Lyautey, something that d'Argenlieu later recalled as one of the happy memories in his life.

== First World War ==
During the First World War, d'Argenlieu served in the Mediterranean; in 1915, while on leave in Malta, he became a member of the Secular Order of Discalced Carmelites. He was promoted to lieutenant de vaisseau in 1917. The next year, as commanding officer of a patrol boat, the Tourterelle, he distinguished himself in the rescue of a troop transport.

== Religious career ==
Upon the conclusion of the war, d'Argenlieu undertook theological studies at the Pontifical Angelicum College, the future Pontifical University of St. Thomas Aquinas, Angelicum in Rome, which he completed in 1920. That year, he entered the novitiate of the Discalced Carmelite friars in Avon, Seine-et-Marne. He was given the religious habit and the religious name Louis de la Trinité (Louis of the Trinity) and he made his first vows on 15 September 1921.

Fr. Louis then studied theology for four years at the Catholic University of Lille. He finished his studies there and was ordained a priest there in 1925. The Discalced Carmelite friars re-established the province of Paris in 1932, and Fr. Louis was elected Prior Provincial in 1935.

== Second World War ==
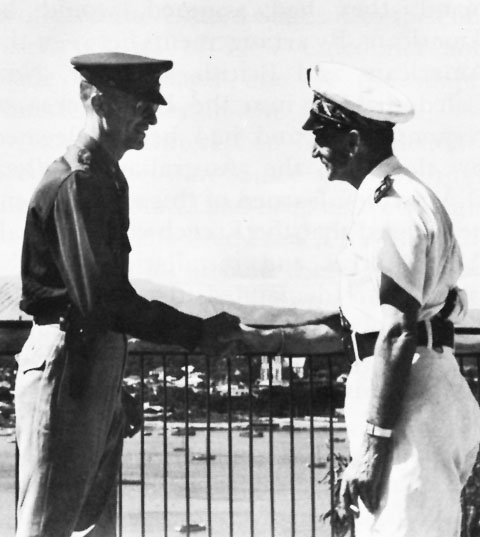
Georges Thierry d'Argenlieu (right) with Brigadier General Alexander M. Patch.

In September 1939, d'Argenlieu was mobilised as a reserve Navy officer, rising to the rank of capitaine de corvette in 1940. During the Battle of France, d'Argenlieu was captured as he was defending the arsenal of Cherbourg. After three days, he escaped from the prisoner train to Germany and joined Charles de Gaulle on 30 June.

D'Argenlieu joined the Free French Forces, intending to serve as chaplain, but eventually took on the duties of a fighting naval officer, with a special authorisation of his religious superiors because of the small number of Navy officers in the Free French Naval Forces. He was made chief of staff in July.

He attempted to convince the Vichy French governor of Dakar to join De Gaulle and was severely wounded when he was fired upon in his small and unarmed craft on 23 September, during the Battle of Dakar. In November, he directed successful operations in Gabon.

D'Argenlieu was made a capitaine de vaisseau, and chancellor of the newly created Ordre de la Libération. In 1941, he rose to counter admiral; he undertook several missions to administer French colonies loyal to Free France.

In 1943, he was made commanding officer for the naval forces in Great Britain On 14 June 1944, he ferried de Gaulle to France aboard the destroyer La Combattante, and entered Paris with him on 25 August.

== First Indochina War ==
After the defeat of Japan, d'Argenlieu arrived in French Indochina on 31 October 1945. As High Commissioner of the French Far East Expeditionary Corps, his task was to restore the French colonial administration. In 1946, he was promoted to vice-amiral d'escadre, and soon later to admiral. As High Commissioner in Indochina, he installed a puppet Autonomous Republic of Cochinchina in violation of the March 6 Ho–Sainteny agreement whilst the Viet Minh leadership was in negotiations in France, effectively beginning the First Indochina War.

Starting the war, he ordered the French forces in Haiphong on November 23, 1946, to "Use all the means at your disposal to make yourself complete master of Haiphong", resulting in the Haiphong Massacre, in which about 6,000 Vietnamese civilians were killed.

During the war, his actions grew more and more controversial, and in March 1947, he was replaced by Émile Bollaert. Back in France, he was made inspector general of the Naval Forces before retiring to a monastery.

== Later life ==
In 1958, sick, d'Argenlieu resigned his position of chancellor of the Ordre de la Libération and withdrew to monastery life again. He died on 7 September 1964 in Brest and was buried in Avrechy.

== Honours ==
- Grand Cross of the Légion d'Honneur
- Compagnon de la Libération
- Médaille Militaire
- Croix de Guerre 39–45 with 3 palms
- Croix de Guerre des Théâtres d'Opérations Extérieures (TOE) with palm
- Médaille de la Résistance avec rosette
- Insigne des blessés militaires
- Médaille du Sauvetage
- Médaille du Maroc
- Belgian Croix de Guerre with palm
- Commander of the Order of Léopold (Belgium)
- Companion of the Order of the Bath (UK)
- Médaille du Sauvetage
- Médaille du Maroc

== Works ==
- La Croix de la Libération, Paris 1951
- Chroniques d'Indochine 1945-1947, Paris 1985
- Souvenirs de Guerre : juin 1940-janvier 1941, Paris 1973
