= Battle of Vĩnh Yên =

1951 battle of the First Indochina War

- Part of the First Indochina War
Date	January 13–17, 1951
Location	Vĩnh Yên, Vĩnh Phúc, Vietnam
Result	French Union victory

Belligerents
French Union: France; State of Vietnam	Democratic Republic of Vietnam: (North Vietnam) Việt Minh

Commanders and leaders
(French Fourth Republic) Jean de Lattre de Tassigny	(North Vietnam) Võ Nguyên Giáp (North Vietnam) Hoàng Văn Thái (North Vietnam) Vương Thừa Vũ (North Vietnam) Chu Văn Tấn

Strength
9,000 French Union troops	22,000 Viet Minh troops

Casualties and losses
43 killed 545 missing/captured 160 wounded	Western estimate: 6,000–9,000 killed 8,000 wounded 500–600 captured Viet Minh figures: 815 killed or missing 2,048 wounded

The Battle of Vĩnh Yên (Vietnamese: Trận Vĩnh Yên) which occurred from 13 to 17 January 1951, was a major engagement in the First Indochina War between the French Union and the communist Việt Minh. The French Union forces, including the French Armed Forces and Vietnamese National Army, led by World War II hero Jean de Lattre de Tassigny, inflicted a decisive defeat on the Việt Minh forces, which were commanded by Võ Nguyên Giáp. This victory of the French Union (France and State of Vietnam) against the communists marked a turn in the tide of the war, which was previously characterized by a number of Việt Minh victories.

== Prelude ==
By October 1950, the Việt Minh had seized the initiative from the French. Operating from bases in the People's Republic of China, Việt Minh troops under Giáp constantly raided French outposts along Route Coloniale 4. At the end of the attacks on October 17, the French had lost 6,000 troops, stunning the French government into action: the high commissioner for Indochina, Leon Pignon, and the commander-in-chief of the French Expeditionary Corps, General Marcel Carpentier, were both recalled. Paris replaced them with General Jean de Lattre de Tassigny, widely considered one of the greatest French commanders after his spectacular leadership of the French First Army in World War II.

De Lattre came to Hanoi, Vietnam, on 17 December and assumed both military and political control of French Indochina. The French Far East Expeditionary Corps numbered some 190,000, including 10,000 serving in the French Air Force and 5,000 in the French Navy. The French occupied most of the country, but the Việt Minh held considerable portions of the countryside that allowed quick and easy access to various crucial points should the need arise. Giáp had five divisions, all armed and equipped by the Chinese, composed of about 10,000 troops each. Four of the five Vietnamese divisions were roughly 150 miles (241 km) north of Hanoi, stationed around the Việt Bắc region near the Chinese border. The 320th Division was located southwest of the Red River Delta, which was controlled by the French.

The dawn of 1951 heralded tremendous prospects for Việt Minh success. Giáp and Communist Party strategists planned for a massive offensive which would drive the French out of their homeland. Giáp decided to strike straight for Hanoi and chose Vĩnh Yên, 30 miles northwest of the capital and the tip of the French defensive triangle, for the main blow.

== Battle ==
=== French invasion ===
Vĩnh Yên was defended by two French mobile groups (GM) of 3,000 men each. GM 3 guarded the town itself whereas GM 1 held a series of key blocking positions to the east. Giáp hoped to drive a wedge between the two forces by pinning GM 3 against the Dam Vac lake to the south and then defeating the French in detail. In late December, Giáp had moved the 308th and 312th divisions from the Việt Bắc into position along the Tam Dao ridge. On January 13, 1951, he attacked.

=== The battle ===
The 308th Division made a diversionary attack on Bao Chuc, a small outpost about two miles north of Vĩnh Yên. GM 3 quickly moved north to relieve the beleaguered 50-man garrison, but they were ambushed by forces from the 312th Division at Dao Tu. A series of heavy air strikes and artillery barrages eventually allowed GM 3 to disengage and return to Vĩnh Yên, but not before it had lost an entire battalion and had another severely damaged. Việt Minh forces followed their success by taking a string of hills in front of Vĩnh Yên.

On 14 January, de Lattre arrived in Vĩnh Yên to take personal command of the fighting. He ordered GM 2 to come from Hanoi as a reserve, GM 1 to attack west and break through to the town, and also called for heavy air strikes along with more reinforcements. GM 1 managed to successfully advance along Route 2 and joined GM 3 for a number of attacks which drove the Việt Minh out of the hills they had recently captured. On 16 January, however, the Việt Minh launched a massive human-wave assault with the entire 308th division. De Lattre replied by ordering the largest French air strike of the entire war, in which napalm was used for the first time on a large scale. Giáp's troops initially fled, only to come back and continue fighting. In the early hours of 17 January, French soldiers on Hill 101 ran out of ammunition and withdrew, soon followed by the Việt Minh capture of Hill 47. Giáp now had control of the center while the French controlled hills 210 and 157 on the flanks. At dawn, the 308th Division attacked again.

De Lattre used GM 2, his last reserve, to support Hill 47 while GM 3 was sent to the isolated French position on Hill 210. More air and napalm strikes followed both attacks. Finally, French aerial forces proved decisive. The 308th Division began to retreat and the 312th launched one more desperate attack to reverse the decision, but it was too late. By noon on 17 January, both Việt Minh divisions scrambled for the mountains.

== Aftermath ==
Although this impressive victory of France and the State of Vietnam against the communists did not provide any short-term reprieve—Giáp would try to breach the line again shortly—it was a morale booster for French forces and confirmed that Paris had made the right decision in picking de Lattre to lead the effort against the communist Việt Minh. Strategically, the battle meant that the war would go on and ultimate victory would not be easy for either side.

== Bibliography ==
- Clodfelter, M. (2008). Warfare and armed conflicts : a statistical encyclopedia of casualty and other figures, 1494-2007. McFarland. ISBN 978-0786433193.
- Davidson, Phillip B. (1991). Vietnam at War: The History, 1946-1975. Oxford University Press. ISBN 978-0195067927.
- Gras, Yves (1992). Histoire de la Guerre d'Indochine, L'aventure coloniale de la France. Denoël. p. 382. ISBN 9782207239582.
- Joes, Anthony J. (2001). The war for South Viet Nam, 1954-1975. Bloomsbury Academic. ISBN 978-0275968069.
- Keegan, John (1983). World Armies. Macmillan. ISBN 978-0333340790.
- Luguern, Joël (1997). Le Viêt-nam (in French). KARTHALA Editions. ISBN 978-2865376438.
- Logevall, Frederik (2012). Embers of war: the fall of an empire and the making of America's Vietnam. Random House. ISBN 9780375756474.
- Morgan, Ted (2010). Valley of Death: The Tragedy at Dien Bien Phu That Led America into the Vietnam War. Random House Publishing Group. ISBN 978-1588369802.
- Rutherford, Scott (2002). Vietnam. APA. ISBN 978-9812349842.
- Stone, David (2018). Dien Bien Phu 1954. Batsford. ISBN 978-1849945189.
- Tucker, Spencer (1999). Vietnam. University Press of Kentucky. ISBN 9781857289220.
- Van Nguyen Duong (2014). The Tragedy of the Vietnam War: A South Vietnamese Officer's Analysis. McFarland. ISBN 978-0786483389.
- Warren, James A. (2013). Giap: The General Who Defeated America in Vietnam. St. Martin's Publishing Group. ISBN 978-1137098917.
