= Ho–Sainteny Agreement =

1946 treaty between Vietnam and France

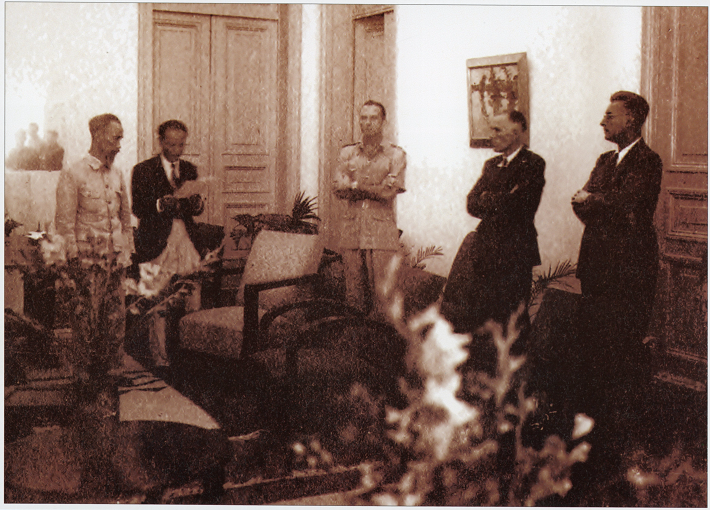
The signing of the Preliminary Agreement in Hanoi, 6 March 1946

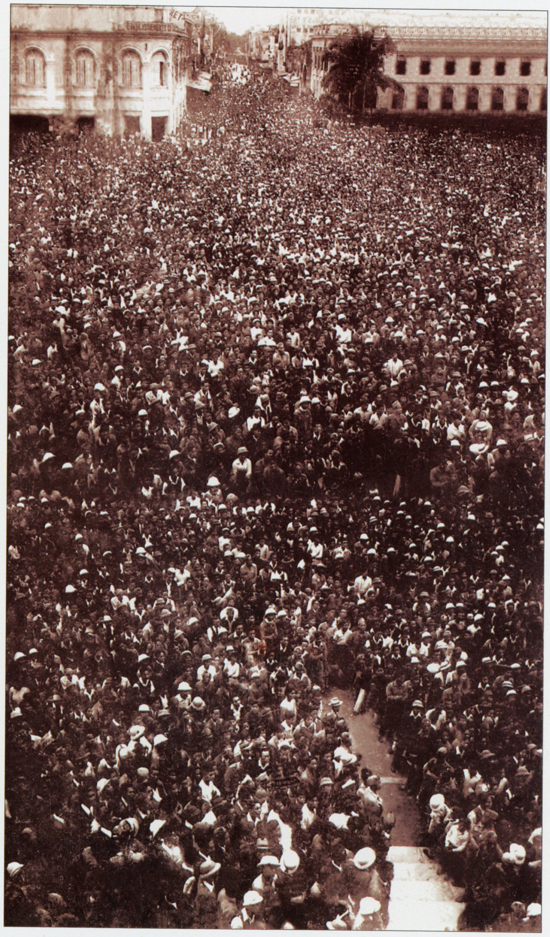
A huge crowd gathers at the Hanoi Municipal Theatre Square to hear the government explain the newly signed Preliminary Agreement, March 7, 1946.

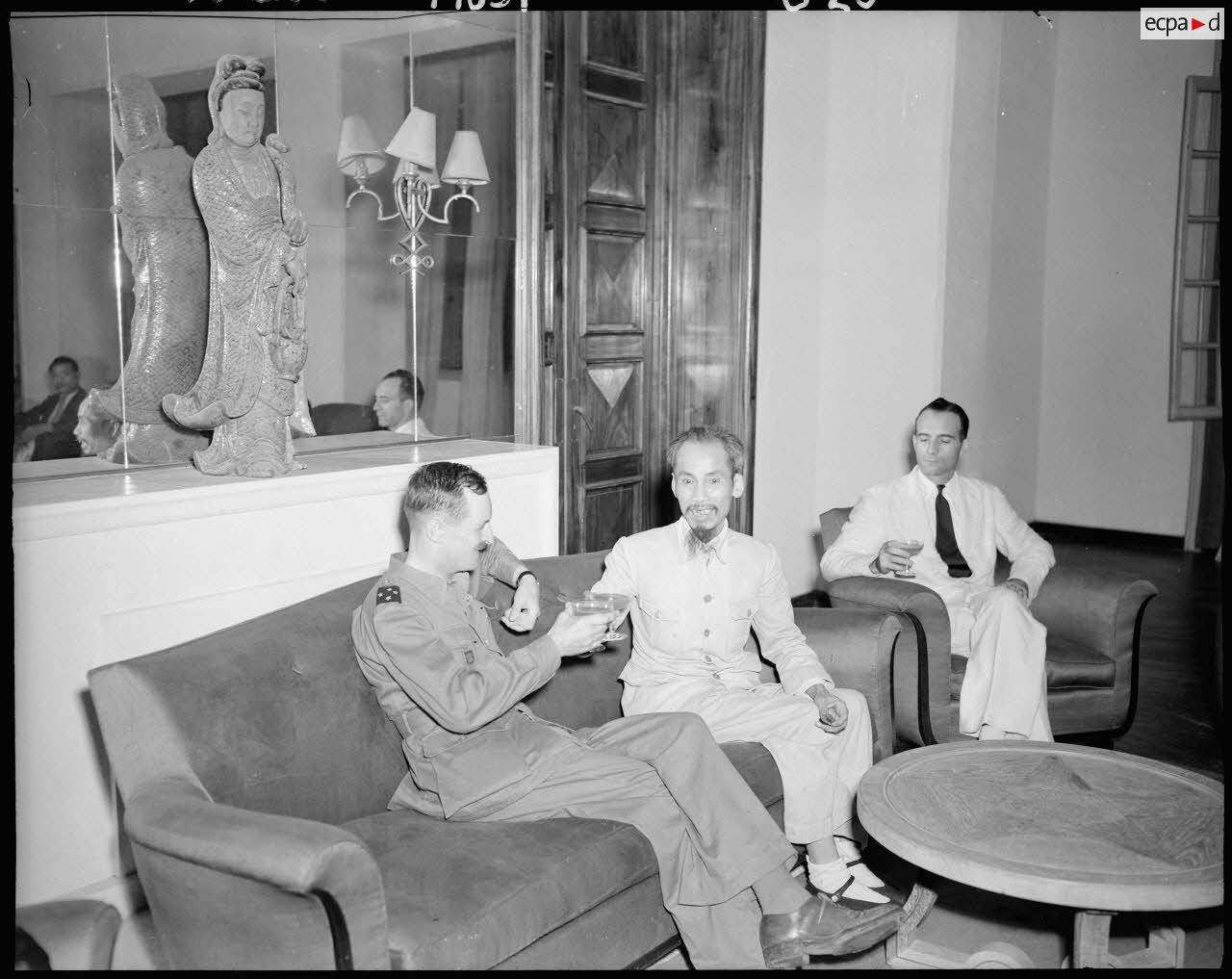
General Leclerc, leader of French army in Indochina, toasts with Hồ Chí Minh, in the presence of Jean Sainteny, 18 March 1946.

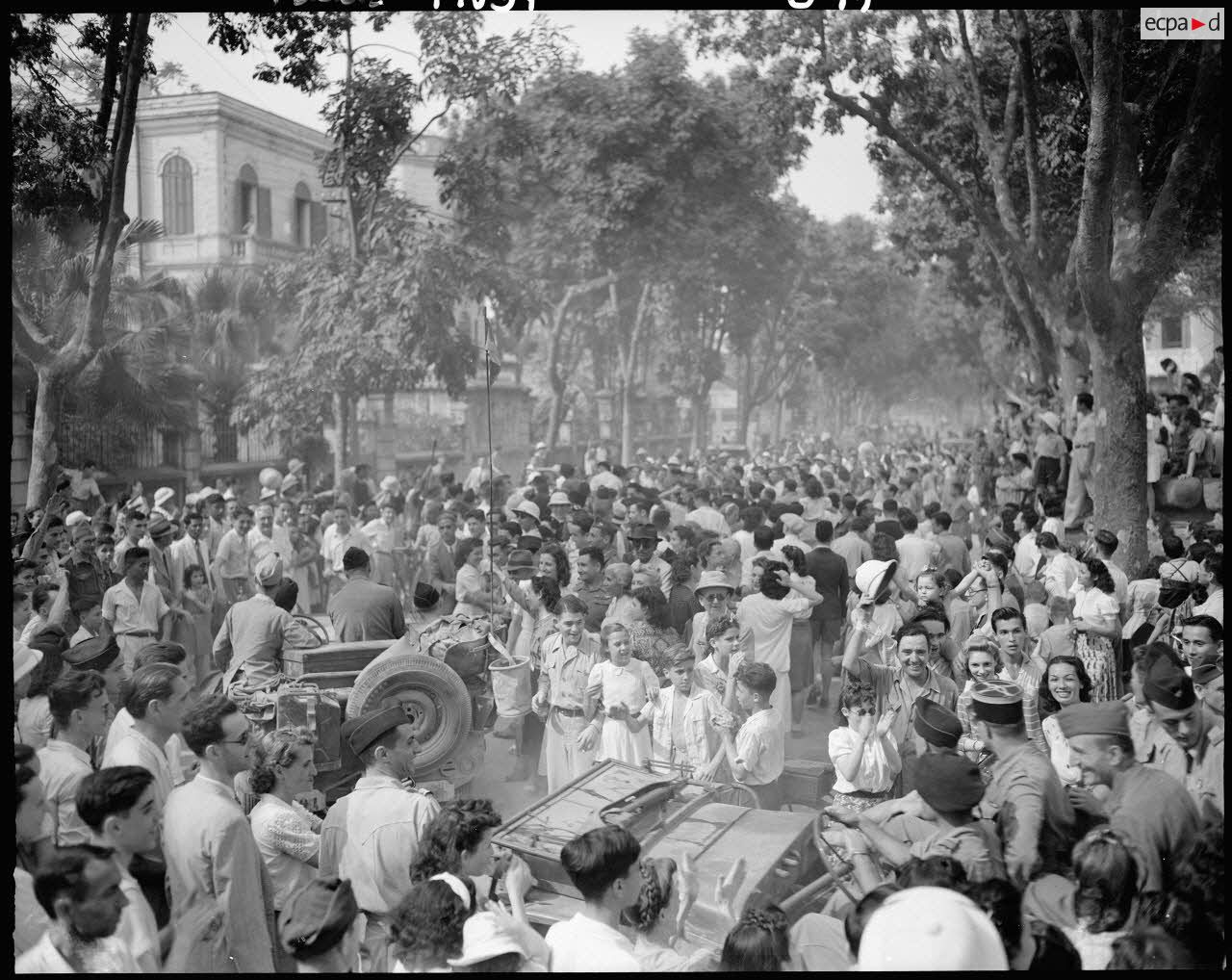
French residents of Indochina burst with joy at the return of French troops to Hanoi on 18 March 1946.

The Ho–Sainteny Agreement, officially the Accords between France and the Democratic Republic of Vietnam, known in Vietnamese as Hiệp định sơ bộ Pháp–Việt and in French as Convention préliminaire, was a preliminary treaty signed to initially confirm Vietnam's membership within the French Union on 6 March 1946, between Hồ Chí Minh, President of the Democratic Republic of Vietnam (DRV), and Jean Sainteny, French commissioner north of the 16th parallel of Indochina. Hồ was also leader of the Viet Minh, the organization de facto leading the DRV. Before that, on 24 March 1945, in its declaration, France planned a major democratic reform of its colonial rule in Indochina (including Vietnam) to make here a neo-colony, based on the Brazzaville Conference of Free France in February 1944. The first official use of the term "French Union" appeared in this declaration. Initially the DRV was not recognized by any country, while French sovereignty over Indochina was recognized by the victorious Allies.

After the Potsdam Conference, Indochina was divided along the 16th parallel to allow the Allies to enter and disarm the Japanese army; the Chinese took responsibility for the North. This agreement was seen as necessary for the Viet Minh because China had allowed the French army to advance Indochina north of the 16th parallel in February. Before that, the French army returned to the South with British help and Allied recognition. Franco-British coalition had conflicts with the Vietnamese factions (including Viet Minh) and won. Negotiations between France and the Viet Minh started with the agreement. It was effective north of the 16th parallel of Vietnam and came into force right after signing. It recognized Vietnam as a free state within the French Union and Indochinese Federation, and permitted France to continue stationing troops in Vietnam north of the 16th parallel. France agreed to hold a referendum in Cochinchina on reunification with Vietnam.

However, the French Union was only established on 27 October 1946 with the new French constitution. Before an official treaty could take effect, Vietnam was still French protectorates including Tonkin (Northern Vietnam) and Annam (Central Vietnam) while Cochinchina (Southern Vietnam) was still directly ruled by France. Although the agreement was also signed by another member of the Vietnamese government, Vũ Hồng Khanh, leader of the Việt Nam Quốc Dân Đảng and Vice Chairman of the Resistance Committee; the agreement was strongly attacked by non-Viet Minh opposition groups. Meanwhile, the French High Commissioner in Indochina, Georges Thierry d'Argenlieu, criticized the agreement for being soft on the Viet Minh. Subsequent negotiations between the two sides broke down due to the hardline attitudes of both sides, leading to the First Indochina War between them on 19 December 1946.

== Content ==
Here is full text of the treaty:

PRELIMINARY AGREEMENT

On one side is the Government of the French Republic, represented by Mr. Sainteny, who is officially authorized by Admiral George Thierry d'Argenlieu, the French High Commissioner, authorized by the Government of the French Republic.

On one side is the Government of the Democratic Republic of Vietnam represented by President Ho Chi Minh and special commissioner of the Council of Ministers, Mr. Vu Hong Khanh.

The two parties have agreed on the following terms:

1) The French Government recognizes the Democratic Republic of Vietnam as a free state with its own Government, Parliament, army, and finances, and as a member of the Indochinese Federation within the French Union. Regarding the unification of the three regions, the French Government undertakes to recognize the decisions of the people directly.

2) The Government of Vietnam declares its readiness to amicably welcome the French army when it comes, in accordance with international agreements, to replace the Chinese army. An annex to this Preliminary Agreement will specify the manner in which this replacement will be carried out.

3) The above provisions shall be put into effect immediately. After the signing of the agreement, the two Governments shall immediately decide on all necessary measures to bring the hostilities to an immediate end, to maintain the troops in their present positions and to create the atmosphere of calm necessary for the immediate opening of friendly and sincere negotiations. These negotiations shall deal with:

a) Vietnam's diplomatic relations with foreign countries.

b) The future regime of Indochina.

c) French economic and cultural interests in Vietnam.

The cities of Hanoi, Saigon, and Paris can be chosen as the conference venues.

APPENDIX

Pursuant to the Preliminary Agreement between the Government of the French Republic and the Government of Vietnam, the two Governments mentioned in the Preliminary Agreement have agreed on the following provisions:

1) The military forces that will replace the Chinese army will include:

a) 10,000 Vietnamese troops with Vietnamese officers under the command of Vietnamese military authorities.

b) 15,000 French troops, including the French soldiers currently stationed in Vietnam north of the 16th parallel. Those 15,000 French soldiers had to be genuine French, except for the troops in charge of guarding Japanese prisoners of war. The total of the above forces will be placed under the command of the French Commander with the collaboration of Vietnamese troops. Once the French troops have landed, a Staff Conference consisting of representatives of the French High Command and the Vietnamese High Command will determine the progress, introduction, and employment of the French troops and the aforementioned Vietnamese troops. Franco-Vietnamese Military Affairs Committees will be established at all military levels to liaise between French and Vietnamese soldiers in a spirit of friendly cooperation.

2) The French troops used to replace the Chinese army will be divided into 3 categories:

a) The teams in charge of guarding Japanese prisoners of war: these teams will withdraw to France as soon as their task is completed, that is, after the Japanese prisoners of war have been taken out of this country; in any case, this period must not exceed 10 months.

b) The troops, together with the Vietnamese army, are responsible for the police and defense of Vietnam: every year, one-fifth (1/5) of the troops will return to France to be replaced by the Vietnamese army. So in 5 years, the Vietnamese army will replace all of these French troops.

c) Troops in charge of defending naval and air bases: the duration of the tasks assigned to these troops will be decided by subsequent conferences.

3) In the garrisons where French and Vietnamese troops are stationed, separate areas for both sides will be clearly defined.

4) The French Government pledges not to use Japanese prisoners of war for military purposes.

== Post-accords ==
After this agreement took effect, the French army in Indochina led by General Philippe Leclerc de Hauteclocque entered Hanoi on 18 March 1946. He favored a moderate solution. During the time, many French and American politicians were willing to believe that Ho was part of a Soviet plan to dominate the world, but Leclerc warned that "anti-communism will be a useless tool unless the problem of nationalism is resolved." His advice was simple: "Negotiate at all costs!" Realizing that France would lose the war, he even recommended that the French should grant independence to Vietnam in the worst case in order to keep Vietnam within the French Union to ensure French economic and cultural interests. At the time, French right-wing supported keeping Indochina. The Ho-Sainteny agreement was never confirmed because it disappointed people on both sides. Ho's immense prestige largely silenced Vietnamese dissent, but the agreement caused a serious split within the French side. French businessmen, planters, and officials in Saigon were "indignant at the prospect of losing their colonial privileges." On March 24, the French High Commissioner in Indochina Georges Thierry d'Argenlieu invited President Ho Chi Minh to hold talks in Ha Long Bay to discuss and agree on issues before holding a preparatory conference in Da Lat on the condition that French delegation must be sent by the Government from France. A preliminary conference on the future of Vietnam was held in April in Da Lat but failed due to the tough stance of both: the disagreement was particularly acute regarding the status of Cochinchina. Ho Chi Minh relied primarily on an official conference to be held in the Paris area that both sides agreed with Vietnamese delegation led by Phạm Văn Đồng. Shortly before leaving and with the aim of expanding his fighting base, he founded the Liên Việt, an alliance that was supposed to bring together all nationalists and, although de facto dominated by the Viet Minh, drew on members of other groups such as the Việt Nam Quốc Dân Đảng (VNQDĐ). A conference was held from 6 July to September in Fontainebleau (France). The two sides harshly argued about Vietnam's status within the French Union and the Indochinese Federation as well as Cochinchinese future, with many aspects. Neither side was willing to compromise at the negotiating table. At the meetings, Ho Chi Minh's delegation pushed for Vietnamese independence but the French would not agree to this proposal. France only accepted Vietnam's autonomy or "independence" within the unequal framework of the French Union. The most controversial issue was Cochinchina (not part of Vietnam) when France established an autonomous republic led by Nguyễn Văn Thinh there by d'Argenlieu on June 1 while the manner and timing of holding a referendum on its future were not specified by France in the conference. On June 3, 1946, Thinh and the French commissioner south of the 16th parallel of Indochina, Cédille, signed the Saigon preliminary treaty recognizing Cochinchina as a free state within the Indochinese Federation and the French Union. The Viet Minh, a de facto communist-dominated political alliance, carried out a campaign of repression against nationalists and Trotskyites from August 1945. The Viet Minh de facto led the Democratic Republic of Vietnam (DRV), self-proclaimed on 2 September 1945. In North Vietnam, after the complete withdrawal of Chinese troops in June 1946, the Viet Minh with French support intensified its repression of pro-Chinese nationalist factions although Kuomintang's China had previously pressured the Viet Minh to share power in the parliament and government with the pro-Chinese Việt Cách and VNQDĐ. China also received a bribe of gold from the Viet Minh, so it gave Japanese weapons to the Viet Minh. The coalition government in Vietnam collapsed. Meanwhile, in July 1946, Jean Valluy replaced Philippe Leclerc de Hauteclocque.

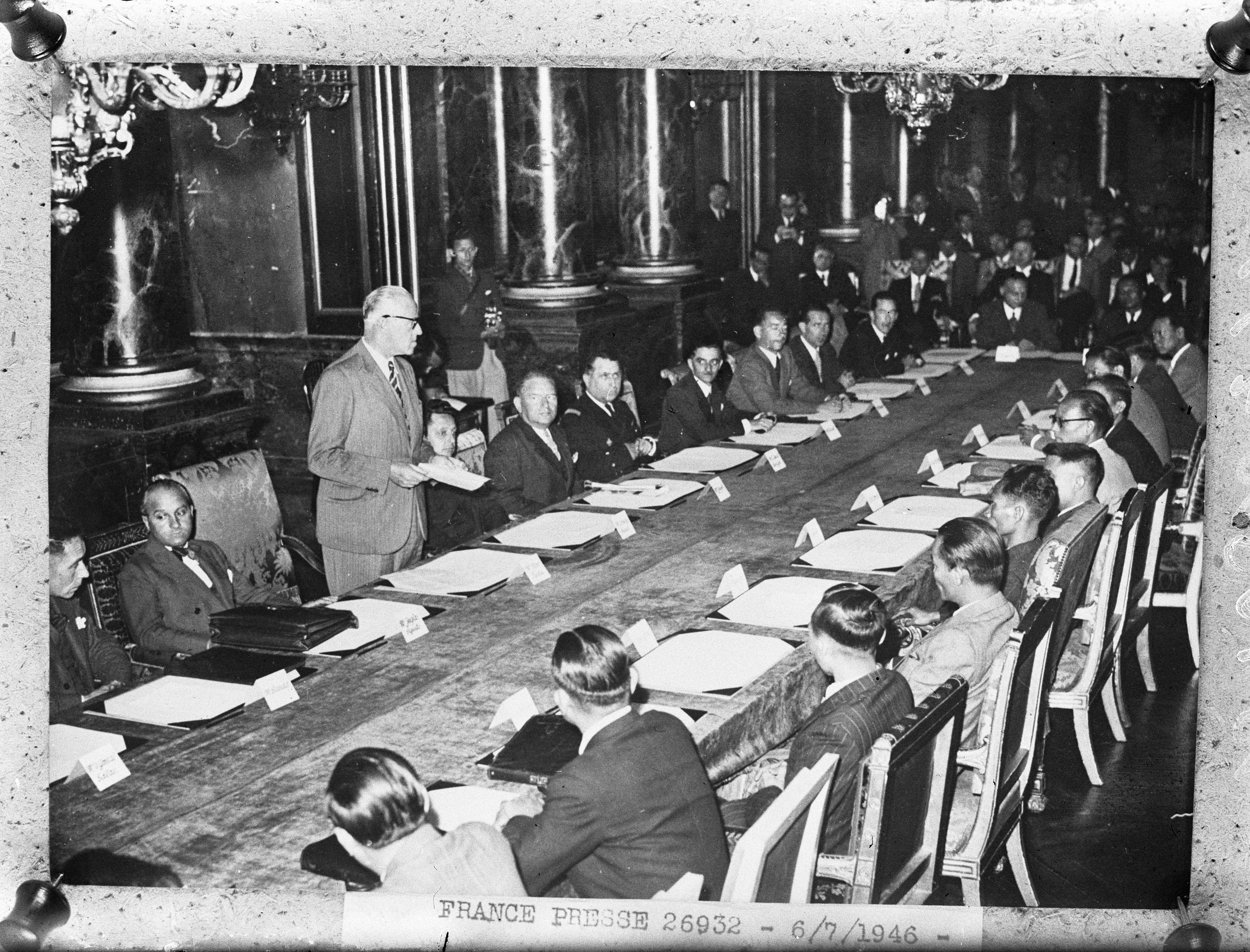
First day of the Fontainebleau Conference, July 6, 1946.

Despite the failure of the conference, Ho Chi Minh extended his stay in France: on 15 September he signed a hastily drafted modus vivendi with the French Minister of Overseas Affairs, Marius Moutet (de jure September 14), which included a provision for resuming negotiations in January 1947 after the constitution of the Fourth Republic had been adopted and the status of the French Union had been clarified. Politically, France had not yet recognized Vietnam as an independent and unified state, and the Viet Minh had recognized Vietnamese economic and cultural interests. The treaty provided for a ceasefire south of the 16th parallel and came into effect on 30 October. On 27 October 1946, the French Constitution was promulgated, leading to the official establishment of the French Fourth Republic and its French Union. In Cochinchina, in the final weeks before the ceasefire south of the 16th parallel, the Viet Minh began organizing military attacks on My Tho, southwest of Saigon. By the end of October, the Viet Minh effectively controlled three-quarters of Cochinchina. In the north of the 16th parallel, sporadic clashes broke out due to the hardline Viet Minh. Fighting broke out in Bac Ninh from 2–4 August, starting with a clash between a French convoy and a Viet Minh guard post (the Viet Minh claimed that the French did not accept their control), leading to French reinforcements and air strikes to capture Bac Ninh town. In Lang Son, a group of French troops searching for the graves of French soldiers in the war against Japan was attacked by the Viet Minh. The French immediately counterattacked and captured Lang Son on 24 November 1946.

French High Commissioner in Indochina Georges Thierry d'Argenlieu and head of French troops in Indochina Jean Valluy (right-wing generals) also wanted to take advantage of tensions to be against the Viet Minh. In Haiphong (Tonkin), the French wanted to control the customs. The reason the French wanted to control the customs was because the Viet Minh were organizing the purchase of weapons from China there. On the morning of November 20, 1946, a French patrol boat seized a Chinese junk attempting to smuggle contraband into Haiphong. Although seemingly trivial, this seizure marked the beginning of a series of unfortunate events. Vietnamese soldiers responded by firing on the French ship from the shore, killing 23 soldiers. The French army, commanded by Colonel Dèbes, retaliated; the ensuing clashes caused dozens of casualties. General Valluy, who was acting in d'Argenlieu's absence, ordered Dèbes to take control of the city. The French used the pretext of protecting the Chinese under the treaty signed with China in February 1946 to demand that the Viet Minh army withdraw from Hai Phong, but the Viet Minh refused. On November 23, 1946, the French army bombarded Hai Phong and a fierce battle took place between the French and the Viet Minh. On December 2, the French army controlled Hai Phong. Jean Sainteny was reappointed as French commissioner north of the 16th parallel of Indochina and returned to Hanoi on December 3. Negotiations were held to ease tensions, but the Viet Minh continued to prepare for war. Grasping General Valluy's directive to the French army in the North, the Viet Minh mobilized the army and erected barricades in Hanoi as a precaution in case of attack by the French army along the Hanoi-Hai Phong route, these even encroached on the French residential area, hindering French movement. The French army was also forced to camp as a precaution in case of attack by the Viet Minh. On December 17, the French massacred civilians in Hang Bun. The French launched a campaign to clear barricades, and sporadic clashes between the two sides, initiated by the Viet Minh, forced the French to issue an ultimatum on December 18, 1946, demanding the Viet Minh disarm so that France could maintain security in the city from December 20. Right-wing but moderate French figure Jean Sainteny was also injured by Viet Minh's attacks on December 19. French request directly led to the war when the Viet Minh attacked the French in Hanoi on the evening of December 19 and its government withdrew from Hanoi. In February 1947, Hanoi was captured by the French.

After the French legislative elections in November 1946, the left-wing coalition of the French Section of the Workers' International (SFIO) and the French Communist Party (PCF) won against the right-wing Popular Republican Movement (MRP). Vincent Auriol was elected President of the National Assembly and Provisional President of France by the French National Assembly, who then appointed Léon Blum (a leftist) as Prime Minister of France, and Blum took office on 16 December, just before the outbreak of war. The left tended to support national self-determination. Blum favored the plans for the French Union, the French version of the Commonwealth under which the various colonies of France would be granted the equivalent of Dominion status within the British Empire. However, Algeria was not included because legally it was an internal part of France. After learning that Léon Blum would become the new Prime Minister of France, President Ho Chi Minh sent him a message reiterating the basic position of the Vietnamese government and proposing some specific measures to break the deadlock. However, this telegram was kept by the French military command in Saigon and was not sent to Paris (capital of France) until December 26, 1946. After the war broke out, the French prime minister sent two inspection delegations to Vietnam to survey the situation.

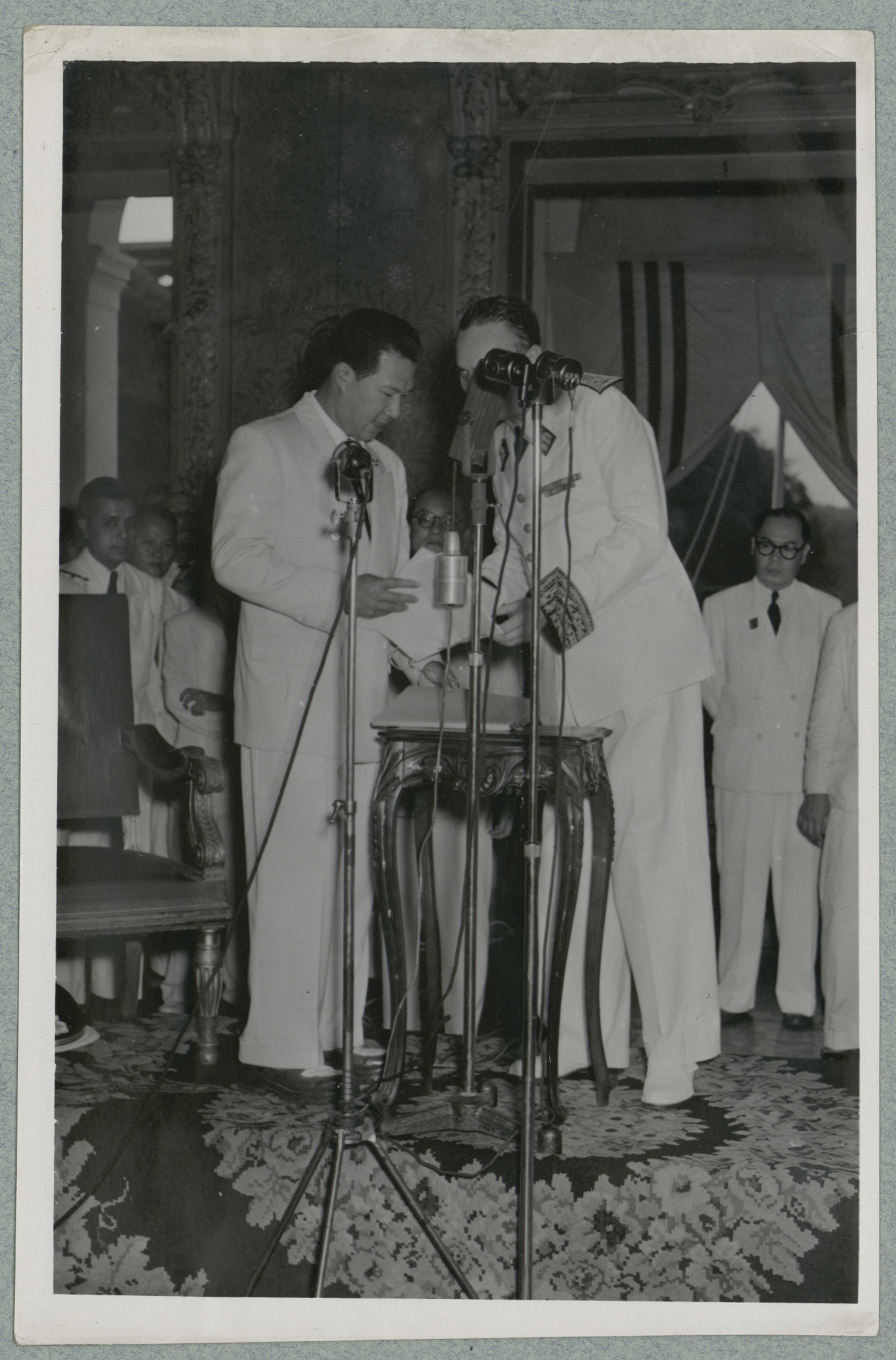
Vietnamese former emperor Bảo Đại and the French High Commissioner in Indochina Léon Pignon exchanged letters at City Hall in Saigon on 14 June 1949, leading to the Élysée Accords taking effect.

After the French left-wing politician Paul Ramadier came to power in January 1947, he removed d'Argenlieu from office and replaced this general with a more moderate High Commissioner in March, a civil officer, Émile Bollaert. He also accepted the use of the word "independence" for Vietnam. However, later the communist Viet Minh refused to surrender to France in May so France decided to move to negotiations with anti-communist nationalists led by former Vietnamese emperor Bảo Đại and supported by the United States. Bảo Đại served as Supreme Advisor to the DRV government after abdication but was later asked by the communists to stay in China. The nationalists favored a moderate approach and they reluctantly cooperated with France to fight communism and regain sovereignty for Vietnam peacefully in a Western-style democracy. In late 1946, before the war broke out between France and the communist Viet Minh, exiled leaders of the Việt Cách and the VNQDĐ in China (Nguyễn Hải Thần, Vũ Hồng Khanh, Nguyễn Tường Tam), went to Hong Kong to meet Bảo Đại and advise him to return to power. They were followed by a series of other Vietnamese nationalists. D'Argenlieu also agreed to the idea of restoring the throne to Bao Dai after the war broke out. Previously, France of Charles de Gaulle had intended to restore power to the former Vietnamese emperor Duy Tan, a relative of Bao Dai who had served the Free French, Duy Tan agreed but he died in a plane crash in December 1945. A coalition of Vietnamese anti-communist nationalists formed a National Union to support Bảo Đại in Nanjing (China) on 17 February 1947 and was later quickly expanded, Ngô Đình Diệm also joined it after expansion.

Initially being neutral, Bảo Đại finally accepted negotiations with the French under the name of "Emperor" on 18 September 1947. Although the war between the Viet Minh and France broke out in late 1946, legally the agreement on March between them was still valid until the Hạ Long Bay preliminary treaty on 7 December 1947 between French High Commissioner in Indochina Émile Bollaert and Vietnamese "emperor" Bảo Đại representing native anti-communist nationalists. On 23 May 1948, the Provisional Central Government of Vietnam led by Cochinchinese leader Nguyễn Văn Xuân and representing native nationalists was formed. Another Hạ Long Bay preliminary treaty was signed between Bollaert and Xuân, under the witness of Bảo Đại and representatives of three Vietnamese regions, on June 5. The "independent" and unified State of Vietnam (predecessor of the Republic of Vietnam) within the French Union was established on 14 June 1949 when the Élysée Accords, an official treaty including three letters signed between Bảo Đại and French President Vincent Auriol in March, took effect. Cochinchina returned to Vietnam after some legal procedures. The new state was led by former emperor Bảo Đại. Despite the communists opposing the accords, these ended the unequal treaties that France signed with Vietnam under the Nguyen dynasty in the 19th century. However, that was not a full independence and the process of empowerment only took place gradually through subsequent negotiations. (Note: Vietnam gained full independence within the French Union on 4 June 1954 although the process of devolution continued even after Vietnam was divided at 17th parallel in July with the State of Vietnam losing the North. On 30 December 1954, the Indochinese Federation was dissolved after a conference and various treaties signed. The Republic of Vietnam (successor of the State of Vietnam) withdrew from the French Union's Assembly and terminated its economic and financial agreements with France in December 1955. The French army withdrew from South Vietnam in April 1956 due to requests of native government.) Ngô Đình Diệm opposed the Élysée Accords because Vietnam did not gain full independence with this agreement. It was ratified by the French Parliament on 29 January 1950 and by the French President on February 2. After communist victory in China in late 1949, Communist China and the USSR recognized the DRV on 18 and 30 January 1950 respectively, leading to the Viet Minh openly declaring itself communist. In the context of the Cold War, the US recognized the State of Vietnam as a response on February 7. In the First Indochina War between the DRV and France, from 1950, China supported the DRV and the US supported the French. China strongly strengthened the power of Viet Minh. In December 1950, the State of Vietnam established its own army. While American military aid for Vietnam still had to go through France, the US started to provide direct economic aid to Vietnam with a treaty between the two countries on 7 September 1951.

== See also ==
- Fontainebleau Agreements
- Élysée Accords
- 1954 Geneva Conference
- Paris Peace Accords

== Sources ==
- Cartier, Emmanuel (December 2005). La transition constitutionnelle en France 1940-1945 (thesis). Bibliothèque constitutionnelle et de science politique 126 (in French) (1 ed.). Paris: LGDJ. ISBN 2-275-02674-6. OCLC 470417840.
- Colton, Joel (1966). Leon Blum: Humanist in Politics. Knopf Doubleday Publishing Group. ISBN 978-0-307-83089-0. LCCN 65-18768. OCLC 265833.
- Goscha, Christopher E. (2011). "Accords of 6 March 1946". Historical Dictionary of the Indochina War (1945–1954): An International and Interdisciplinary Approach. NIAS Press. ISBN 9788776940638.
- Karnow, Stanley (1983). Vietnam: A History. New York: Viking Press. ISBN 0-670-74604-5. OCLC 9646422.
- Miclo, François (1982). Le régime législatif des départements d'outre-mer et l'unité de la République. Droit public positif (in French) (1 ed.). Paris: Economica. ISBN 2-7178-0583-4. OCLC 465377212.
- Moore, William Mortimer (2011). Free France's Lion: The Life of Philippe Leclerc, De Gaulle's Greatest General. Newbury, Nerkshire: Casemate Publishers. ISBN 978-1-61200-068-8. OCLC 721889914.
- Sander, Éric (31 October 2017). "La situation du droit local alsacien-mosellan au début du XXI" [The situation of the Alsatian-Moselle local law at the beginning of the 21st century]. In Lienhard, Alain; Pérochon, Françoise; Rontchevsky, Nicolas; Roussel-Galle, Philippe; Storck, Michel (eds.). Mélanges en l'honneur de Jean-Luc Vallens (in French) (1 ed.). Issy-les-Moulineaux: Joly, hors coll. pp. 273–290. ISBN 978-2-306-00083-0. OCLC 1010744224.
