= Élysée Accords =

1949 agreement between France and Vietnam

The Élysée Accords were an agreement signed at the Élysée Palace on 8 March 1949 by ex-emperor of the Nguyễn dynasty, Bảo Đại, which gave the State of Vietnam greater independence from France within the French Union.

The Accords received final ratification by the French National Assembly on 29 January 1950, and were signed by French President Vincent Auriol on 2 February. The agreement was intended to increase U.S. support for France's actions in Indochina as well as to convince Bảo Đại that France would give Vietnam greater independence. The Accords stated that Vietnam could conduct its own foreign affairs, control its finances and have an army; although, the agreements fell short of granting complete independence.

The agreements led to the U.S. moving from a position of neutrality to supporting Bảo Đại. The French portrayed their actions in Indochina as fighting the communism of Hồ Chí Minh while attempting to regain control of their colonies after World War II.

== Content ==
The agreement was compared to the British Commonwealth of Nations, though fell short in many aspects. Vietnam was empowered to control its own finances and the path was paved for the creation of the Vietnamese National Army. Vietnam was granted the right to appoint diplomats to China, Thailand, and the Vatican City, whilst the remainder of Vietnamese foreign policy remained under French control.

== Effects ==
Whilst intending to prevent further nationalist sentiment, the Élysée Accords had the opposite effect - showing Vietnamese nationalists that the French were unwilling to compromise their interests in Indochina. Ngo Dinh Diem rejected an offer of Prime Minister in the new Vietnam, saying "the national aspirations of the Vietnamese people will be satisfied only when our nation obtains the same status India and Pakistan enjoy".

On 22 July 1949, the United States State Department declared that the Elysée Accords were developments that realized the aspirations of the Vietnamese people, though the US did not immediately recognize the new state, much to the disappointment of France. US support in South Vietnam grew steadily in 1949 and 1950 and with the loss of China in October 1949 and the recognition of the Democratic Republic of Vietnam by the Soviet Union in January 1950, the United States eventually recognized the Bảo Đại government in February and granted $15 million in military aid.

== See also ==
- Fontainebleau Agreements
- 1954 Geneva Conference
- Viet Minh
