= Thanh Phong =

- Commune
- Interactive map of Thanh Phong
- Coordinates: 19°34′57″N 105°19′14″E
- Country: Vietnam
- Region: North Central Coast
- Province: Thanh Hóa
- Established: 16 June 2025
- Administrative headquarters: Tân Hiệp Hamlet

Area
  - Total: 150.21 km^{2} (58.00 sq mi)

Population (2024)
  - Total: 9,619
  - Density: 64/km^{2} (170/sq mi)
- Postal code: 42516
- Website: thanhphong.thanhhoa.gov.vn

Thanh Phong is a commune in Thanh Hóa province, Vietnam.

On 16 June 2025, Như Xuân district was dissolved as part of the 2025 Vietnamese administrative reform, which abolished the district-level administrative system. Thanh Phong Commune was established under Resolution No. 1686/NQ-UBTVQH15 of the Standing Committee of the National Assembly of Vietnam, through the merger of the entire area and population of Thanh Hòa, Thanh Lâm, and Thanh Phong communes. The commune officially began operating on 1 July 2025 as an administrative unit directly under Thanh Hóa province.

Thanh Phong was originally established as a commune of Như Xuân district in 1964.
