= Fontainebleau Agreements =

Conference between France and the Viet Minh, 1946

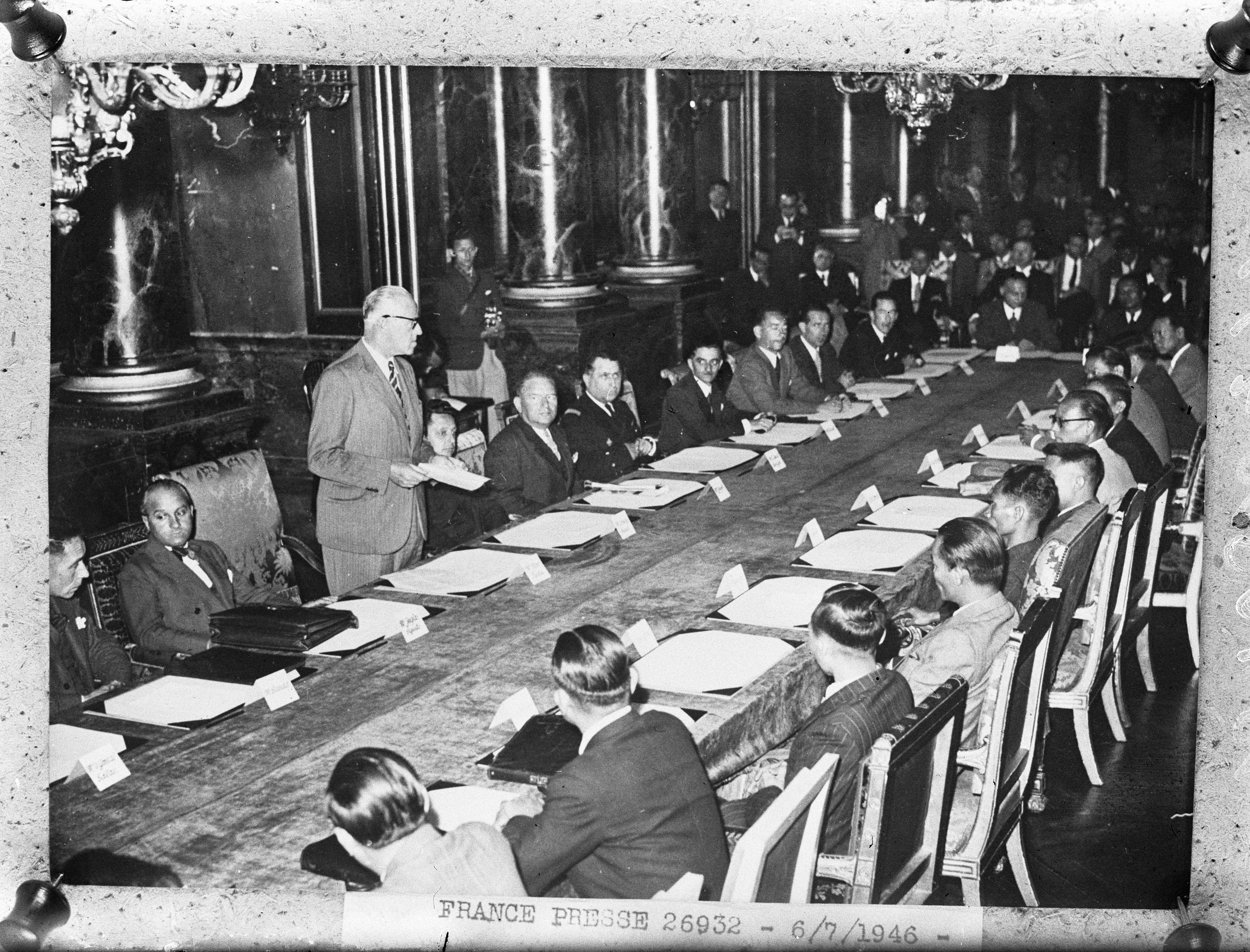
First day of the Fontainebleau Conference, July 6, 1946.

The Fontainebleau Agreements were a proposed arrangement between the France and the Viet Minh, made in 1946 before the outbreak of the First Indochina War. The agreements affiliated Vietnam under the French Union. At the meetings, Ho Chi Minh pushed for Vietnamese independence but the French would not agree to this proposal. Negotiations on the future of Vietnam and Cochinchina between the two sides failed, leading to Ho Chi Minh having to sign a modus vivendi with France to make further concessions to salvage the situation on September 15 (nominally the 14th).

When visiting Marseille, instead of the warm welcome when Ho Chi Minh first arrived in France, overseas Vietnamese protested and called him a "traitor" (Việt gian). While the Viet Minh's regime made a constitution without reference to the French Union in November, the latter attempted to regain control of French Indochina. Generally the tough stance of both sides led to the First Indochina War between them on December 19.

== See also ==
- Élysée Accords – 1949 agreement between France and Vietnam
- Ho–Sainteny Agreement
