= Émile Bollaert =

French politician (1890–1978)

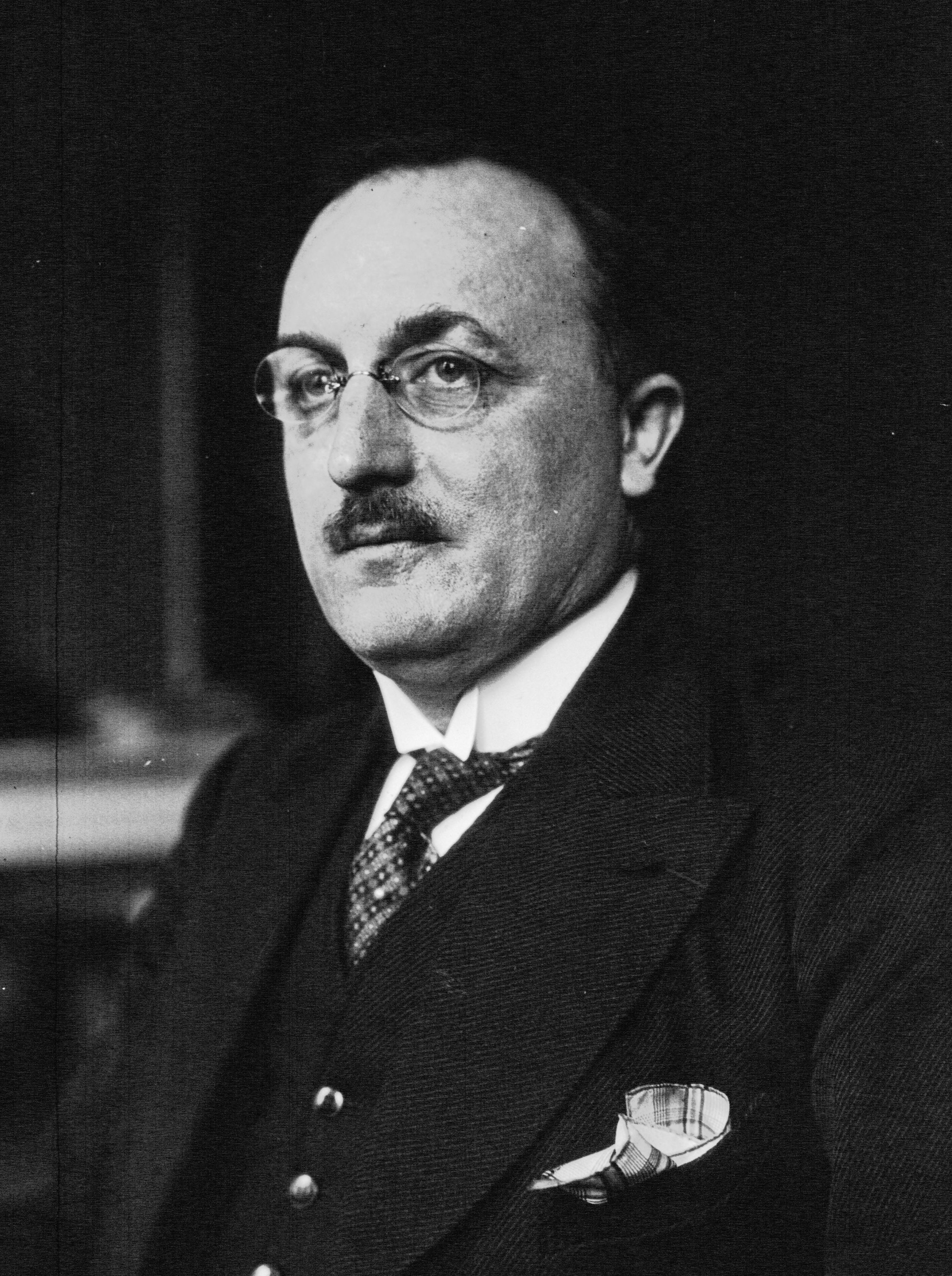

High Commissioner of Indochina
- In office 5 March 1947 – 19 October 1948
- President: Vincent Auriol
- Preceded by: Georges Thierry d'Argenlieu
- Succeeded by: Léon Pignon

Personal details
- Born: 13 November 1890 Dunkirk, France
- Died: 18 May 1978 (aged 87) Paris, France

Émile Bollaert (13 November 1890 – 18 May 1978) was French High Commissioner of Indochina from 5 March 1947 to 19 October 1948.

He was one of the senators elected by the National Assembly who held office during the French Fourth Republic.
