= PZM-2 =

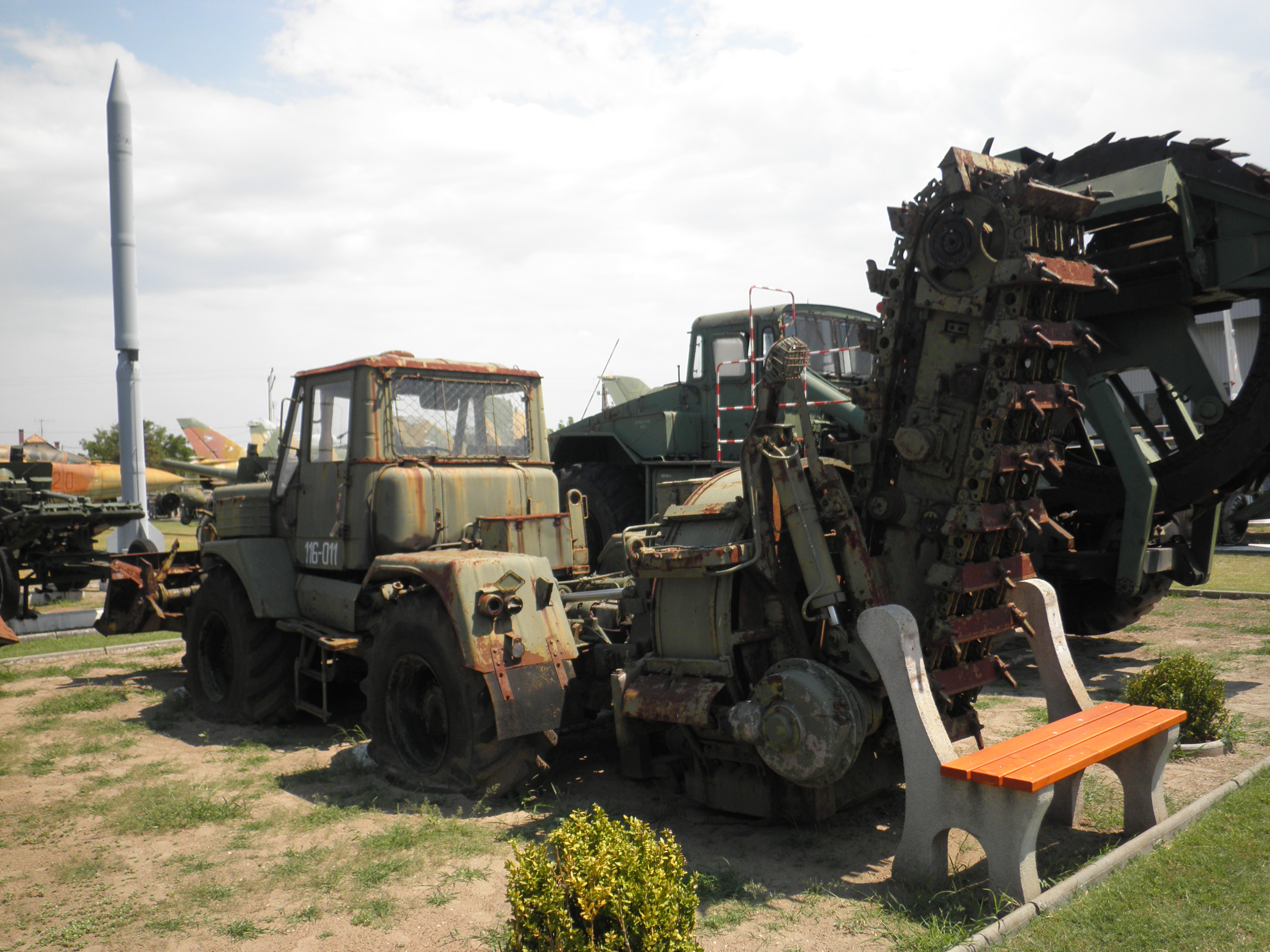
- PZM-2 regimental trench-digging machine in Army History Museum and Park in Kecel, Hungary
- Type: Trencher
- Place of origin: Soviet Union

Service history
- In service: 1968–present (some countries)

Production history
- Manufacturer: Kharkiv Tractor Plant

Specifications
- Mass: 12.8 tonnes
- Length: 6.99 m
- Width: 2.55 m
- Height: 3.8 m
- Crew: 2
- Engine: SZMD–62 turbocharged diesel engine 165 hp (123 kW)
- Transmission: Six forward and two reverse gears, with an additional six slower gears for digging
- Operational range: 500 km
- Maximum speed: 45 km/h

PZM-2 (Russian: Полковая Землеройная Машина — 2-я модель, lit. 'Regimental Trench-Digging/Earthmoving Machine — 2nd Model') is a Soviet engineering vehicle for digging trenches, small pits, laying canals, filling them and other earthworks.

== History ==
The PZM-2 was created in the USSR in the 1960s for the engineering troops of the Soviet Armed Forces, but found wide application in the civilian sector. The machine is mounted on the chassis of the T-155 light artillery tractor, created on the basis of the T-150K agricultural wheeled tractor of the Kharkiv Tractor Plant. The working unit PZM-2 is a bar chain organ. In addition, there is auxiliary bulldozer equipment and a winch. In frozen soils, the machine ensures the excavation of trenches only.

In 2013, one PZM-2 earthmoving machine was modernized in Ukraine, receiving a modernized hydraulic system.

== Technical specifications ==
The vehicle is powered by a 165 horsepower (123 kW) SZMD-62 turbocharged diesel engine. The transmission has six forward and two reverse gears, with an additional six slower gears for digging. To achieve sufficient traction, the vehicle was also equipped with a 5,000 kg hydromechanically driven winch, which was located at the front of the machine. The PZM-2 has a roller chain on which there are digging buckets, and it is driven mechanically by the main tractor engine. A sliding plate is attached to the front of the vehicle. This is used to prepare the site of the trench or, traditionally, for earthmoving and dozer and soil leveling tasks.

All the mentioned activities can be performed in any climatic conditions in the temperature range from −40 ºС to + 40 ºС.

- Technical performance when digging trenches, m3/h — 140
  - In thawed soils - 180
  - In frozen soils - 35
- Maximum transport speed, km/h — 45
- Average transport speed, km/h — 20 — 25
- Operational range, km — 500
- Fireteam, people - 2
- Machine preparation time for work, min — 3 — 4
- Length, m — 6.99
- Width, m — 2.55
- Height, m — 3.8
- Weight, t — 12.8
- Fuel consumption, l:
  - Per 100 km of the road - 55
  - For 1 engine hour of work - 24
- Dimensions of the excavated pit, m:
  - Depth - 3
  - Bottom width - 2 - 3.5
  - Top width - 2 - 3.5
- Dimensions of the excavated trench, m:
  - Maximum depth - 1.2
  - Top width - 0.9
  - Bottom width - 0.6

== Variants ==
- PZM-2VDV (Regimental Earthmoving Machine - 2nd model, airborne troops) - with the ability to land, for digging trenches and pits, filling them, creating descents and other earthworks.
- PZM-2M is a modernization option proposed by the Kiev company OOO NPK Tekhimpex.

== Operators ==
- Belarus
- Egypt: 48, bought from Ukraine after the collapse of the Soviet Union.
- Moldova
- Russia
- Soviet Union: adopted into service in 1968.
- Ukraine
- Vietnam
