= Marie Oyon =

French politician

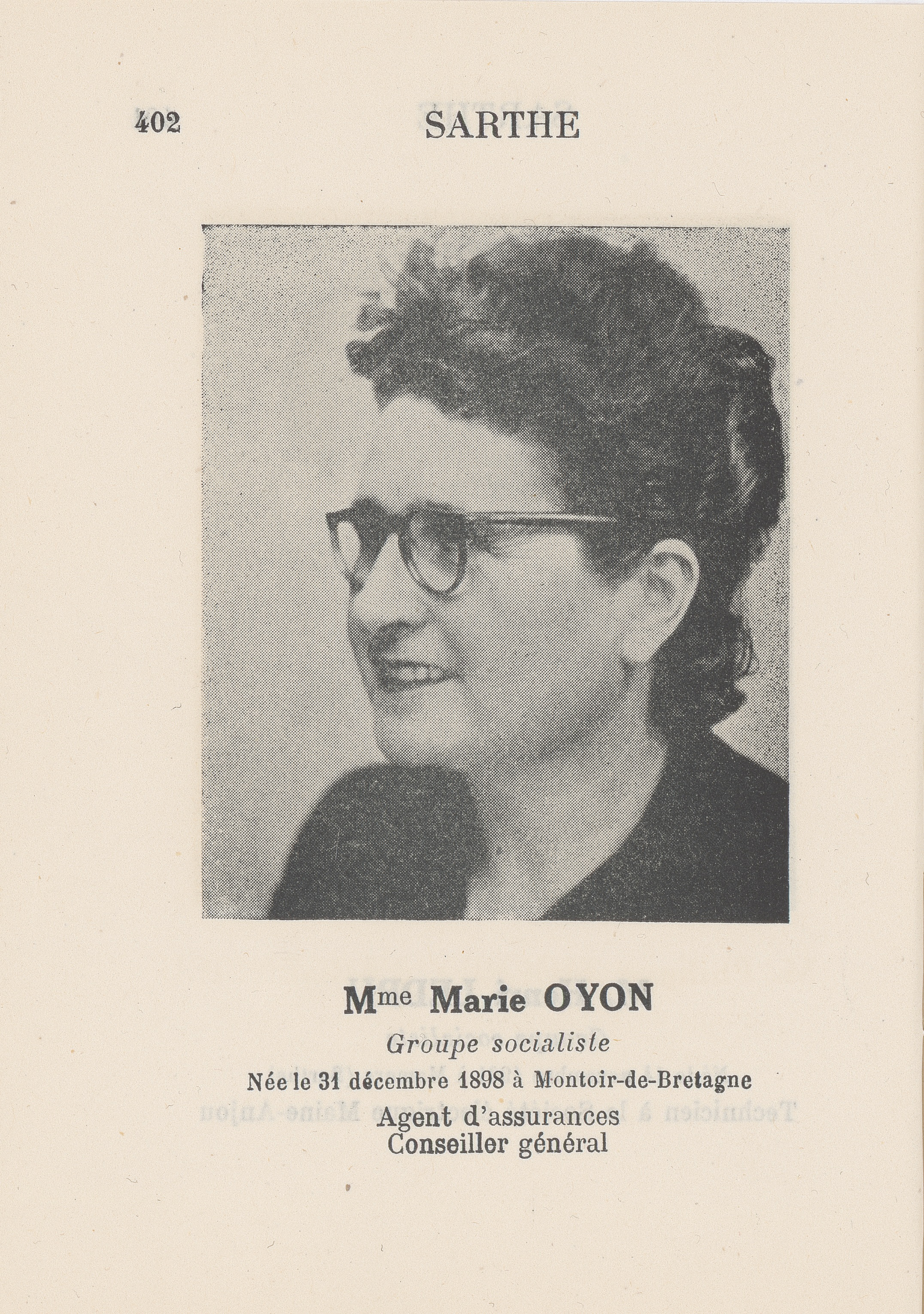

Member of the National Assembly
- In office 1945–1946
- Constituency: Sarthe

Member of the Council of the Republic
- In office 1946–1948

Personal details
- Born: 31 December 1898 Montoir-de-Bretagne, France
- Died: 11 October 1969 (aged 70) Le Mans, France

Marie Oyon (31 December 1898 – 11 October 1969) was a French politician. She was elected to the National Assembly in October 1945 as one of the first group of French women in parliament. She served in the National Assembly until June the following year, and then a member of the Council of the Republic until 1948.

== Biography ==
Oyon was born in Montoir-de-Bretagne in 1898. Orphaned at a young age, she trained to be a shorthand typist. She moved to Sarthe to find work, where she met Alexandre Oyon, an insurer from Le Mans. The couple married and had two children. Alexandre became deputy mayor of the city in 1935, while Oyon set up a secular home school in the working class Abattoirs-Batignoles district. During the Nazi occupation, the couple participated in the French resistance. They were arrested by the gestapo in 1944. Initially imprisoned in Archives and the Fort de Romainville, Marie was later sent to Ravensbrück concentration camp in Germany, while Alexandre was sent to Amsterdam, where he died.

After the war, Oyon returned to France and was elected to the General Council of Le Mans. She was subsequently a French Section of the Workers' International (SFIO) candidate in Sarthe department in the October 1945 National Assembly elections and was elected to parliament, becoming one of the first group of women in the National Assembly. Although she lost her seat in the June 1946 elections, in December 1946 she was elected to the Council of the Republic by members of the National Assembly. Still suffering from her time in Ravensbrück, she did not stand for re-election in 1948. She died in Le Mans in 1969.
