= Marcel Willard =

French lawyer and politician

- Born: 25 July 1889; Paris, France
- Died: 17 February 1956 (aged 66); Paris, France
- Occupations: Lawyer, politician
- Political party: French Communist Party
- Spouse: Germaine Willard

Marcel Willard (25 July 1889 – 17 February 1956) was a French lawyer and politician. He served in the French Army during World War I, and was awarded the Croix de Guerre for it. He earned a bachelor of laws and began his career as a lawyer. He then served in the French Resistance during World War II, and was awarded the Croix de Guerre a second time, and Resistance Medal, and made an officer of the Legion of Honour after the war. He served as a Communist member of the French Senate from 1946 to 1948.
