= Đàm Quang Trung =

Vietnamese general (1921–1995)

Colonel General Đàm Quang Trung

Vice President of Vietnam
- In office 1987–1992
- President: Võ Chí Công

Personal details
- Born: Đàm Ngọc Lưu; 12 September 1921 Hà Quảng, Cao Bằng, French Tonkin
- Died: 3 March 1995 (aged 73) Hanoi, Vietnam
- Party: Communist Party of Vietnam
- Education: Whampoa Military Academy

Military service
- Allegiance: Democratic Republic of Vietnam and later Vietnam
- Branch/service: People's Army of Vietnam
- Rank: Colonel General
- Battles/wars: First Indochina War; Battle of Điện Biên Phủ; Vietnam War; Sino-Vietnamese War

Đàm Quang Trung (born Đàm Ngọc Lưu) (12 September 1921 – 3 March 1995) was a colonel general in the People's Army of Vietnam, active during the First Indochina War, Vietnam War and Sino-Vietnamese War. He commanded PAVN Military Region 1 in Sino-Vietnamese War.

== Early years ==
Đàm Quang Trung was born in Cao Bằng province of the Tonkin Protectorate, French Indochina. He joined the Indochinese Communist Party in 1939. In May 1940 he was imprisoned by French colonial authorities, but was released in March 1941 after interrogation without result. After that, he was sent to study at the Whampoa Military Academy. In September 1944, he began building a guerrilla warfare on the northern border of the country to China. In December, he joined the communist guerrilla movement.

== Military career ==
During the August Revolution in 1945, he served as a company commander of Việt Minh in the seizure of power in Thái Nguyên. After the founding of the Democratic Republic of Vietnam (North Vietnam) he took over again a command of a company but was also the chief officer for the Special Zone Hanoi.

During the First Indochina War, he was deputy commander of the Inter-zone V from 1946 to 1954, deputy commander of the 312th Infantry Division from 1953 to 1954.

Đàm was promoted to the rank of major general in 1974, during the Vietnam War. He was further promoted to lieutenant general in 1980.
