= Charles Piroth =

French Army officer (1906–1954)

- Born: Charles Jean Clément Piroth; 14 August 1906; Champlitte, France
- Died: 15 March 1954 (aged 47); Điện Biên Phủ, Vietnam
- Military career
- Allegiance: France
- Branch: French Army
- Rank: Colonel
- Battles: World War II; Italian Campaign; First Indochina War; Battle of Điện Biên Phủ †
- Awards: Croix de Guerre; Croix de Guerre 1939–1945; Légion d'honneur

Charles Jean Clément Piroth (French: [ʃaʁl piʁɔt]; 14 August 1906 – 15 March 1954) was a French artillery officer and World War II veteran. He served three tours in Vietnam during the First Indochina War. Piroth commanded the artillery during the Battle of Điện Biên Phủ. He was bold and optimistic before hostilities erupted, exulting: "I've got more guns than I need." After failures by his artillery batteries to provide adequate support, he committed suicide in his bunker.

== Biography ==
=== Early life ===
Charles Piroth was the son of a brewer Charles Piroth and Marie Mathilde Bogli. He married Odette Marie Maillot in Champlitte on 30 August 1926.

=== Military career ===
Piroth served as an artillery officer in the Italian Campaign during World War II. His last regimental command was with the 41st Colonial Artillery Regiment.

Piroth served a total of three tours in Indochina, arriving at first with General Philippe Leclerc de Hauteclocque as a major in October 1945. He and his artillerymen were pressed into service as infantry, due to the need for soldiers on the front line and the lack of targets for artillery. Piroth proved a popular and respected commanding officer when serving north of Saigon in an area known as Thu Dau Mot.

On 17 December 1946, Piroth was critically wounded during an ambush though he remained in command until he was eventually evacuated to Saigon, where his arm was amputated without anaesthesia. Piroth was sent to recover in France. He returned to Indochina, but a year later, in 1950, newly arrived General Jean de Lattre de Tassigny dismissed him from the general staff.

=== Điện Biên Phủ ===
In late 1953, Piroth was given command of the artillery force at Điện Biên Phủ by its commander Colonel Christian de Castries. The French artillery at Điện Biên Phủ comprised only 30 medium and heavy guns, although large stocks of shells were airlifted into the zone before the siege began.

Concern was expressed by de Castries and others that the artillery firepower available might prove inadequate in the event of Việt Minh attack, but the experienced Piroth responded that the Việt Minh would be able to move only a small number of light artillery pieces through the steep jungle-covered hills that surrounded the valley of Điện Biên Phủ and that his guns, if well situated, would be capable of dominating the battlefield, adding that "no Viet cannon will fire more than three rounds before it is located and destroyed." He reassured his battery officers: "Don't worry, boys, they will have to reveal their location when they fire, and five minutes later, no more Viet artillery."

"Firstly, the Viet-Minh won't succeed in getting their artillery through to here. Secondly, if they do get here, we'll smash them. Thirdly, even if they manage to keep on shooting, they will be unable to supply their pieces with enough ammunition to do us any real harm."

During the first four months of the French occupation of the valley, Piroth's optimism appeared justified. However, the Việt Minh made use of this quiet interlude to concentrate large quantities of artillery on the high ground, dominating the French garrison; by transporting the weapons along jungle pathways, Piroth's deployment of the outnumbered defending artillery proved inadequate to provide mutually supporting fire for the widely dispersed French strong points.

The opening phases of the battle began with three days of heavy bombardment by the Việt Minh forces led by General Võ Nguyên Giáp. The outmatched defending artillery was unable to adequately assist the besieged French forces on two outlying hills: Gabrielle and Beatrice. Both these fortresses fell quickly to the Việt Minh. Piroth fell into heavy depression due to the failure of his guns to support the defenders and to nullify the Việt Minh artillery, as he had promised before the battle began.

=== Death ===
On 15 March, having circled the camp to apologise to various fellow officers, Piroth returned to his bunker and removed the pin from a grenade clutched to his chest, blowing himself up. He was buried secretly in his bunker, and his death was covered up for several days until newspapers airdropped on the camp notified the men, the news of the death having been leaked to the paper from an unknown source. His replacement, Lieutenant Colonel Guy Vaillant, arrived on 20 March via air ambulance, one of the few to successfully land at Điện Biên Phủ during the conflict.

== Awards and honors ==
- Commander of the Legion of Honor
- Croix de Guerre 1939–1945 with bronze palm and two citations
- Croix de guerre des théâtres d'opérations extérieures

== Sources ==
- Morgan, T. (2010). Valley of Death: The Tragedy at Dien Bien Phu That Led America into the Vietnam War. New York: Random House. ISBN 9781588369802.
- Schrader, C. R. (2015). A War of Logistics: Parachutes and Porters in Indochina, 1945–1954. Lexington: University Press of Kentucky. ISBN 9780813165769.
- Windrow, M. C. (2004). The Last Valley: Dien Bien Phu and the French Defeat in Vietnam. Boston: Da Capo Press. ISBN 9780306813863.
