= Mường Thanh Valley =

Valley in Vietnam

Coordinates: 21°23′N 103°01′E

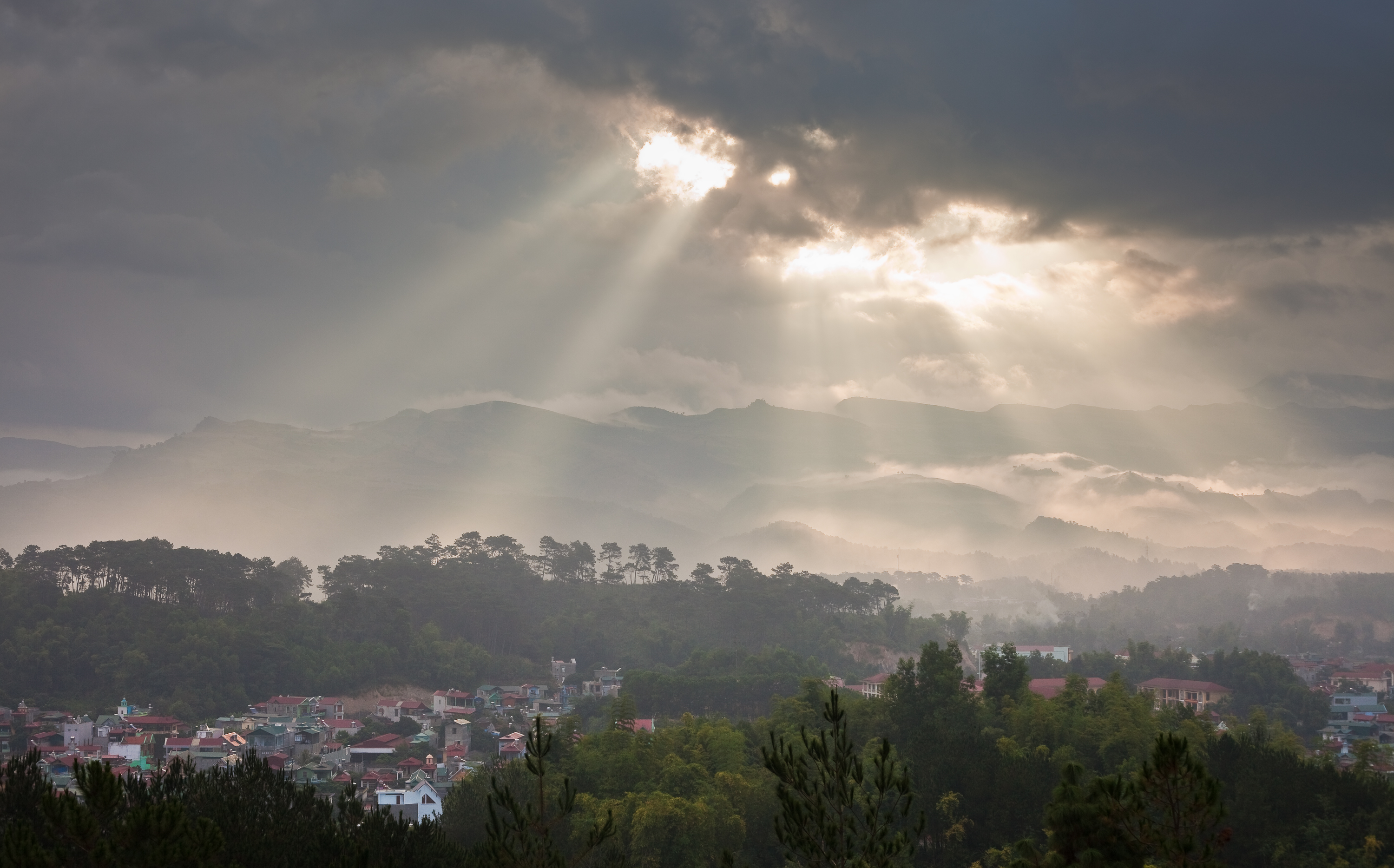
View from D1 hill

The Mường Thanh Valley is a valley located in the Điện Biên Province of Northwestern Vietnam. The valley is approximately 20 km long by 5 km wide. A heart-shaped basin, the valley is surrounded by a region filled with jungles, rice paddies, and lakes. Located within the Mường Thanh Valley is the city of Điện Biên Phủ. The capital of Điện Biên Province, Điện Biên Phủ, is famous as the site of a decisive battle in 1954 in which French forces were defeated by Việt Minh troops under general Võ Nguyên Giáp.

== Geography and location ==
Located in the Điện Biên Province of Northwestern Vietnam, the Mường Thanh valley lies at the crossroads of many different modern political boundaries. Two other Vietnamese provinces border the Điện Biên Province, Lai Châu to the east and north, and Sơn La to the east and south. The northern section of Điện Biên Province borders the province of Yunnan in China and the entire Western border of the province is shared with the Phongsali province of Laos. The valley is located 420 kilometers away from capital Hanoi.

The Mường Thanh Valley lies in a hilly, lush region. The valley runs north-south and is situated in the western portion of the Điện Biên Province, approximately 16 km from the border with Laos.

== Demography and culture ==
Approximately 40 percent of the inhabitants of the Điện Biên Province belong to the Tai ethnic minority group. While the delta and coastal plain regions of Vietnam are largely populated by the ethnic majority Vietnamese, also known as the Kinh, the highlands are home to many of Vietnam's ethnic minority groups. Many of the ethnic groups in Northern Vietnam are Chinese-descended. However the Thai, among other ethnic groups that inhabit the Mường Thanh Valley and the surrounding highland regions, are not Chinese-descended. The Thai, along with other ethnic groups that inhabit the Điện Biên Province, are largely independent and follow their own series of customs and traditions. The Thai, among other non-Chinese minority ethnic groups in Vietnam such as the Tay, Nùng, Hmong, Muong, Cham, Khmer, Kohor, E De, Bahnar, and Jarai, have their own languages and writing systems. Belief holds that the Thai are originally descended from lowland natives of Zhuang-Dong origin. They were forced into the highlands by continuous invasions of the Mongoloid people of China. Much Thai folklore surrounds the history of the Mường Thanh Valley. According to Thai folklore, the Thai originally named the valley Muong Then (the land of God) sometimes spelt Muang Thaeng. The Vietnamese Government provides the following story about the history of the Thai people according to Thai folklore:

The Thai people believe that Then (God) created human beings in a gourd, which he punctured with a stick to release them.

The first people to emerge from the gourd were the Xa, who have the darkest complexions. They were followed in turn by the Thai, the Lao, the Lu, the Mong and finally the Kinh (the Vietnamese ethnic majority). The gourd then became a mountain, which stands today in Tau Pung Commune in the middle of the Mường Thanh Valley.

It's only fitting then that the Pha Din Pass, which must be crossed to reach Dien Bien Phu and the Mường Thanh Valley from Ha Noi, is also known as Cong Troi, or Heaven's Gate.

While the Thai are the largest single ethnic group in the Mường Thanh Valley, the Hmong, Dao, and Day ethnic groups also inhabit the valley. There is also a substantial population of the Vietnamese ethnic majority group, Kinh, in the city of Dien Bien Phu.

Most of the groups in the regions follow animistic religious beliefs. There are also Catholics, Protestants, Buddhists, and Muslims.

== History ==
The valley was associated with Muang Then, a legendary land where the Tai peoples first settled after migrating southward from Yunnan around the time of the Kingdom of Nanzhao under their leader Khun Borom.

Due to its location along the border with Laos and near the border with China, the Mường Thanh Valley and the surrounding region has had a long history of invasions and political change.

In the 15th century, the troops of Vietnamese Emperor Lê Lợi allied with the indigenous inhabitants to expel the Chinese Ming invaders.

Three hundred years later, the Mường Thanh Valley came under the occupation of the Phe people from Laos. The Thai vigorously fought the Phe invaders and finally defeated them in 1751 with help from a peasant leader from Son Nam named Hoang Cong Chat.

Until French rule began, the inhabitants of the Mường Thanh Valley and many of Vietnam's other highland minority groups were quite isolated from the major lowland populations. When the French arrived in the nineteenth century they began to consolidate rule and contact between highland regions such as Mường Thanh and the lowland regions increased. The French sought contacts with the Thai and other highland groups in order to cultivate their land. This often led to conflict between the French and the minority groups because the natives did not trust the French.

After independence from the French, the Mường Thanh Valley fell under the rule of the North Vietnamese government and the inhabitants were given a certain degree of autonomy as a compromise for accepting the rule of the central government in Hanoi.

== Natural life ==
Flowing through the Mường Thanh Valley is the Nam Rom River. The presence of the Nam Rom River in the valley makes the valley region highly fertile. Much of the natural environment of the Mường Thanh Valley is jungle. The non-urbanized land in the valley is now largely used for agriculture, namely rice growing.

== Economic development ==
While the area surrounding the Mường Thanh Valley is largely rural and undeveloped, the valley itself is developed. The capital of the Điện Biên Province, the city of Dien Bien Phu, is located inside the valley.

The Vietnamese government is working to develop theMường Thanh Valley into a popular tourist destination. Many war veterans and other tourists come to the region to revisit the important sights of the Battle of Dien Bien Phu. The Vietnamese government is now working to further develop the region's tourist infrastructure and appeal by promoting the diversity of local culture.

The Vietnamese government is advertising local Thai culture in an effort to introduce outsiders to the local culture. In 2004 the Vietnam Administration of Tourism and the Điện Biên Province announced that that year would be the "Year of Dien Bien Tourism". This announcement came with a gift of around US$9500 to each commune in Dien Bien to build a commune hall to host visitors. These communes will showcase and introduce tourists to Thai culture.

Trekking, mountain biking, and other nature-oriented tourist activities are also being promoted in the Mường Thanh Valley.

Additionally, a commercial airport is located in the Mường Thanh Valley. The airport, located in Dien Bien Phu, offers flights to Hanoi.

Rice farming also contributes to the local economy.

== Battle of Dien Bien Phu ==
The First Indochina War began on December 19, 1946 as a battle between the French trying to regain their colonial claims in Vietnam and the Viet Minh attempting to gain control of the area. In the early 1950s Viet Minh forces were making steady advancements on French-controlled parts of Northern Vietnam. By late 1952 much of the Red River Delta was under Viet Minh control. Due to its proximity to supply routes from China, the Mường Thanh Valley region was vital to the survival and support of the Viet Minh. The French forces in Vietnam under General Henri Navarre sought to occupy Dien Bien Phu. This would allow them to cut off an important supply route to the Viet Minh and also help them to fight against a Viet Minh offensive in Laos.

Thus, in November 1953, French forces occupied the town of Dien Bien Phu and used their nearby military post at Lai Châu for reinforcement. Also during November 1953 the Northern Vietnamese Government indicated that it would examine diplomatic settlement proposals from the French. If the Vietnamese army could successfully attack a French-held zone leading up to the talks that were scheduled for April and May 1954, they felt that they would have enough leverage to broker an acceptable peace agreement. Because of Dien Bien Phu's strategic importance, it was chosen as the stage for this attack.

The siege of Dien Bien Phu began on March 13, 1954. By this date the Viet Minh had approximately 50,000 regular troops, 55,000 support troops in the area. They also had around 100,000 transport workers in Mường Thanh Valley area bringing in Chinese aid. The French garrison at Dien Bien Phu relied on air supply and on March 27 the Viet Minh had destroyed the French airfield. This left the French effectively cut off from the outside world. The Viet Minh had artillery posts and troops set up throughout the valley and were able to continuously assault the French.

The French garrison in Dien Bien Phu surrendered on May 7.
