= Rats of Nam Yum =

The Rats of Nam Yum were internal deserters from the French forces at the Battle of Dien Bien Phu during the First Indochina War.

The "Rats" consisted of French, Foreign Legion, African, Vietnamese, and Thai tribal troops who were unable or unwilling to defect to the Viet Minh opposing the French, but reluctant to continue to fight as part of the French forces. Reportedly the majority were locally recruited Indochinese, plus Algerian and Moroccan tirailleurs.

Estimated to have numbered about one thousand, the Rats sequestered themselves in a portion of the fortress of Dien Bien Phu on the cliffs overlooking the Nam Yum river to wait out the battle. They subsisted on rations and equipment stolen from the French forces or from airdropped supplies they were able to intercept. Lacking shelters or building supplies, they took to digging dugouts for shelter.

A 2018 history of the Battle of Dien Bien Phu draws on reports from the commander of the fortress gendarmerie detachment to suggest that the numbers of the "Rats of Nam Yum" were exaggerated in earlier accounts; and that many were not deserters but had remained with disbanded or disorganised sub-units pulled back from the firing line and dispersed along the river bank. While not participating in actual combat during the final stages of the siege, some of these troops performed the role of support personnel; collecting and bringing in parachuted supplies to the main garrison.

== Sources ==
- Fall, Bernard B. . Hell in a Very Small Place. Da Capo Press, 1985. ISBN 978-0-306-80231-7.
