= 5th Armored Division (France) =

5th Armoured Division
- 5e Division Blindée, 5e DB
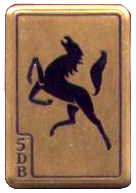
- Active: 9 July 1943 – 15 May 1962; 1978 – 30 June 1992
- Country: France
- Branch: (France) French Army
- Type: Armored
- Engagements: World War II; Algerian War

Commanders
- Notable commanders: Henri Navarre; Christian de Castries

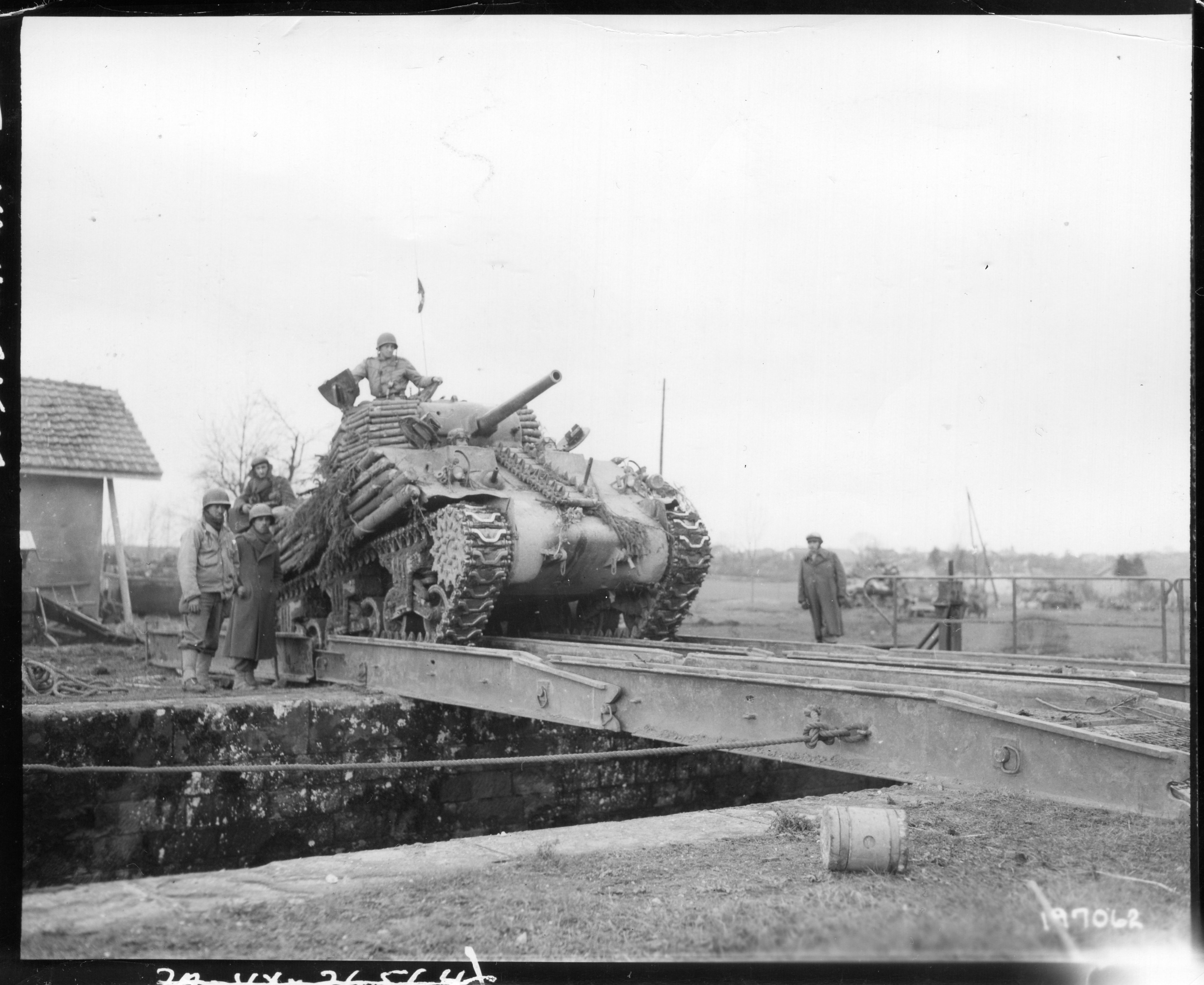
An M4 Sherman tank crosses a treadway bridge near Belfort, France, as the French drive to take this German strong point. November 20, 1944

The 5th Armored Division (French: 5e Division Blindée, 5e DB) was an armored division of the French Army that fought in World War II and the Algerian War. It was also active in Germany during the Cold War.

== World War II ==
The division was formed on 1 May 1943 under the command of Brig. Gen. Henri-Jacques-Jean-François de Vernejoul. It was initially the 2nd Armored Division, but renamed the 5th Armored Division on 9 July. The Division was a critical part of the French 1st Army under General Jean de Lattre de Tassigny, and came ashore with the U.S. 6th Army Group, under Lt. Gen. Jacob Devers, in the Operation Dragoon invasion of southern France in August 1944. The 5th Armored Division particularly distinguished itself in the assault and capture of Stuttgart, Germany in April 1945.

== Cold War ==
During the Cold War, the division was initially stationed in West Germany; its HQ was in Landau, Palatinate.

== Algeria ==
The division left Germany for Algeria on 1 April 1956, but left some units in Palatinate, Germany.

In 1961 the division comprised:

- 1st Armored Regiment
- 6th African Chasseur Regiment
- 11th African Chasseur Regiment
- 19th Chasseur Battalion
- 20th Chasseur Battalion
- 21st Algerian Rifles Regiment
- 1st/64th Artillery Regiment
- 2nd/64th Artillery Regiment

== Return to Germany ==
The division was recreated in 1978 at Landau, Germany as a part of the 2nd Army Corps (Baden-Baden). It included the 2nd Artillery Regiment (during the 1980s). The French Army in Germany was drastically reduced after the end of the Cold War; the 5th was dissolved on 30 June 1992.
