= Henri Navarre =

French army general (1898–1983)

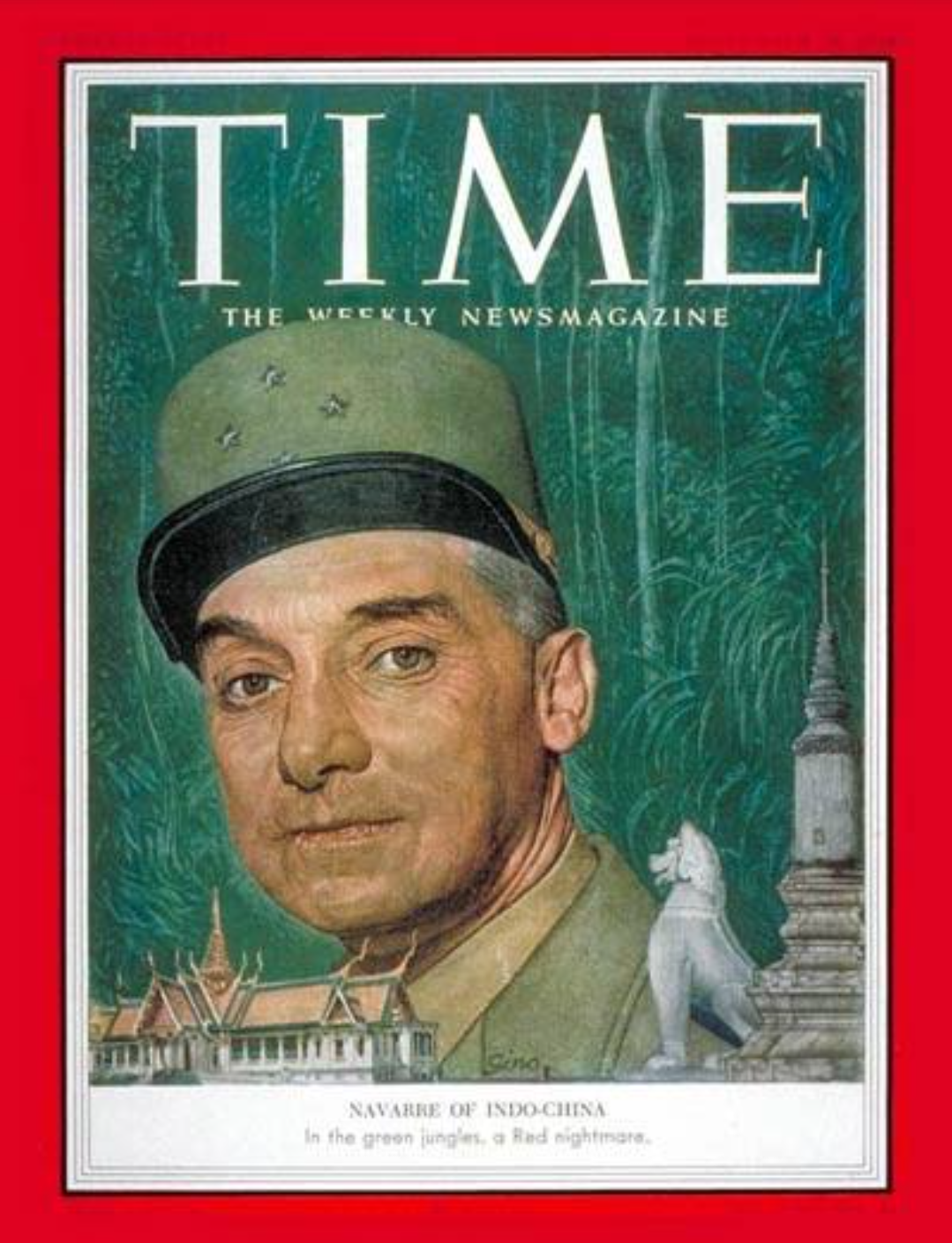
- Navarre on the cover of Time
- Born: Henri Eugène Navarre; 31 July 1898; Villefranche-de-Rouergue, France
- Died: 26 September 1983 (aged 85); Paris, France
- Military career
- Allegiance: France
- Branch: French Army
- Service years: 1917–1956
- Rank: Général de corps d'armée
- Commands: French Far East Expeditionary Corps
- Conflicts: World War I World War II; First Indochina War

Henri Eugène Navarre (French pronunciation: [ɑ̃ʁi navaʁ]; 31 July 1898 – 26 September 1983) was a French Army general. He fought during World War I, World War II and was the seventh and final commander of French Far East Expeditionary Corps during the First Indochina War. Navarre was in overall command during the French defeat at the Battle of Điện Biên Phủ.

== Biography ==
Navarre entered l'École spéciale militaire de Saint-Cyr in 1916 and in May 1917 was sent to the front with a cavalry unit, 2e régiment de hussards. By 15 August 1917 he earned command of a platoon. He was given a field promotion to lieutenant 21 April 1918. He was awarded the Croix de Guerre with bronze star for his exemplary service between 28 September 1918 and 4 October 1918. In March 1919, he was transferred to Syria, then in 1922 to Germany with the Occupation Force. In 1927 he was sent to École supérieure de guerre, the War College. He participated in the pacification of the Atlas and southern Morocco from 1930 to 1934. From 1934 to 1936 he was a captain in the 11e régiment de cuirassiers. From 1938 to 1940 he was assigned to the German section of the Intelligence Service of the General Staff. While there, he submitted a proposal code named "Desperado", outlining a plan to assassinate Hitler. The project drew little support from his superior, Colonel Louis Rivet, and was ultimately rejected by Prime Minister Édouard Daladier.

After the Armistice of 22 June 1940, Navarre was appointed head of the intelligence and counter-espionage bureau of General Maxime Weygand in Algiers. When he was recalled in 1942 for his anti-German activities, he went underground, joining the Resistance as head of the ORA. He commanded an armored regiment of the 1st Army in the liberation of France.

He was promoted to brigadier general in 1945 and posted to Germany, where he held various positions including that of commander of 5e division blindée (5th Armored Division) and chief of staff of Marshal Alphonse Juin. He remained in Germany until May 1953, except for a brief assignment as a division commander in Algeria from 1948 to 1949.

Navarre was appointed général de corps d'armée, equivalent of lieutenant general, in 1952.

On 27 May 1953, Navarre replaced Raoul Salan as commander of French forces in Indochina, in the midst of a war with the Viet Minh that was going badly. The French government wanted to stabilize the situation so that they could begin peace negotiations on favorable terms; military victory was no longer an objective.

Navarre's instructions were to insure the safety of the troops under his command. Instead, he undertook Operation Castor on 20 November 1953. Five French battalions parachuted into Điện Biên Phủ in the Mường Thanh Valley, a 20-km-long, 6-km-wide basin surrounded by hills. Navarre hoped to draw the Viet Minh into a pitched battle where he hoped to defeat them.

Authorities in France did not learn of the operation until six hours after it started.

Things went wrong almost immediately. The French position came under heavy, unanticipated artillery fire from the surrounding hills. Troops were unable to execute any missions beyond the valley floor, limiting actions to patrols and local counterattacks. It became increasingly difficult to bring in supplies by air, or to provide air support.

After intelligence reports on 3 December 1953 showed four enemy divisions closing on Điện Biên Phủ, Navarre issued instructions accepting battle and calling for Điện Biên Phủ to be held at all costs. By January 1954 he started exploring plans for withdrawal. He soon realized any breakout attempt would be suicidal. No significant attempt to break out was ever made.

Complicating the situation, Navarre initiated a second offensive operation on 12 December 1953, committing nearly twice as many troops to Operation Atlante in south central Vietnam, over 400 miles from Điện Biên Phủ. Navarre saw Operation Atlante as his main effort; he did not believe that Điện Biên Phủ would be a decisive operation. He even speculated that the loss of Điện Biên Phủ Dien was strategically acceptable.

Navarre failed to consider the devastating effect the loss would have on Army morale, and the resulting loss of political support for the war at home.

By 13 March 1954 the attack on Điện Biên Phủ had begun. The French garrison numbered about 13,000; the Viet Minh massed more than 50,000 men.

After some initial success, Operation Atlante quickly bogged down into a series of Viet Minh ambushes on French convoys. The French eventually terminated Operation Atlante with no tangible gains while Điện Biên Phủ was lost on 7 May 1954, after a siege of 54 days.

Peace talks began in Geneva the next morning. Any negotiating advantage the French government had expected had been lost by Navarre's miscalculations. The First Indochina War was over.

Considered responsible for the loss, Navarre was replaced 3 June 1954 by General Paul Ély. He remained in the Army, retiring in 1956. In the same year he published Agonie de l'Indochine, a work which blamed the Indochina defeat on the nature of the French political system, intellectuals, politicians, journalists, and communists. The book warned of the possible necessity for an army coup to replace the French Fourth Republic. He died in Paris in 1983.

== Decorations ==
- Commander of the Légion d'honneur
- Croix de guerre 1914–1918
- Croix de guerre 1939–1945
- Médaille de la Résistance with rosette
- Distinguished Service Cross (US)

He received 1500 citations during his career.

== Bibliography ==
- Encyclopedia of the Vietnam War, ed. Spencer Tucker, s.v. "Navarre, Henri Eugene."
- Jacques Dalloz, Dictionnaire de la guerre d'Indochine, Armand Colin, 2006, p. 282 ISBN 2-200-26925-0 and 78-2200269258
- René Bail and Raymond Muelle, Guerre d'Indochine, Trésor du patrimoine, 2004 ISBN 2-912511-27-5 and 978-2912511270
- Major Harry D. Bloomer, USA, An Analysis of the French Defeat at Dien Bien Phu, CSC 1991. <http://www.globalsecurity.org/military/library/report/1991/BHD.htm>.
