= Điện Biên Phủ (city) =

Điện Biên Phủ 奠邊府
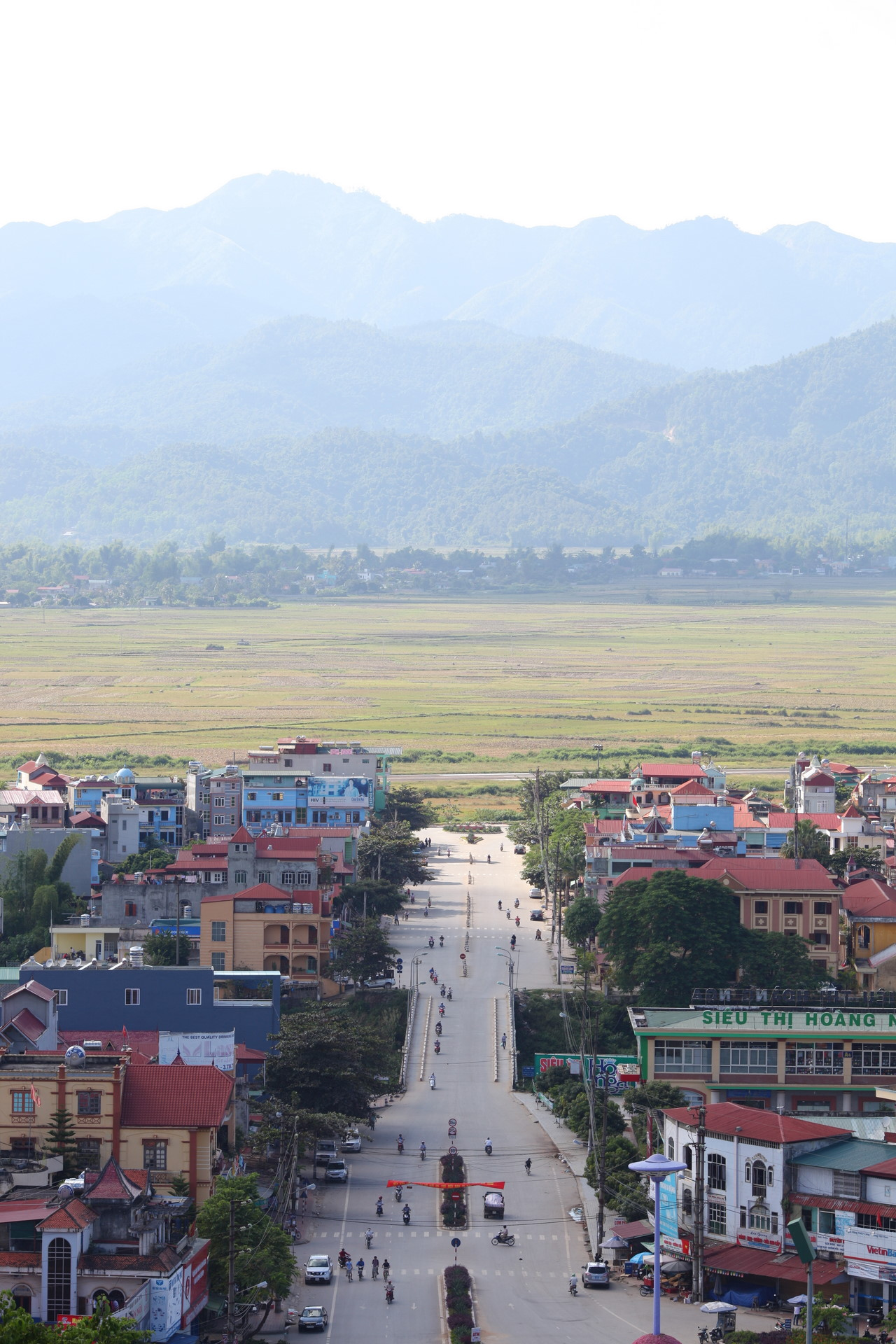
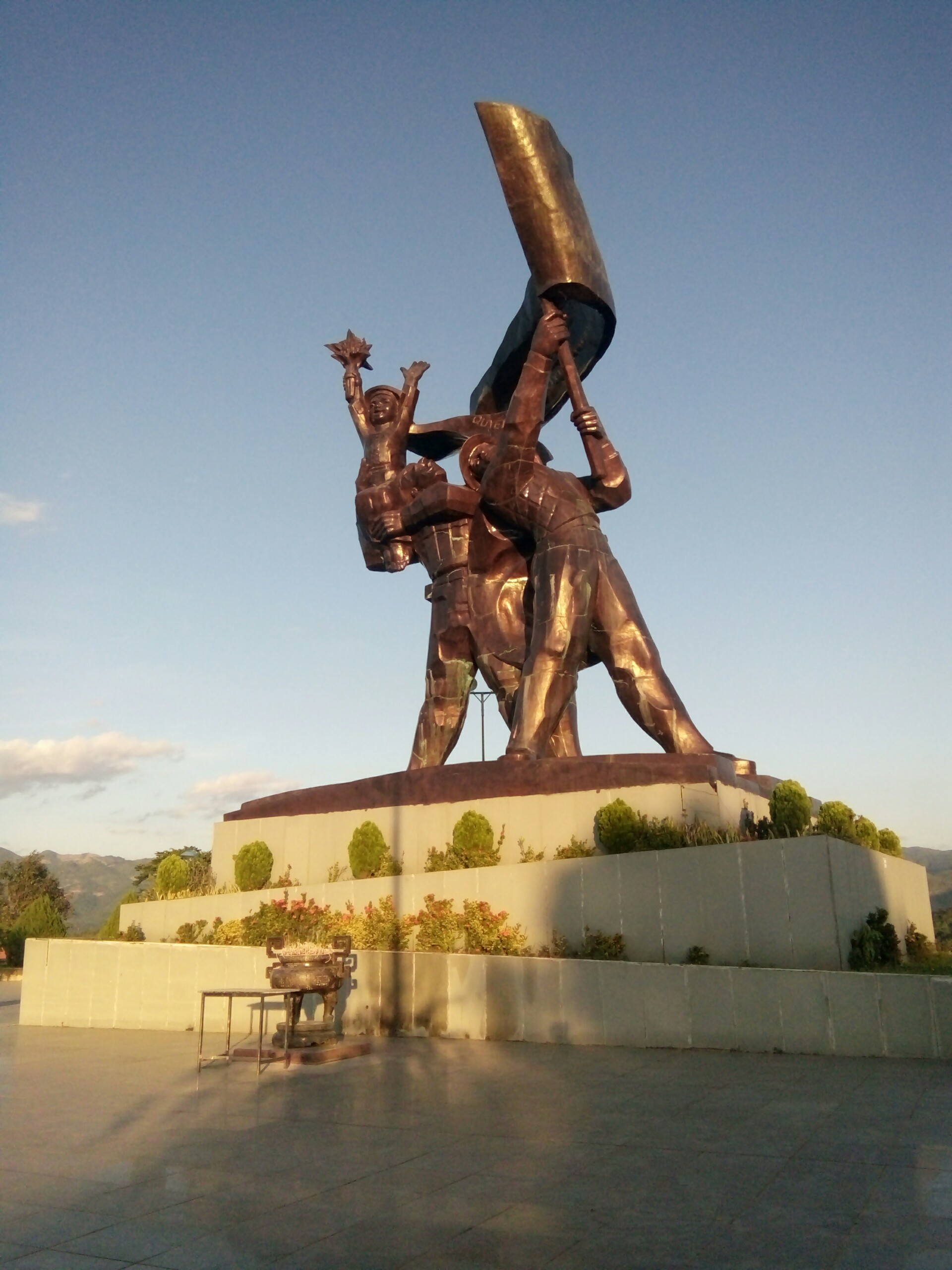
- View of Điện Biên Phủ and the Điện Biên Phủ Victory Monument
- Location in northern Vietnam
- Location of Điện Biên in Vietnam
- Coordinates: 21°23′N 103°1′E
- Country: Vietnam
- Province: Điện Biên
- Founded: April 18, 1992: established Điện Biên Phủ town; September 26, 2003: established Điện Biên Phủ city

Area
  - City: 308.18 km^{2} (118.99 sq mi)

Population (December 31, 2022)
  - City: 84,672
  - Density: 274.75/km^{2} (711.60/sq mi)
  - Urban: 59,876
  - Ethnicities: Kinh Thai H'Mong
- Time zone: UTC+7 (Indochina Time)
- Climate: Aw
- Website: tpdienbienphu.dienbien.gov.vn

Điện Biên Phủ (Vietnamese: [ɗîənˀ ɓīən fû], chữ Hán: 奠邊府) is a city in the northwestern region of Vietnam. It was the capital of Điện Biên Province before the 2025 Vietnamese administrative reform. The city is best known for the decisive Battle of Điện Biên Phủ, which occurred during the First Indochina War of independence against France. The region is a center of ethnic Tai culture. In prior history, the city was formerly called Muang Thaeng.

Điện Biên Phủ lies in Mường Thanh Valley, a 20 km (12 mi) long and 6 km (3.7 mi) wide basin sometimes described as "heart-shaped." It is on the western edge of Điện Biên Province, of which it is the capital, and is only about 10 kilometres (6.2 mi) from the border with Laos.

Until the creation of Điện Biên Province in 2004, Điện Biên Phủ was part of Lai Châu Province. The Vietnamese government elevated Điện Biên Phủ to town status in 1992, and to city status in 2003. Following the 2025 Vietnamese administrative reform, city-level administrative divisions ceased to exist, and the area previously administered by the municipality of Điện Biên Phủ was transferred to the administration of its constituent wards, including Điện Biên Phủ Ward.

== Demographics ==
Statistics on Điện Biên Phủ's population vary depending on definitions—figures are generally between 70,000 and 125,000. The city is growing quickly and was projected to have a population of 150,000 by 2020.

According to statistics from the government, as of 2019, the city had a population of 80,366 people, covering an area of 308.18 km^{2}.

== Transport ==
National Route 12 connects Điện Biên to Lai Châu. Điện Biên Phủ Airport serves the city with daily routes to Hanoi which are operated by Vietnam Airlines

== History ==
The 8th century Thai locality of Muang Then is believed to have been centered here.

=== Nineteenth and early twentieth century ===
Điện Biên Phủ was rather politically removed from central Vietnamese control until 1841. In this year, under the Nguyễn dynasty, Điện Biên Phủ was directly incorporated into the Vietnamese political system when they established the town as an administrative district. This was partly done for more direct control of the region and to stop bandits who were exploiting the opium trade.

In 1887, Điện Biên Phủ became a French protectorate. To ensure that the French would control the local opium trade, they appointed a sole administrator to supervise the trade and control the town. Other than a Hmong rebellion in 1918, the town was under French control until the Japanese occupied it during World War II. By early May 1945, the Japanese occupied Điện Biên Phủ and planned to convert it into a large military and logistical base. However, with an airstrip barely being enlarged, Chinese nationalist troops took the town in August of the same year. Subsequently, the nationalist forces then gave way to returning French troops.

=== Operation Castor (1953) ===
In the 1950s, the town was known for its famous opium traffic, generating 500,000,000 French francs annually. It was also an extensive source of rice for the Việt Minh.

The region was fortified in November 1953 by the French Union force in the biggest airborne operation of the 1946–1954 First Indochina War, Operation Castor, to block Việt Minh transport routes and to set the stage to draw out Việt Minh forces.

=== Siege of Điện Biên Phủ (1954) ===
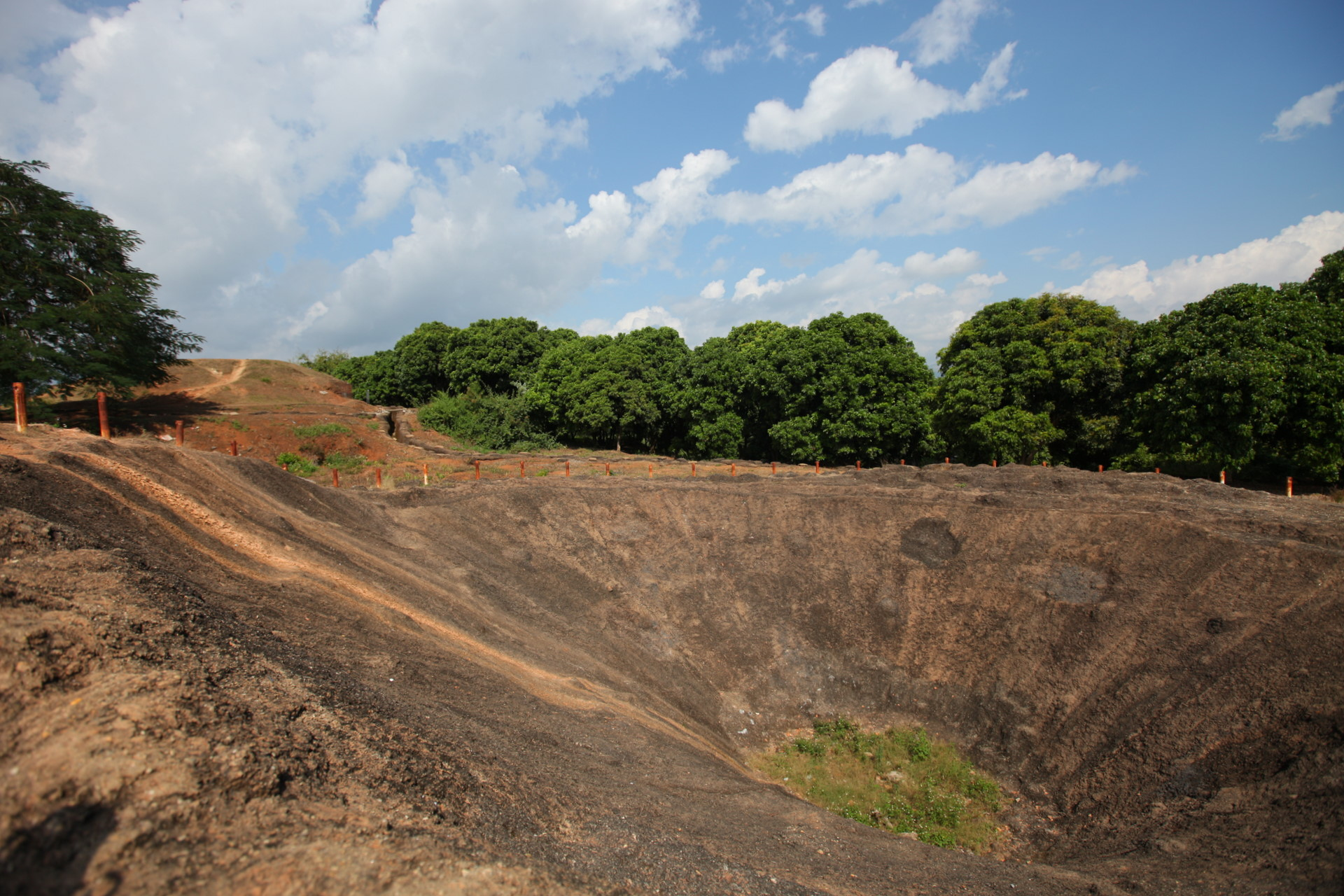
Explosion crater at the top of A1 Hill (named Eliane 2 by French)

The following year, the important Battle of Điện Biên Phủ was fought between the Việt Minh (led by General Võ Nguyên Giáp), and the French Union (led by General Henri Navarre, successor to General Raoul Salan). The siege of the French garrison lasted fifty-seven days, from 17:30, 13 March to 17:30, 7 May 1954. The southern outpost or fire base of "Camp Isabelle" did not follow the cease-fire order and fought until 01:00 the following day. The long-scheduled Geneva Meeting's Indochina conference involving the United States, the UK, the French Union and the USSR had already begun on 26 April 1954.

The battle was significant beyond the valleys of Điện Biên Phủ. Giáp's victory ended major French involvement in Indochina and led to the Geneva accords which partitioned Vietnam into North and South.

Điện Biên Phủ apparently recovered quickly after the siege. When Wilfred Burchett visited the area in 1962, he found a 5,000-acre state-owned farm growing coffee, cotton, rice, and sugar cane on land that had once been a battleground. For example, the airstrip at Isabelle was now a rice field, and most of the approach trenches used by the Việt Minh had been filled in. The farm manager told him that 1,500 soldiers from 176th regiment arrived in 1958 to cultivate the area, followed by 1,200 volunteers from the Red River Delta, of which 900 were women. During their first season there, they cleared away the leftover land mines and rushed to grow enough crops in time, to the exclusion of other activities. They did not have housing until after the first season; in the meantime, they sheltered with the local Thái tribe, who also gave them extra seeds for growing rice. Burchett claimed he also saw a hospital with 60 beds, some pottery-making facilities, the remains of a French tank and various airplanes, two tombstones dedicated to the two soldiers who blew up said tank, a "modest" monument packed with more tombstones, and a "small museum" filled with homemade weapons used in the battle.

== Climate ==
Climate data for Điện Biên Phủ
Month	Jan	Feb	Mar	Apr	May	Jun	Jul	Aug	Sep	Oct	Nov	Dec	Year
Record high °C (°F)	32.4 (90.3)	35.0 (95.0)	36.1 (97.0)	39.0 (102.2)	38.6 (101.5)	38.6 (101.5)	36.0 (96.8)	36.0 (96.8)	35.0 (95.0)	35.8 (96.4)	34.0 (93.2)	31.6 (88.9)	39.0 (102.2)
Mean daily maximum °C (°F)	23.8 (74.8)	26.2 (79.2)	29.0 (84.2)	31.0 (87.8)	31.7 (89.1)	31.1 (88.0)	30.4 (86.7)	30.4 (86.7)	30.5 (86.9)	29.2 (84.6)	26.7 (80.1)	23.9 (75.0)	28.6 (83.5)
Daily mean °C (°F)	18.2 (64.8)	19.9 (67.8)	22.4 (72.3)	25.2 (77.4)	26.7 (80.1)	27.3 (81.1)	26.9 (80.4)	26.7 (80.1)	26.1 (79.0)	24.3 (75.7)	21.2 (70.2)	18.2 (64.8)	23.6 (74.5)
Mean daily minimum °C (°F)	12.5 (54.5)	13.5 (56.3)	15.8 (60.4)	19.3 (66.7)	21.7 (71.1)	23.4 (74.1)	23.3 (73.9)	23.0 (73.4)	21.7 (71.1)	19.4 (66.9)	15.7 (60.3)	12.4 (54.3)	18.5 (65.3)
Record low °C (°F)	−1.3 (29.7)	4.8 (40.6)	5.3 (41.5)	11.4 (52.5)	14.8 (58.6)	17.4 (63.3)	18.7 (65.7)	10.7 (51.3)	14.2 (57.6)	7.7 (45.9)	4.0 (39.2)	0.4 (32.7)	−1.3 (29.7)
Average rainfall mm (inches)	26.9 (1.06)	26.4 (1.04)	55.6 (2.19)	115.1 (4.53)	182.5 (7.19)	253.5 (9.98)	314.6 (12.39)	316.6 (12.46)	150.7 (5.93)	59.4 (2.34)	32.5 (1.28)	26.1 (1.03)	1,573.5 (61.95)
Average rainy days	4.6	3.8	6.2	12.5	16.6	19.6	22.6	21.0	13.3	8.1	5.5	3.7	137.2
Average relative humidity (%)	82.4	80.2	80.2	81.7	82.2	83.9	86.4	87.5	86.3	84.2	83.1	83.1	83.4
Mean monthly sunshine hours	159.8	177.3	198.4	202.0	202.3	141.3	132.7	148.6	168.4	170.5	160.5	160.0	2,025.4
Source: Vietnam Institute for Building Science and Technology

== See also ==
- Battle of Điện Biên Phủ
- Operation Castor

== Media links ==
- (in French) The situation of Điện Biên Phủ, 50 years after the battle (French news, public channel France 2, 5 May 2004)
