= Điện Biên Phủ (ward) =

Coordinates: 21°24′09″N 103°01′51″E

- Ward
- Country: Vietnam
- Province: Điện Biên
- Time zone: UTC+07:00 (Indochina Time)

Điện Biên Phủ is a ward (phường) of Điện Biên Province of northwestern Vietnam.

The Standing Committee of the National Assembly promulgated Resolution No. 1661/NQ-UBTVQH15 on the rearrangement of commune-level administrative units of Điện Biên Province in 2025 (the Resolution takes effect from 16 June 2025). Accordingly, Điện Biên Phủ Ward was established under Điện Biên Province on the basis of the entire 6.12 km² of natural area and a population of 12,257 from Him Lam Ward; the entire 1.68 km² of natural area and a population of 11,361 from Mường Thanh Ward; the entire 1.27 km² of natural area and a population of 9,414 from Tân Thanh Ward; the entire 0.78 km² of natural area and a population of 5,043 from Thanh Bình Ward; the entire 6.74 km² of natural area and a population of 7,648 from Thanh Trường Ward; and the entire 40.17 km² of natural area and a population of 3,482 from Thanh Minh Commune of Điện Biên Phủ City.
