= Christian de Castries =

French general (1902–1991)

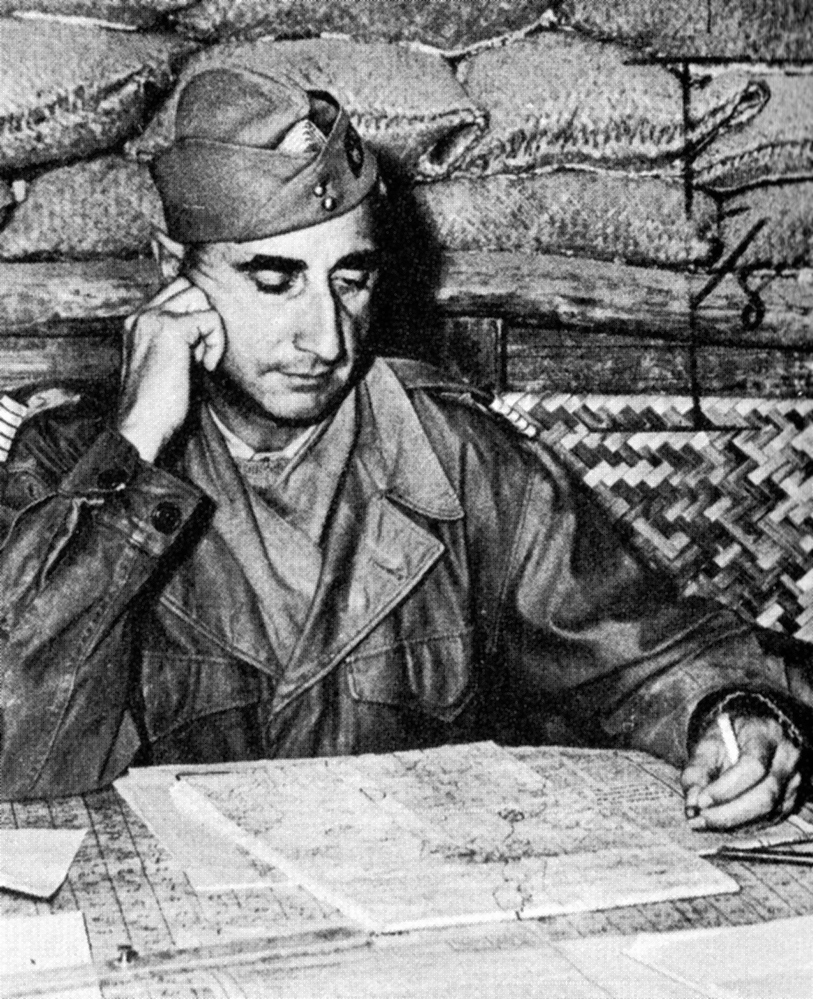
- Born: 11 August 1902; Paris, France
- Died: 29 July 1991 (aged 88); Paris, France
- Military career
- Allegiance: France
- Branch: French Army
- Service years: 1921–1959
- Rank: General de brigade
- Commands: Mobile Group 2 Mobile Group 1 Operational Group North-West
- Conflicts: World War II; First Indochina War; Battle of Dien Bien Phu

Christian Marie Ferdinand de la Croix de Castries (11 August 1902 – 29 July 1991) was a French general and the commander of forces at the Battle of Dien Bien Phu in 1954.

== Biography ==
Christian de Castries was born into a distinguished military family, the House of Castries, and enlisted in the army at the age of 19. He was sent to the Saumur Cavalry School. In 1926 de Castries was commissioned as a cavalry officer but later resigned to devote himself to equestrian sports. After rejoining the army at the start of World War II, he was captured (1940), escaped from a German prisoner-of-war camp (1941), and fought with the Allied forces in North Africa, Italy, the south of France, and finally in the invasion of southern Germany. He ended the war in command of the 3rd Moroccan Spahis (mechanized cavalry), whose distinctive red cap he subsequently wore throughout his service in French Indochina.

In 1946, de Castries, soon to become a lieutenant colonel, was sent to Indochina where he commanded a tabor (battalion) of Moroccan goumiers. He was wounded and spent a year recuperating in France before returning to Vietnam as a full colonel. In December 1953, he was charged with defending fortress of Dien Bien Phu against the Viet Minh. After an eight-week siege, the garrison was defeated, and near the end, de Castries was promoted to brigadier general. The French were overrun by Viet Minh forces on 7 May 1954, effectively ending the First Indochina War and French presence in Southeast Asia. He was held prisoner for four months while an armistice agreement was reached in Geneva.

Upon his return to France, de Castries was appointed to command the 5th Armored Division, then stationed in West Germany. Following a car accident in 1959, he retired from the military. He subsequently headed a recycling firm and died in Paris on 29 July 1991.
