= Martin Windrow =

British historian

- Died: 3 April 2025
- Occupations: Military historian and author
- Writing career
- Language: English
- Subjects: Military history, French history, Indochina, Algeria, French Foreign Legion, World War II
- Notable works: The Last Valley (2004), Our Friends Beneath the Sands (2010)

Martin Clive Windrow (1944-3 April 2025) was a British historian, editor and author of several hundred books, articles and monographs, particularly those on organizational or physical details of military history, and the history of the post-war French Foreign Legion. His most notable works include The Last Valley, an account of the Battle of Dien Bien Phu during the First Indochina War, which was published in 2004 to "critical acclaim", and Our Friends beneath the Sands published in 2010.

== Biography ==
Windrow was educated at Wellington College, a boarding independent school in the village of Crowthorne in Berkshire. He began working on commission as an editor of articles on military and aviation history in the 1970s. He was an Associate of the Royal Historical Society and the Foreign Legion Association of Great Britain.

Windrow was a major contributor to Osprey Publishing, which specialises in military history. An obituary published by the company credited him with having commissioned and edited around 700 of the books it published between the 1960s and 2020s. Windrow also personally wrote 21 books which Osprey published between 1971 and 2024.

Windrow died in 2025.

== Works ==
- Rommel's Desert Army, 1976.
- Tank and AFV Crew Uniforms Since 1916, Patrick Stephens Ltd, 1979, ISBN 0-85059-3638.
- The Waffen-SS, Osprey Publishing, 1984. ISBN 0-85045-425-5.
- Inside the Soviet Army Today, 1987.
- French Foreign Legion. Men-at-Arms-Series; Osprey Military No. 300. Osprey, London 1996, ISBN 1-85532-621-3.
- The Algerian War, 1954-62. Men-at Arms-Series; Osprey Military No. 312. Osprey, London 1997, ISBN 978-1-85532-658-3.
- Military Dress of the Peninsular War, 1808-14, 1998.
- The French Indochina War 1946–54, 1998.
- French Foreign Legion, 1914-45, 1999.
- The World's Greatest Military Leaders, 2000.
- Warriors and Warlords: The Art of Angus McBride, 2002.
- The Last Valley, 2004.
- Not One Step Back, 2009.
- Our Friends Beneath the Sands, 2010.
- The Owl Who Liked Sitting on Caesar, 2014.
