= First Indochina War =

1946–1954 French colonial war in Indochina

- Part of the Indochina wars, the Cold War in Asia, and the decolonisation of Asia
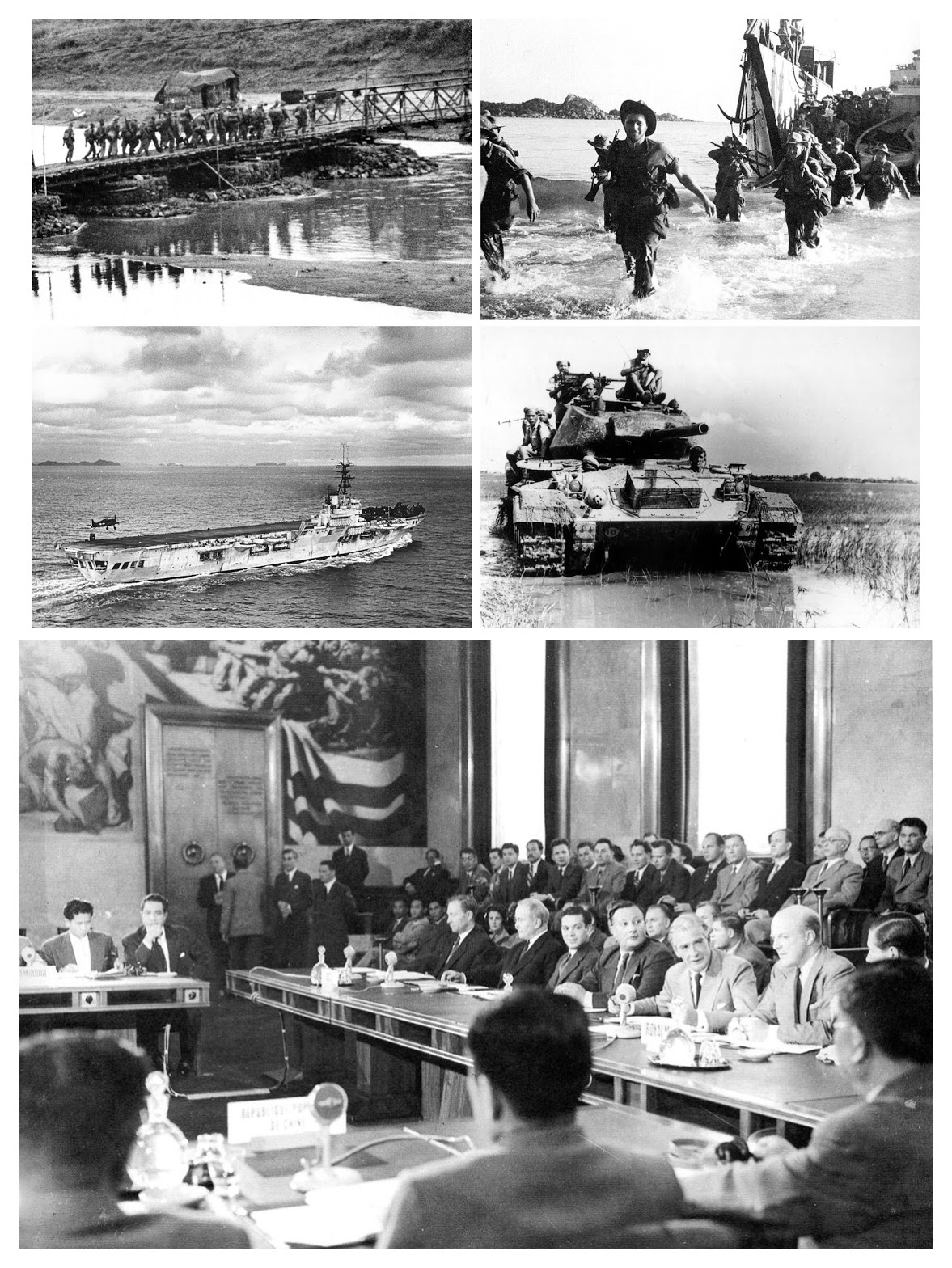
- Clockwise: After the fall of Dien Bien Phu, supporting Laotian troops fall back across the Mekong River into Laos; French Marine commandos wade ashore off the Annam coast in July 1950; M24 Chaffee American light tank used by the French in Vietnam; Geneva Conference on 21 July 1954; A Grumman F6F-5 Hellcat from Escadrille 1F prepares to land on French aircraft carrier Arromanches operating in the Gulf of Tonkin
Date	19 December 1946 – 11 August 1954 (7 years, 7 months and 13 days)
Location	French Indochina
Result	Viet Minh victory
Territorial changes	Dissolution of French Indochina; Partition of Vietnam into North and South Vietnam

Belligerents
Democratic Republic of Vietnam (Viet Minh): People's Army of Vietnam; (Laos) Pathet Lao; United Issarak Front	French Union: France; State of Vietnam; Kingdom of Laos; Kingdom of Cambodia

Commanders and leaders
(North Vietnam) Hồ Chí Minh; Võ Nguyên Giáp; Trường Chinh; Hoàng Văn Thái; (North Vietnam) Phạm Văn Đồng; (Laos) Souphanouvong; Son Ngoc Minh	Thierry d'Argenlieu; Jean Étienne Valluy; Lattre de Tassigny #; Raoul Salan; Henri Navarre; Bảo Đại; Nguyễn Văn Hinh

Strength
Việt Minh: 125,000 regulars; 75,000 regional; 250,000 irregulars; est. 5,000 former Imperial Japanese Army volunteers	France (French Far East Expeditionary Corps): 496,560 main troops (total), including 296,000 Europeans and 183,000 Africans; 190,000 main troops (peak); 55,000 local auxiliary (peak); State of Vietnam (Vietnamese National Army): 150,000 troops

Casualties and losses
Việt Minh: 175,000–300,000 dead or missing (Western historians' estimate); 191,605 dead or missing (Vietnamese government's figure)	France: 74,220 dead (20,685 Frenchmen); 64,127 wounded; State of Vietnam: 58,877 dead or missing
- 400,000–842,707 total killed; 125,000–400,000 civilians killed

The First Indochina War, known alternatively as the French Indochina War, (Note: also referred to as the Resistance War against the French colonialists (Vietnamese: Kháng chiến chống thực dân Pháp) in Vietnam, the Indochina War in France, the Franco–Viet Minh War, or retrospectively the First Vietnam War) was fought in French Indochina between the French Union and the Viet Minh and their respective allies, from 19 December 1946 until 11 August 1954. Most of the engagements of this conflict occurred in Vietnam.

At the Potsdam Conference in July 1945, the Allied Combined Chiefs of Staff decided that Indochina south of latitude 16° north was to be included in the South East Asia Command under British Admiral Mountbatten. On 25 August 1945, Vietnamese Emperor Bảo Đại abdicated, handing power over to the Viet Minh. On 2 September, Ho Chi Minh proclaimed the establishment of the Democratic Republic of Vietnam (DRV). Also in September 1945, Chinese forces entered Hanoi, and Japanese forces north of the 16th parallel surrendered to Generalissimo Chiang Kai-shek. At the same time, British forces landed in Saigon, and Japanese forces in the south surrendered to the British. The Chinese Nationalists acknowledged the DRV and the communist-led Viet Minh, then in power in Hanoi. The British refused to do that in Saigon, in deference to the French.

On 23 September 1945, French forces overthrew the Viet Minh administration in Saigon and declared French authority restored south of the 16th parallel. Guerrilla warfare began around Saigon immediately. After one year of low-level conflicts and failed negotiations, all-out war broke out in December 1946 between French and Viet Minh forces. As part of decolonization, France established the French Union in 1946 and reorganized Indochina in 1949 as a confederation of associated states within it. In June 1949, they united French Cochinchina with the protectorates of Annam and Tonkin to form the State of Vietnam within the French Union, and installed former Emperor Bảo Đại as head of state.

The Chinese Communist victory of 1949 changed the nature of the Indochina War. In 1950, the newly established People's Republic of China and the Soviet Union recognized the DRV while the United States recognized the State of Vietnam. The conflict largely resembled a conventional war between two armies equipped with modern weapons, although guerrilla warfare continued to occur in many areas. The United States provided assistance to France, while China assisted the Viet Minh. French Union forces included colonial troops from the empire – North Africans, Sub-Saharan Africans, Laotian, Cambodian and Vietnamese ethnic minorities – and professional French troops, European volunteers, and units of the Foreign Legion. The use of French metropolitan recruits was forbidden by the government to prevent the war from becoming more unpopular at home. It was called the "dirty war" (la sale guerre) by French leftists. In December 1950, France officially established an army for the State of Vietnam. In September 1951, the US began providing direct economic aid to the State of Vietnam. Segments of the population supported neither the communist Viet Minh nor the French colonialists, and were labeled attentistes. After the internationalization of the war, several among them stepped off the fence and entered the political contest.

The French strategy of inducing the Viet Minh to attack well-defended bases in remote areas at the end of their logistical trails succeeded at the Battle of Nà Sản. French efforts were hampered by the limited usefulness of tanks in forest terrain, the lack of a strong air force, and reliance on soldiers from French colonies. The Viet Minh used novel and efficient tactics, including direct artillery fire, convoy ambushes, and anti-aircraft weaponry to impede land and air resupplies, while recruiting a sizable regular army facilitated by large popular support. They used guerrilla warfare doctrine and instruction from China, and used war materiel provided by the Soviet Union. This combination proved fatal for the French bases, culminating in a decisive French defeat at the Battle of Dien Bien Phu. An estimated 400,000 to 842,707 soldiers died during the war as well as between 125,000 and 400,000 civilians. Both sides committed war crimes, including killings of civilians (such as the Mỹ Trạch massacre by French troops), rape and torture.

The State of Vietnam gained full independence legally in June 1954, although the transfer of power was not yet complete. Despite gaining a great military advantage and controlling most of the country's territory, the Viet Minh had to accept a separation at the 17th parallel due to diplomatic pressure from the Chinese. At the Geneva Conference in July 1954, the new French cabinet of Pierre Mendès France agreed to give the Viet Minh control of North Vietnam, but this was rejected by the State of Vietnam and the US. The Indochinese Federation was dissolved in December 1954. In October 1955, the Republic of Vietnam was formed as a successor state of the State of Vietnam. The Republic of Vietnam withdrew from the French Union in December 1955. The last French troops left the Republic of Vietnam on 28 April 1956. An insurgency, de facto controlled by the communist North, developed against the South Vietnamese government. This conflict, known as the Vietnam War, ended in 1975 with the fall of South Vietnam to the North Vietnamese army.

== Background ==
Indochine physique, 1930

Vietnam was absorbed into French Indochina in stages between 1858 and 1887. Vietnamese nationalism grew until World War II, which provided a break in French control. Early Vietnamese resistance centered on the intellectual Phan Bội Châu. Châu looked to Japan, which had modernized and was one of the few Asian nations to successfully resist European colonization. With Prince Cường Để, Châu started the two organizations in Japan, the Duy Tân hội (Modernistic Association) and Vietnam Cong Hien Hoi.

Due to French pressure, Japan deported Phan Bội Châu to China. Witnessing Sun Yat-sen's Xinhai Revolution, Châu was inspired to commence the Viet Nam Quang Phục Hội movement in Guangzhou. From 1914 to 1917, he was imprisoned by Yuan Shikai's counterrevolutionary government. In 1925, he was captured by French agents in Shanghai and transported to Vietnam. Due to his popularity, Châu was spared from execution and placed under house arrest until his death in 1940.

In September 1940, shortly after its ally Germany had conquered metropolitan France, Japan launched its invasion of French Indochina. The Japanese retained the French colonial administration, ruling from behind the scenes, as did the Germans in Vichy France. For Vietnamese nationalists, this was a double-puppet government, with the Axis powers behind the French behind the Vietnamese local officials. Emperor Bảo Đại collaborated with the Japanese, just as he had with the French, ensuring his continued safety and comfort.

From October 1940 to May 1941, during the Franco-Thai War, the Vichy French in Indochina defended their territories in a border conflict in which the forces of Thailand invaded while the Japanese sat on the sidelines. Thai military successes were limited to the Cambodia–Thailand border area, and in January 1941 Vichy France's modern naval forces soundly defeated the inferior Thai naval forces in the Battle of Ko Chang. The war ended in May, with the French agreeing to minor territorial revisions which restored formerly Thai areas to Thailand.

In 1941, Hồ Chí Minh formed the Viet Minh (League for the Independence of Vietnam). He founded the Việt Minh as an umbrella organization, seeking to appeal to a base beyond his own communist beliefs by emphasizing national liberation instead of class struggle. In 1941, Hồ and the Indochinese Communist Party founded a communist-led united front to oppose the Japanese.

In March 1945, with the World War all but lost, Japan launched a coup d'état to oust the Vichy French, and formally installed Emperor Bảo Đại as head of a nominally independent Vietnam. The Japanese arrested and imprisoned most of the French officials and military remaining in the country.

In Hanoi on 15–20 April 1945, the Tonkin Revolutionary Military Conference of the Việt Minh issued a resolution (reprinted 25 August 1970 in the Nhân Dân journal) calling for a general uprising, resistance and guerrilla warfare against the Japanese. It also called on the French in Vietnam to recognize Vietnamese independence and on the Provisional Government of the French Republic (Allied French) to recognize Vietnam's independence and fight alongside them against Japan.

In an article from August 1945, (republished 17 August 1970), the North Vietnamese National Assembly Chairman Truong Chinh denounced the Japanese Greater East Asia Co-Prosperity Sphere as a regime to plunder Asia and to replace the United States and British colonial rule with Japanese colonial rule. Truong Chinh also denounced the retreating Japanese's Three Alls policy: kill all, burn all, loot all. According to Truong the Japanese also tried to pit different ethnic and political groups within Indochina against each other and attempted to infiltrate the Viet Minh.

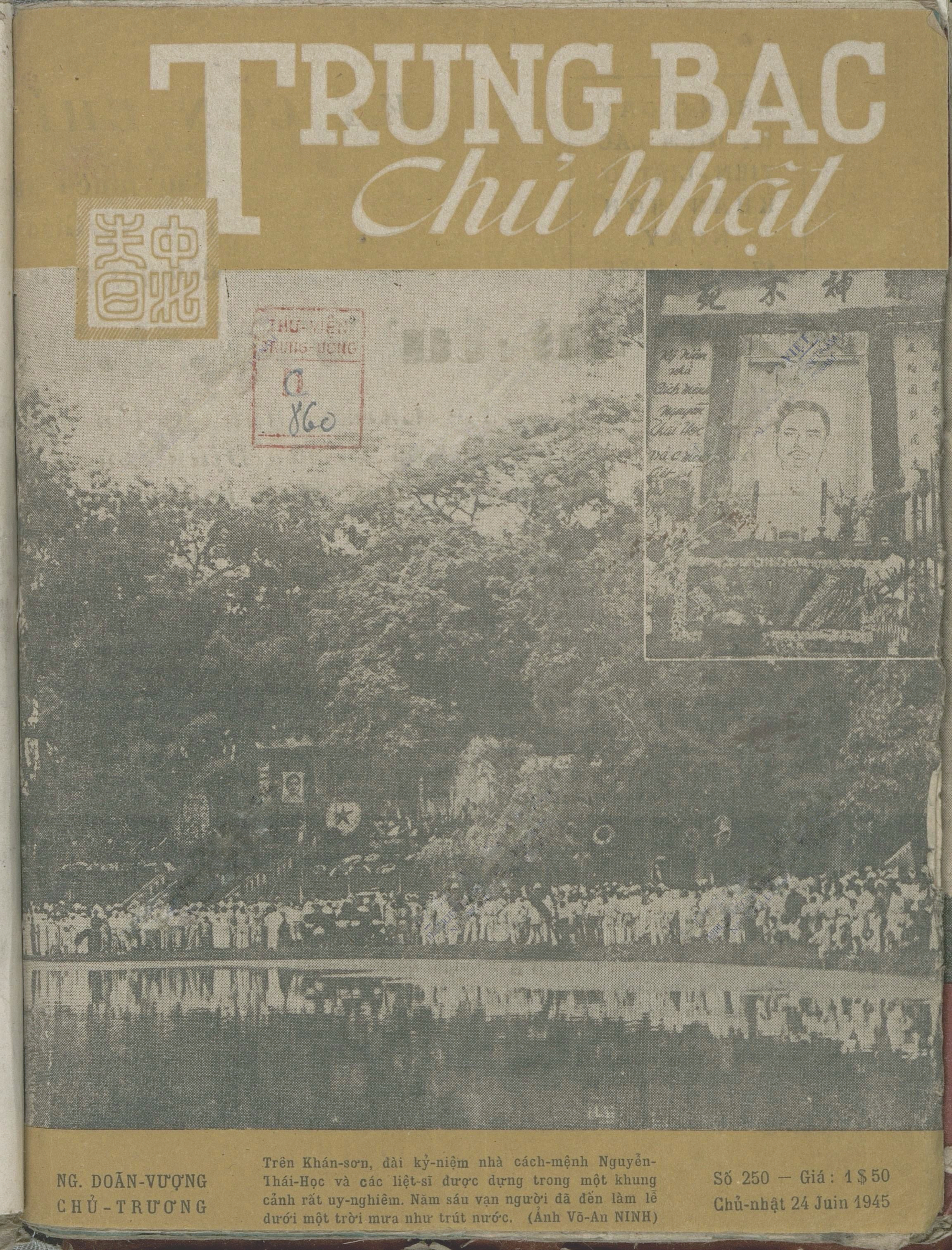
June 1945 public ceremony in commemoration of the Yên Bái mutiny

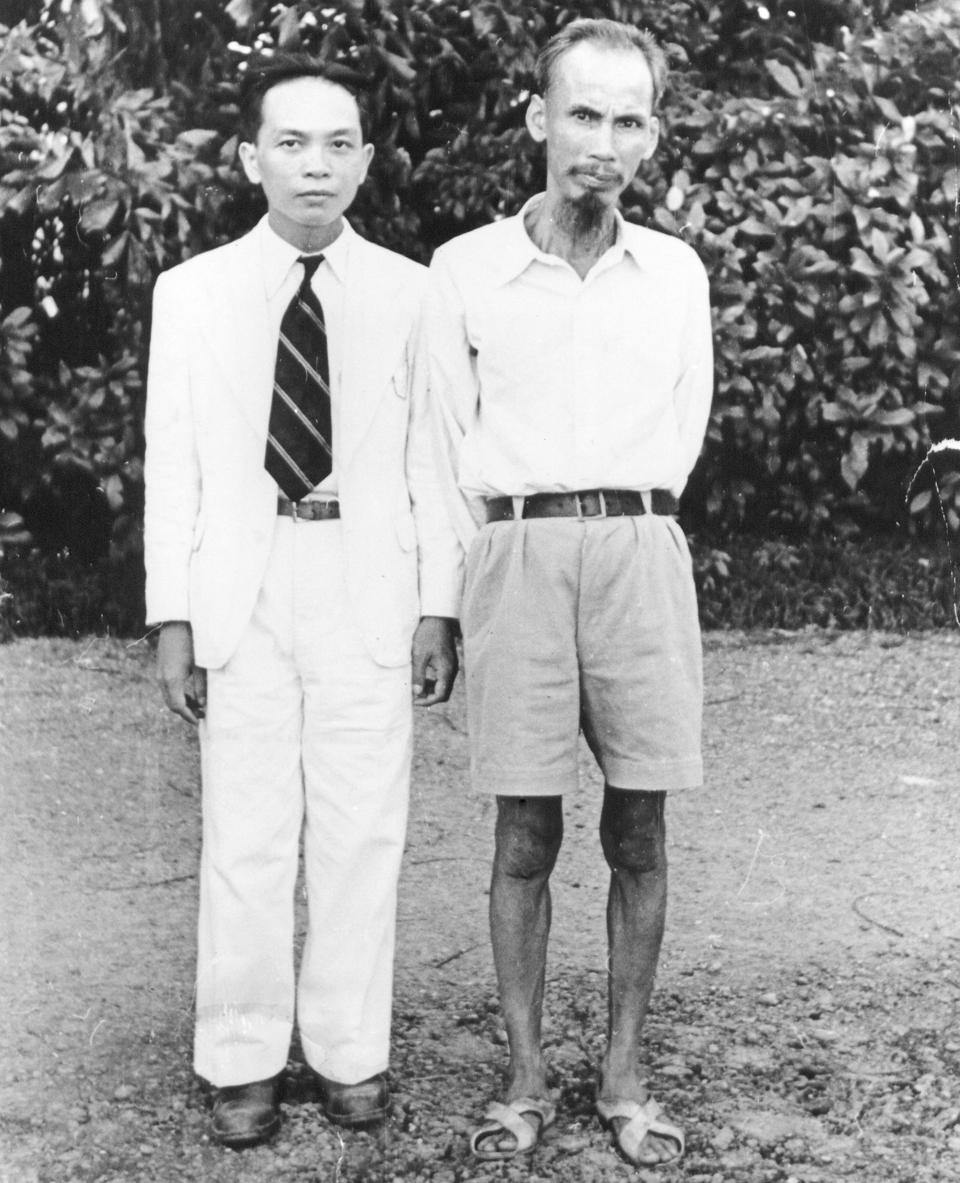
Võ Nguyên Giáp and Ho Chi Minh (1945)

The Japanese inflicted two billion US dollars' worth (1945 value) of damage, including destruction of industrial plants, heavy vehicles, motorcycles, cars, junks, railways, port installations, and one third of the bridges. In the famine of 1944–1945, one to two million Vietnamese starved to death in the Red River Delta of northern Vietnam. The North Vietnamese government accused both France and Japan of the famine. By the time the Chinese came to disarm the Japanese, Vietnamese corpses littered the streets of Hanoi.

In the Declaration of Independence of the Democratic Republic of Vietnam, Ho Chi Minh blamed "the double yoke of the French and the Japanese" for the deaths of "more than two million" Vietnamese.

American President Franklin D. Roosevelt and General Joseph Stilwell privately opposed continued French rule in Indochina after the war. Roosevelt suggested that Chiang Kai-shek place Indochina under Chinese rule; Chiang Kai-shek supposedly replied: "Under no circumstances!" Following Roosevelt's death in April 1945, U.S. resistance to French rule weakened.

=== After the surrender of Japan ===
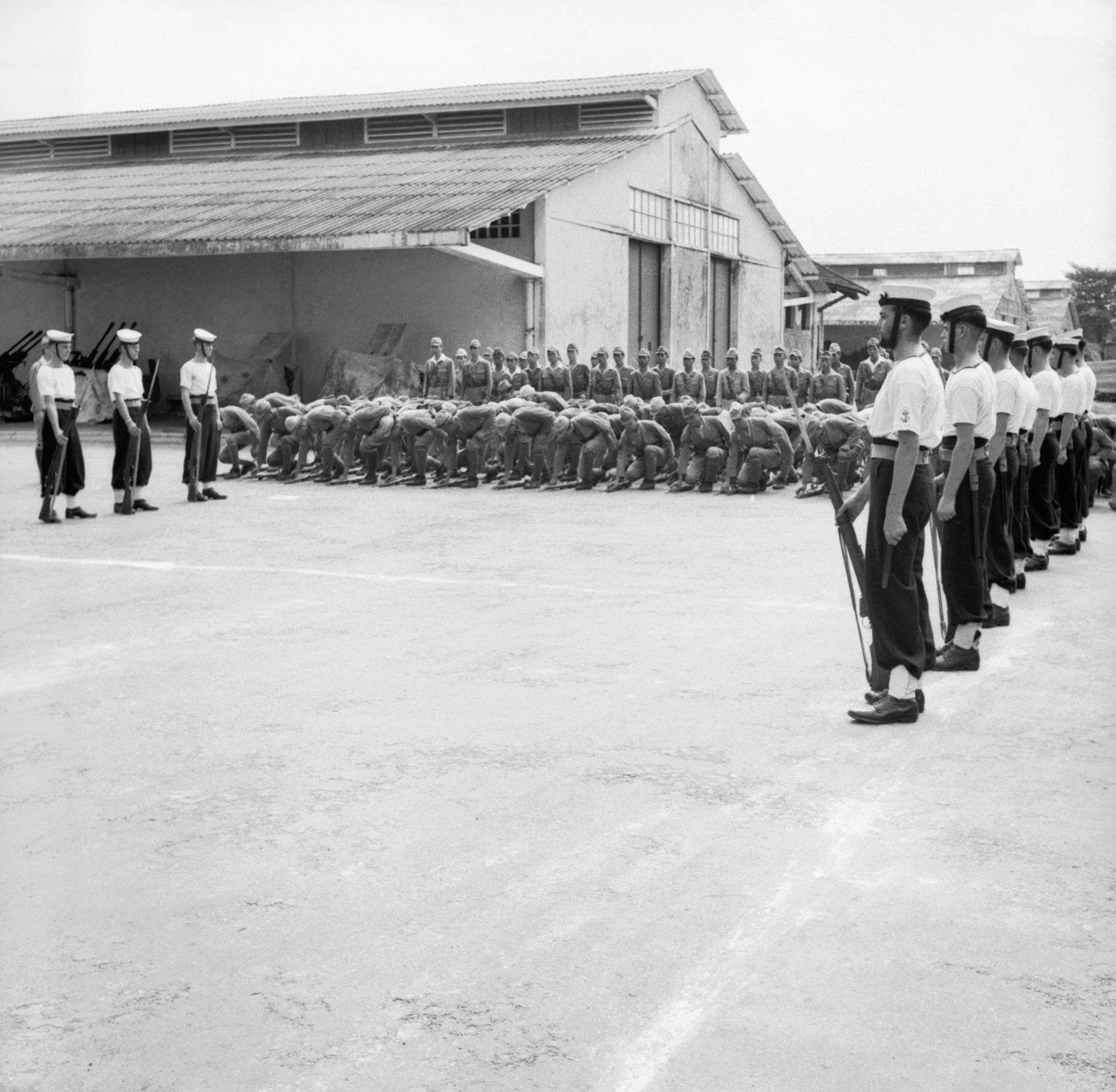
Japanese troops lay down their arms to British troops in a ceremony in Saigon after the surrender of Japan.

Japanese forces in Vietnam surrendered on 15 August 1945, and an armistice was signed between Japan and the United States on 20 August. The Provisional Government of the French Republic wanted to restore its colonial rule in French Indochina as the final step of the Liberation of France. On 22 August, OSS agents Archimedes Patti and Carleton B. Swift Jr. arrived in Hanoi on a mercy mission to liberate Allied POWs, accompanied by French official Jean Sainteny. As the only law enforcement, the Imperial Japanese Army remained in power, keeping French colonial troops and Sainteny detained, to the benefit of the developing Vietnamese nationalist forces. The Viet Minh claimed that they, alongside Meo (Hmong) and Muong tribesmen, subdued the Japanese in a nationwide rebellion from 9 March to 19 August 1945, taking control of 6 provinces, although some of these claims are contested. Beginning with the August Revolution, Japanese forces allowed the Việt Minh and other nationalist groups to take over public buildings and weapons. For the most part, the Japanese Army destroyed their equipment or surrendered it to Allied forces, but some of the weapons fell to the Việt Minh, including some French equipment. The Việt Minh also recruited more than 600 Japanese soldiers to train Vietnamese.

On 25 August, Ho Chi Minh persuaded Emperor Bảo Đại to abdicate and become "supreme advisor" to the new Việt Minh-led government in Hanoi. On September 2, aboard USS Missouri in Tokyo Bay, CEFEO Expeditionary Corps leader General Leclerc signed the armistice with Japan on behalf of France. The same day, Ho Chi Minh declared Vietnam's independence from France. Deliberately echoing the American Declaration of Independence, he proclaimed:

We hold the truth that all men are created equal, that they are endowed by their Creator with certain unalienable rights, among them life, liberty and the pursuit of happiness.

Ho Chi Minh denounced the reimposition of French rule, accusing the French of selling out the Vietnamese to the Japanese twice in four years.

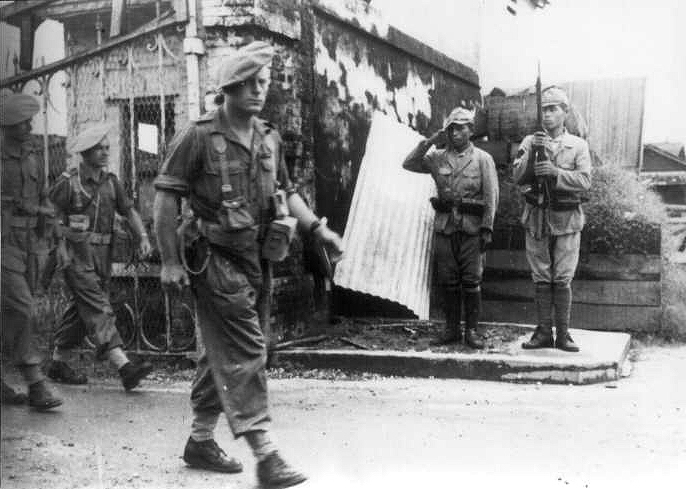
6° Commando of the C.L.I. (Corps Léger d'Intervention) in Indochina.

On 13 September 1945, a Franco-British task force landed in Java, main island of the Dutch East Indies (for which independence was being sought by Sukarno), and Saigon, capital of Cochinchina (southern part of French Indochina), both being occupied by the Japanese under Field Marshal Hisaichi Terauchi, Commander-in-Chief of Japan's Southern Expeditionary Army Group based in Saigon. Allied troops in Saigon were an airborne detachment, two British companies of the Indian 20th Infantry Division and the French 5th Colonial Infantry Regiment, with British General Sir Douglas Gracey as supreme commander. The latter proclaimed martial law on September 21, and Franco-British troops took control of Saigon.

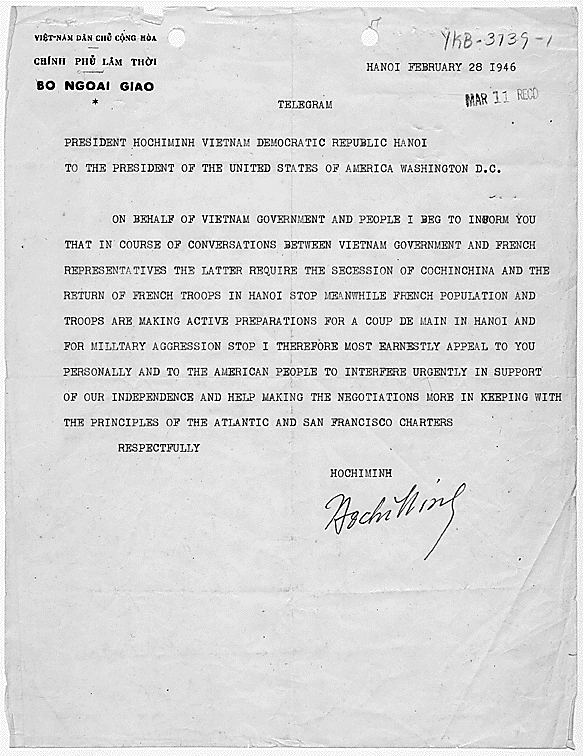
Telegram from Ho Chi Minh to U.S. President Harry S. Truman requesting support for independence (Hanoi, February 28, 1946)

As agreed at the Potsdam Conference, 200,000 troops of the Chinese 1st Army occupied northern Indochina to the 16th parallel, while the British under the South-East Asia Command of Lord Mountbatten occupied the south. The Chinese troops had been sent by Chiang Kai-shek under General Lu Han to accept the surrender of Japanese forces occupying that area, then to supervise the disarming and repatriation of the Japanese Army. In the North, the Chinese permitted the DRV government to remain in charge of local administration and food supply. Initially, the Chinese kept the French Colonial soldiers interned, with the acquiescence of the Americans. The Chinese used the VNQDĐ, the Vietnamese branch of the Chinese Kuomintang, to increase their influence in Indochina and put pressure on their opponents. Chiang Kai-shek deliberately withheld his best soldiers from Vietnam, holding them in reserve for the fight against the Communists inside China, and instead sent undisciplined warlord troops from Yunnan under Lu Han to occupy Vietnam north of the 16th parallel and accept the Japanese surrender. In total, 200,000 of General Lu Han's Chinese soldiers occupied north Vietnam starting August 1945. 90,000 arrived by October, the 62nd army came on 26 September to Nam Dinh and Haiphong, later arriving at Lang Son and Cao Bang and the Red River region and Lai Cai were occupied by a column from Yunnan. Vietnamese VNQDD fighters accompanied the Chinese soldiers. Lu Han occupied the French governor general's palace after ejecting the French staff under Sainteny.

On 9 October 1945, General Leclerc arrived in Saigon, accompanied by French Colonel Massu's Groupement de marche unit. Leclerc's primary objectives were to restore public order in south Vietnam and to militarize Tonkin (northern Vietnam). Secondary objectives were to explore taking back Chinese-occupied Hanoi, and to negotiate with Việt Minh officials.

While the Chinese soldiers occupied northern Indochina, Ho Chi Minh's Viet Minh tried to appease the Chinese soldiers with welcome parades in Hanoi and Haiphong, while reassuring the Vietnamese people that China supported Vietnam's independence. Viet Minh newspapers emphasized the common ancestry (huyết thống) and culture shared by Vietnamese and Chinese, and their common struggle against western imperialists, and expressed admiration for the 1911 revolution and anti-Japanese war which had made it "not the same as feudal China".

In September 1945, Ho Chi Minh called on the people to contribute gold to purchase weapons for the Viet Minh and also gifts for the Chinese, presenting a golden opium pipe to the Chinese general Lu Han. Lu Han pressured Ho Chi Minh for rice to feed the Chinese occupation force. Rice sent to Cochinchina by the French in October 1945 was divided by Ho Chi Minh, with only one third to the northern Vietnamese and two thirds to the Chinese. After 18 December 1945, elections were postponed for 15 days in response to a demand by Chinese general Chen Xiuhe to allow the Dong Minh Hoi and VNQDD to prepare.

Beyond their food quota, the occupiers seized several rice stockpiles and other private and public goods, and were accused of rapes, beatings, occupying private dwellings, and burning down others, resulting only in apologies or partial compensation. By contrast, Vietnamese crimes against the Chinese were fully investigated, to the extent of executions for some Vietnamese who attacked Chinese soldiers.

While Chiang Kai-shek, Xiao Wen (Hsiao Wen) and the Kuomintang Chinese government were uninterested in occupying Vietnam beyond the allotted time period and involving itself in the war between the Viet Minh and the French, the Yunnan warlord Lu Han wanted to establish a Chinese trusteeship of Vietnam under the principles of the Atlantic Charter with the aim of eventually preparing Vietnam for independence. Ho Chi Minh sent a cable on 17 October 1945 to American President Harry S. Truman calling on him, Generalissimo Chiang Kai-shek, Premier Joseph Stalin and Prime Minister Clement Attlee to go to the United Nations against France and demand that they not be allowed to return to occupy Vietnam, accusing France of having sold out and cheated the Allies by surrendering Indochina to Japan. Ho Chi Minh blamed Dong Minh Hoi and VNDQQ for signing the agreement with France which allowed its soldiers to return to Vietnam.

Chinese communist guerrilla leader Chu Chia-pi visited northern Vietnam multiple times in 1945 and helped the Viet Minh fight against the French from Yunnan.

Chiang Kai-shek forced the contentious French and Việt Minh to come to terms in the Ho–Sainteny agreement. In February 1946, he also forced the French to surrender all of their concessions and ports in China, including Shanghai, in exchange for Chinese troops withdrawing from northern Indochina and allowing French troops to reoccupy the region starting in March 1946.

This left the VNQDĐ without support, and they were suppressed by Việt Minh and French troops. The Việt Minh massacred thousands of VNQDĐ members and other nationalists in a large-scale purge.

=== Intra-Vietnamese conflicts ===
In 1945, the Vietnamese were locked in a struggle over the destiny of their post-colonial state after the ousting of the French and the surrender of Japan. Viet Minh forces seized control from the collapsing Empire of Vietnam, while the Vietnam Nationalist Party and Việt Cách advanced in Tonkin with the support of the Chinese Allied mission, and the Đại Việt Nationalist Party already posed serious competition to the Viet Minh. The South fractured between the Stalinist front Viet Minh and rival groups including the Trotskyists, Hòa Hảo, Cao Đài, and Bình Xuyên.

The Indochinese Communist Party was primarily responsible for starting widespread Vietnamese-on-Vietnamese violence. Its Viet Minh front aimed to consolidate power through the terrorization and purging of the rival Vietnamese groups. In 1946, the Franco-Chinese and Ho–Sainteny Agreements enabled French forces to replace the Chinese north of the 16th parallel and facilitated a coexistence between the DRV and the French that strengthened the Viet Minh while undermining the nationalists. That summer, the Viet Minh colluded with French forces to eliminate nationalists, targeted for their ardent anti-colonialism. By eliminating the nationalist parties, the Viet Minh had undermined Vietnam's broader ability to resist French reconquest.

The Bình Xuyên organized crime group also sought power in the country and although they initially fought alongside the Việt Minh, they would later support Bảo Đại. Militias from the Cao Đài sect, which had initially joined the Viet Minh in their struggle against the return of the French, made a truce with France when their leader was captured on 6 June 1946. The Viet Minh later attacked the Cao Đài after open conflict had erupted with France, which led them to join the French side. The Viet Minh assassinated the Hòa Hảo leader Huỳnh Phú Sổ in April 1947. Vietnamese society also polarized along ethnic lines: the Nùng and Chinese Nùng minority assisted the French, while the Tày assisted the Việt Minh. The Khmer Krom also sided with France.

Surviving Vietnamese nationalist partisans and politico-religious groups rallied behind the exiled Bảo Đại to reopen negotiations with France in opposition to communist domination. The State of Vietnam (SVN), with Bảo Đại as Chief of State, was established and positioned within the anticommunist Western Bloc. With the recognition of the DRV by China and the Soviet Union, and the recognition of the SVN by the United States in 1950, the civil war and the colonial war in Vietnam became internationalized and intertwined with the global Cold War.

== Course of the war ==
=== War breaks out (1946) ===
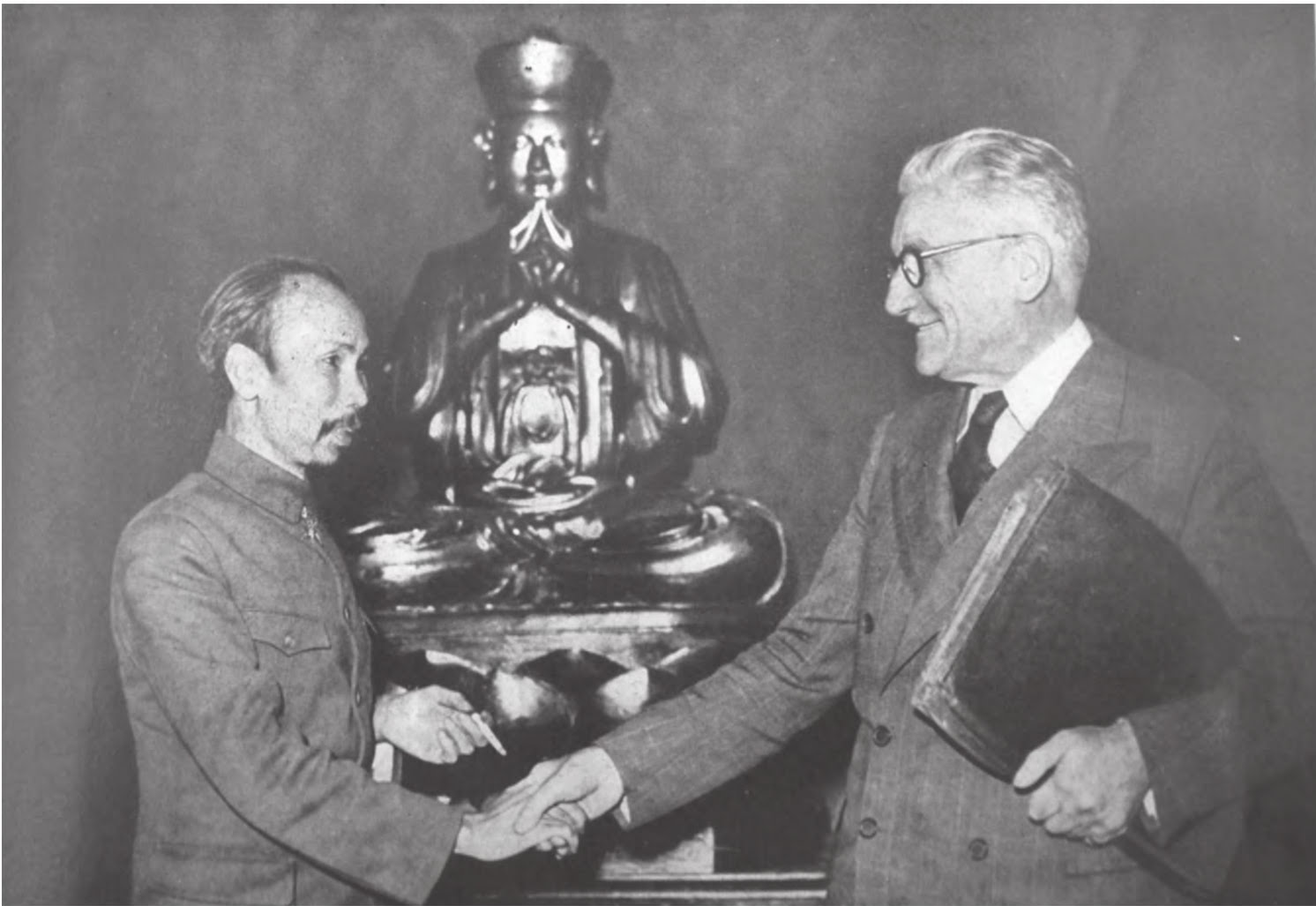
Ho Chi Minh and Marius Moutet shaking hands after signing modus vivendi 1946 after Fontainebleau Agreements

In March 1946, a preliminary accord signed between the French and Ho Chi Minh which acknowledged the DRV as a free state within an Indochinese Federation in a "French Union" and allowed a limited number of French troops within its borders to replace the Chinese forces which started gradually returning to China. In further negotiations, the French would seek to ratify Vietnam's position within the Union and the Vietnamese main priorities were preserving their independence and the reunification with the Republic of Cochinchina, which had been created by High Commissioner Georges d'Argenlieu in June. In September, once main negotiations had broken down in Paris over these two key issues, Ho Chi Minh and Marius Moutet, the French Minister of the Colonies, signed a temporary modus vivendi which reaffirmed the March Accord, although no specifications were made on the issue of a Nam Bộ (Cochinchina) reunification referendum and negotiations for a definitive treaty were set to begin no later than January 1947.

In the north, an uneasy peace had been maintained during the negotiations, in November however, fighting broke out in Haiphong between the Việt Minh government and the French over a conflict of interest in import duty at the port. On November 23, 1946, the French fleet bombarded the Vietnamese sections of the city killing 6,000 Vietnamese civilians in one afternoon. The Việt Minh quickly agreed to a cease-fire and left the cities. This is known as the Haiphong incident. There was never any intention among the Vietnamese to give up, as General Võ Nguyên Giáp soon brought up 30,000 men to attack the city. Although the French were outnumbered, their superior weaponry and naval support made any Việt Minh attack unsuccessful. On 19 December, hostilities between the Việt Minh and the French broke out in Hanoi, and Ho Chi Minh, along with his government, was forced to evacuate the capital in favor of remote forested and mountainous areas. Guerrilla warfare ensued, with the French controlling most of the country except far-flung areas. By January the following year, most provincial capitals had fallen to the French, while Hue fell in February after a six-week siege.

=== French offensives, creation of the State of Vietnam (1947–1949) ===
"Envoys probe Indo-China rebellion" (January 16, 1947), Universal Newsreel

In 1947, Ho Chi Minh and General Võ Nguyên Giáp retreated with his command into the Việt Bắc, the mountainous forests of northern Vietnam. By March, France had taken control of the main population centers in the country. The French chose not to pursue the Việt Minh before the beginning of the seasonal rains in May, and military operations were postponed until their conclusion.

Come October, the French launched Operation Léa with the objective of swiftly putting an end to the resistance movement by taking out the Vietnamese main battle units and the Việt Minh leadership at their base in Bắc Kạn. Léa was followed by Operation Ceinture in November, with similar aims. As a result of the French offensive, the Việt Minh would end up losing valuable resources and suffering heavy losses, 7,200–9,500 KIA. Nevertheless, both operations failed to capture Ho Chi Minh and his key lieutenants as intended, and the main Vietnamese battle units managed to survive.

In 1948, France started looking for means of opposing the Việt Minh politically, with an alternative government led by former emperor Bảo Đại to lead an "autonomous" government within the French Union of nations. This new state ruled over northern and central Vietnam, excluding the colony of Cochinchina, and had limited autonomy. This initial accord with the French was decried by non-Communist nationalists and Bảo Đại withdrew from the agreement. It would not be until March 1949 that the French would concede on the issue of unification and a final agreement would be reached.

Two years prior, the French had refused Ho's proposal of a similar status within the French Union, albeit with some restrictions on French power and the latter's eventual withdrawal from Vietnam. However, they were willing to deal with Bảo Đại as he represented a non-radical option who could rally behind him the non-Communist nationalist movement. In January 1950, France officially recognized the nominal "independence" of the unified State of Vietnam, led by Bảo Đại, as an associated state within the French Union. However, France still controlled all foreign policy, every defense issue and would have a French Union army stationed in the country with complete freedom of movement. Within the framework of the French Union, France also granted independence to the other nations in Indochina, the Kingdoms of Laos and Cambodia.

In January 1949, the Vietnamese National Army was created to go along the formation of the new Vietnamese associated state. This was meant to bolster French numbers as their army found itself outnumbered by the People's Army of Vietnam at this point in the war. To this end, the CEFEO provided some of its officers to lead these new divisions.

=== Việt Minh reorganization (1949–1950) ===
A map of dissident activities in Indochina in 1950

Throughout 1948 and 1949, the Việt Minh engaged in ambushes and sabotage of French convoys and infrastructure. Meanwhile, the French government was still looking for a political solution and major military operations stalled for a lack of manpower. With the triumph of the communists in China's civil war in October 1949, the Vietnamese communists gained a major political ally on their northern border, who supported them with advisers, weapons and supplies along with camps where new recruits were trained. Between 1950 and 1951, Giap re-organized his local forces into five full conventional infantry divisions, the 304th, 308th, 312th, 316th and the 320th.

In January 1950, Ho's government gained recognition from China and the Soviet Union. Shortly after in February, the government of Bảo Đại gained recognition by the United States and the United Kingdom. Along with Mao Zedong's victory in China, this gesture by the main Communist powers, played a part in shifting the US view of the war, which began to be seen as part of the global struggle against Communism. Starting in May, the United States began to provide military aid to France in the form of weaponry and military observers.

In June 1950, the Korean War broke out between communist North Korea (DPRK) supported by China and the Soviet Union, and South Korea (ROK) supported by the United States and its allies in the UN. The Cold War was turning 'hot' in East Asia, and the American government feared communist domination of the entire region would have deep implications for American interests. The US became strongly opposed to the government of Ho Chi Minh, in part, because it was supported and supplied by China. Throughout 1950, the DRV would seek to secure its control over the Chinese border, which would allow for a greater flow of supplies. In February, Giáp launched "Operation Lê Hong Phong I", taking control of the border town of Lào Cai, in the high valley of the Red River and by April, most of the northeastern border was under Viet-Minh control, save for a string of posts along the eastern Tonkinese frontier; Cao Bằng, Đông Khê, Thất Khê and Lạng Sơn, from North to South, connected by the Colonial Route 4 (RC 4).

On September 16 the Viet Minh launched a new offensive, "Operation Lê Hong Phong II", along this route under the command of General Hoàng Văn Thái. The Viet Minh attacked Đông Khê, which fell two days later. In response, the French decided to evacuate Cao Bằng, which had become isolated. Soldiers and civilians were to march south and join a group marching north from Thất Khê tasked with recapturing the lost position. However, despite having been ordered to destroy all equipment, the commander of the Cao Bằng force decided to bring along its artillery when they left on October 3, causing delays and making them vulnerable to ambushes. The two forces approached Đông Khê four days later but by were eventually encircled and defeated. This operation would cost the French around 6,000 soldiers. On October 17, faced with the PAVN's demonstrated ability to fight a conventional battle, the French command decided to abandon Lạng Sơn before it could come under attack, leaving behind considerable amounts of military supplies. The Viet-Minh now controlled most of the northern half of Tonkin.

=== Establishment of communist forces of Cambodia and Laos (1950) ===
==== United Issarak Front ====
In 1950, as a representative of the Cambodia communist, Son Ngoc Minh met Viet Minh's representatives at Hatien, southern Vietnam, which near Cambodian border. He analysed the revolutionary situation in Cambodia and stated due to the weak "principle force", Cambodia could hardly have a revolution. In April 17–19, 1950, the "First National Congress of Khmer Resistance" was held in Kampot, Cambodia. On the meeting, United Issarak Front and People's Liberation Central Committee (PLCC) was founded. Minh was the president of the PLCC. Two months later, as the Viet Minh guided-Issarak controlled one third of the Cambodian territory, Minh declared Cambodia's independence, three years before Sihanouk's government gained independence from France.

==== Pathet Lao ====
In August 1950, the Lao Prince Souphanouvong convened the first congress of the Pathet Lao, which was supported by Viet Minh and served as the vehicle for the communist challenge to French rule. On 13 August 1950, he was elected President of the Congress of the Pathet Lao, which met at the Việt Minh headquarters in Tuyen Quang, North Vietnam. In 1953, Pathet Lao fighters accompanied an invasion of Laos from Vietnam led by Viet Minh forces; they established a government at Viengxay in Houaphanh province, northeast Laos.

=== Renewed French success (January–June 1951) ===
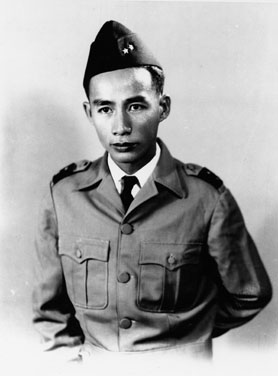
General Trình Minh Thế

A new French commander in chief and high commissioner, General Jean Marie de Lattre de Tassigny, was appointed in December 1950. With him began the construction of a defensive line of fortifications around the Red River Delta, to protect against Việt Minh incursions and against a possible Chinese invasion. It became known as the De Lattre Line. In 1950 and 1951, de Lattre implemented scorched earth tactics in an effort to limit Việt Minh access to food and other supplies. French forces burned crops in areas of Việt Minh activity. These tactics increased the anger of the Vietnamese people against the French and were a strategic failure.

In late 1950 Giáp decided to go on a "general counteroffensive", seeking the final defeat of the French. On January 13, 1951, he moved the 308th and 312th Divisions, with more than 20,000 men, to attack Vĩnh Yên, 30 miles (48 km) northwest of Hanoi, which was manned by 6,000 French troops. Considered the first set-piece battle of the war, the Vietnamese saw initial success, although as the battle progressed, French aerial supremacy proved decisive as reinforcements flew in from the rest of Indochina and all available aircraft capable of dropping bombs was utilized to carry out what would be the largest aerial bombardment of the war. By noon of January 17, Giáp's troops withdrew in defeat. The Vietnamese had suffered 5,000–6,000 deaths and 500 combatants were captured.

Giáp tried again to break the French defensive line, this time 20 miles (32 km) north-east of Haiphong in an attempt to cut the French access to the port city. On March 23, the Việt Minh's 316th Division, composed of 11,000 men, with the partly rebuilt 308th and 312th Divisions in reserve, launched an attack on Mạo Khê. With instances of hand-to-hand combat, the French, supported by paratroopers and naval artillery, repelled the attack and the Vietnamese were beaten by the morning of March 28. About 1,500 – 3,000 Việt Minh soldiers were killed.

Giáp launched yet another attack, the Battle of the Day River, on May 29 with the 304th Division at Phủ Lý, the 308th Division at Ninh Bình, and the main attack delivered by the 320th Division at Phát Diệm south of Hanoi. The attacks fared no better and the three divisions lost heavily. Taking advantage of this, de Lattre mounted his counteroffensive against the demoralized Việt Minh, driving them back into the forests and eliminating the enemy pockets in the Red River Delta by June 18, costing the Việt Minh over 10,000 killed.

Every effort by Võ Nguyên Giáp to break the De Lattre Line failed, and every attack he made was answered by a French counter-attack that destroyed his forces. Việt Minh casualties rose alarmingly during this period, leading some to question the leadership of the Communist government, even within the party. However, any benefit this may have reaped for France was negated by the increasing domestic opposition to the war in France.

=== Stalemate (July 1951–1953) ===
On July 31, French General Charles Chanson was assassinated during a propaganda suicide attack at Sa Đéc in South Vietnam that was blamed on the Việt Minh although it was argued in some quarters that Cao Đài nationalist Trình Minh Thế could have been involved in its planning.

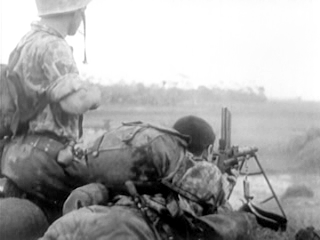
French foreign airborne 1st BEP firing with an FM 24/29 light machine gun during an ambush (1952)

Following the Viet Minh's defeats on the Hanoi perimeter, De Lattre decided to seize the city of Hòa Bình, 20 miles (32 km) west of the De Lattre Line, in an attempt to hinder the flow of supplies between Tonkin, which received direct Chinese support, and central and southern Vietnam. It also aimed to maintain the allegiance of the Muong troops. The city was captured by a parachute drop on November 14.

The ensuing battle became increasingly costly to the French and after De Lattre fell ill from cancer and returned to Paris for treatment where he would die shortly thereafter in January 1952, his replacement as the overall commander of French forces in Indochina, General Raoul Salan, decided to pull back from the Hòa Bình salient. The French lost nearly 5,000 men and the Viet Minh "at least that number" according to historian Phillip P. Davidson, while Spencer C. Tucker claims 894 French killed and missing and 9,000 Viet Minh casualties. This campaign showed that the war was far from over.

Throughout the war theater, the Việt Minh cut French supply lines and wore down the resolve of the French forces. There were continued raids, skirmishes and guerrilla attacks, but through most of the rest of the year each side withdrew to prepare for larger operations. In the Battle of Nà Sản, starting on October 2, French commanders began using "hedgehog" tactics, consisting in setting up well-defended outposts to get the Việt Minh out of the forests and force them to fight conventional battles instead of using guerrilla tactics.

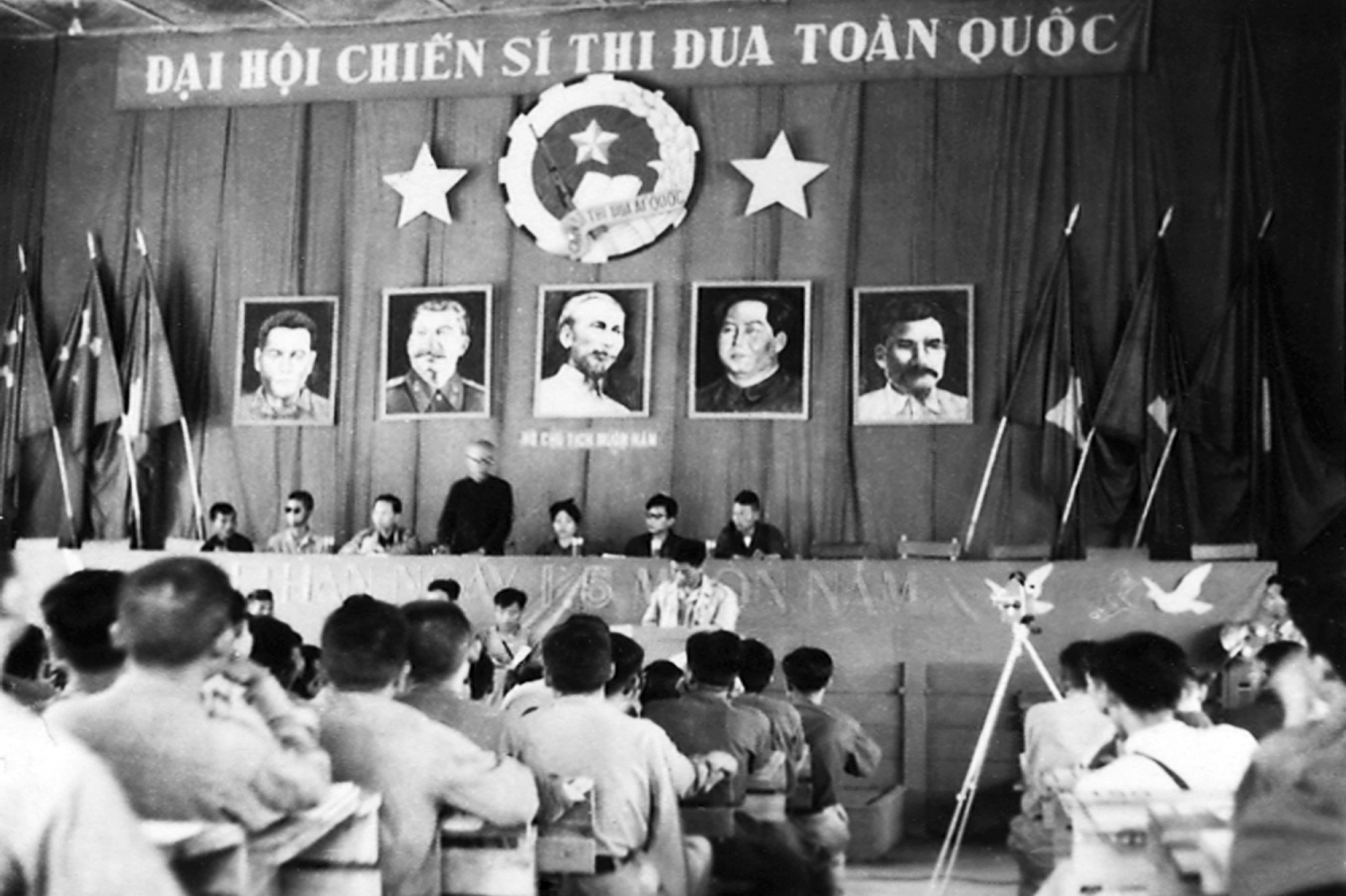
First Congress of Emulation Fighters, held in Thái Nguyên, 1952

On October 17, 1952, Giáp launched attacks against the French garrisons along Nghĩa Lộ, northwest of Hanoi, and overran much of the Black River valley, except for the airfield of Nà Sản where a strong French garrison entrenched. Giáp by now had control over most of Tonkin beyond the De Lattre Line. Raoul Salan, seeing the situation as critical, launched Operation Lorraine along the Clear River to force Giáp to relieve pressure on the Nghĩa Lộ outposts. On October 29, 1952, in the largest operation in Indochina to date, 30,000 French Union soldiers moved out from the De Lattre Line to attack the Việt Minh supply dumps at Phú Yên. Salan took Phú Thọ on November 5, and Phu Doan on November 9 by a parachute drop, and finally Phú Yên on November 13. Giáp at first did not react to the French offensive. He planned to wait until their supply lines were overextended and then cut them off from the Red River Delta.

Salan correctly guessed what the Việt Minh were up to and cancelled the operation on November 14, beginning to withdraw back to the De Lattre Line. The only major fighting during the operation came during the withdrawal, when the Việt Minh ambushed the French column at Chan Muong on November 17. The road was cleared after a bayonet charge by the Indochinese March Battalion, and the withdrawal could continue. The French lost around 1,200 men during the whole operation, most of them during the Chan Muong ambush. The operation was partially successful, proving that the French could strike out at targets outside the De Lattre Line. However, it failed to divert the Việt Minh offensive or seriously damage its logistical network.

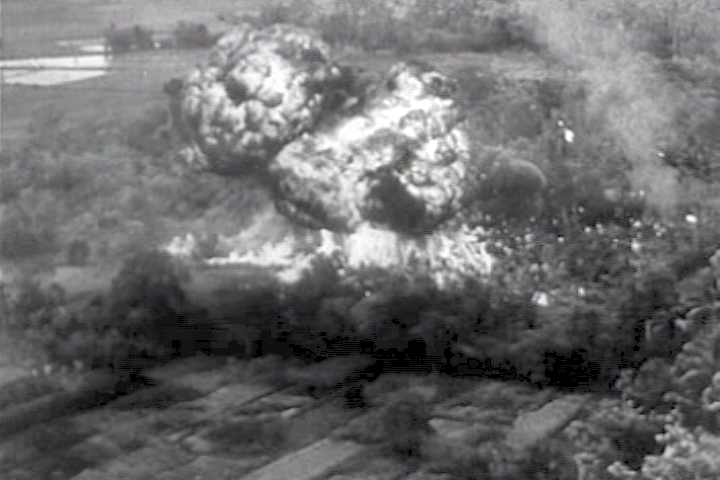
A Bearcat naval fighter aircraft of the Aéronavale drops napalm on Việt Minh Division 320th's artillery during Operation Mouette (November 1953)

On April 9, 1953, Giáp, after having failed repeatedly in direct attacks on French positions in Vietnam, changed strategy and began to pressure the French by invading Laos, surrounding and defeating several French outposts such as Muong Khoua. In May, General Henri Navarre replaced Salan as supreme commander of French forces in Indochina. He reported to the French government "... that there was no possibility of winning the war in Indo-China", saying that the best the French could hope for was a stalemate.

Through the Navarre Plan, French forces and the Vietnamese National Army sought to use their advantage in technology and arms to hold cities and key roads, thereby hoping to force the Việt Minh into an impasse and negotiation. Per this strategy, French forces fortified the town of Điện Biên Phủ in an effort to block the Việt Minh's connections with Laos and Việt Minh bases there. The town was located along a main route between Hanoi and Vientiane and was ringed by mountains.

Operation Castor was launched on November 20, 1953, with 1,800 men of the French 1st and 2nd Airborne Battalions dropping into the valley of Điện Biên Phủ and sweeping aside the local Việt Minh garrison. The paratroopers gained control of a heart-shaped valley 12 miles (19 km) long and 8 miles (13 km) wide surrounded by heavily wooded mountains. Encountering little opposition, the French and Tai units operating from Lai Châu to the north patrolled the mountains.

The operation was a tactical success for the French. However, Giáp, seeing the weakness of the French position, started moving most of his forces from the De Lattre Line to Điện Biên Phủ. From December 1953 to March 1954, the Việt Minh concentrated more than 40,000 troops to encircle the 15,000 French troops at Điện Biên Phủ.

The fight for control of Điện Biên Phủ was the longest and hardest battle for the French Far East Expeditionary Corps and its veterans described the battle as "57 Days of Hell".

=== French defeat at Dien Bien Phu (1954) ===
Map of the war in 1954: Orange = Areas under Việt Minh control. Purple = Areas under French control. White-dotted hatch = Areas of Việt Minh guerrilla encampment and fighting.

The Battle of Dien Bien Phu took place in 1954 between Việt Minh forces under Võ Nguyên Giáp, supported by China and the Soviet Union, and the French Union's French Far East Expeditionary Corps, supported by US financing and Indochinese allies. The battle was fought near the village of Điện Biên Phủ in northern Vietnam and became the last major battle between the French and the Vietnamese in the First Indochina War.

The battle began on March 13 when the Việt Minh began attacks to isolate French strong points at Điện Biên Phủ . Việt Minh artillery damaged both the main and secondary airfields that the French were using to fly in supplies. With French supply lines interrupted, the French position became untenable, particularly when the advent of the monsoon season made dropping supplies and reinforcements by parachute difficult. By late April, French forces held only three strong points. With defeat imminent, the French sought to hold on until the opening of the Geneva peace meeting on April 26. The last French offensive took place on May 4, but it was ineffective. The Việt Minh then began to hammer the outpost with newly supplied Soviet Katyusha rockets.

On May 6, the Việt Minh began their final attack. French forces were eventually overrun by a huge frontal assault. General Cogny, based in Hanoi, ordered General de Castries, who was commanding the outpost, to cease fire at 5:30 pm and to destroy all matériel (weapons, transmissions, etc.) to deny their use to the enemy. A formal order was given to not use the white flag so that the action would be considered a ceasefire instead of a surrender. Much of the fighting ended on May 7; however, the ceasefire was not respected on Isabelle, the isolated southern position, where the battle lasted until May 8, 1:00 am. At least 2,200 members of the 20,000-strong French forces died, and another 1,729 were reported missing after the battle, and 11,721 were captured. The Viet Minh suffered approximately 25,000 casualties over the course of the battle, with as many as 10,000 Viet Minh personnel having been killed in the battle. The French prisoners taken at Điện Biên Phủ were the greatest number the Việt Minh had ever captured: one-third of the total captured during the entire war.

Dien Bien Phu was a serious defeat for the French and was the decisive battle of the Indochina war. The battle would thus heavily influence the outcome of the 1954 Geneva accords.

=== Geneva Conference ===
Negotiations between France and the Viet Minh began in Geneva in May 1954 at the Geneva Conference, during which time the French Union and the Viet Minh were fighting a battle at Dien Bien Phu. In France, Pierre Mendès France was elected as Prime Minister on 17 June 1954 on a promise to achieve a ceasefire in four months.

=== End of the war ===
One month after Đien Bien Phu, the composite Groupe Mobile 100 (GM100) of the French Union forces evacuated the An Khê outpost. They were ambushed by a larger Viet Minh force at the Battle of Mang Yang Pass on 24 June and again at the Battle of Chu Dreh Pass on 17 July, suffering heavy losses. This was the last battle of the war, as the Geneva accords were signed four days later, and the final ceasefire took effect on 11 August 1954.

== Aftermath ==
=== Implementation of the Geneva Accords ===
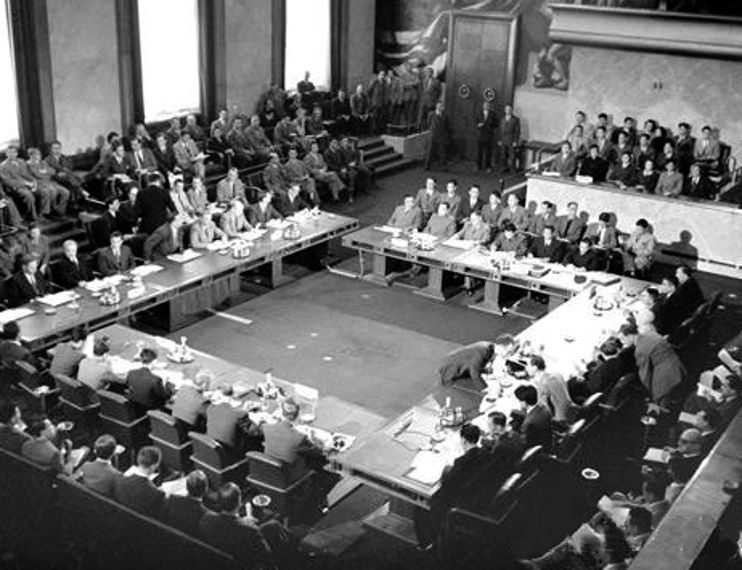
The 1954 Geneva Conference

The partition of French Indochina that resulted from the Conference, including the Kingdom of Cambodia, the Kingdom of Laos, the Democratic Republic of Vietnam, and the State of Vietnam.

On 21 July 1954, the Geneva Accords were signed. They established the terms of a ceasefire, the division of Vietnam at the 17th parallel north, the regrouping of Pathet Lao forces in two provinces of Laos, and the disarmament of the United Issarak Front (UIF) in Cambodia. France also undertook under these agreements to respect the independence of the three Indochinese states and to withdraw its troops at their request. Việt Minh troops had several months to evacuate Laos and Cambodia. A free election was to be held in Vietnam in 1956 under international supervision, with a view to reunification.

==== Partition of Vietnam ====
The Geneva Conference recognized the 17th parallel north as a "provisional military demarcation line", temporarily dividing the country into two zones. Operation Passage to Freedom began in August, consisting of the evacuation of Vietnamese civilians from communist North Vietnam to pro-Western South Vietnam.

The Geneva Accords promised elections in 1956 to determine a national government for a united Vietnam. Neither the United States government nor the State of Vietnam signed the 1954 Geneva Accords. With respect to the question of reunification, the non-communist Vietnamese delegation objected strenuously to any division of Vietnam, but lost out when the French accepted the proposal of Viet Minh delegate Phạm Văn Đồng, who proposed that Vietnam eventually be united by elections under the supervision of "local commissions". The United States countered with what became known as the "American Plan", with the support of South Vietnam and the United Kingdom. The American Plan provided for unification elections under the supervision of the United Nations, but was rejected by the Soviet delegation. From his home in France, Bảo Đại appointed Ngo Dinh Diem as Prime Minister of the State of Vietnam. With American support, in 1955, Diem staged a referendum to remove the former Emperor and declare himself the president, reconstituting the regime into the Republic of Vietnam (would be known as the South Vietnam).

When the elections failed to occur, Viet Minh forces that had remained in South Vietnam were activated and began to fight the US-backed Republic of Vietnam government, with the emergence of the so-called Viet Cong, which nominally established the National Liberation Front (1960), the Liberation Army (1961), and the Provisional Revolutionary Government (1969). In the North, the DRV Government enjoyed a brief period of stabilization, with Viet Minh itself transformed into the existing Vietnam Fatherland Front in 1955 under the leadership of the reorganized Workers' Party of Vietnam (now CPV). The DRV also invaded and occupied portions of Laos to assist in supplying the Viet Cong guerrillas fighting in South Vietnam. This war gradually escalated into the Second Indochina War, more commonly known as the Vietnam War.

==== Laos and Cambodia ====
Separate accords were signed by the signatories with the Kingdom of Laos and the Kingdom of Cambodia in relation to Laos and Cambodia respectively. Following the terms of the agreement, Laos would be governed by the Royal Lao Government, while Cambodia would be ruled by the royal court of Norodom Sihanouk.

Despite retaining its monarchy, the agreement also allowed for "VWP-affiliated Laotian forces" to run the provinces of Xam Neua and Phongsaly, further expanding North Vietnamese influence within Indochina. The Viet Minh and North Vietnamese never really withdrew from the border areas of Laos and the Pathet Lao continued to operate almost as a branch organization of the Viet Minh. Two months after the conference, the North Vietnamese formed Group 100 with headquarters at Na Mèo.

Due to the agreement, communist forces in Cambodia would remain out of power. With this backdrop around a thousand of UIF cadres left for Vietnam along with the departing Viet Minh forces, on Polish ships provided by the ICSC on the Mekong river.

=== Effect on French colonies ===
The Viet Minh victory in the war had an inspirational effect to independence movements in various French colonies worldwide, most notably the FLN in Algeria. The Algerian War broke out on 1 November 1954, only six months after the Geneva Conference. Benyoucef Benkhedda, later became the head of the Provisional Government of the Algerian Republic, praised the Viet Minh feat at Dien Bien Phu as "a powerful incentive to all who thought immediate insurrection the only possible strategy". The French Communist Party played an even stronger role by supplying the National Liberation Front (FLN) rebels with intelligence documents and financial aid. They were called "the suitcase carriers" (les porteurs de valises).

In the French news, the Indochina War was presented as a direct continuation of the Korean War, where France had fought: a UN French battalion, incorporated in a U.S. unit in Korea, was later involved in the Battle of Mang Yang Pass of June and July 1954. In an interview taped in May 2004, General Marcel Bigeard (6th BPC) argues that "one of the deepest mistakes done by the French during the war was the propaganda telling you are fighting for Freedom, you are fighting against Communism", hence the sacrifice of volunteers during the climactic battle of Dien Bien Phu. In the latest days of the siege, 652 non-paratrooper soldiers from all army corps from cavalry to infantry to artillery dropped for the first and last time of their life to support their comrades. The Cold War excuse was later used by General Maurice Challe through his famous "Do you want Mers El Kébir and Algiers to become Soviet bases as soon as tomorrow?", during the Generals' putsch (Algerian War) of 1961, with limited effect though.

== Atrocities ==
Atrocities occurred in the conflict long before France ratified the 1949 Geneva Conventions on June 28, 1951, in which such acts committed afterwards in violation of the Conventions' provisions in force became war crimes. Common Article 3 of the 1949 Geneva Conventions contains a minimum protection that only applies to humane treatment in a non-international conflict (i.e., war by a state against non-state armed groups or between non-state armed groups themselves). For the purpose of this section, however, atrocities committed before or after France's ratification of the 1949 Geneva Conventions are included.

=== French ===
During the war, there were many instances of war rapes against Vietnamese civilians by French soldiers. This occurred in Saigon, alongside robberies and killings, following the return of the French in August 1945. Vietnamese women were also raped by French soldiers in northern Vietnam in 1948, following the defeat of the Viet Minh, including in Bảo Hà, Bảo Yên District, Lào Cai province and Phu Lu. This led to 400 French-trained Vietnamese defecting to the Viet Minh in June 1948. French killings of Vietnamese civilians were reported, many of them were caused by the tendency of Viet Minh troops to hide among civilian settlements. One of the largest massacres by French troops was the Mỹ Trạch massacre of November 29, 1947, in which French soldiers killed over 200 women and children. Regarding this massacre and other atrocities during the conflict, Christopher Goscha wrote in The Penguin History of Modern Vietnam:

Rape became a disturbing weapon used by the Expeditionary Corps, as did summary executions. Young Vietnamese women who could not escape approaching enemy patrols smeared themselves with any stinking thing they could find, including human excrement. Decapitated [sic] heads were raised on sticks, bodies were gruesomely disemboweled, and body parts were taken as 'souvenirs'; Vietnamese soldiers of all political color also committed such acts. The non-communist nationalist singer, Phạm Duy, wrote a bone-chilling ballad about the mothers of Gio Linh village in central Vietnam, each of whom had lost a son to a French Army massacre in 1948. Troops decapitated their bodies and displayed their heads along a public road to strike fear into those tempted to accept the Democratic Republic of Vietnam's sovereignty. Massacres did not start with the Americans in My Lai, or the Vietnamese communists in Hue in 1968. And yet, the French Union's massacre of over two hundred Vietnamese women and children in My Tratch in 1948 remains virtually unknown in France to this day.

The French Army also utilized torture against Việt Minh prisoners. Benjamin Valentino estimates that the French were responsible for 60,000 to 250,000 civilian deaths.

=== Viet Minh ===
According to Arthur J. Dommen, the Việt Minh assassinated 100,000–150,000 civilians during the war out of a total civilian death toll of 400,000.

Viet Minh militants employed terrorist attacks throughout the conflict as a systematic practice, often targeting European and Eurasian civilians. One of the worst attacks on Europeans was on 21 July 1952, when Viet Minh militants, using grenades, Sten guns, and machetes, massacred twenty unarmed people at a military hospital in Cap St. Jacques—eight officers on sick leave, six children, four Vietnamese servants, and two women.

Many French Union and Vietnamese National Army prisoners died in the Việt Minh POW camps as a result of torture. In the Boudarel Affair, French Communist militant Georges Boudarel was discovered to have used brainwashing and torture against French Union POWs in Việt Minh reeducation camps. The French national association of POWs brought Boudarel to court for a war crime charge.

== French domestic situation ==
The 1946 Constitution creating the Fourth Republic (1946–1958) made France a parliamentary republic. Because of the political context, it could find stability only by an alliance between the three dominant parties: the Christian Democratic Popular Republican Movement (MRP), the French Communist Party (PCF) and the socialist French Section of the Workers' International (SFIO). Known as tripartisme, this alliance briefly lasted until the May 1947 crisis, with the expulsion from Paul Ramadier's SFIO government of the PCF ministers, marking the official start of the Cold War in France. This had the effect of weakening the regime, with the two most significant movements of this period, Communism and Gaullism, in opposition.

A strong anti-war movement came into existence in France driven mostly by the powerful French Communist Party (outpowering the socialists) and its young militant associations, major trade unions such as the General Confederation of Labour, and notable leftist intellectuals. The first occurrence was probably at the National Assembly on March 21, 1947, when the communist deputies refused to back the military credits for Indochina. The following year a pacifist event was organized, the "1st Worldwide Congress of Peace Partisans" (1er Congrès Mondial des Partisans de la Paix, the World Peace Council's predecessor), which took place March 25–28, 1948, in Paris, with the French communist Nobel laureate atomic physicist Frédéric Joliot-Curie as president. Later, on April 28, 1950, Joliot-Curie would be dismissed from the military and civilian Atomic Energy Commission for political reasons.

Young communist militants (UJRF) were also accused of sabotage actions like the famous Henri Martin affair and the case of Raymonde Dien, who was jailed one year for having blocked an ammunition train, with the help of other militants, in order to prevent the supply of French forces in Indochina in February 1950. The dockworkers across France also struck, in numbers of more than 35,000, in protest of the war.

Similar actions against trains occurred in Roanne, Charleville, Marseille, and Paris. Even ammunition sabotage by PCF agents has been reported, such as grenades exploding in the hands of legionaries. These actions became such a cause for concern by 1950 that the French Assembly voted a law against sabotage between March 2–8. At this session tension was so high between politicians that fighting ensued in the assembly following communist deputies' speeches against the Indochinese policy. This month saw the French navy mariner and communist militant Henri Martin arrested by military police and jailed for five years for sabotage and propaganda operations in Toulon's arsenal. On May 5 communist Ministers were dismissed from the government, marking the end of Tripartism. A few months later on November 11, 1950, the French Communist Party leader Maurice Thorez went to Moscow.

Some military officers involved in the Revers Report scandal (Rapport Revers) such as Salan were pessimistic about the way the war was being conducted, with multiple political-military scandals all happening during the war, starting with the Generals' Affair (Affaire des Généraux) from September 1949 to November 1950. As a result, General Georges Revers was dismissed in December 1949 and socialist Defense Ministry Jules Moch (SFIO) was brought on court by the National Assembly on November 28, 1950. The scandal started the commercial success of the first French news magazine, L'Express, created in 1953. The third scandal was financial-political, concerning military corruption, money and arms trading involving both the French Union army and the Việt Minh, known as the Piastres affair.

By 1954, despite official propaganda presenting the war as a "crusade against communism", the war in Indochina was still growing unpopular with the French public. The political stagnation in the Fourth Republic meant that France was unable to extract itself from the conflict.

Unlikely alliances had to be made between left- and right-wing parties in order to form a government invested by the National Assembly, resulting in parliamentary instability, with 14 prime ministers in succession between 1947 and 1954. The rapid turnover of governments (there were 17 different governments during the war) left France unable to prosecute the war with any consistent policy, according to veteran General René de Biré (who was a lieutenant at Dien Bien Phu). France was increasingly unable to afford the costly conflict in Indochina and, by 1954, the United States was paying 80% of France's war effort, which was $3,000,000 per day in 1952.

== French Union involvement ==
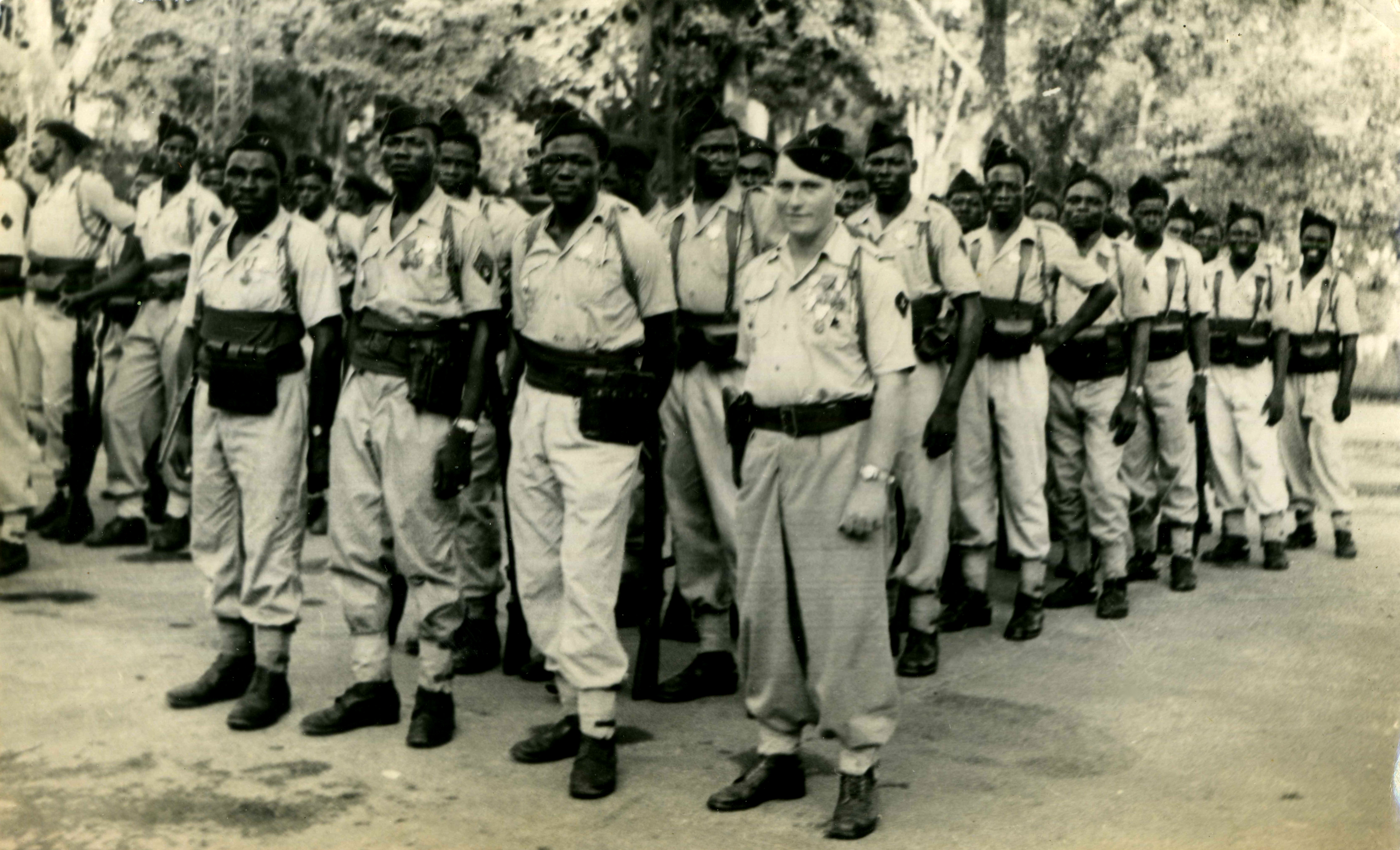
Senegalese Tirailleurs in Hanoi, 14 July 1950

By 1946, France headed the French Union. As successive governments had forbidden the sending of metropolitan troops, the French Far East Expeditionary Corps (CEFEO) was created in March 1945. The Union gathered combatants from almost all French territories made of colonies, protectorates and associated states (Algeria, Morocco, Madagascar, Senegal, Tunisia, etc.) to fight in French Indochina, which was then occupied by the Japanese. About 325,000 of the 500,000 French troops were Indochinese, almost all of whom were used in conventional units. French West Africa (Afrique Occidentale Française, AOF) was a federation of African colonies. Senegalese and other African troops were sent to fight in Indochina. Some African alumni were trained in the Infantry Instruction Center no.2 (Centre d'Instruction de l'Infanterie no.2) located in southern Vietnam. Senegalese of the Colonial Artillery fought at the siege of Dien Bien Phu. As a French colony (later a full province), French Algeria sent local troops to Indochina including several RTA (Régiment de Tirailleurs Algériens) light infantry battalions. Morocco was a French protectorate and sent troops to support the French effort in Indochina. Moroccan troops were part of light infantry RTMs (Régiment de Tirailleurs Marocains) for the "Moroccan Sharpshooters Regiment".

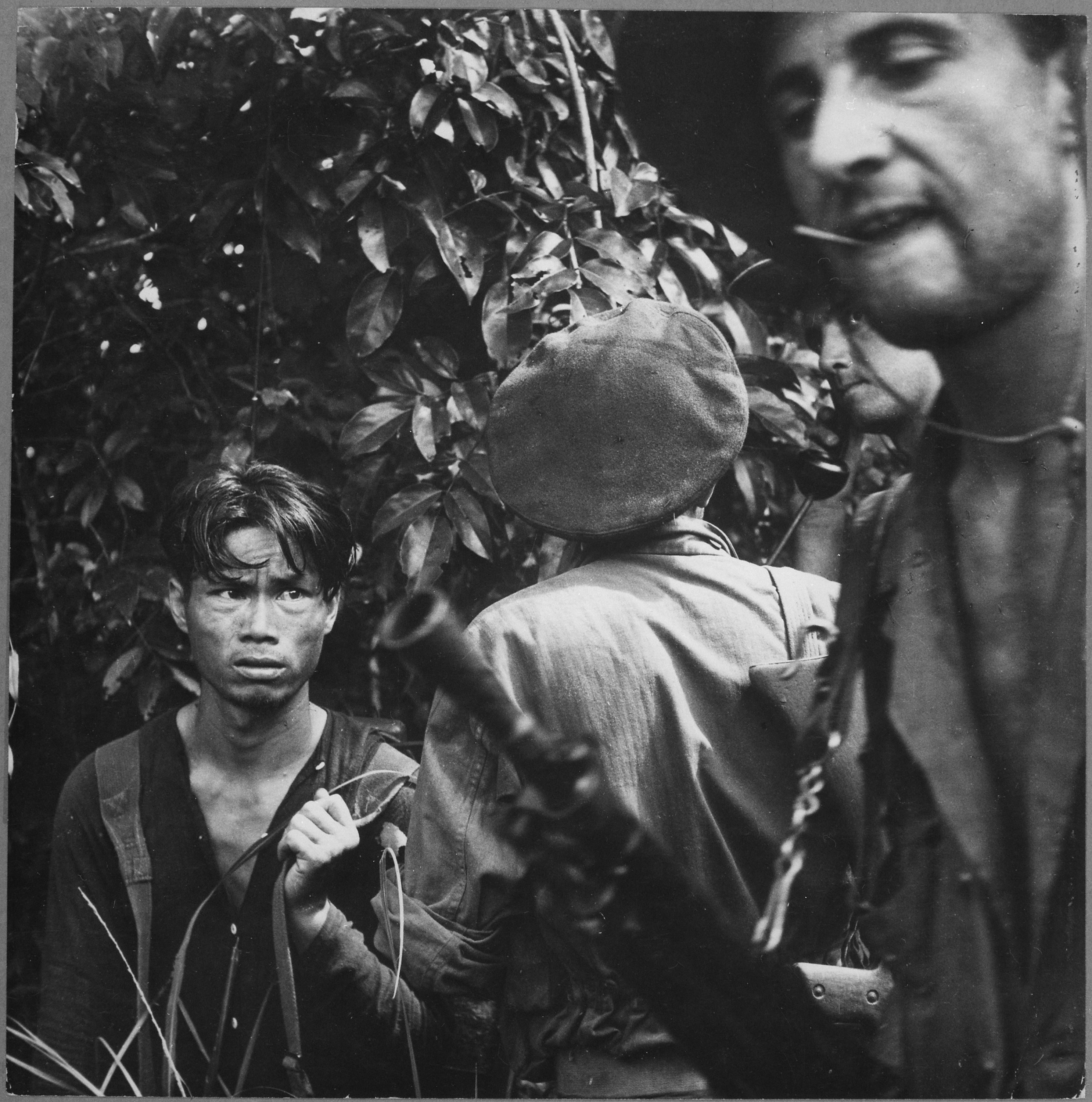
French Foreign Legion patrol question a suspected member of the Việt Minh.

As a French protectorate, Bizerte, Tunisia, was a major French base. Tunisian troops, mostly RTT (Régiment de Tirailleurs Tunisiens), were sent to Indochina. Part of French Indochina, then part of the French Union and later an associated state, Laos fought the communists along with French forces. The role played by Laotian troops in the conflict was depicted by veteran Pierre Schoendoerffer's famous 317th Platoon released in 1964. The French Indochina state of Cambodia also played a role during the Indochina War through the Khmer Royal Army, which had been formed in 1946 in an agreement signed with the French.

While Bảo Đại's State of Vietnam (formerly Annam, Tonkin, Cochinchina) had the Vietnamese National Army supporting the French forces, some minorities were trained and organized as regular battalions (mostly infantry tirailleurs) that fought with French forces against the Việt Minh. The Tai Battalion 2 (BT2, 2e Bataillon Thai) is infamous for its desertion during the siege of Dien Bien Phu. Propaganda leaflets written in Tai and French sent by the Việt Minh were found in the deserted positions and trenches. Such deserters were called the Nam Yum rats by Bigeard during the siege, as they hid close to the Nam Yum river during the day and searched at night for supply drops. Another allied minority was the Muong people (Mường). The 1st Muong Battalion (1er Bataillon Muong) was awarded the Croix de guerre des théâtres d'opérations extérieures after the victorious Battle of Vĩnh Yên in 1951.

In the 1950s, the French established secret commando groups based on loyal Montagnard ethnic minorities referred to as "partisans" or "maquisards", called the Groupement de Commandos Mixtes Aéroportés (Composite Airborne Commando Group or GCMA), later renamed Groupement Mixte d'Intervention (GMI, or Mixed Intervention Group), directed by the SDECE counter-intelligence service. The SDECE's "Service Action" GCMA used both commando and guerrilla techniques and operated in intelligence and secret missions from 1950 to 1955. Declassified information about the GCMA includes the name of its commander, famous Colonel Roger Trinquier, and a mission on April 30, 1954, when Jedburgh veteran Captain Sassi led the Meo partisans of the GCMA Malo-Servan in Operation Condor during the siege of Dien Bien Phu.

In 1951, Adjutant-Chief Vandenberghe from the 6th Colonial Infantry Regiment (6e RIC) created the "Commando Vanden" (aka "Black Tigers", aka "North Vietnam Commando #24") based in Nam Định. Recruits were volunteers from the Thổ people, Nùng people and Miao people. This commando unit wore Việt Minh black uniforms to confuse the enemy and used techniques of the experienced Bo doi (Bộ đội, regular army) and Du Kich (guerrilla unit). Việt Minh prisoners were recruited in POW camps. The commando was awarded the Croix de Guerre des TOE with palm in July 1951; however, Vandenberghe was betrayed by a Việt Minh recruit, commander Nguien Tinh Khoi (308th Division's 56th Regiment), who assassinated him (and his Vietnamese fiancée) with external help on the night of January 5, 1952. Coolies and POWs known as PIM (Prisonniers Internés Militaires, which is basically the same as POW) were civilians used by the army as logistical support personnel. During the battle of Dien Bien Phu, coolies were in charge of burying the corpses—during the first days only, after they were abandoned, hence giving off a terrible smell, according to veterans—and they had the dangerous job of gathering supply packets delivered in drop zones while the Việt Minh artillery was firing hard to destroy the crates. The Việt Minh also used thousands of coolies to carry the Chu-Luc (regional units) supplies and ammunition during assaults. The PIM were civilian males old enough to join Bảo Đại's army. They were captured in enemy-controlled villages, and those who refused to join the State of Vietnam's army were considered prisoners or used as coolies to support a given regiment.

== Foreign involvement ==
=== Japanese volunteers ===
Many former Imperial Japanese Army soldiers fought alongside the Việt Minh—perhaps as many as 5,000 volunteered their services throughout the war. These Japanese soldiers had stayed behind in Indochina after World War II concluded in 1945. The occupying British authorities then repatriated most of the rest of the 50,000 Japanese troops back to Japan. For those that stayed behind, supporting the Việt Minh became a more attractive idea than returning to a defeated and occupied homeland. In addition the Việt Minh had minimal experience in warfare or government so the advice of the Japanese was welcome. Some of the Japanese were ex-Kenpeitai who were wanted for questioning by Allied authorities. Giap arranged for them all to receive Vietnamese citizenship and false identification papers. Some Japanese were captured by the Việt Minh during the last months of World War II and were recruited into their ranks.

Most of the Japanese officers who stayed served as military instructors for the Việt Minh forces, most notably at the Quảng Ngãi Army Academy. They imparted necessary conventional military knowledge – such as how to conduct assaults, night attacks, company/battalion level exercises, commanding, tactics, navigation, communications and movements. A few, however, actively led Vietnamese forces into combat. The French also identified eleven Japanese nurses and two doctors working for the Việt Minh in northern Vietnam in 1951. The Yasukuni Shrine commemorates a number of Japanese involved in the First Indochina War.

Notable Japanese officers serving in Việt Minh included:

- Colonel Mukaiyama – reportedly a staff officer in the 38th Army, who became a technical advisor to the Vietnamese. Credited as the leader of Japanese forces in Vietnam; killed in combat in 1946.
- Colonel Masanobu Tsuji – Operations Staff Officer.
- Major Ishii Takuo – a staff officer in the 55th Division who had commanded a squadron of its cavalry regiment. Supposedly the youngest major in the Imperial Army at the time, he led a number of volunteers to the Vietnamese cause, becoming a colonel and military advisor to General Nguyễn Sơn. He headed the Quảng Ngãi Military Academy for a while before founding the Tuy Hòa Military Academy, and was killed by a land mine in 1950.
- Major Kanetoshi Toshihide – served with Major Igari in the 2nd Division and followed him to join the Việt Minh; he became Chief of Staff for General Nguyễn Giác Ngộ.
- Major Igawa Sei – a staff officer in the 34th Independent Mixed Brigade; he joined the Viet Minh forces, and was killed in action against the French in 1946. He allegedly conceived the idea of establishing the Quảng Ngãi Military Academy.
- Lieutenant Igari Kazumasa – the commander of an infantry company in the 2nd Division's 29th Infantry Regiment; he became an instructor at the Quảng Ngãi Military Academy.
- Lieutenant Kamo Tokuji – a platoon leader under Lieutenant Igari; he also became an instructor at the Quảng Ngãi Military Academy.
- 2nd Lieutenant Tanimoto Kikuo an intelligence officer who was originally supposed to remain behind in Indonesia, but linked up with the 34th Brigade to try to get home, only to end up as an instructor at the Quảng Ngãi Military Academy until 1954.
- 2nd Lieutenant Nakahara Mitsunobu – an intelligence officer of the 34th Independent Mixed Brigade; became a decorated soldier in the Việt Minh forces, and later an instructor at the Quảng Ngãi Military Academy.

=== China ===
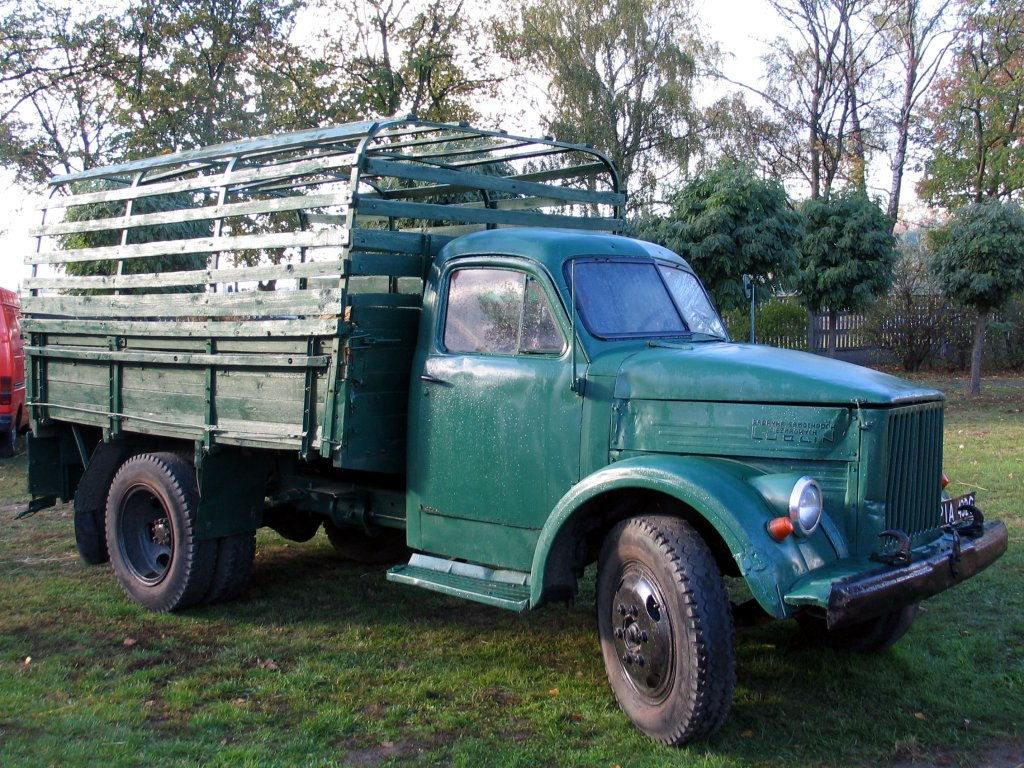
China supplied the Việt Minh with hundreds of Soviet-built GAZ-51 trucks during the 1950s.

The victory of the Chinese communists in December 1949 proved decisive in the course of the war as during the early 1950s guerrilla troops used the southern areas of China as a sanctuary where new troops could be trained and fitted beyond the reach of the French. The Việt Minh successfully carried out several hit-and-run ambushes against French Union military convoys along the Route Coloniale 4 (RC 4) roadway, which ran along the Chinese border, and was a major supply passage in Tonkin (northern Vietnam) for a series of frontier forts. One of the most famous attacks of this nature was the Battle of Cao Bằng of 1947–1949.

China supplied and provided the Việt Minh guerrilla forces with almost every kind of crucial and important supplies and material required, such as food (including thousands of tonnes of rice), money, medics and medical aid and supplies, arms and weapons (ranging from artillery guns (24 of which were used at the Battle of Dien Bien Phu) to rifles and machine-guns), ammunition and explosives and other types of military equipment, including a large part of war-material captured from the then-recently defeated National Revolutionary Army (NRA) of Chiang Kai-shek's Nationalist Chinese government following the end of the Chinese Civil War in 1949. Evidence of the People's Republic of China's secret aid and supplies were found hidden in caves during the French military's Operation Hirondelle in July 1953. 2,000 military advisors from the PRC and the Soviet Union trained the Việt Minh guerrilla force with the aim of turning it into a full-fledged armed force to fight off their French colonial masters and gain national independence. On top of this, the PRC sent two People's Liberation Army (PLA) artillery battalions to fight at the siege of Dien Bien Phu on May 6, 1954, with one battalion operating the Soviet Katyusha multiple-rocket launcher systems (MRLS) against French forces besieged at Dien Bien Phu's valley.

From 1950 to 1954 the Chinese government shipped goods, materials, and medicine worth $54 billion (in 2025 dollars) to Vietnam. From 1950 to 1956 the Chinese government shipped 155,000 small arms, 58 million rounds of ammunition, 4,630 artillery pieces, 1,080,000 artillery shells, 840,000 hand grenades, 1,400,000 uniforms, 1,200 vehicles, 14,000 tons of food, and 26,000 tons of fuel to Vietnam. Mao Zedong considered it necessary to buttress the Viet Minh to secure his country's southern flank against potential interference by westerners, while the bulk of the PRC's regular military forces participated in the Korean War from 1950 to 1953. After the end of the Korean War and the resolution of the First Taiwan Strait Crisis, China stepped up involvement in the Indochina Wars, viewing the presence of potentially hostile forces in Indochina as the main threat.

=== Soviet Union ===
The Soviet Union was the other major ally of the Việt Minh, alongside the PRC. Moscow supplied GAZ-built trucks, truck engines and motor-parts, fuel, tyres, many different kinds of arms and weapons (including thousands of Škoda-manufactured light machine-guns of Czech origin), all kinds of ammunition (ranging from rifle to machine-gun ammunition), various types of anti-aircraft guns (such as the 37mm air-defense gun) and even cigarettes and tobacco products. During Operation Hirondelle, French Union paratroopers captured and destroyed many tonnes of Soviet-supplied material destined for Việt Minh use in the area of Ky Lua. According to General Giap, the chief military leader of all Việt Minh forces, the Việt Minh used about 400 Soviet-produced GAZ-51 trucks at the Battle of Dien Bien Phu. Because the trucks were concealed and hidden with the use of highly effective camouflage (consisting predominantly of thick vegetation), French Union reconnaissance aircraft were not able to notice them and take note of the effective Việt Minh supply-train. On May 6, 1954, during the siege against French forces at the valley of Dien Bien Phu, Soviet-supplied Katyusha MLRS were successfully fielded against French Union military outposts, destroying enemy troop formations and bases and lowering their morale levels. Together with the PRC, the Soviet Union sent up to 2,000 military advisors to provide training to the Việt Minh guerrilla troops and to turn it into a conventional army.

=== United States ===
==== Mutual Defense Assistance Act (1950–1954) ====
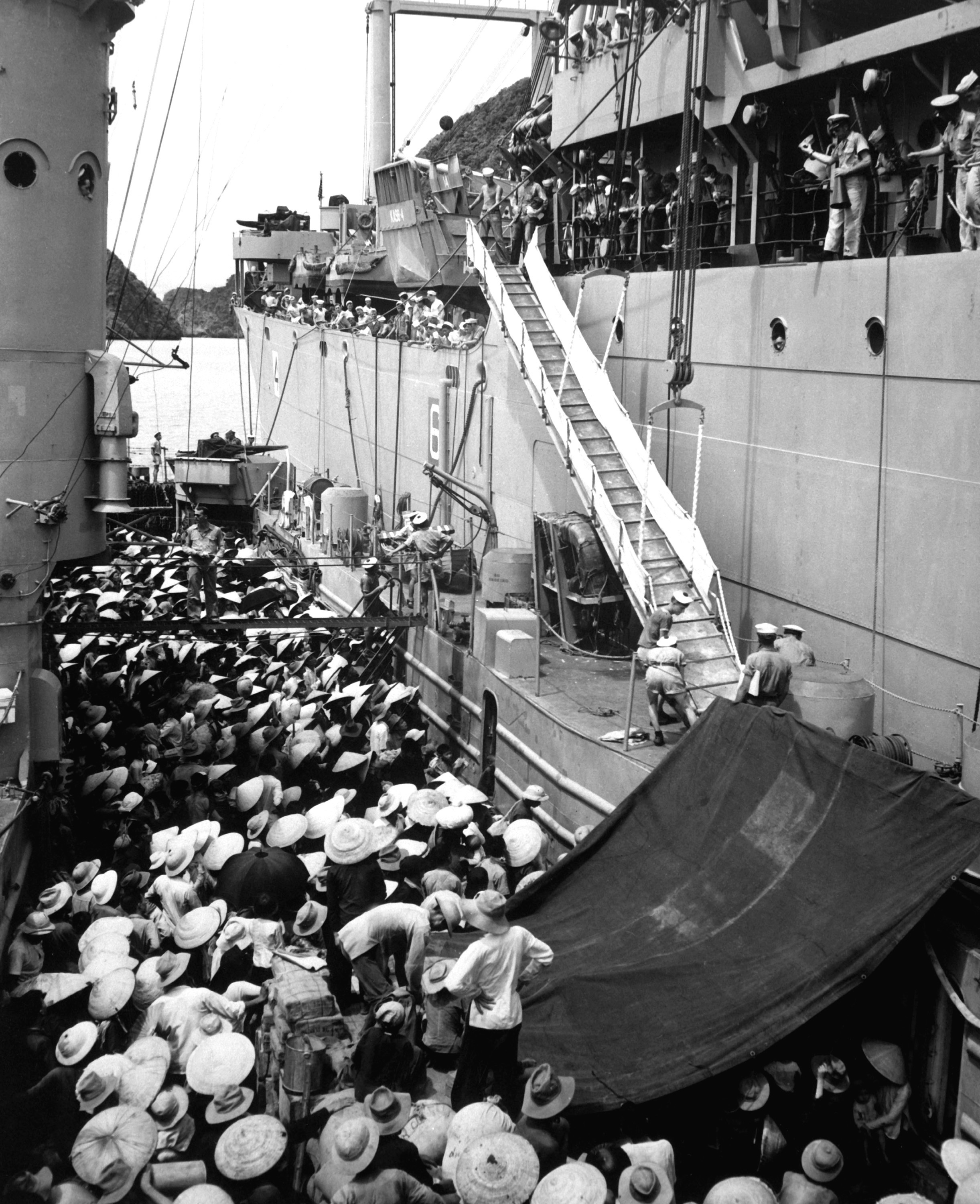
Anti-communist Vietnamese refugees moving from a French LSM landing ship to the USS Montague during Operation Passage to Freedom in 1954

At the beginning of the war, the U.S. was neutral in the conflict because of its opposition to European colonialism, because the Việt Minh had recently been U.S. allies, and because, in the context of the Cold War, most of its attention was focused on Europe where Winston Churchill argued an "Iron Curtain" had fallen.

The 1949 victory of Mao Zedong's Chinese Communist Party in the Chinese Civil War, the recognition of the DRV by the USSR and the newly formed People's Republic of China in January 1950, which prompted the US and the UK to recognize the State of Vietnam in response, and the signing of the Sino-Soviet Treaty of Friendship shortly after in February, shifted the US stance on the matter, and the war came to be viewed as another front in the anticommunist struggle.

Indochina, and Southeast Asia more broadly, was declared vital by the U.S. government, and the containment of communism at the southern Chinese border, and, later, Korea, became one of the priorities of American foreign policy as it was believed that the fall of Indochina to communist hands would lead to the loss of other nations in the region. At this time, communism was seen as a uniform bloc, dominated by the Soviet Union. It was feared in Washington that if Ho were to win the war, he would establish a state politically aligned with Moscow, with the Soviets ultimately controlling Vietnamese affairs. This prospect spurred the U.S. to support France in their war effort, primarily through the Mutual Defense Assistance Act. In May 1950, after Chinese communist forces occupied Hainan island, U.S. President Harry S. Truman began covertly authorizing direct financial assistance to the French, and on June 27, 1950, after the outbreak of the Korean War, announced publicly that the U.S. was doing so.

On June 30, 1950, the first U.S. supplies for Indochina were delivered. In September, Truman sent the Military Assistance Advisory Group (MAAG) to Indochina to assist the French. Later, in 1954, U.S. President Dwight D. Eisenhower explained the escalation risk, introducing what he referred to as the "domino principle", which eventually became the concept of domino theory. After the Moch–Marshall meeting of September 23, 1950, in Washington, United States, started to support the French Union effort politically, logistically and financially. Officially, US involvement did not include use of armed force.

As the situation at Dien Bien Phu deteriorated in 1954, France requested more support from the United States, including equipment and direct intervention. For instance, on April 4 French Prime Minister Joseph Laniel and Foreign Minister Georges Bidault conveyed to U.S. Ambassador C. Douglas Dillon that "immediate armed intervention of US carrier aircraft at DienBien Phu is now necessary to save the situation". The United States discussed with allies multiple options, including the use of nuclear weapons. A key concern in the planning was the response of China. While the planning continued, the United States moved an aircraft-carrier task-force, which included the carriers Boxer and Essex, into the South China Sea between the Philippines and Indochina. However, the leadership of the United States eventually decided that there was not sufficient international or domestic support for the United States to become directly involved in the conflict.

Following the end of the war United States Secretary of State John Foster Dulles denounced Chinese aid to the Việt Minh, and explained that the United States could not act openly because of international pressure, and concluded with the call to "all concerned nations" concerning the necessity of "a collective defense" against "the communist aggression".

==== US Navy assistance (1951–1954) ====
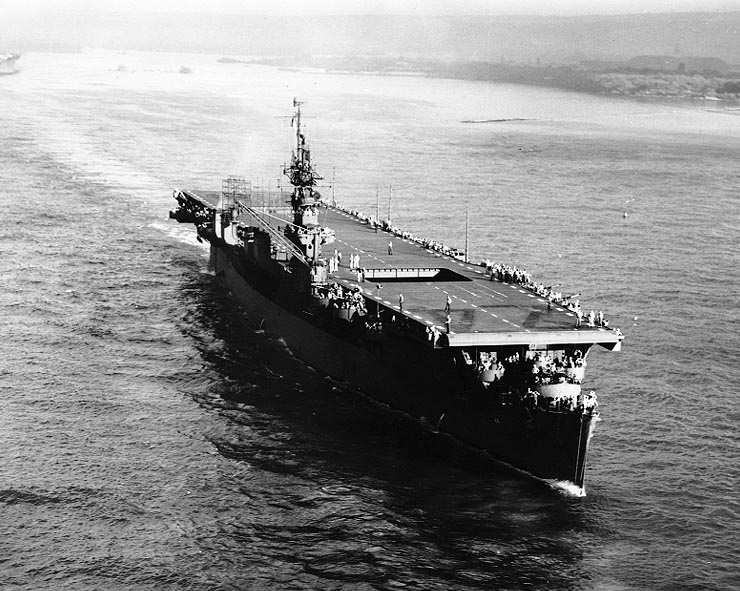
Bois Belleau (aka USS Belleau Wood) transferred to France in 1953

USS Windham Bay delivered Grumman F8F Bearcat fighter aircraft to Saigon on January 26, 1951.

On March 2, 1951, the United States Navy transferred USS Agenor (LST 490) to the French Navy in Indochina in accordance with the MAAG-led MAP. Renamed RFS Vulcain (A-656), she was used in Operation Hirondelle in 1953. USS Sitkoh Bay carrier delivered Grumman F8F Bearcat aircraft to Saigon on March 26, 1951. During September 1953, USS Belleau Wood (renamed Bois Belleau) was lent to France and sent to French Indochina to replace the Arromanches. She was used to support delta defenders in the Hạ Long Bay operation in May 1954. In August she joined the Franco-American evacuation operation called "Passage to Freedom". The same month, the United States delivered additional aircraft, again using USS Windham Bay. On April 18, 1954, during the siege of Dien Bien Phu, USS Saipan delivered 25 Korean War AU-1 Corsair aircraft for use by the French Aeronavale in supporting the besieged garrison.

==== US Air Force assistance (1952–1954) ====
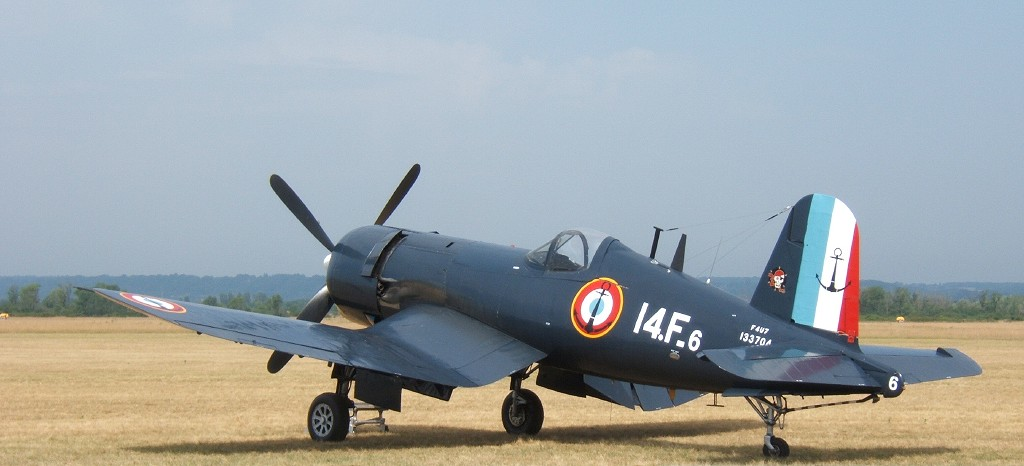
A 1952 F4U-7 Corsair of the 14.F flotilla which fought at Dien Bien Phu

A total of 94 F4U-7s were built for the Aéronavale in 1952, with the last of the batch, the final Corsair built, rolled out in December 1952. The F4U-7s were actually purchased by the U.S. Navy and passed on to the Aéronavale through the U.S. Military Assistance Program (MAP). They were supplemented by 25 ex-U.S.MC AU-1s (previously used in the Korean War) and moved from Yokosuka, Japan, to Tourane Air Base (Da Nang), Vietnam, in April 1952. US Air Force assistance followed in November 1953 when the French commander in Indochina, General Henri Navarre, asked General Chester E. McCarty, commander of the Combat Cargo Division, for 12 Fairchild C-119s for Operation Castor at Dien Bien Phu. The USAF also provided C-124 Globemasters to transport French paratroop reinforcements to Indochina. Under the codename Project Swivel Chair, on March 3, 1954, 12 C-119s of the 483rd Troop Carrier Wing ("Packet Rats") based at Ashiya, Japan, were painted with France's insignia and loaned to France with 24 CIA pilots for short-term use. Maintenance was carried out by the US Air Force and airlift operations were commanded by McCarty.

==== Central Intelligence Agency covert operations (1953–1954) ====
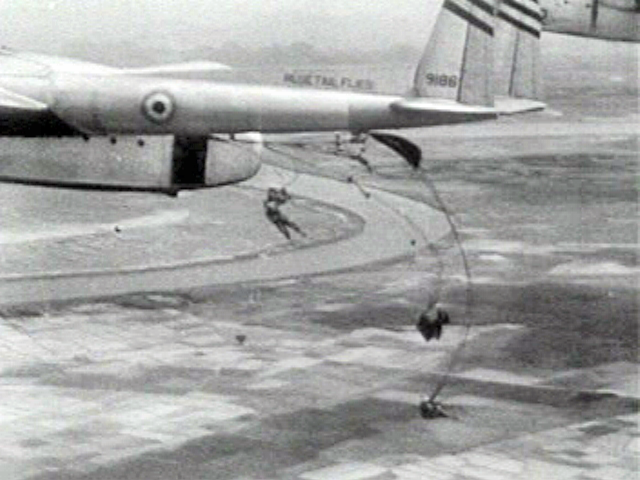
French-marked USAF C-119 flown by CIA pilots over Dien Bien Phu in 1954

At the request of the French, the US government tasked the CIA to carry out covert airlift operations to support the French troops in Laos. To that end, during Operation SQUAW, from 5 May to 16 July 1953, the CIA used 12 pilots, officially employed by the (CIA owned) Civil Air Transport airline, to fly equipment on 6 C-119s supplied by the USAF, bearing French colours. Twenty four Civil Air Transport pilots supplied the French Union garrison during the siege of Dien Bien Phu – airlifting paratroopers, ammunition, artillery pieces, tons of barbed wire, medics and other military materiel. With the reducing Drop zone areas, night operations and anti-aircraft artillery assaults, many of the "packets" fell into Việt Minh hands. The CIA pilots completed 682 airdrops under anti-aircraft fire between March 13 and May 6, 1954. Two CAT pilots, Wallace Bufford and James B. McGovern Jr. were killed in action when their Fairchild C-119 Flying Boxcar was shot down on May 6, 1954. On February 25, 2005, the French ambassador to the United States, Jean-David Levitte, awarded the seven remaining CIA pilots the Légion d'honneur.

==== Operation Passage to Freedom (1954) ====
In August 1954, in support of the French navy and the merchant navy, the U.S. Navy launched Operation Passage to Freedom and sent hundreds of ships, including USS Montague, in order to evacuate non-communist—especially Catholic—Vietnamese refugees from North Vietnam following the July 20, 1954, armistice and partition of Vietnam. Up to 1 million Vietnamese civilians were transported from North to South during this period, with around one-tenth of that number moving in the opposite direction.

== Popular culture ==
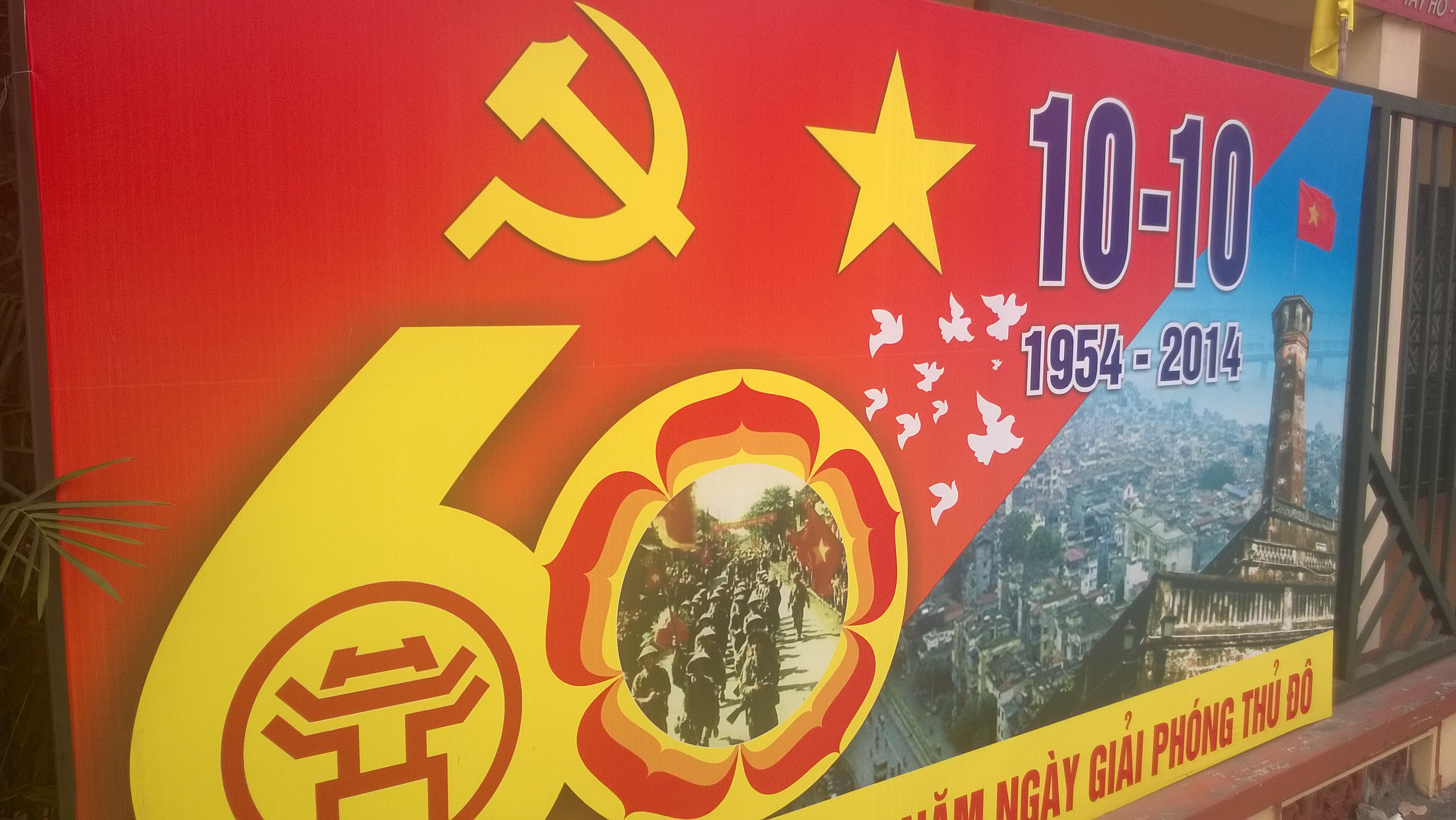
A poster celebrating the 60th anniversary of the Liberation of the Capital, Hanoi

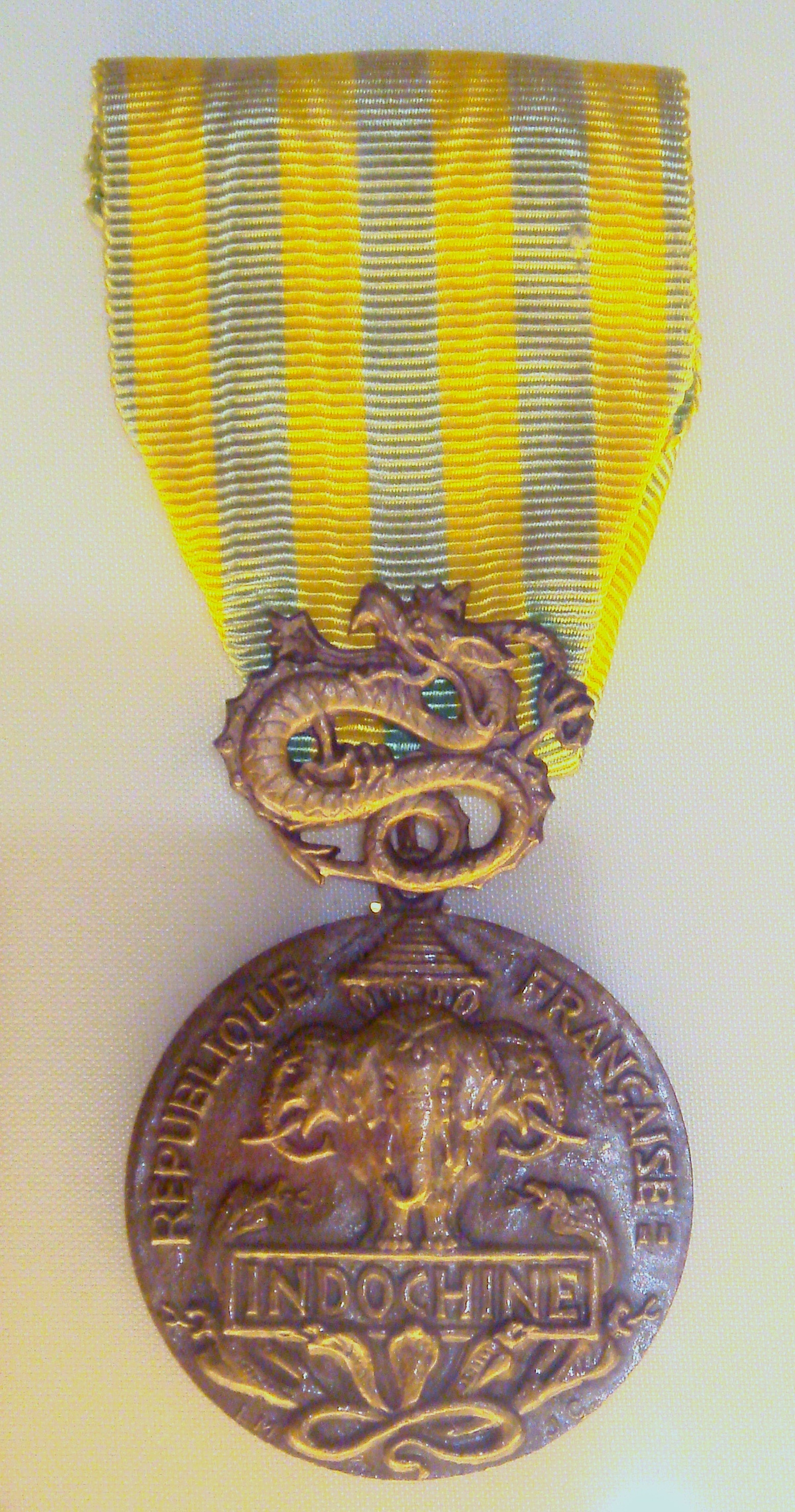
French Indochina medal, law of August 1, 1953

Although the war was largely treated with indifference in metropolitan France, "the dirty war" has been featured in various films, books and songs. Since its declassification in the 2000s, television documentaries have been released using new perspectives about the U.S. covert involvement and open critics about the French propaganda used during wartime.

The famous Communist propagandist Roman Karmen was in charge of the media exploitation of the battle of Dien Bien Phu. In his documentary, Vietnam (Вьетнам, 1955), he staged the famous scene with the raising of the Việt Minh flag over de Castries' bunker which is similar to the one he staged over the Berlin Reichstag roof during World War II (Берлин, 1945) and the S-shaped POW column marching after the battle, where he used the same optical technique he experimented with before when he staged the German prisoners after the Siege of Leningrad (Ленинград в борьбе, 1942) and the Battle of Moscow (Разгром немецких войск под Москвой, 1942).

Hollywood made a film about Dien Bien Phu in 1955, Jump into Hell, directed by David Butler and scripted by Irving Wallace, before his fame as a bestselling novelist. Hollywood also made several films about the war, Robert Florey's Rogues' Regiment (1948). Samuel Fuller's China Gate (1957). and James Clavell's Five Gates to Hell (1959).

The first French movie about the war, Shock Patrol (Patrouille de Choc) aka Patrol Without Hope (Patrouille Sans Espoir) by Claude Bernard-Aubert, came out in 1956. The French censor cut some violent scenes and made the director change the end of his movie which was seen as "too pessimistic". Léo Joannon's film Fort du Fou (Fort of the Mad) /Outpost in Indochina was released in 1963. Another film was The 317th Platoon (La 317ème Section) was released in 1964, it was directed by Indochina War (and siege of Dien Bien Phu) veteran Pierre Schoendoerffer. Schoendoerffer has since become a media specialist about the Indochina War and has focused his production on realistic war movies. He was cameraman for the army ("Cinematographic Service of the Armies", SCA) during his duty time; moreover, as he had covered the Vietnam War he released The Anderson Platoon, which won the Academy Award for Documentary Feature. Graham Greene's novel The Quiet American takes place during this war.

In 2011, Vietnamese software developer Emobi Games released a first-person-shooter called 7554. Named after the date 07-05-54 (7 May 1954) which marks the end of the decisive Battle of Dien Bien Phu, it commemorates the First Indochina War from the Vietnamese point of view.

The 2017 film by Olivier Lorelle, Ciel Rouge, starring Cyril Descours and Audrey Giacomini, is set during the early part of the First Indochina War.

== See also ==
- Mémorial des guerres en Indochine

== Sources ==
- Asselin, Pierre (2024). Vietnam's American War: A New History. Cambridge University Press. ISBN 9781009229302.
- Asselin, Pierre (2023). "The Indochinese Communist Party's Unfinished Revolution of 1945 and the Origins of Vietnam's 30-Year Civil War". Journal of Cold War Studies. 25 (1): 4–45. doi:10.1162/jcws_a_01120.
- Buttinger, Joseph (1972). A Dragon Defiant: A Short History of Vietnam. New York: Praeger. OCLC 583077932.
- Chaliand, Gérard (1982). Guerrilla Strategies: An Historical Anthology from the Long March to Afghanistan. University of California Press. ISBN 978-0-520-04443-2.
- Chandler, David Porter (1991). The Tragedy of Cambodian history: Politics, War, and Revolution since 1945. New Haven: Yale University Press.
- Clodfelter, M. (2008). Warfare and armed conflicts: a statistical encyclopedia of casualty and other figures, 1494-2007. Jefferson, NC: McFarland. ISBN 978-0-7864-3319-3.
- Jian, Chen (1993). "China and the First Indo-China War, 1950–54". The China Quarterly. 133 (March): 85–110. doi:10.1017/s0305741000018208. ISSN 0305-7410. S2CID 155029840.
- Cadeau, Ivan (2015). La guerre d'Indochine - De l'Indochine française aux adieux à Saigon 1940-1956 (in French). Tallandier. ISBN 979-10-210-1022-2 – via the Internet Archive.
- Cogan, Charles G. (2000). "L'attitude des États-Unis à l'égard de la guerre d'Indochine" [The attitude of the United States towards the war in Indochina]. In Vaïsse, Maurice (ed.). Armée française dans la guerre d'Indochine (1946–1954) [French Army in the Indochina War (1946–1954)] (in French). Bruxelles: Complexe. pp. 51–88. ISBN 978-2-87027-810-9.
- Conboy, Kenneth; Morrison, James (1995). Shadow War: The CIA's Secret War in Laos. Boulder, CO: Paladin. ISBN 978-1-58160-535-8.
- Davidson, Phillip B. (1988). Vietnam at War: The History, 1946-1975. Oxford University Press. ISBN 0-89141-306-5 – via Google Books.
- Devillers, Philippe (1952). Histoire du Viêt-Nam de 1940 à 1952 (in French). Seuil.
- ———; Lacouture, Jean (1969). End of a War: Indochina, 1954. New York: Praeger. OCLC 575650635.
- ———, ed. (1988). Paris–Saigon–Hanoi: Les archives de la guerre 1944–1947 [Paris–Saigon–Hanoi: The archives of the 1944–1947 war] (in French). Gallimard. ISBN 978-2-07-071216-8.
- Dunstan, Simon (2004). Vietnam Tracks: Armor in Battle 1945–75. Osprey. ISBN 978-1-84176-833-5.
- Chapman, Jessica M. (2010). "The Sect Crisis of 1955 and the American Commitment to Ngô Đình Diệm". Journal of Vietnamese Studies. 5 (1). University of California Press: 37–85. doi:10.1525/vs.2010.5.1.37.
- Fall, Bernard B. (1963). The Two Viet-Nams: A Political and Military Analysis. New York: Praeger. OCLC 582302330 – via the Internet Archive.
- ——— (1967). Hell in a Very Small Place: The Siege of Dien Bien Phu. Philadelphia: Lippincott. OCLC 551565485.
- ——— (1994). Street Without Joy: The French Debacle in Indochina. Stackpole. ISBN 978-0-8117-1700-7 – via Google Books.
- Giap, Vo Nguyen (1971). The Military Art of People's War. New York: Modern Reader. ISBN 978-0-85345-193-8.
- Goscha, Christopher E. (2022). The Road to Dien Bien Phu: A History of the First War for Vietnam. Princeton University Press. ISBN 978-0-691-22865-5.
- ——— (2016). Vietnam: A New History. Basic Books. ISBN 9780465094370.
- ——— (2011). Historical Dictionary of the Indochina War (1945–1954): An International and Interdisciplinary Approach. NIAS Press. ISBN 978-87-7694-063-8. Archived from the original on 2 December 2020. Online search tool at UQÀM website.
- ——— (2008). "Belated Asian Allies: The Technical and Military Contributions of Japanese Deserters, (1945–50)". In Young, Marilyn B.; Buzzanco, Robert (eds.). A Companion to the Vietnam War. John Wiley & Sons. ISBN 978-1-4051-7204-2.
- Hammer, Ellen Joy (1954). The Struggle for Indochina. Stanford University Press. OCLC 575892787.
- Humphries, James F. (1999). Through the Valley: Vietnam, 1967–1968. Lynne Rienner. ISBN 978-1-55587-821-4.
- Holcombe, Alec (2020). Mass Mobilization in the Democratic Republic of Vietnam, 1945–1960. University of Hawaiʻi Press. doi:10.2307/j.ctv105bb0z. ISBN 978-0-8248-8447-5. JSTOR j.ctv105bb0z. S2CID 241948426.
- Kiernan, Ben (2004). How Pol Pot Came to Power. New Haven, London: Yale University Press.
- Kort, Michael G. (2017). The Vietnam War Reexamined. Cambridge University Press. ISBN 9781107110199.
- Marr, David G. (2013). Lilienthal, Philip E. (ed.). Vietnam: State, War, and Revolution (1945–1946). From Indochina to Vietnam: Revolution and War in a Global Perspective. Vol. 6 (Illustrated ed.). University of California Press. ISBN 978-0-520-27415-0. ISSN 2691-0403 – via Google Books.
- Miller, Edward, ed. (2024). The Cambridge History of the Vietnam War, Volume I: Origins. Cambridge University Press. doi:10.1017/9781316225240. ISBN 9781316225240.
- Perkins, Mandaley (2006). Hanoi, Adieu: A Bittersweet Memoir of French Indochina. Sydney: Harper Perennial. ISBN 978-0-7322-8197-7.
- Reilly, Brett (2016). "The Sovereign States of Vietnam, 1945–1955". Journal of Vietnamese Studies. 11 (3–4): 103–139. doi:10.1525/jvs.2016.11.3-4.103.
- Roy, Jules (1963). The Battle of Dienbienphu. New York: Pyramid. OCLC 613204239.
- Shrader, Charles R. (2015). A War of Logistics Parachutes and Porters in Indochina, 1945–1954. University Press of Kentucky. ISBN 978-0-8131-6576-9 – via Google Books.
- Spector, Roland H. (1983). Advice and Support: The Early Years 1941-1960. Center of Military History. ISBN 978-0-16-001600-4 – via Google Books.
- Summers, Harry G. (1995). Historical Atlas of the Vietnam War. New York: Houghton Mifflin. ISBN 978-0-395-72223-7.
- Thi, Lâm Quang (2002). The Twenty-Five Year Century: A South Vietnamese General Remembers the Indochina War to the Fall of Saigon. University of North Texas. ISBN 978-1-57441-143-0.
- Thomas, Martin; Asselin, Pierre (2022). "French Decolonisation and Civil War: The Dynamics of Violence in the Early Phases of Anticolonial War in Vietnam and Algeria, 1940–1956". Journal of Modern European History. 20 (4): 513–535. doi:10.1177/16118944221130231.
- Tønnesson, Stein (2009). Vietnam 1946: How the War Began. University of California Press. ISBN 978-0-520-25602-6.
- Tran, Nu-Anh (2022). Disunion: Anticommunist Nationalism and the Making of the Republic of Vietnam. University of Hawaiʻi Press. ISBN 9780824887865.
- Tuchman, Barbara W. (1985). The march of folly: from Troy to Vietnam. Random House. ISBN 978-0-345-30823-8 – via Google Books.
- Tucker, Spencer C. (1999). Vietnam. University Press of Kentucky. ISBN 0-8131-2121-3 – via the Internet Archive.
- ——— (2011). The Encyclopedia of the Vietnam War. ABC-CLIO. ISBN 978-1-85109-961-0 – via Google Books.
- Vaïsse, Maurice, ed. (2000). L'Armée française dans la guerre d'Indochine (1946–1954) [The French Army in the Indochina War (1946–1954)] (in French). Paris: Editions Complexe. ISBN 978-2-87027-810-9.
- Wiest, Andrew, ed. (2006). Rolling Thunder in a Gentle Land. Oxford: Osprey. ISBN 978-1-84603-020-8 – via the Internet Archive.
- Windrow, Martin (1998). The French Indochina War, 1946–1954. Osprey. ISBN 978-1-85532-789-4.
- ——— (2011). The Last Valley: A Political, Social, and Military History. Orion. ISBN 978-1-85109-961-0 – via Google Books.
