= Mitsunobu Nakahara =

Imperial Japanese Army officer (1922–2014)

- Born: 1922; Ehime Prefecture, Empire of Japan
- Died: 12 July 2003 (aged 80–81); Kamakura, Japan
- Military career
- Allegiance: Empire of Japan; DR Vietnam
- Branch: Imperial Japanese Army; Viet Minh
- Service years: 1944–1945 (Japan); 1946-1954 (North Vietnam)
- Rank: Second lieutenant
- Conflicts: World War II; First Indochina War
- Other work: Instructor

Mitsunobu Nakahara (Japanese: 中原光信, 1922 – 12 July 2003) was a soldier in the Imperial Japanese Army and the Viet Minh. He was a second lieutenant in the army and an intelligence officer. At the end of the war, he belonged to the 34th Independent Mixed Brigade of the Army. He participated in the First Indochina War as an instructor at Quang Ngai Army Military Academy. His Vietnamese name is Nguyễn Minh Ngọc.

== Summary ==
Nakahara was born in Ehime Prefecture. After entering Hosei University, he served as the captain of the kendo club. In 1944, he graduated early from Hosei University and joined the Army. The same year, he went to Kumamoto Army Reserve Military Academy and was assigned to Huế, French Indochina where the Japanese Army was stationed. In July 1945, he started contacting the Viet Minh. Immediately after the defeat of Japan during the Second World War, the security forces were recalled to the headquarters in response to an order by a fellow Viet Minh collaborator, Major Igawa Sei, to "withdraw immediately without locking the arms depot, as an emergency situation had arisen". Since the arms depot in the imperial palace in Hue was unmanned, the Viet Minh then raided it for weapons.

Around January 1946, he deserted from a camp for former Imperial Army officers on the Bà Nà Plateau, west of Da Nang, and traveled to Da Nang in a Viet Minh car. After resting for malaria treatment at a temporary administrative institution in Viet Minh, he joined Igawa in Bình Định. On the day of his desertion, about ten junior officers pleaded with him to allow them to accompany him if he intended to join the Viet Minh, but he did not approve out of concern for their future. However, some NCOs from the 34th Independent Mixed Brigade later also deserted and joined the Vietminh.

Thereafter, he concentrated on military training, but in early April, he was sent to Tuy Hòa to help stop the French forces that were moving northward along the coastline. When he returned to headquarters after completing his mission, he found that Igawa was about to lead the Viet Minh to Pleiku, a strategic point on the central plateau. Nakahara requested permission to accompany him, but Igawa would not allow this. On the way to Pleiku, Igawa was ambushed by French troops and killed in action.

In April 1946, Nakahara was appointed as an instructor at soon-to-be-established Quang Ngai Military Academy, by General Nguyễn Sơn, Chairman of the South Anti-War Committee of North Vietnam. At Quang Ngai Army Military Academy, he was an instructor of the 2nd Battalion. It is said that Nakahara advised Nguyen Son to establish this school in accordance with the wishes of Major Igawa. In the same year, when Nguyen Son went to the south-central front for operational guidance, Nakahara accompanied him and gave him some suggestions on how to attack, and succeeded in killing nearly 2,000 French troops and acquiring thousands of guns.

In 1947, the Viet Minh forces were forced to retreat after suffering heavy casualties during the siege of Nam Định. Nakahara advised the regimental headquarters to fire directly at the field artillery, and personally led the operation. Later, Nakahara was appointed as a military councilor directly under Commander-in-Chief Võ Nguyên Giáp and attended the operational meetings of the military center. When the DRV Hanoi Defense Force was trapped by French troops, Nakahara proposed escaping by crossing a river at nighttime to Giap, which was successful. In April 1948, he was appointed as an instructor at the Tran Quoc Toan Military Cadet School along with some other Japanese.

From 1951 to 1954, he worked with several Japanese in the Military Training Department of the General Staff, studying with Vietnamese officers how to fire on planes and how to reliably attack military bases as a matter of tactics to be used on the front lines.

Nakahara was awarded the First Class Victory Medal and the Third Class Military Merit Medal by the Government of the Democratic Republic of Vietnam.

After returning to Japan in the 1950s, he organized and became chairman of the Japan-Vietnam Trade Association, and continued to support North Vietnam during the Vietnam War by importing coal from Ha Long, among other things. He also made efforts to promote economic exchange between Japan and Vietnam.

In 1990, when Vietnamese Foreign Minister Nguyễn Cơ Thạch visited Japan, Nakahara was invited to an official banquet held on the occasion of Thach's visit. Thach, who had been Giap's secretary at the General Headquarters of the Armed Forces, introduced him by saying, "In this seat is Mr. Nguyen Minh Ngoc, with whom I fought in the jungle many years ago. We were together at the General Headquarters, and General Vo Nguyen Giap often consulted Mr. Ngoc's opinions."

== Bibliography ==
- The Road to Vietnam: History and Prospects of Trade between Japan and Vietnam (1995)
