= USS Montague =

Cargo ship of the United States Navy

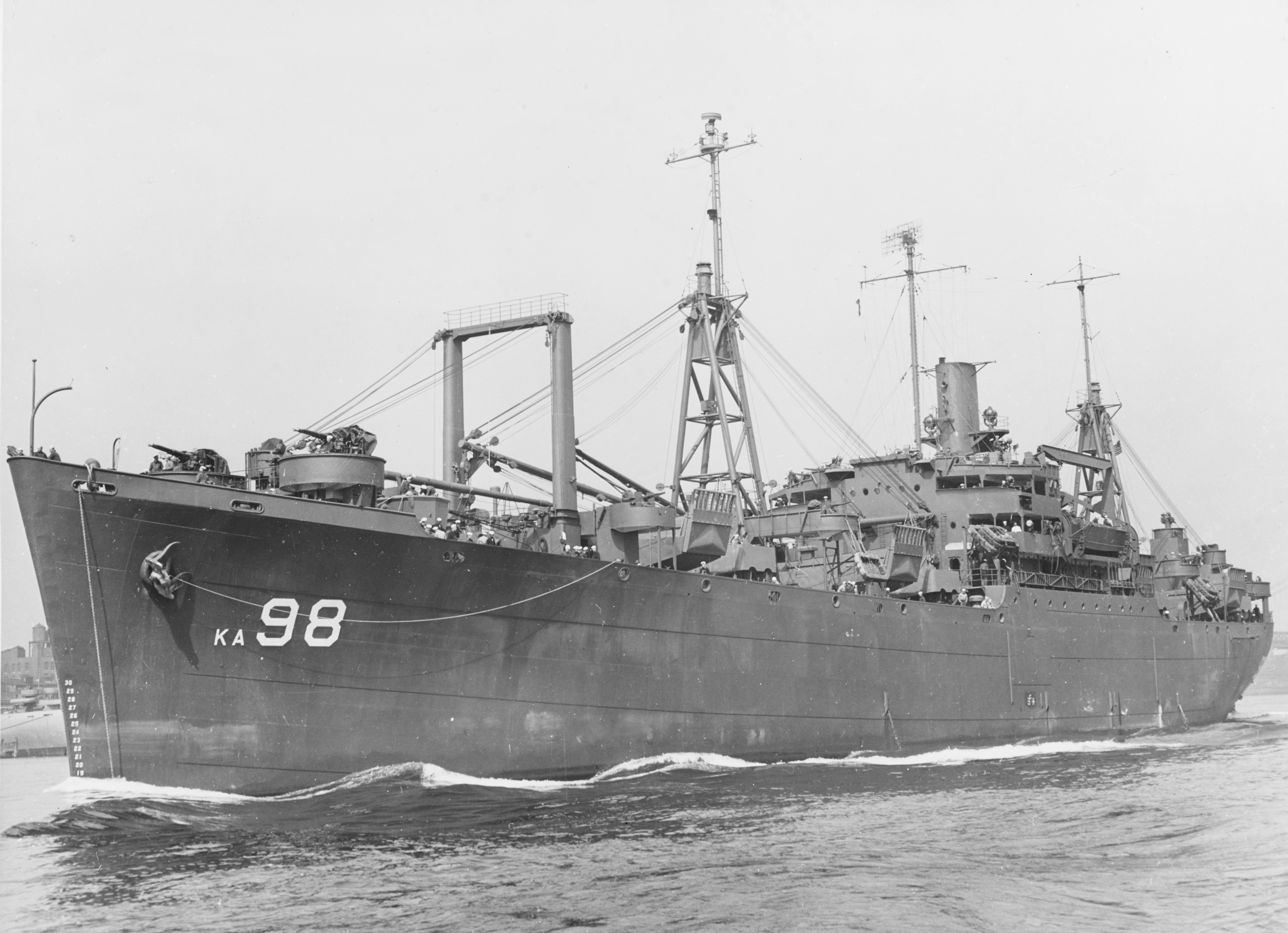
- USS Montague (AKA-98) on 23 April 1945

History

United States
- Name: USS Montague
- Namesake: Montague County, Texas
- Builder: Federal Shipbuilding and Drydock Company, Kearny, New Jersey
- Launched: 12 February 1945
- Commissioned: 12 April 1945
- Decommissioned: 22 November 1955
- Stricken: Unknown
- Honors and awards: 4 battle stars (Korea)
- Fate: Sold for scrapping, 12 March 1971

General characteristics
- Class & type: Andromeda-class attack cargo ship
- Type: Type C2-S-B1
- Displacement: 6,761 long tons (6,869 t)
- Length: 459 ft 2 in (139.95 m)
- Beam: 63 ft (19 m)
- Draft: 26 ft 4 in (8.03 m)
- Speed: 16.5 knots (30.6 km/h; 19.0 mph)
- Complement: 474
- Armament: 1 × 5"/38 caliber gun mount; 4 × twin 40 mm gun mounts; 16 × 20 mm gun mounts

USS Montague (AKA-98) was an Andromeda-class attack cargo ship named after a county in Texas. She served as a commissioned ship for 10 years and 7 months.

Montague (AKA–98), was built under United States Maritime Commission contract by the Federal Shipbuilding and Drydock Co., Kearny, N.J.; launched on 12 February 1945; sponsored by Mrs. Irving S. Olds; and commissioned on 13 April 1945.

== Service history ==
After shakedown in the Chesapeake Bay, Montague proceeded to Hawaii, arriving Pearl Harbor on 10 June 1945. She departed Pearl Harbor on 2 July 1945, unloading her cargo on 10 July 1945 at Eniwetok. The Montague departed Eniwetok on 13 July 1945.

According to eyewitness accounts, "On the way to Ulithi we were attacked by submarines with torpedo spotted aft and just missing her fantail. Arrived Ulithi, Caroline Islands 17 July. Left 29 July and on the way to Okinawa a huge storm almost washed me off the ship. Arrived Okinawa Ryukyu Islands August,5. While there we were practicing "hitting" the beach with full crew and equipment on our 'Higgins boat' in preparation for the invasion of Japan. Also when we were under attack by Kamikaze aircraft our smokepots protected us. The wind blew away the protection on some other ships at anchor. 6 Aug it was announced that the first atomic bomb had been dropped. Left Okinawa 12 Aug.. Shortly after that, Aug.14, the war was declared over.Thereafter she shuttled cargo, {Okinawa, Jinsen Korea, NagoWan Okinawa, Taku China, Nagushi Okinawa,(back and forth)arriving in Guam 17 October and back and forth again (Taku, and Tsingtao China). Left Tsingtau 2 Dec and Arrived Pearl harbor Dec.15. Left 17 Dec to arrive Canal Zone (and liberty) Dec.31. Left Canal Zone 1 Jan 1946 and arrived U.S.via Norfolk 6 Jan 1946."

The USS Montague operated off the east coast of the United States for the next two years, and participated in training exercises in the Caribbean. Getting underway from Norfolk, Virginia, on 3 January 1948, she sailed for duty with the 6th Fleet, helping to stabilize the postwar situation in the Mediterranean. She returned to Norfolk on 15 March 1948, and participated in amphibious exercises off the east coast before getting underway on 13 September 1948 to join the 6th Fleet in the Mediterranean, returning Morehead City, North Carolina on 24 January 1949. The following 15 months were spent training off the east coast, and in the Caribbean.

She departed Morehead City on 2 May 1950 for her third tour of duty with the 6th Fleet. Receiving orders to support United Nations action in Korea in August, she transited the Suez Canal, arriving at Kobe, Japan on 9 September 1950. Anchored off Inchon, she disembarked troops and cargo from 8 to 16 October 1950. After a voyage to Kobe she embarked troops at Inchon, disembarking them at Wonsan on the east coast. Then she sailed to Chinnampo, the port city of the North Korean capital, to embark refugees. She continued to operate between Hŭngnam and Wonsan, and the port of Pusan until returning to Japan on 29 December 1950. She sailed between Korea and Japan for three months, before sailing home, arriving San Diego, on 28 April 1951.

Between 1951 and 1954, Montague made three more voyages to the Far East, visiting ports in the Philippines, Japan, Vietnam and Korea. On her last tour of duty, she departed Japan on 2 August 1954, and proceeded to Indochina to take part in Operation Passage to Freedom, shuttling refugees from North to South Vietnam following the French defeat in the First Indochina War. She returned to the west coast, and anchored on 9 October 1954 at Long Beach.

=== Decommissioning and sale ===
The USS Montague was decommissioned on 22 November 1955, was berthed at Mare Island, California as a unit of the Pacific Reserve Fleet and was transferred to the Maritime Administration on 29 January 1960. Berthed as a unit of the National Defense Reserve Fleet at Olympia, Washington, the ship was sold for scrapping on 12 March 1971 to the West Waterway Lumber Company.

== Awards ==
Montague received five [battle stars] for Korean and Southeast Asia (Okinawa)service.
