= October 2017 Vietnam tropical depression =

Western Pacific tropical depression in 2017

Tropical Depression 23W
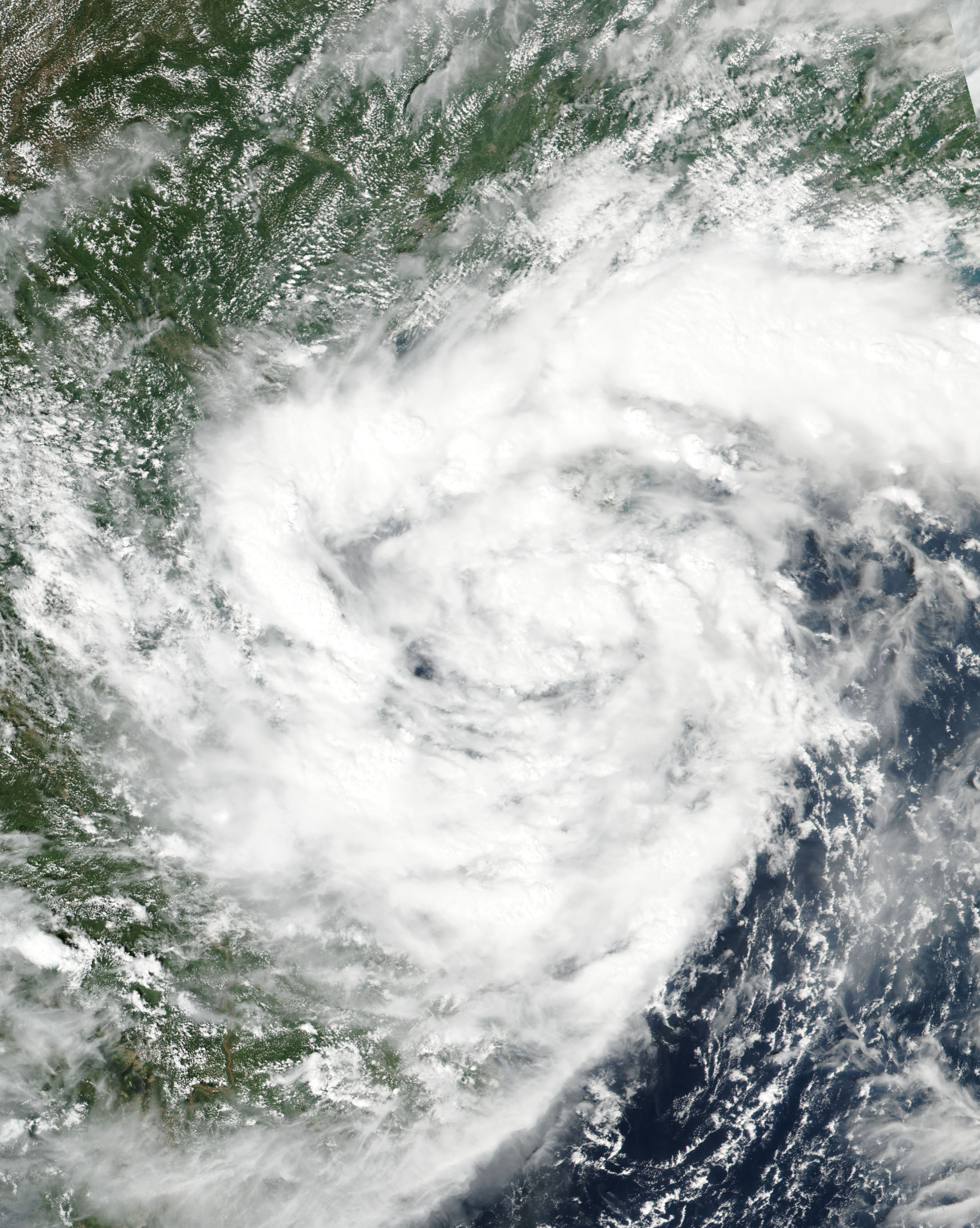
- Tropical Depression 23W at peak intensity over Hainan Island on October 9

Meteorological history
- Formed: October 7, 2017
- Dissipated: October 10, 2017

Tropical depression
- 10-minute sustained (JMA)
- Highest winds: 55 km/h (35 mph)
- Lowest pressure: 1000 hPa (mbar); 29.53 inHg

Tropical depression
- 1-minute sustained (SSHWS/JTWC)
- Highest winds: 55 km/h (35 mph)
- Lowest pressure: 999 hPa (mbar); 29.50 inHg

Overall effects
- Fatalities: 109 total
- Damage: $609 million (2017 USD)
- Areas affected: Philippines, South China, Vietnam, Laos, Thailand
- IBTrACS
- Part of the 2017 Pacific typhoon season

The October 2017 Vietnam tropical depression, also known by its designation as Tropical Depression 23W, was a weak but deadly system that brought torrential rainfall and extreme flooding over northern and central Vietnam in October 2017. The depression formed on October 7, located to the northwest of Luzon, Philippines. The system moved in a general westward direction as it steadily intensified. Despite being forecast to strengthen into a tropical storm, 23W failed to reach this intensity, due to lack of organization as it made landfall in Hà Tĩnh Province on October 10.

== Meteorological history ==
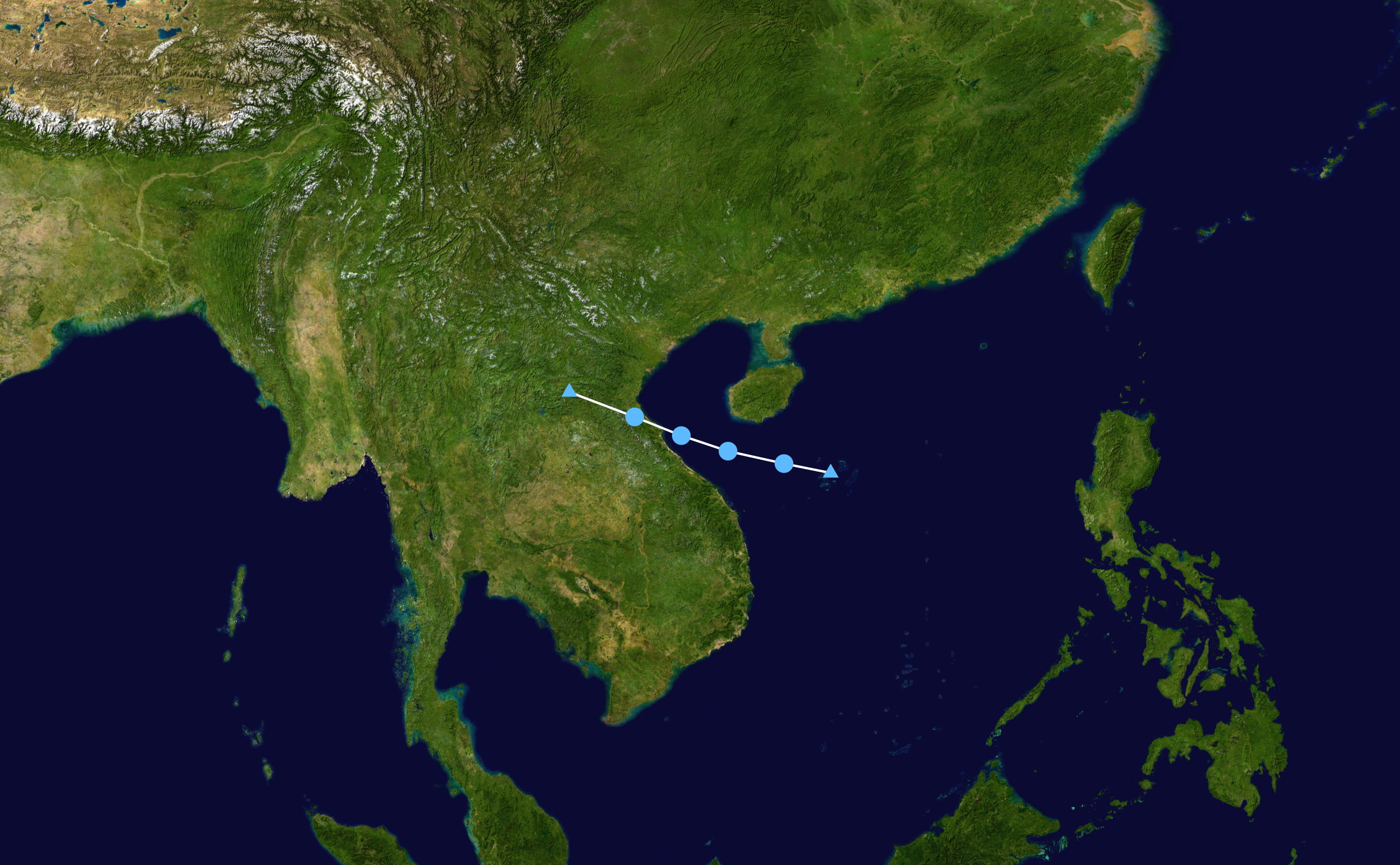
Map plotting the storm's track and intensity, according to the Saffir–Simpson scale Map key Saffir–Simpson scale Tropical depression (≤38 mph, ≤62 km/h) Tropical storm (39–73 mph, 63–118 km/h) Category 1 (74–95 mph, 119–153 km/h) Category 2 (96–110 mph, 154–177 km/h) Category 3 (111–129 mph, 178–208 km/h) Category 4 (130–156 mph, 209–251 km/h) Category 5 (≥157 mph, ≥252 km/h) Unknown Storm type Tropical cyclone Subtropical cyclone Extratropical cyclone, remnant low, tropical disturbance, or monsoon depression

During October 6, the United States Joint Typhoon Warning Center (JTWC) started to monitor a tropical disturbance, that had developed about 1,010 km (630 mi) to the east of Manila in the Philippines. The system had a broad low level circulation centre, while atmospheric convection associated with the system was displaced to the northeast of the centre. The system was also located within a favourable environment for further slow development, with low to moderate vertical windshear and very warm sea surface temperatures of 30–32 °C (86–90 °F). Over the next couple of days, the disturbance organised slightly, with atmospheric convection to the south of the disturbance improving as it moved westwards. During October 7, the Japan Meteorological Agency (JMA) reported that the disturbance had developed into a tropical depression, before the system passed over the Philippine island of Luzon.

By 10:00 UTC of October 8, the JTWC had issued a Tropical Cyclone Formation Alert, while the JMA had determined that the system had winds of 55 km/h (35 mph). Several hours later, the JTWC began issuing advisories and upgraded the system to a tropical depression, giving the designation of 23W. The JMA followed suit and began issuing advisories three hours later on October 9.

== Preparations and impact ==
=== Vietnam ===
Costliest tropical cyclones in Vietnam
Rank	Storm	Season	Damage		Ref.
Rank	Storm	Season	VND	USD	Ref.
1	Yagi	2024	84.5 trillion	$3.47 billion	
2	Bualoi	2025	23.9 trillion	$950 million	
3	Damrey	2017	22.7 trillion	$1 billion	
4	Matmo	2025	21 trillion	$837 million	
5	Doksuri	2017	18.4 trillion	$809 million	
6	Ketsana	2009	16.1 trillion	$896 million	
7	Wutip	2013	13.6 trillion	$648 million	
8	Molave	2020	13.3 trillion	$573 million	
9	TD 23W	2017	13.1 trillion	$579 million	
10	Kalmaegi	2025	13.1 trillion	$521 million	

Damage by Province in Vietnam
Province	Damage (VND)	Damage (2017 USD)	Ref
Thanh Hoá	3.335 trillion	$147 million	
Hoà Bình	2.473 trillion	$109 million	
Hanoi	1.409 trillion	$62 million	
Ninh Bình	1.052 trillion	$46.3 million	
Sơn La	814 billion	$35.8 million	
Nghe An	758 billion	$33.4 million	
Yen Bai	700 billion	$30.8 million	
Ha Nam	277 billion	$12.2 million	
Thái Bình	130 billion	$5.72 million	
Phu Tho	22.8 billion	$1 million	
Other provinces	2.1 trillion	$92.4 million	
Totals:	13 trillion	$579 million	

Despite being a weak system, 23W caused severe damage in many provinces across northern Vietnam. Rainfall of 100–150 mm (3.9–5.9 in) was recorded in the northern and central parts of the country, especially in the provinces of Nghệ An and Hà Tĩnh. Many hydroelectric dams and lakes had to be discharged and the Ministry of Industry and Trade established a working group to ensure the safety of 31 hydroelectric lakes. Heavy rainfall contributed to flash flooding, with five people swept away and an additional five injured in the district of Trạm Tấu, Yên Bái Province. Rescuers saved 28 people from the "danger zone". About 740 houses were flooded, with 30 ending up fully destroyed. The authorities mobilized some 2,200 people, including the military, police, Youth Union and civil defense offices, accompanied by a variety of means to search for missing victims, as well as support the people in the area. Moreover, the Red River was forecast to reach water levels of 3–50 cm (1.2–19.7 in).

On October 12, a landslide occurred in a district in Hòa Bình Province, burying four households. The number of flooded houses rose to 16,700. More than 39,300 hectares of crops were damaged along with two dikes. Around 1,200 cattle and roughly 40,000 fowl were either killed or swept away by flooding and landslides. Rainfall in Mai Châu District, Hoà Bình Province, reached 390 mm (15.3 in), while Kim Bôi District, Hoà Bình Province, had a total of 450 mm (17.7 in). In Lương Sơn District, Hoà Bình Province, 13 hectares of rice were damaged along with 97 hectares of other agriculture crops and 7 hectares of fruit trees. 6 km of roads and 4 km of canal were also damaged due to the flooding. The Vietnam Red Cross offered about 250 million ₫ (US$11 thousand) to families affected by a landslide in Phú Cường, Tân Lạc District, Hòa Bình Province.

Losses from damage in Yên Bái Province are estimated at 500 billion ₫ (US$22 million), while Sơn La Province had 59 billion ₫ (US$2.6 million) and Phú Thọ Province had 22.8 billion ₫ (US$1 million). Lương Sơn district, Hoà Bình Province, suffered damage of about 25 billion ₫ (US$1.1 million), and Lạc Sơn District, Hoà Bình Province, suffered damages of about 16 billion ₫ (US$704 thousand). Hoa Binh province had total damages of 46 billion ₫ (US$2.02 million), including 9 billion ₫ (US$396 thousand) from Ky Son. As of October 15, at least 68 people lost their lives; additionally, 30 were injured, and 34 are still missing. Almost half of the dead (26 people) were in Hoà Bình Province. In total, 100 people were killed and damages reached over 13 trillion ₫ (US$572 million).

=== Thailand ===
Despite making landfall in Vietnam, 23W triggered severe flooding in Thailand and killed a total of 9 people. As of October 19, damage from flooding estimated at US$30 million.

== Humanitarian Response and Relief Efforts ==
A comprehensive humanitarian response was swiftly mobilized to address the urgent needs of affected communities across northern and central Vietnam. The Vietnam Red Cross, along with various local non-governmental organizations (NGOs) and international aid organizations such as the United Nations Development Programme (UNDP), played a pivotal role in the immediate aftermath, distributing essential supplies such as food, clean water, clothing, and shelter materials to the displaced populations.

== See also ==
- Weather of 2017
- Tropical cyclones in 2017
- Tropical Depression 18W (2013)
- Tropical Storm Aere (2016)
- Tropical Storm Sonca (2017)
- Tropical Storm Son-Tinh (2018)
- Tropical Storm Linfa (2020)
