= Typhoon Dan (1989) =

Pacific typhoon in 1989

Typhoon Dan (Saling)
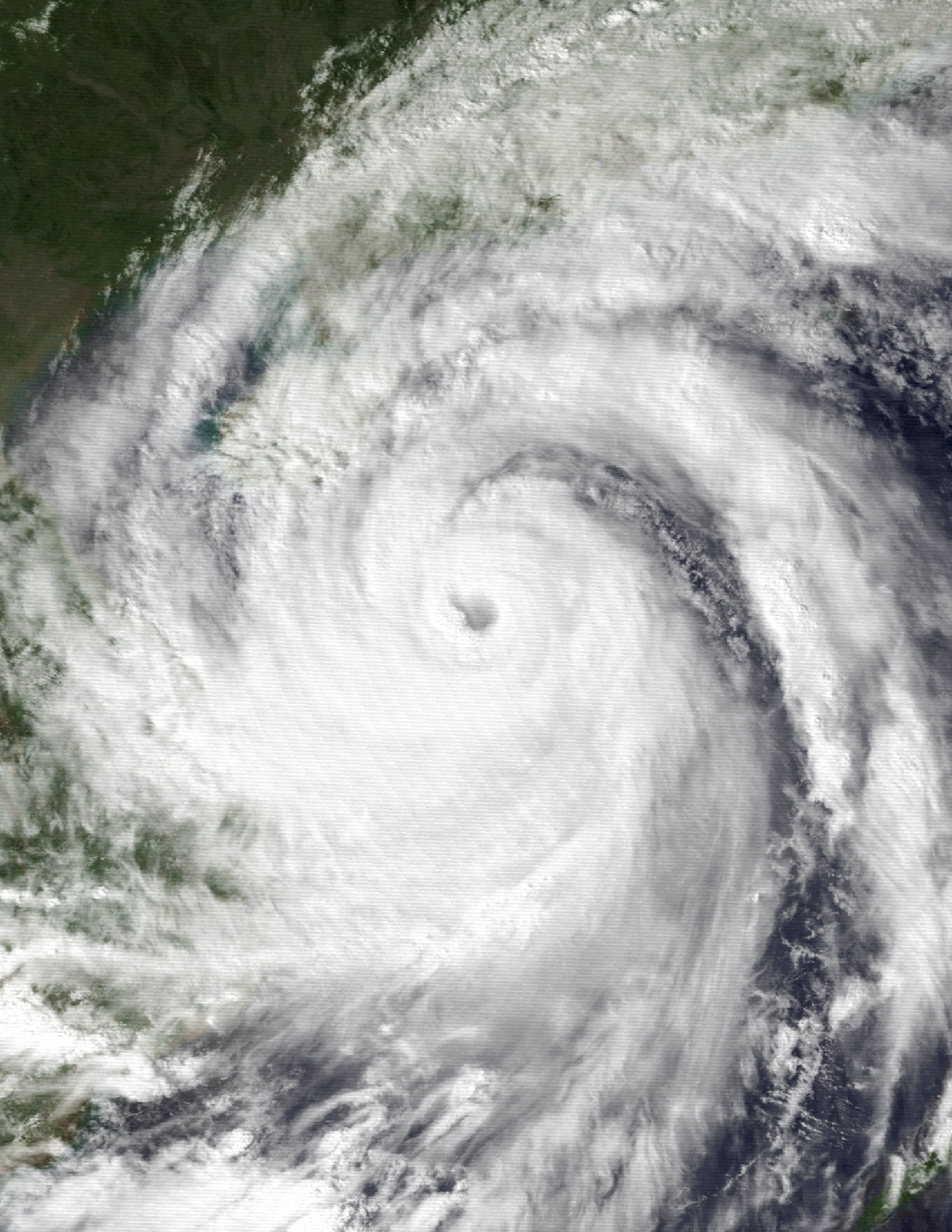
- Typhoon Dan on October 12, 1989

Meteorological history
- Formed: October 6, 1989
- Dissipated: October 13, 1989

Typhoon
- 10-minute sustained (JMA)
- Highest winds: 140 km/h (85 mph)
- Lowest pressure: 960 hPa (mbar); 28.35 inHg

Category 1-equivalent typhoon
- 1-minute sustained (SSHWS/JTWC)
- Highest winds: 130 km/h (80 mph)
- Lowest pressure: 972 hPa (mbar); 28.70 inHg

Overall effects
- Fatalities: 101
- Damage: $59.2 million (1989 USD)
- Areas affected: Philippines and Vietnam
- IBTrACS
- Part of the 1989 Pacific typhoon season

Typhoon Dan, known in the Philippines as Typhoon Saling, was the third of a series of tropical cyclones that impacted the Philippines and Vietnam in October 1989. The storm developed on October 6, and tracked generally westward throughout its course. After crossing Luzon, the typhoon emerged into the South China Sea and reached its peak intensity, with sustained 10-minute winds of 140 km/h (85 mph), 1-minute winds of 130 km/h (80 mph), and a minimum barometric pressure of 960 millibars. The storm moved ashore in central Vietnam and dissipated after moving inland. The storm caused extensive damage throughout its course. In the Philippines, Dan left hundreds of thousands homeless and killed 58 people. Power outages were extensive in the Manila region. In Vietnam, the storm's high winds and heavy rains caused extensive damage and loss of life. More than 500,000 structures were damaged or destroyed and at least 43 people were killed across the country.

== Meteorological history ==
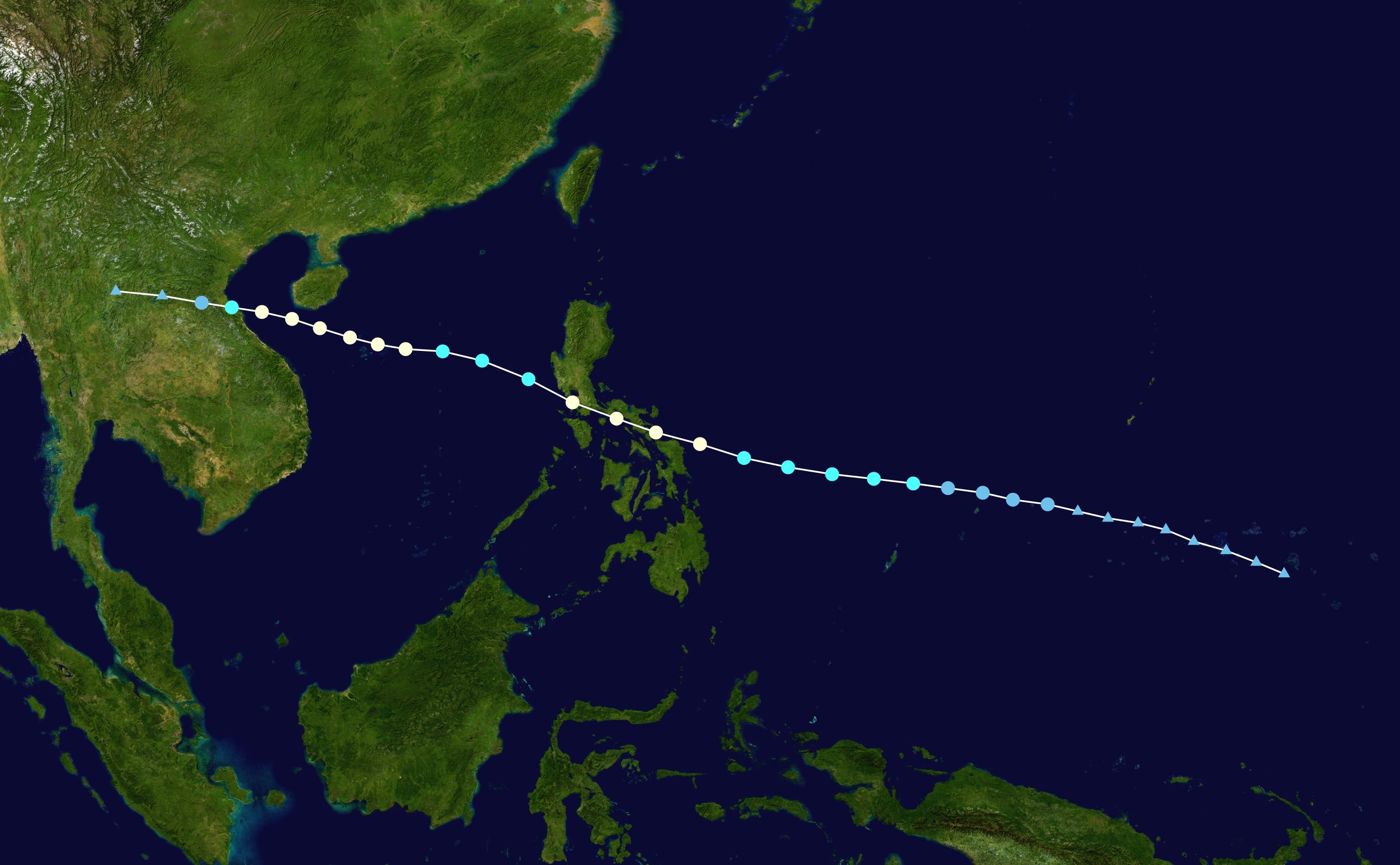
Map plotting the storm's track and intensity, according to the Saffir–Simpson scale Map key Saffir–Simpson scale Tropical depression (≤38 mph, ≤62 km/h) Tropical storm (39–73 mph, 63–118 km/h) Category 1 (74–95 mph, 119–153 km/h) Category 2 (96–110 mph, 154–177 km/h) Category 3 (111–129 mph, 178–208 km/h) Category 4 (130–156 mph, 209–251 km/h) Category 5 (≥157 mph, ≥252 km/h) Unknown Storm type Tropical cyclone Subtropical cyclone Extratropical cyclone, remnant low, tropical disturbance, or monsoon depression

On October 6, 1989, a tropical disturbance formed in the monsoon trough near the island of Chuuk. An advisory by the Joint Typhoon Warning Center (JTWC) assessed the system as having a "poor" chance to develop due to strong wind shear in the region. (Note: The Joint Typhoon Warning Center is a joint United States Navy – United States Air Force task force that issues tropical cyclone warnings for the western Pacific Ocean and other regions.) A day later, the potential of development was adjusted to "fair". On October 8, the wind shear relented and a well-defined band persisted near the storm's center of circulation. As a result, a Tropical Cyclone Formation Alert was issued. That same day, the Japan Meteorological Agency (JMA) classified the storm as a tropical depression. (Note: The Japan Meteorological Agency is the official Regional Specialized Meteorological Center for the western Pacific Ocean.) At 1200 UTC, the JTWC issued their first warning on Tropical Depression 29W. At the time, it was centered about 70 mi (110 km) northeast of Yap.

About 18 hours later, the depression was upgraded to a tropical storm and given the name Dan. The cyclone moved westward at 17 to 23 mph (27 to 37 km/h), and convection continued to mature. Outflow was good across most of the system, except the northwestern corner where it was restricted by interaction with a nearby typhoon. Due to the cyclone's proximity to the Philippines, the Philippine Atmospheric, Geophysical and Astronomical Services Administration also monitored the storm, assigning it with the local name Saling. The JMA upgraded it to a tropical storm on October 9; both agencies recognized it as a typhoon the next day after an eye became visible and outflow improved in the northwestern quadrant. Dan made landfall on the southeastern coast of Luzon in the Philippines, and its center tracked just south of Ninoy Aquino International Airport.

Dan crossed over the island and emerged into the South China Sea, having lost its eye feature and weakened back into a tropical storm. Convection soon redeveloped as the storm moved northwestward through warm waters. The JTWC reports that Dan reattained typhoon status at 0000 UTC on October 12, although according to the JMA it did so 24 hours earlier. The typhoon continued to intensify, and the JTWC estimates that it reached its peak intensity at 0600 UTC, with 1-minute maximum sustained winds of 130 km/h (80 mph). The JMA indicates that Dan peaked slightly afterward, with 10-minute sustained winds of 140 km/h (85 mph) and a minimum barometric pressure reading of 960 millibars.

The storm passed about 70 mi (110 km) south of Hainan Island and weakened somewhat. Increased wind shear further deteriorated the system as it approached the coast of Vietnam. The storm moved inland at around 1200 UTC on October 13, at which point the JMA downgraded it to a severe tropical storm and the JTWC issued their final advisory on the disturbance. The circulation ultimately dissipated over the mountainous terrain and its remnants continued to move westward into Laos.

== Impact ==
Although it was relatively weak, the storm caused severe damage. In the Philippines, 58 fatalities from the cyclone were reported, with an additional 121 injuries. In total, 682,699 people, or 135,245 families, were affected by the typhoon, and 49,972 houses sustained damage. Monetary storm damage is placed at $59.2 million. The storm triggered flooding and landslides, while high winds, estimated up to 160 km/h (99 mph) brought down trees and powerlines. The second typhoon to strike the country within a week, Dan forced schools and government offices to close. Approximately 250,000 people were left homeless, and dozens of fishermen went missing offshore. In the Manila area, near-total power loss was reported. President Corazon Aquino issued a "state of calamity" there and in surrounding areas. In the wake of the storm, the nation's military provided $300,000 worth of food for residents in evacuation centers. The Department of Social Welfare and Development also provided $371,000 worth of emergency relief assistance to 2,700 families displaced by the storm. Despite the scale of damage from Dan and other typhoons in the region, no request for international assistance was made by the Philippine Government. As the storm progressed westward, it buffeted Hainan Island with gale-force winds and exacerbated damage caused by Typhoons Angela and Brian. Collectively, the three storms were responsible for 63 fatalities on the island, most of which were attributed to Brian.

Damage in Vietnam was also extensive. The high winds, reportedly blowing at 75 mph (121 km/h), ripped roofs off houses. Large storm tides along the coast pushed flood waters ashore. At least 43 people were killed and another 466 were injured by the storm throughout Vietnam. The most severe damage took place in Hà Tĩnh Province where 34 fatalities took place. In the province alone, 43,000 homes were destroyed and another 500,000 were damaged. Extensive flooding across the province submerged 330,000 acres (130,000 ha) of crops and killed thousands of cattle. In Hải Hưng Province, two people were killed and approximately 60 percent of the homes were damaged or destroyed. Another seven people perished in Thái Bình Province due to strong winds.

== See also ==
- Typhoon Dot (1985)
- Typhoon Wutip (2013)
- Typhoon Doksuri (2017)
- Typhoon Bualoi (2025)
