= Trạm Tấu district =

Coordinates: 21.500°N 104.417°E

Trạm Tấu District Huyện Trạm Tấu
- District
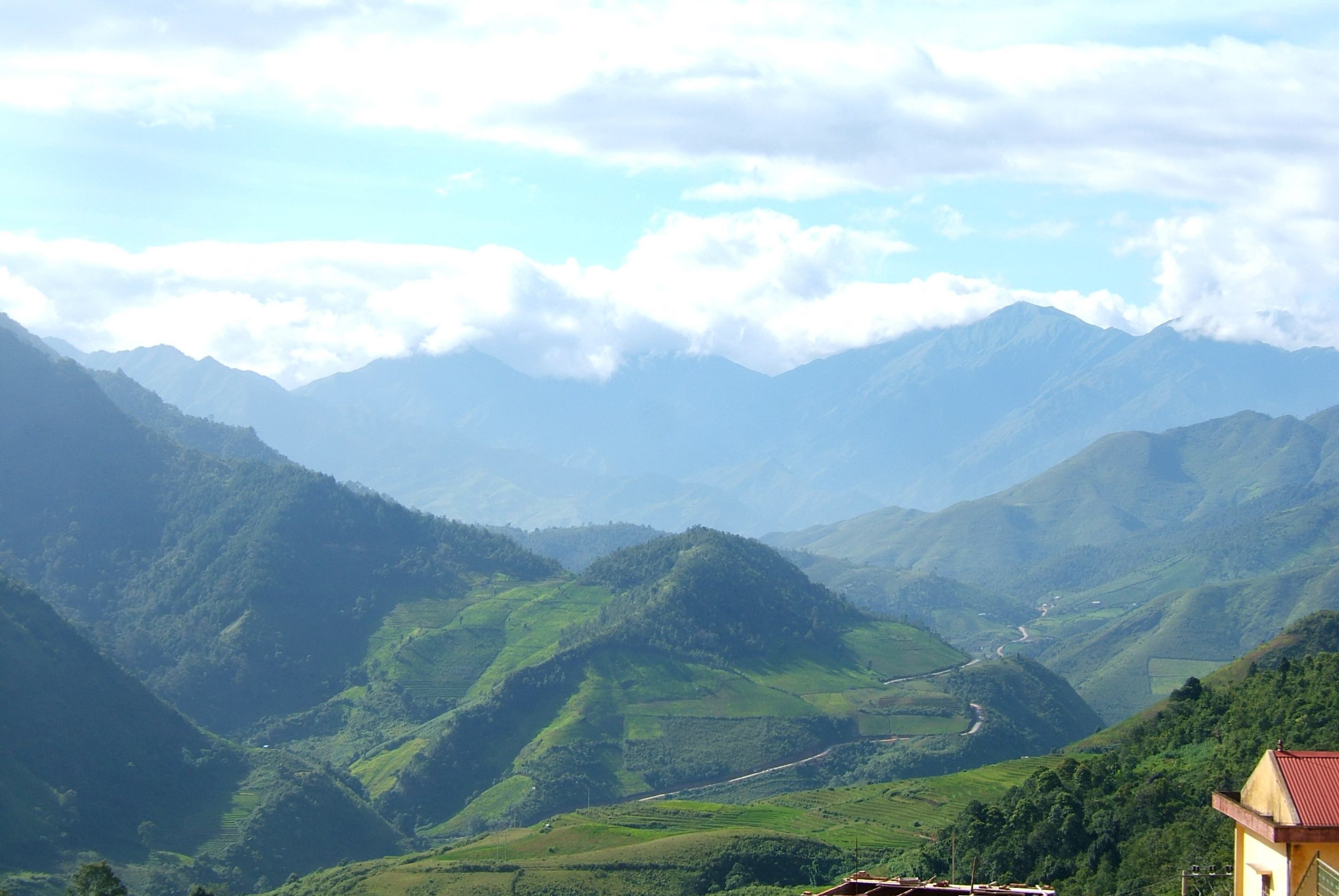
- Interactive map of Trạm Tấu District
- Country: Vietnam
- Region: Northeast
- Province: Yên Bái
- Capital: Trạm Tấu

Area
  - Total: 286 sq mi (742 km^{2})

Population (2003)
  - Total: 21,887
- Time zone: UTC+7 (UTC + 7)

Trạm Tấu is a former rural district of Yên Bái province, in the Northeast region of Vietnam. As of 2019, the district had a population of 33,962. The district covers an area of 742 km^{2}. The district capital lies at Trạm Tấu.
