= Typhoon Matmo (2025) =

Pacific typhoon in 2025

Typhoon Matmo (Paolo)
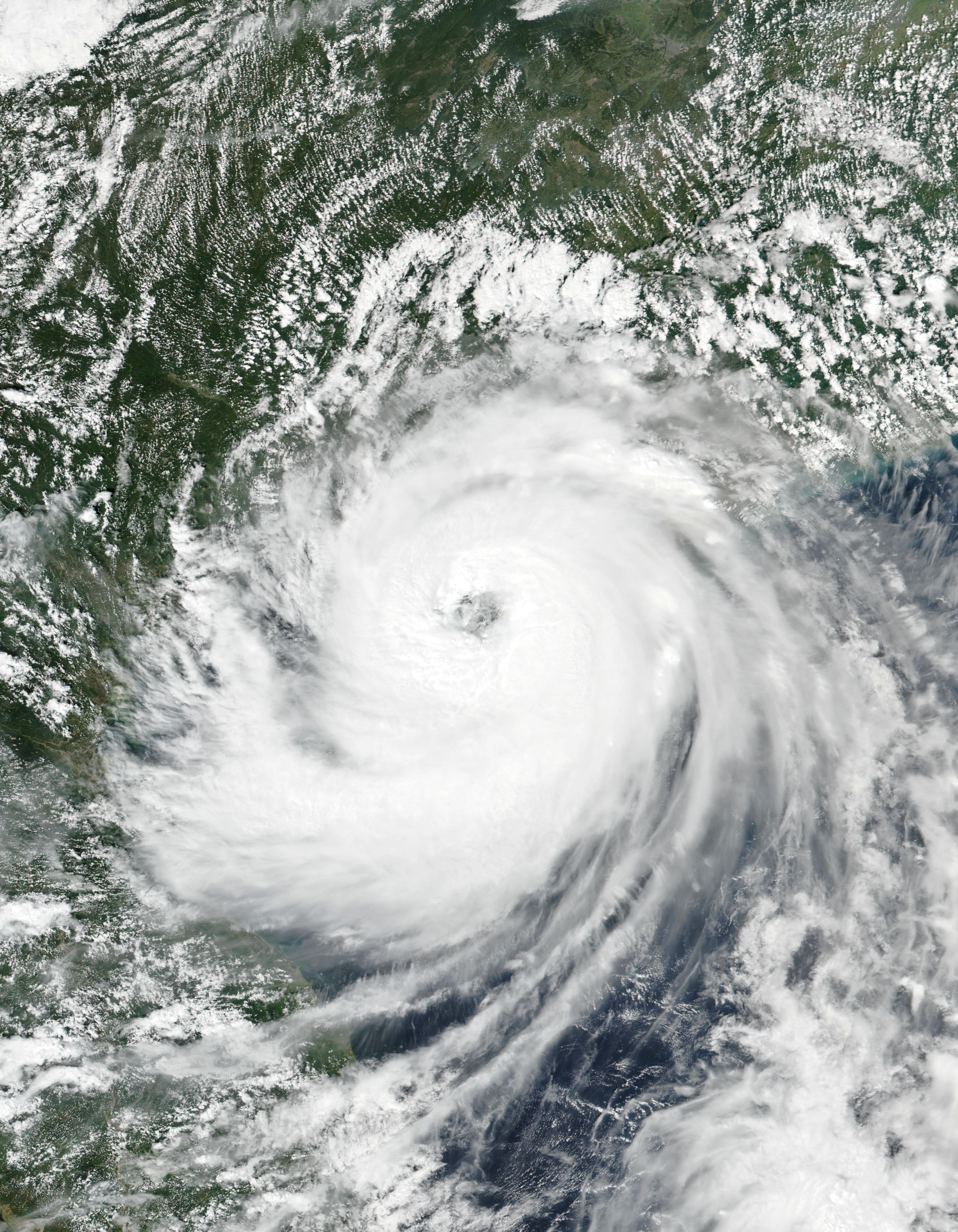
- Matmo approaching Leizhou Peninsula near its peak intensity on October 5

Meteorological history
- Formed: September 30, 2025
- Dissipated: October 6, 2025

Typhoon
- 10-minute sustained (JMA)
- Highest winds: 130 km/h (80 mph)
- Lowest pressure: 975 hPa (mbar); 28.79 inHg

Category 2-equivalent typhoon
- 1-minute sustained (SSHWS/JTWC)
- Highest winds: 155 km/h (100 mph)
- Lowest pressure: 966 hPa (mbar); 28.53 inHg

Overall effects
- Fatalities: 39+
- Injuries: 10+
- Missing: 2+
- Damage: $3.17 billion (2025 USD) (Fourth-costliest in Vietnamese history)
- Areas affected: Philippines; particularly Northern Luzon; Central Luzon; Macau; South China; particularly Western Guangdong; Hainan; Southern Guangxi; Northern Vietnam; Thailand
- Part of the 2025 Pacific typhoon season

Typhoon Matmo, (Note: The name Matmo (Chamorro: måtmo, [mɑtmo]) was contributed by the United States and means "heavy rain" in Chamorro.) known in the Philippines as Typhoon Paolo, was a strong and devastating tropical cyclone that caused record-breaking rainfall and historic river crests, unleashing widespread flooding in northern and north central Vietnam in early October 2025. The storm also affected the Philippines, Macau, and southern China. Matmo is the twenty-first named storm and the eighth typhoon of the 2025 Pacific typhoon season, Matmo originated from an area of convection north-northeast of Yap which became a tropical depression on October 1.

As Matmo is inside the Philippine Area of Responsibility (PAR), it was assigned the local name Paolo by the Philippine Atmospheric, Geophysical and Astronomical Services Administration (PAGASA). Under favorable conditions, Matmo gradually intensified into a Category 1-equivalent typhoon before the system made landfall over Dinapigue, Isabela on October 3. Matmo later weakened as it crossed through the Cordillera Central. It reemerged through the West Philippine Sea, where it further intensified into a Category 2-typhoon as it moved westwards. Matmo later made two separate landfalls in Southern China. It later crossed through the Gulf of Tonkin before it made another landfall in Fangchenggang in Guangxi Province on October 6. Matmo was last noted in the vicinity of Yunnan on October 7.

Matmo generated extensive flooding and landslides across the Philippines, Vietnam and Thailand resulting in at least 39 deaths.

== Meteorological history ==
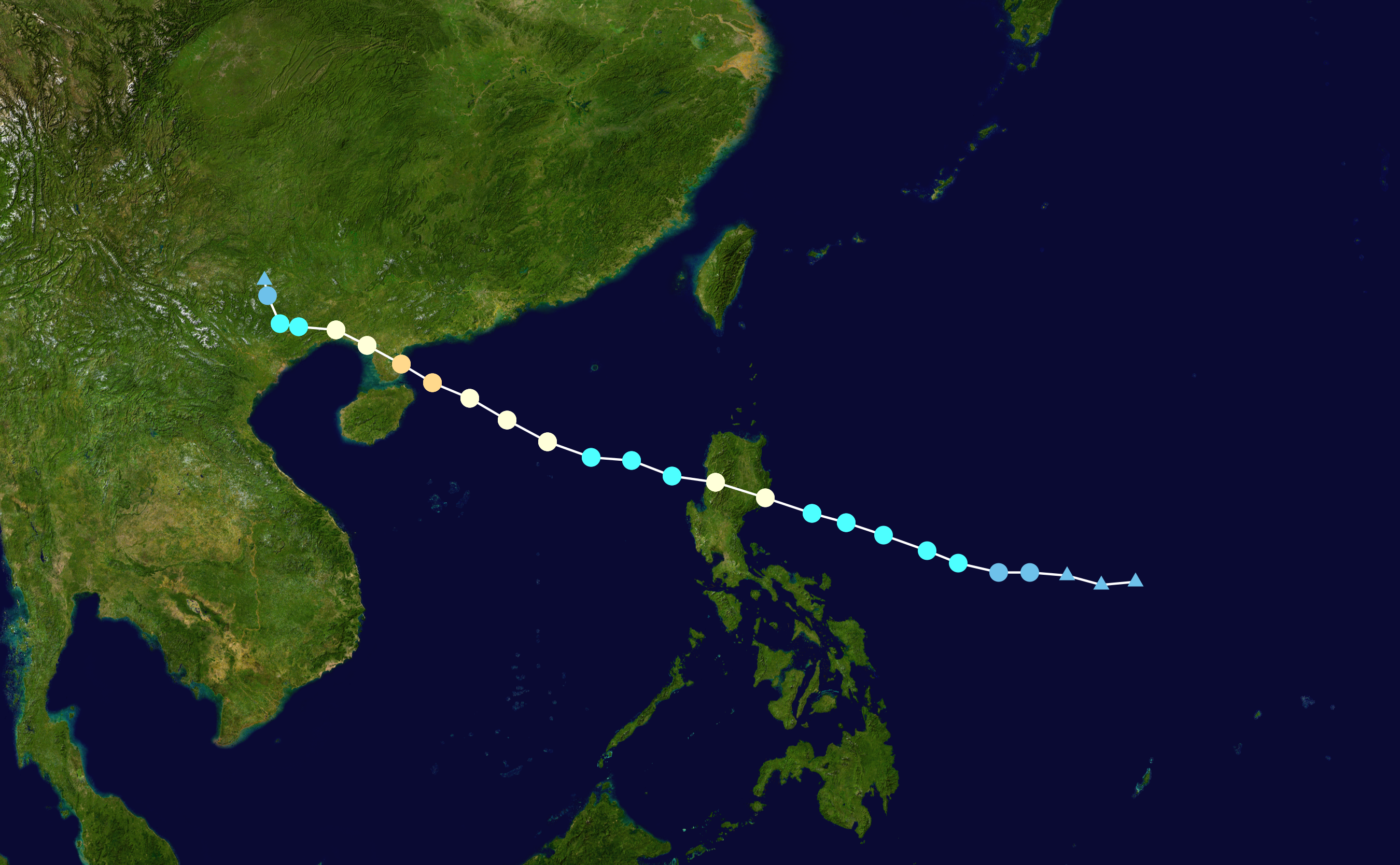
Map plotting the storm's track and intensity, according to the Saffir–Simpson scale Map key Saffir–Simpson scale Tropical depression (≤38 mph, ≤62 km/h) Tropical storm (39–73 mph, 63–118 km/h) Category 1 (74–95 mph, 119–153 km/h) Category 2 (96–110 mph, 154–177 km/h) Category 3 (111–129 mph, 178–208 km/h) Category 4 (130–156 mph, 209–251 km/h) Category 5 (≥157 mph, ≥252 km/h) Unknown Storm type Tropical cyclone Subtropical cyclone Extratropical cyclone, remnant low, tropical disturbance, or monsoon depression

On September 29, the Joint Typhoon Warning Center (JTWC) identified a low-pressure area approximately 241 nautical miles (446 km) north-northeast of Yap in the Federated States of Micronesia. Satellite imagery indicated a weak area turning with disorganized convective activity, primarily along the system's western boundary. The disturbance later entered the Philippine Area of Responsibility (PAR) and was named Paolo by the Philippine Atmospheric, Geophysical and Astronomical Services Administration (PAGASA) around 08:00 PHT (00:00 UTC) on October 1, with the Japan Meteorological Agency (JMA) (Note: The JMA is the Regional Specialized Meteorological Centre (RSMC) for the Western North Pacific.) also starting advisories and classifying it as a tropical depression. The JTWC also issued a Tropical Cyclone Formation Alert (TCFA) later that same day, citing tropical cyclone formation within the next 12 to 24 hours. The agency later followed suit and designated Paolo as 27W, with fragmented banding and flaring convection around the low-level circulation center (LLCC).

Both agencies upgraded 27W into a tropical storm on the following day, with the JMA assigning it the international name Matmo as it tracked west-northwestward. At 23:00 PHT (15:00 UTC), the PAGASA upgraded Matmo to a severe tropical storm, as satellite imagery showed improved organization, with deep convective banding wrapping into the LLCC, embedded in a favorable environment. The‌ JMA later followed suit and also upgraded the system to a severe tropical storm early on October 3.

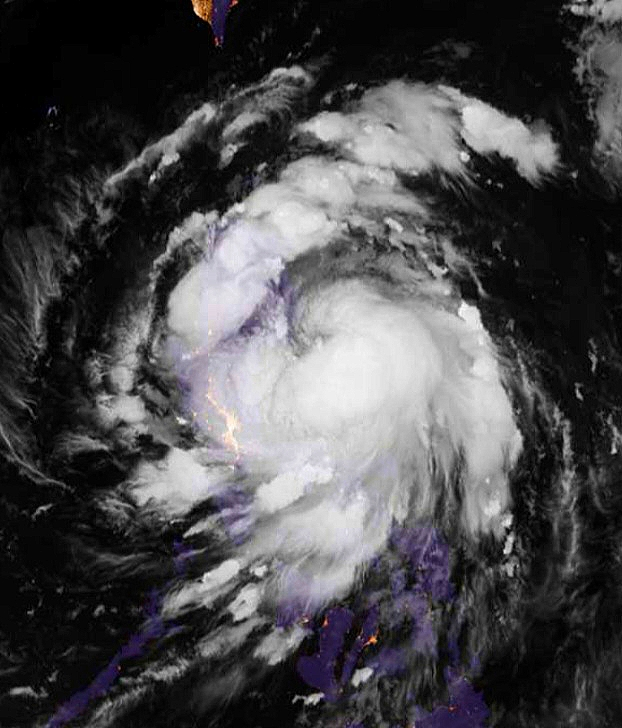
Matmo nearing landfall at Luzon, Philippines on October 3

Both the JTWC and the PAGASA subsequently upgraded Matmo to a minimal typhoon before it made landfall over Dinapigue, Isabela. As the typhoon brushed over Northern Luzon, a satellite imagery revealed a well-defined deep convective banding pattern wrapping into the LLCC of Matmo, featuring an impressive central dense overcast (CDO) and extensive feeder bands extending well beyond the island's perimeter. The PAGASA and the JTWC later downgraded Matmo to a mid-range tropical storm before it reemerged over the West Philippine Sea near Santa Cruz, Ilocos Sur at 17:00 PHT.

The JTWC re-upgraded Matmo to a typhoon at around 09:00 UTC on October 4 as it showed improving convective banding around the LLCC and cooling cloud tops cooled over the previous six hours. On the following day, Matmo reached its peak intensity of a Category 2-equivalent typhoon, with estimated one-minute sustained winds of 165 km/h (89 kn) and a minimum central pressure of 968 hPa (28.6 inHg). It made landfall over Naozhou Island and Donghai Island near Mazhang District and Xuwen County on the Leizhou Peninsula on October 5 at 14:50 CST (06:50 UTC). It made another landfall over Fangchenggang, Guangxi Province early on October 6 at 01:10 CST after it entered the Gulf of Tonkin. The Hong Kong Observatory (HKO) last noted its position at 18:00 UTC on October 6 as a low-pressure area to be 23.0°N 105.2°E, 122 nautical miles (226 km) north-northwest from Hanoi.

== Preparations ==
=== Philippines ===
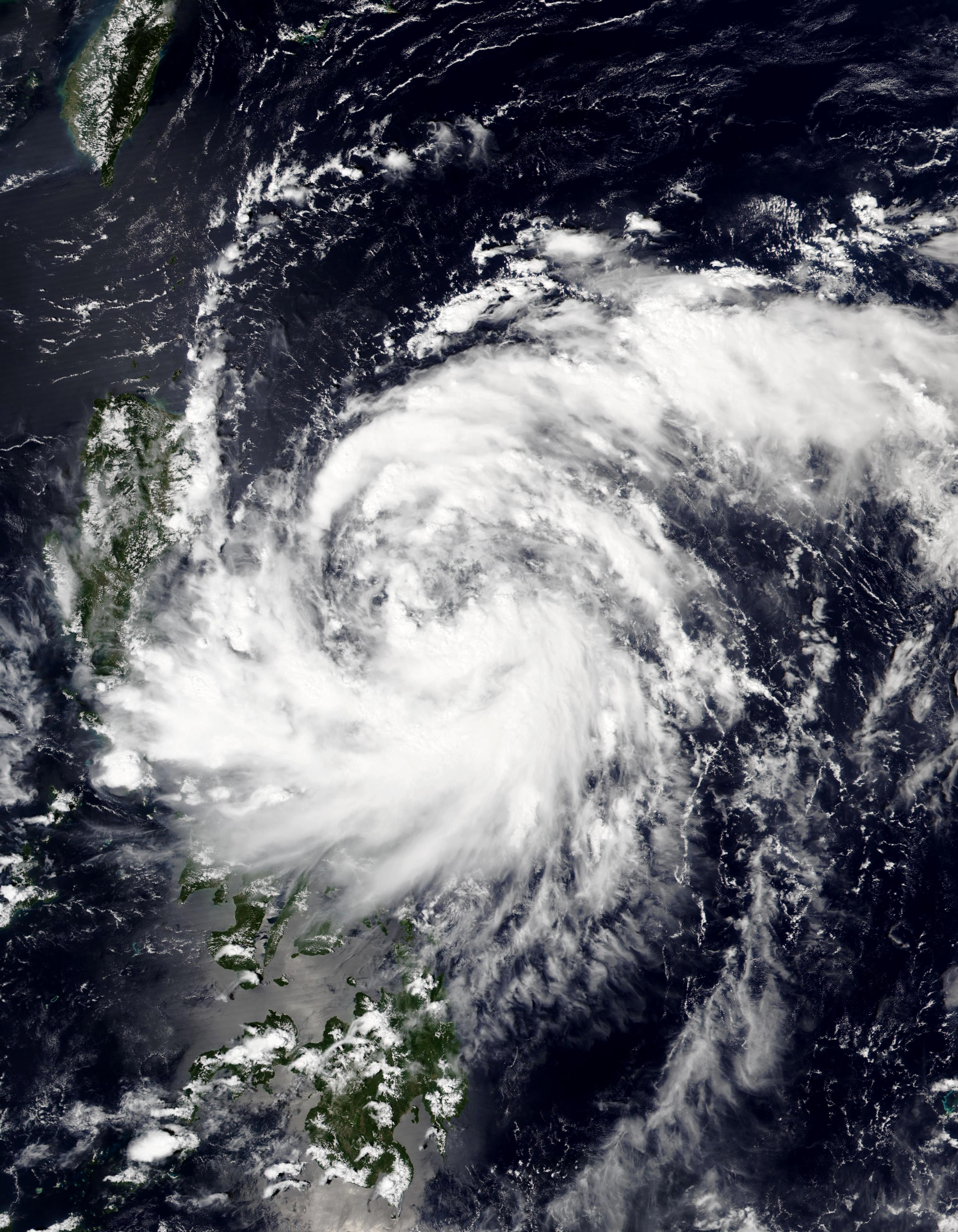
Tropical Storm Matmo approaching Luzon on October 2

At 05:00 PHT on October 1 (21:00 UTC), PAGASA began issuing Tropical Cyclone Wind Signal (TCWS) No. 1 for the entire provinces of Bulacan, Cagayan, Camarines Norte, Catanduanes, Ilocos Norte, Ilocos Sur, Nueva Ecija, Pampanga, Pangasinan, Quezon and Tarlac, and northern Zambales. The PAGASA warned in its bulletin at 11:00 PHT (03:00 UTC) that Paolo, about 450 nautical miles (835 km) east of southeastern Luzon, could bring heavy rain, strong winds, and coastal flooding to parts of Northern and Central Luzon by October 3.

TCWS No. 2 was raised the following day for some portions of Apayao, Cagayan, and Ilocos Sur, as well as the entire provinces of Abra and Kalinga. As Matmo strengthened into a severe tropical storm at 23:00 PHT (15:00 UTC), the agency upgraded several areas to TCWS No. 3, including northern Aurora, Benguet, La Union, central and southern Isabela, Nueva Vizcaya, Quirino, and the entire provinces of Ifugao and Mountain Province. At 11:00 PHT (03:00 UTC) on October 3, the agency raised TCWS No. 4 for extreme northern Aurora, the southern portions of Isabela, Abra, Ilocos Sur, the northern portions of Quirino, Nueva Vizcaya, La Union, and the entire provinces of Mountain Province and Ifugao. The signal was later lowered when the PAGASA downgraded Matmo to a severe tropical storm at 17:00 PHT on October 3 and lifted altogether the next day.

Apart from wind signals, the PAGASA issued a heavy rainfall advisory at 11:00 PHT on October 3, placing Bataan and Zambales under an Orange Rainfall Warning, indicating that flooding was threatening and residents should prepare to evacuate if necessary. A Yellow Rainfall Warning was also issued for Batangas, Cavite, and several towns in Quezon, signalling the possibility of flooding in flood-prone areas. A storm surge warning was also in effect over parts of Luzon. Classes were suspended in Isabela, Cagayan, Quirino and Nueva Vizcaya on October 3.

=== Hong Kong ===
The HKO began tracking the low-pressure area as early as September 29, upgrading it to a tropical depression by 23:00 HKT (15:00 UTC) on October 1. At 17:20 HKT (09:20 UTC) on October 3, the HKO announced that Standby Signal No. 1 would be issued at 19:40 HKT. The signal was issued as scheduled, setting a new record that the tropical cyclone warning signal was issued for the twelfth storm in a season, surpassing the 1974 record of eleven storms. At 12:20 HKT (04:20 UTC) on October 4, Strong Wind Signal No. 3 was issued, following an earlier announcement made at 09:40 HKT (01:40 UTC). Later that day, at 17:45 HKT (09:45 UTC), the HKO upgraded Matmo to typhoon status. The next day at 15:40 HKT, Strong Wind Signal No. 3 was lowered to Standby Signal No. 1. Signal No. 1 was subsequently cancelled at 22:20 HKT (14:20 UTC).

=== Macau ===
The Meteorological and Geophysical Bureau (Note: Portuguese: Direcção dos Serviços Meteorológicos e Geofísicos) (SMG) issued the Signal No. 1‌ at 23:00 MST (15:00 UTC) on October 3. The 1974 record on the number of storms which required the issuance of warning signals was tied. The signal was raised to Signal No. 3 at 16:00 MST (08:00 UTC) on October 4. A blue storm surge warning was also issued, at 12:00 MST. At 20:00 MST (12:00 UTC), the SMG upgraded Matmo to a typhoon. They also announced at 23:00 MST (15:00 UTC) that Gale or Storm Southeast Signal No. 8 would be hoisted between 02:00 to 04:00 MST on October 5. The signal was hoisted at 02:00 MST and lowered to Signal No. 3 at 13:00 MST; whereas the storm surge signal was cancelled at 11:00 MST. The state of prevention as declared also ended at 13:00 MST as Signal No. 8 was lowered. When Signal No. 8 was hoisted, ferry services with Hong Kong and traffic on the Hong Kong–Macau–Zhuhai Bridge were suspended. All typhoon signals were cancelled by 21:00 MST (13:00 UTC).

=== China ===
Around 347,000 people were evacuated in Hainan and Guangdong: 150,000 in Guangdong; another 197,000 in Hainan.

=== Vietnam ===
In anticipation of Matmo's developments, the Haiphong City Civil Defense Command issued a directive on October 2 to local Civil Defense Commands and related agencies to closely monitor official warnings, forecasts, and the storm's progress. Vessel captains and owners were instructed to stay informed of the storm's current position, projected track, and changing characteristics, taking precautionary measures and adjusting operations to ensure safety. Response forces and rescue equipment were placed on standby for emergency deployment. The US embassy in Hanoi issued an alert regarding Matmo. In Ho Chi Minh City, in southern Vietnam, the local department of agriculture and environment instructed local authorities and relevant agencies to closely monitor bulletins and forecasts of the storm's developments, prevent and respond to the storm's impact including heavy rain, thunderstorms, strong winds and flooding.

== Impact ==
=== Philippines ===
Flooding was reported in several parts of Luzon as Matmo brought heavy rain on October 3. A total of 21,340 people were evacuated in the province of Aurora. A power transmission line between Santiago and Alicia was downed, affecting customers of ISELCO I in Isabela and IFELCO in Ifugao. Flash flooding was also reported in Batangas, resulting in the evacuation of hundreds of families. About 55 families were evacuated in Ifugao after the gates of Magat Dam were opened. A house was swept away by floodwaters in Santa Fe, Nueva Vizcaya. The NDRRMC said that 313,822 were affected by the storm, while 8,380 others were displaced. One house was destroyed while 26 others were damaged. Six infrastructures were damaged, with up to 111 road sections and 36 bridges rendered impassable. Power outages occurred in 61 areas, while 17 seaports were shut down, resulting in at least 176 passengers and 39 vessels stranded. One person drowned after attempting to cross a swollen river in Cordon, Isabela. NDRRMC reported ₱111 million (US$1.89 million) worth of damages from Matmo.

=== Hong Kong ===
According to the Airport Authority, 27 flights were anticipated to be cancelled as of 08:30 HKT on October 5, and 81 were expected to be delayed. The Ngong Ping 360 cable car system was suspended from service.

Although the typhoon did not directly hit Hong Kong, its outer rainbands brought heavy rains and strong to gale-force winds to the territory. Winds recorded on Cheung Chau Beach reached 10-minute sustained winds of 82 km/h (51 mph). The highest wind warning issued in Hong Kong was Strong Wind Signal No. 3, which remained in force for 24 hours.

=== Macau ===
Minor flooding as a result of storm surge was reported in low-lying areas along Porto Interior in the morning on October 5.

=== China ===
Matmo made landfall during a week-long holiday (known as a "Golden Week") following China's National Day. The city of Zhanjiang, Guangdong imposed a shutdown on schools, businesses, transport and public services in the evening on October 4. From the morning of October 5, all highways were closed. Damage in Zhanjiang was estimated at 11.11 billion yuan (US$1.56 billion).

In Haikou and Wenchang, Hainan, schools, workplaces, ferry routes and scenic spots were closed. All trains on the island province were suspended on October 5. All flights to and from the Haikou Meilan International Airport were cancelled from the evening on October 4.

On October 5, at Bohe Port in Dianbai District, Maoming, Guangdong Province, strong winds brought by Matmo tore off an iron roof, causing it to fall to the ground. Water level in Zuojiang River exceeded the warning level by 4.89 metres (16 ft 1 in), causing flooding in Longzhou. Total damage in China reached CN¥15.02 billion (US$2.33 billion).

=== Vietnam ===
Costliest tropical cyclones in Vietnam
Rank	Storm	Season	Damage		Ref.
Rank	Storm	Season	VND	USD	Ref.
1	Yagi	2024	84.5 trillion	$3.47 billion	
2	Bualoi	2025	23.9 trillion	$950 million	
3	Damrey	2017	22.7 trillion	$1 billion	
4	Matmo	2025	21 trillion	$837 million	
5	Doksuri	2017	18.4 trillion	$809 million	
6	Ketsana	2009	16.1 trillion	$896 million	
7	Wutip	2013	13.6 trillion	$648 million	
8	Molave	2020	13.3 trillion	$573 million	
9	TD 23W	2017	13.1 trillion	$579 million	
10	Kalmaegi	2025	13.1 trillion	$521 million	

Matmo unleashed heavy rains, causing devastating flooding in many provinces and cities in northern Vietnam, including the capital Hanoi. Heavy floods were reported in Thái Nguyên, Lạng Sơn, Sơn La, Cao Bằng, Bắc Ninh and Bắc Giang. On October 9, flood levels in Cầu River exceeded the historical level of 2024 during Typhoon Yagi. Flood levels in Bằng River in Cao Bằng also exceeded the historical level of 1989. In Lạng Sơn province, the That Khe 1 hydropower dam burst, flooding the town of Thất Khê. In Bắc Giang, dykes of the Thương River were breached in the communes of Tiên Lục, Bố Hạ, Yên Thế and Việt Yên. On October 9, the communes of Đa Phúc and Trung Giã of Hanoi were flooded due to overflowed dykes. Rainfall rates in Thái Nguyên reached 300-400 mm, with some locations exceeding 560 mm. A damaging tornado touchdown in Hải Phòng, specifically at Chu Văn An ward, causing damage to many homes.

As of October 10, Matmo killed 16, injured 10 and left two others missing, most of them were either swept away by floods or killed by landslides. As of November 25, losses across the nation amounted to 21.01 trillion đồng (US$836.5 million). Thái Nguyên province was the hardest hit province with a loss of 12.6 trillion đồng (US$501.1 million).

=== Thailand ===
By October 7, the remnants of Matmo exacerbated heavy rainfall in Thailand. Flooding in the country killed 22 people and affected 370,000 others across 19 provinces, particularly in Uttaradit and Phra Nakhon Si Ayutthaya.

== Retirement ==
Due to extensive damage and high economic losses it caused in Vietnam, the ESCAP/WMO Typhoon Committee announced that the name Matmo, along with seven others, would be retired from the naming lists for the Western Pacific during the 58th Session in March 2026. Its replacement name will be announced in 2027.

== See also ==
- Weather of 2025
- Tropical cyclones in 2025
- Typhoon Ketsana (Ondoy; 2009) – a very large and deadly typhoon that caused flooding in Metro Manila causing the swelling of the Marikina River 16 years prior.
- Typhoon Parma (Pepeng; 2009) – a stronger and deadlier typhoon that affected the Philippines with the same Philippine name, which had a similar trajectory in September 2009.
- Typhoon Nesat (Pedring; 2011) – a costly typhoon that caused severe devastation over Luzon, including Metro Manila.
- Typhoon Rammasun (Glenda; 2014) – a strong typhoon which also affected the Philippines and shortly crossed central and southern Luzon, causing widespread destruction.
- Typhoon Kalmaegi (Luis; 2014) - a typhoon that took a similar track in the South China Sea; also made landfall on Luzon
- Typhoon Mujigae (Kabayan; 2015) – a stronger typhoon that took a similar track at a similar time of year 10 years before.
- Typhoon Yutu (Rosita; 2018) – an powerful typhoon that impacted in the Philippines and had a similar track to Matmo.
- Typhoon Vamco (Ulysses; 2020) – a stronger and deadlier typhoon that affected rainfall at the same area five years ago.
