= List of storms named Damrey =

The name Damrey (Khmer: ដំរី, [ɗɑm.ˈrəj]) has been used for five tropical cyclones in the northwestern Pacific Ocean. The name was contributed by Cambodia and means elephant in Khmer.

Cumulative track map

- Typhoon Damrey (2000) (T0001, 01W, Asiang) – a Category 5-equivalent typhoon that remained out to sea; the first name used from the WMO.
- Typhoon Damrey (2005) (T0518, 17W, Labuyo) – the most powerful storm to affect Hainan in over 30 years.
- Typhoon Damrey (2012) (T1210, 11W) – the strongest storm to affect the area north of the Yangtze River since 1949.
- Typhoon Damrey (2017) (T1723, 28W, Ramil) – a Category 2 typhoon that made landfall in Vietnam, becoming the second-costliest storm on record to affect the country.
- Severe Tropical Storm Damrey (2023) (T2310, 08W) – skirted the eastern coast of Japan.

| Preceded by Saobien | Pacific typhoon season names Damrey | Succeeded by Tianma |
