= Typhoon Doksuri (2017) =

Pacific typhoon in 2017

Typhoon Doksuri (Maring)
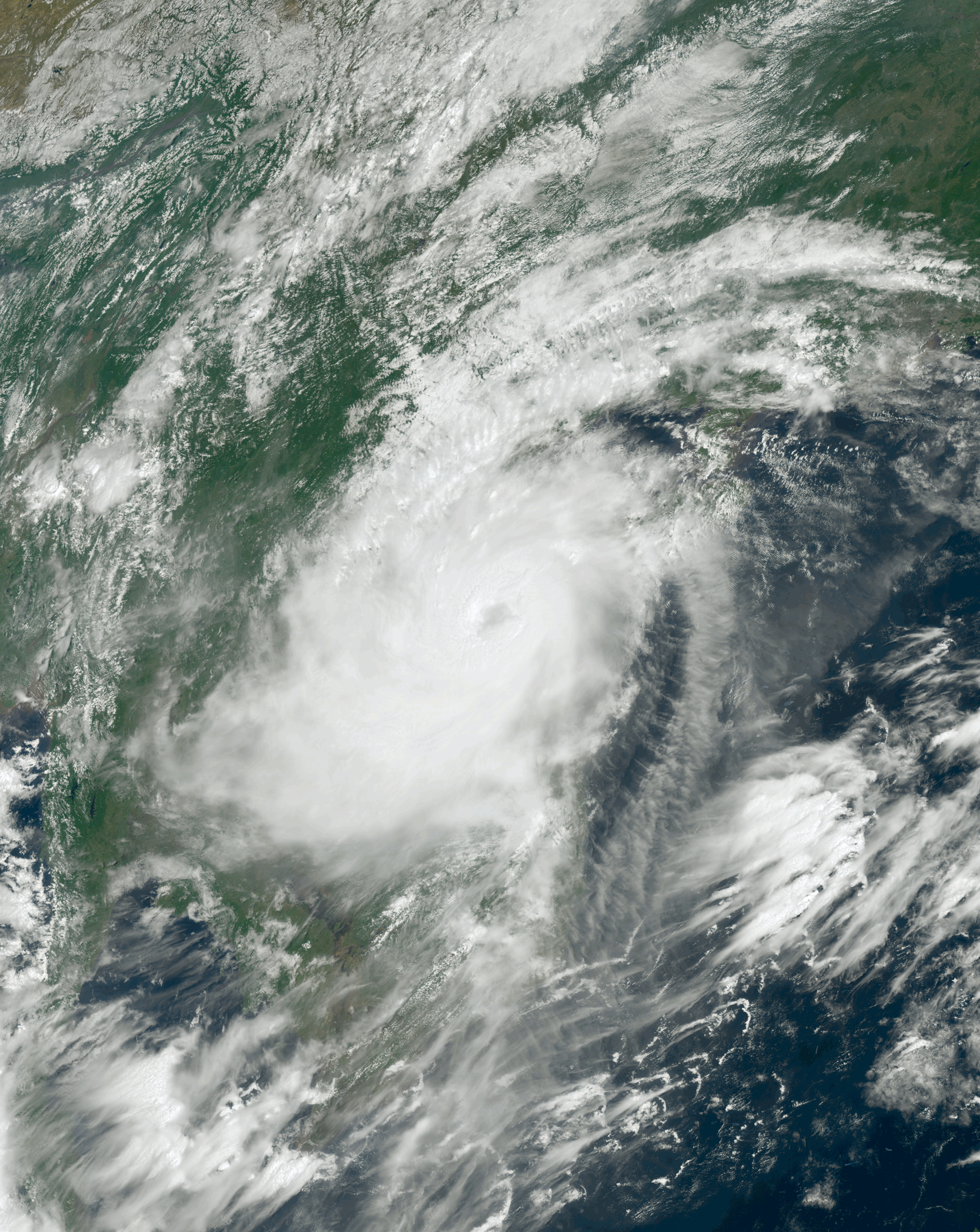
- Doksuri approaching Vietnam near peak intensity early on September 15

Meteorological history
- Formed: September 10, 2017
- Dissipated: September 16, 2017

Typhoon
- 10-minute sustained (JMA)
- Highest winds: 150 km/h (90 mph)
- Lowest pressure: 955 hPa (mbar); 28.20 inHg

Category 2-equivalent typhoon
- 1-minute sustained (SSHWS/JTWC)
- Highest winds: 175 km/h (110 mph)
- Lowest pressure: 960 hPa (mbar); 28.35 inHg

Overall effects
- Fatalities: 29 total
- Damage: $836 million (2017 USD)
- Areas affected: Philippines, South China, Vietnam, Laos, Cambodia, Thailand, Myanmar, Bangladesh, Malay Peninsula
- IBTrACS
- Part of the 2017 Pacific typhoon season

Typhoon Doksuri, (Note: The name Doksuri (Korean: 독수리, [to̞ks͈uɾi]) was contributed by South Korea and means eagle or refers to the Eurasian black vulture (Aegypius monachus) in Korean.) known in the Philippines as Tropical Storm Maring, was a strong Category 2 typhoon that mostly impacted the Philippines and Indochina during mid-September 2017. Forming as the nineteenth named storm of the season, Doksuri developed as a weak tropical depression over to the east of Visayas on September 10.

== Meteorological history ==
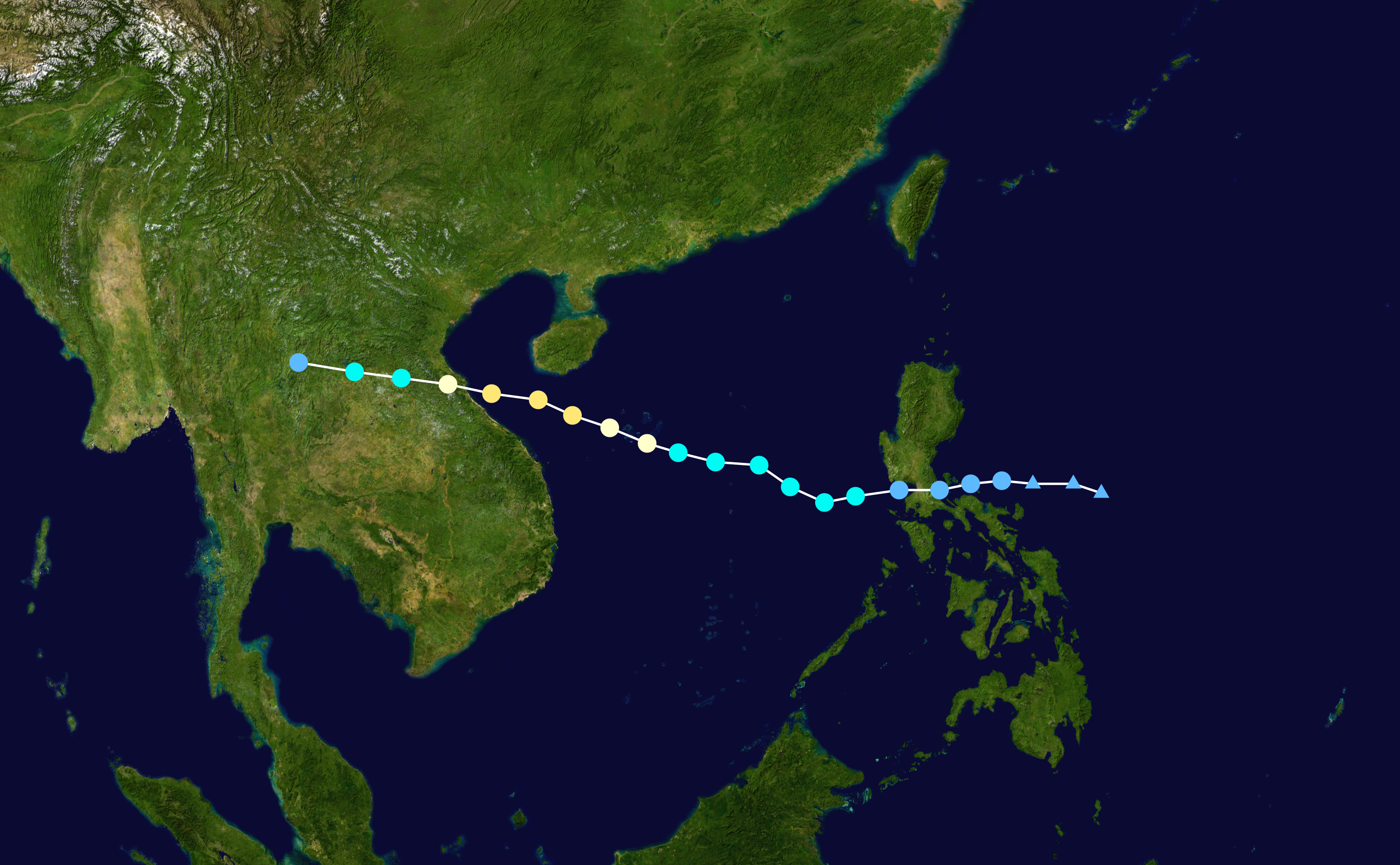
Map plotting the storm's track and intensity, according to the Saffir–Simpson scale Map key Saffir–Simpson scale Tropical depression (≤38 mph, ≤62 km/h) Tropical storm (39–73 mph, 63–118 km/h) Category 1 (74–95 mph, 119–153 km/h) Category 2 (96–110 mph, 154–177 km/h) Category 3 (111–129 mph, 178–208 km/h) Category 4 (130–156 mph, 209–251 km/h) Category 5 (≥157 mph, ≥252 km/h) Unknown Storm type Tropical cyclone Subtropical cyclone Extratropical cyclone, remnant low, tropical disturbance, or monsoon depression

During September 9, the Joint Typhoon Warning Center (JTWC) began monitoring on a tropical disturbance that had developed about 836 km (519 mi) west-northwest of the province of Eastern Samar. During the next day, the Japan Meteorological Agency (JMA) classified the system as a weak tropical depression. Six hours later, the JMA started to issue advisories on the depression when it had winds of 55 km/h (34 mph). On 21:00 UTC of September 11, the JTWC followed suit, giving the designation of 21W. The JMA upgraded 21W to a tropical storm during September 12, giving the name Doksuri, the nineteenth named storm of the annual typhoon season. By September 13, robust convection had persisted near its low-level circulation center (LLCC) along with deep convective banding and a depicted "ragged" microwave eye feature. This prompted the JTWC to classify Doksuri as a tropical storm. About six hours later, Doksuri's LLCC became well-defined, and Doksuri strengthened into a severe tropical storm from the JMA.

By September 14, strong convection was found to the south of its LLCC as convective banding began to wrap into a nascent eye. Doksuri strengthened into a Category 1-equivalent typhoon. Around this time, Doksuri was already located in an area of low vertical wind shear along with warm sea-surface temperatures of about 30–31 °C (86–88 °F). The JMA followed suit on upgrading Doksuri to a typhoon on 12:00 UTC of the same day. With a slowly-developing eye with constant convection around its LLCC, Doksuri strengthened into a Category 2-equivalent typhoon.

The lowest sea-level pressure recorded in Ba Đồn (Quảng Bình) during the typhoon's impact was 966.6 hPa (28.54 inHg) at 11:15 ICT on September 15.

== Preparations and impact ==
Deaths and damage from Typhoon Doksuri
Countries	Fatalities		Damage (2017 USD)	Ref
Countries	Death	Injured	Damage (2017 USD)	
Philippines	22	15	$5.24 million	
Vietnam	6	152	$809 million	
Mainland China	0	0	$15.3 million	
Laos	1	0	$6.68 million	
Totals:	29	177	$836 million	

=== Philippines ===
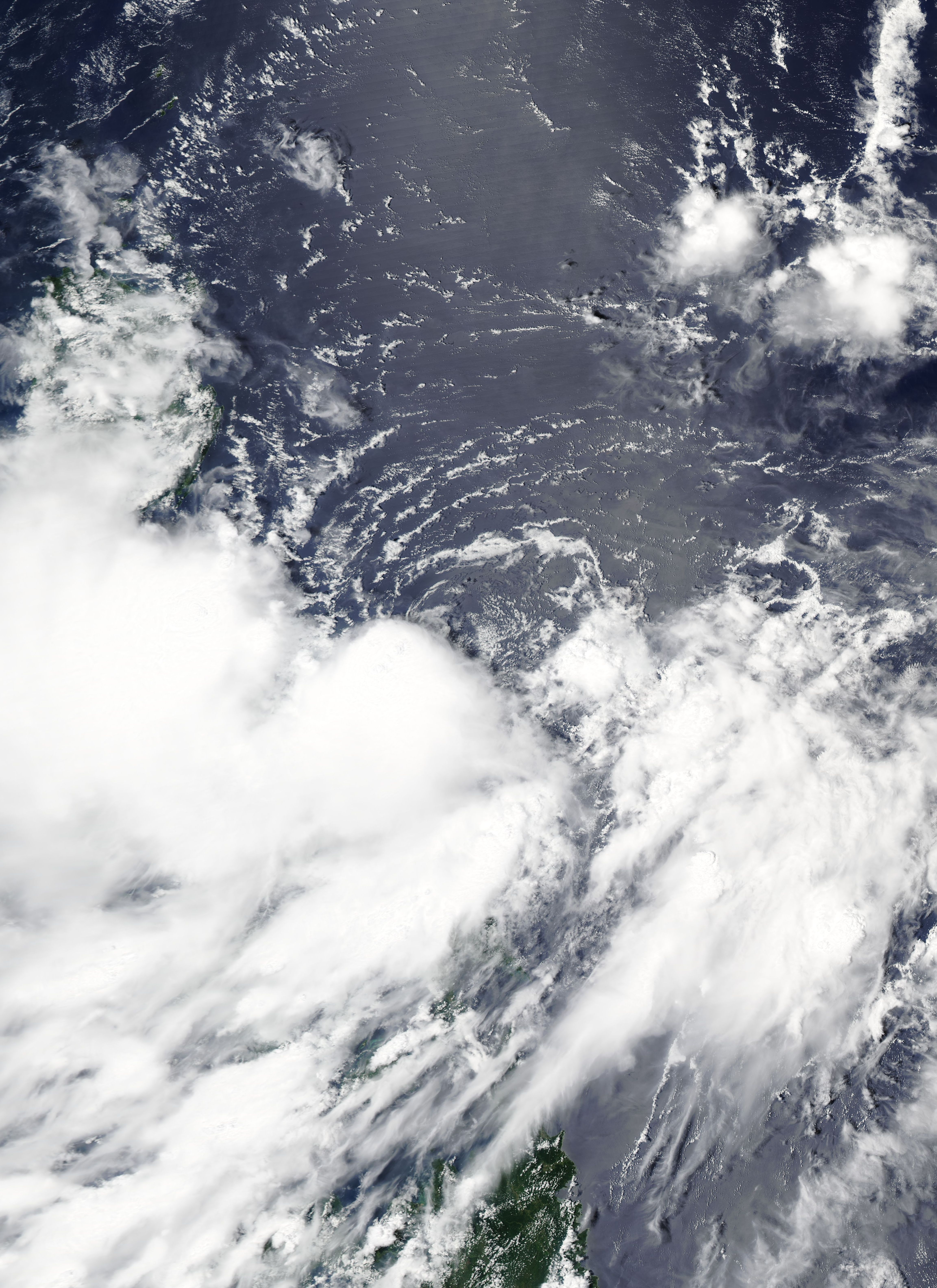
Tropical Depression Maring over Luzon on September 11

Doksuri, which is known as Maring, affected the Philippine archipelago of Luzon as a tropical storm. Shortly after when PAGASA began monitoring on the system, they already raised a Storm Signal Warning #1 over in the Southern Luzon portion, including provinces of Camarines Sur and Aurora on September 11. Hours later, Signal Warning #1 was expanded to as west as Metro Manila, as north as Pangasinan and La Union, while every province in Central Luzon (Region III) was in that area. Moreover, local government units declared class suspensions to many places, especially in the capital region and the province of Bulacan for Tuesday, September 12. Domestics flights were already canceled from Ninoy Aquino International Airport while bus trips were canceled in the Quezon-Aurora area. After the storm, on September 13, officials in the Cordillera Administrative Region (CAR) had warned residents to refrain from doing outdoor activities over in mountainous areas, especially in Benguet, for possibilities of landslides.

Laguna was one of the provinces that got hit hard by the storm as the city was placed under a state of calamity after it had "too much rainfall" that produced further flash floods and landslides. Malacañang had provided ₱650 million (US$12.8 million) worth of relief goods and funds for victims while the Department of Health (DoH) had offered ₱20 million (US$393,000) of supplies for provinces from Cagayan Valley (Region II) down to Bicol (Region V). Over in the Quezon province, three buses and a car were stranded in flooded streets and the 25 passengers in one bus were rescued later that day. Quezon officials deployed rescue boats and military trucks the rescue efforts while the Philippine Army's 2nd Infantry Division has deployed a rescue team in Calabarzon. About 1,857 families or 7,549 people were staying in 116 evacuation centers over in Laguna and Quezon. At least 2,103 families or 8,794 persons were affected in 109 barangays in the regions of Central Luzon, Metro Manila and the Calabarzon. The Department of Social Welfare and Development (DSWD) allocated a total of ₱577.8 million (US$11.3 million) as standby funds for affected families while 18,000 food packs were prepositioned.

According to the NDRRMC, a total of 22 people were dead with 4 missing, while damage nationwide were at ₱267 million (US$5.24 million).

=== Vietnam ===
List of Vietnamese weather stations that recorded sustained wind speeds of Force 8 (62 km/h) or higher on the Beaufort scale
Province or Municipality	Station	Maximum sustained wind speeds	Peak gusts
Hải Phòng	Bạch Long Vĩ Island	76 km/h	94 km/h
Nghệ An	Cửa Hội	68 km/h	90 km/h
Nghệ An	Hòn Ngư Island	86 km/h	108 km/h
Hà Tĩnh	Cẩm Nhượng	90 km/h	126 km/h
Hà Tĩnh	Hoành Sơn	115 km/h	151 km/h
Hà Tĩnh	Kỳ Anh	115 km/h	144 km/h
Quảng Bình	Ba Đồn	72 km/h	115 km/h
Quảng Bình	Đồng Hới	68 km/h	119 km/h
Quảng Trị	Cồn Cỏ Island	115 km/h	155 km/h
Quảng Trị	Cửa Việt	79 km/h	97 km/h
Quảng Trị	Tân Mỹ	90 km/h	133 km/h

Costliest tropical cyclones in Vietnam
Rank	Storm	Season	Damage		Ref.
Rank	Storm	Season	VND	USD	Ref.
1	Yagi	2024	84.5 trillion	$3.47 billion	
2	Bualoi	2025	23.9 trillion	$950 million	
3	Damrey	2017	22.7 trillion	$1 billion	
4	Matmo	2025	21 trillion	$837 million	
5	Doksuri	2017	18.4 trillion	$809 million	
6	Ketsana	2009	16.1 trillion	$896 million	
7	Wutip	2013	13.6 trillion	$648 million	
8	Molave	2020	13.3 trillion	$573 million	
9	TD 23W	2017	13.1 trillion	$579 million	
10	Kalmaegi	2025	13.1 trillion	$521 million	

Typhoon Doksuri was the tenth storm to affect Vietnam and was considered as the "most powerful storm in a decade" to impact the nation. As early as September 13, authorities over the northern and central provinces banned people from going to sea. Vietnam was placed under a red warning, which stands for "very high" risks. Waves as high as 32 ft (9.8 m) were predicted offshore. Coastal provinces, therefore, announced plans to shut down beaches and ban fishing by September 14. The Red Cross Society has sent missions to Ha Tinh and Quang Binh and mobilized forces to support people in storm-hit areas during September 15. About 1,500 villagers were evacuated over in the Thua Thien-Hue province due to water erosion. In Vietnam's capital city of Hanoi, 33 flights were canceled, while Vietnam Railways canceled seven passenger trains and five cargo trains in the Ha Tinh and Quang Binh provinces. About 80,000 people have evacuated over in Central Vietnam.

On the mainland of Vietnam, at the meteorological stations in Hoành Sơn and Kỳ Anh (Hà Tĩnh), sustained wind speeds of 115 km/h (72 mph) were recorded, and wind gusts at the Hoành Sơn station were recorded in the range of 151–155 km/h (94–96 mph). The strong winds caused by the typhoon led to power outages, affecting 1.5 million people. The provinces of Thanh Hóa up to Quang Ngai saw total precipitation of 100–200 mm (3.9–7.9 in), with some reports of high as 300 mm (12 in). Water erosion affected 700 meters of sea dike in a village in Thuan An. Seven fishing vessels and 183 small boats sank while 10 small irrigation dams were damaged. 220 small boats were washed away over in the provinces of Nam Dinh and Quang Ngai. In agriculture, Doksuri affected 4,473 hectares of rice with an additional 8,277 hectares for other crops, as well as 16,108 hectares of aquaculture. Overall, 13,000 hectares of perennial crops were damaged, mostly over in the Quang Binh and Quang Tri provinces. The storm also damaged a total of 10 km of highways and 17.9 km of local roads. A total of 23,968 houses had damaged roofs, especially from the Ha Tinh province. During September 16, Vietnam Electricity resumed power only to seriously affected areas such as Dong Hoi, Quang Binh and Nghe An. On September 17, the Vietnam Red Cross (VRC) offered aid of about ₫1.5 billion (US$66,000) to six provinces that were hit by the typhoon. Moreover, the Coca-Cola company of Vietnam sent 24,000 water bottles to residents of in the Quang Binh province. Around the same time, 31,000 soldiers and police were mobilized to help residents in hard-hit provinces. By September 19, a total of 1.3 million households had been supplied with electricity again. On the same day, the FLC Group provide a relief of ₫9 billion (US$396,000) to Nghe An, Ha Tinh and Quang Binh for the recovery of Doksuri.

In all, 12 people were reported to be dead during the typhoon, along with 215 injury and 4 missing. Total damages from the typhoon reached ₫18.4 trillion (US$809 million). Quang Binh and Ha Tinh were the worst hit provinces, which lost a total of ₫13.86 trillion (US$610 million). Vietnam Electricity suffered a loss of ₫215 billion (US$9.46 million), while damage on the health sector reached ₫50 billion (US$2.2 million).

=== Other areas ===
Despite making landfall in Indochina, Doksuri affected Hainan and total economic losses were estimated to be CNY100 million (US$15.3 million). Flooding triggered by the storm in Laos killed one person and total damage reached ₭55.5 billion (US$6.68 million).

== See also ==
- Weather of 2017
- Tropical cyclones in 2017
- Typhoon Dan (1989)
- Tropical Depression Winnie (2004)
- Typhoon Ketsana (2009)
- Typhoon Wutip (2013)
- Typhoon Kajiki (2025)
