= Typhoon Damrey (2017) =

Pacific typhoon in 2017

Typhoon Damrey (Ramil)
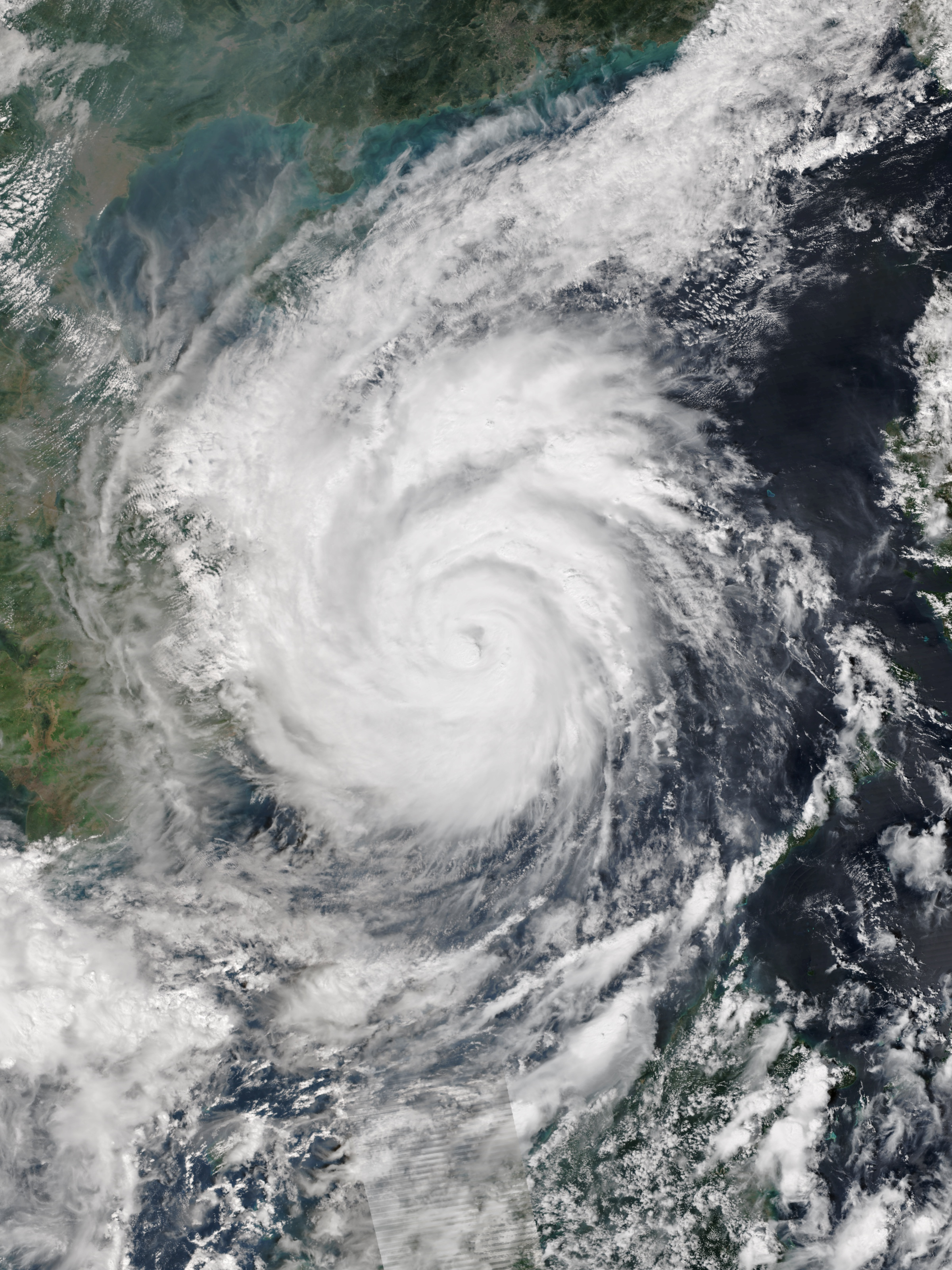
- Typhoon Damrey approaching Vietnam on November 3

Meteorological history
- Formed: October 31, 2017
- Dissipated: November 4, 2017

Typhoon
- 10-minute sustained (JMA)
- Highest winds: 130 km/h (80 mph)
- Lowest pressure: 970 hPa (mbar); 28.64 inHg

Category 2-equivalent typhoon
- 1-minute sustained (SSHWS/JTWC)
- Highest winds: 165 km/h (105 mph)
- Lowest pressure: 967 hPa (mbar); 28.56 inHg

Overall effects
- Fatalities: 142 total
- Damage: $1 billion (2017 USD) (Third-costliest in Vietnamese history)
- Areas affected: Philippines, Vietnam, Cambodia, Thailand
- IBTrACS
- Part of the 2017 Pacific typhoon season

Typhoon Damrey, known in the Philippines as Severe Tropical Storm Ramil, was a strong tropical cyclone that affected the Philippines and Vietnam during early November 2017. Damrey first originated as a tropical depression over the Philippine archipelago of Visayas on October 31. Emerging into the South China Sea a few days later, the system strengthened into the second deadliest and twenty-third named storm of the 2017 Pacific typhoon season. Rapidly intensifying, Damrey became the season's tenth typhoon on November 3, reaching its peak intensity as a Category 2 on the same day. Damrey made landfall over Khánh Hoà, Vietnam on November 4 and began to rapidly weaken, fully dissipating on November 5.

Strong winds, heavy rainfall and severe flooding in Central Vietnam caused by the typhoon killed 142 people and total damage reached over 22 trillion VND (US$1 billion). Damrey made landfall in central Vietnam as the region hosted the 2017 APEC Summit in Da Nang.

== Meteorological history ==
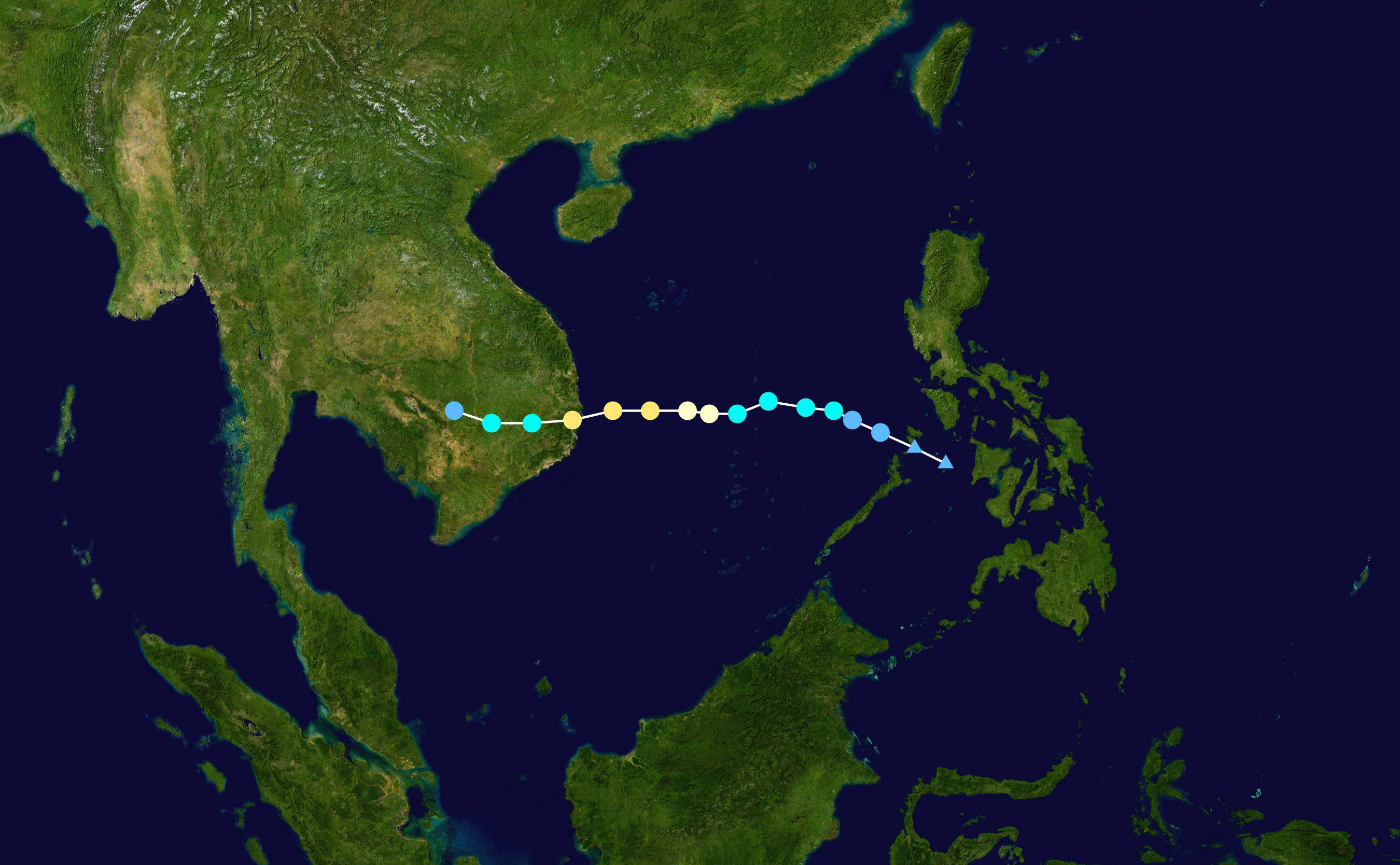
Map plotting the storm's track and intensity, according to the Saffir–Simpson scale Map key Saffir–Simpson scale Tropical depression (≤38 mph, ≤62 km/h) Tropical storm (39–73 mph, 63–118 km/h) Category 1 (74–95 mph, 119–153 km/h) Category 2 (96–110 mph, 154–177 km/h) Category 3 (111–129 mph, 178–208 km/h) Category 4 (130–156 mph, 209–251 km/h) Category 5 (≥157 mph, ≥252 km/h) Unknown Storm type Tropical cyclone Subtropical cyclone Extratropical cyclone, remnant low, tropical disturbance, or monsoon depression

On October 31, the Japan Meteorological Agency (JMA) began monitoring a weak tropical depression located approximately 349 km (217 mi) to the west of Cebu. Six hours later, the JMA began issuing advisories on the system after winds near its center had reached about 55 km/h (35 mph). By about 21:00 UTC of the same day, the PAGASA had classified the system as a tropical depression, assigning the local name Ramil. Around the same time, the Joint Typhoon Warning Center (JTWC) had issued a Tropical Cyclone Formation Alert on the system.

By November 1, the JTWC had classified Ramil as a tropical depression, giving the international designation of 28W, after convection around its low-level circulation center (LLCC) began to consolidate. Thereafter, on November 2, the JMA upgraded the system to a tropical storm after it left the Philippine Area of Responsibility, receiving the name Damrey, (Note: The name Damrey (Khmer: ដំរី, [ɗɑm.ˈrəj]) was contributed by Cambodia and means elephant in Khmer.) becoming the twenty-third named storm of the season. After the system entered a favorable environment for intensification, including continuous convective organization, the JTWC followed suit on upgrading it to a tropical storm. Satellite imagery later depicted deep convective banding wrapping its LLCC, which caused Damrey to further strengthen. By 18:00 UTC of the same day, Damrey had strengthened into a severe tropical storm on the JMA scale. Shortly thereafter, the structure of the storm had become more symmetric, with much deeper convection and an improved radial outflow. Vertical wind shear was also very low at around 5 knots, which was favorable for intensification.

The JMA upgraded Damrey to a typhoon early on November 3. Three hours later, the JTWC followed suit and classified it as a Category 1-equivalent typhoon, after animated satellite imagery depicted a "strengthening" system and a well-defined circular eye like feature. At this stage, Damrey was located in conditions of low shear and warm sea-surface temperatures of 27–28 °C (81–82 °F) with good outflow. The JMA had already declared that Damrey reached its peak intensity with 10-minute sustained winds of 130 km/h (80 mph) and a minimum barometric pressure of 970 hPa. Six hours later, microwave images showed the eye becoming well-defined and an improved storm structure with a large centralized convective mass occluding to its center. By 21:00 UTC, the JTWC upgraded Damrey to a Category 2-equivalent typhoon, reaching its peak strength with 1-minute sustained winds of 165 km/h (105 mph). The JTWC issued their final advisory on the typhoon on 03:00 UTC on November 4, as it made landfall in Vạn Ninh District, Khánh Hòa Province, Vietnam. While over land, its convective structure began to deteriorate, and three hours later the JMA downgraded Damrey to a severe tropical storm, then to a tropical storm. The JMA issued their final advisory on 12:00 UTC on November 4. The agency continued to track the system as it fully dissipated on 00:00 UTC on November 5.

== Preparations and impact ==
Deaths and damage from Typhoon Damrey
Countries	Casualties		Damage (2017 USD)	Ref
Countries	Dead	Injured	Damage (2017 USD)	
Philippines	8		$20,000	
Vietnam	107	342	$1 billion	
Cambodia	1			
Totals:	116	342	$1 billion	

Costliest tropical cyclones in Vietnam
Rank	Storm	Season	Damage		Ref.
Rank	Storm	Season	VND	USD	Ref.
1	Yagi	2024	84.5 trillion	$3.47 billion	
2	Bualoi	2025	23.9 trillion	$950 million	
3	Damrey	2017	22.7 trillion	$1 billion	
4	Matmo	2025	21 trillion	$837 million	
5	Doksuri	2017	18.4 trillion	$809 million	
6	Ketsana	2009	16.1 trillion	$896 million	
7	Wutip	2013	13.6 trillion	$648 million	
8	Molave	2020	13.3 trillion	$573 million	
9	TD 23W	2017	13.1 trillion	$579 million	
10	Kalmaegi	2025	13.1 trillion	$521 million	

=== Philippines ===
On October 31, the PAGASA had raised a Tropical Cyclone Warning Signal #1, the lowest of five, to a few provinces, mostly over Western Visayas (Region VI) and the island of Palawan. PAGASA had also warned residents of risky sea travel over the areas raised by the signal warning, including northern and eastern seaboards of Luzon. Some domestic flights were canceled and trips to and from the Batangas Port were canceled during November 1. Estimated rainfall around the 200 km radius of the system was classified from moderate to occasionally heavy.

The National Disaster Risk Reduction and Management Council (NDRRMC) stated that 305 people had evacuated in the provinces of Camarines Norte, Camarines Sur and in Mindoro, while some 1,938 people were stranded in ports over in Palawan and Batangas. Eight domestic flights were canceled on November 2 while the PAGASA suspended work and classes that day. 14 landslides were recorded in the province of Camarines Sur, killing one person. Three students also died in Busuanga, Palawan after drowning in a river. One road and four bridges were also affected and not passable in the Cagayan Valley. On November 4, the total number of fatalities rose to 8. Torrential rains caused by the storm resulted in 2.5 ft of deep flooding, damaging agricultural crops. Agricultural damages were totaled to Php1.03 million (US$20,000) over in the city of Aurora Quezon on November 4.

=== Vietnam ===
Due to the impact of Typhoon Damrey, sustained winds of 24 m/s (86 km/h)were recorded in M’Drăk, Đắk Lắk Province. Gusts of force 12 on the Beaufort scale were recorded in some areas of Khánh Hòa province, such as gusts of 33 m/s (118 km/h) in Nha Trang and 34 m/s (122 km/h) in Ninh Hòa. The lowest sea-level pressure value recorded at Nha Trang weather station was 982.1 hPa. During the two-day period of November 4–5, heavy rainfall was recorded across the central provinces, with peak totals reaching 1,036 mm in Quảng Nam province, 969 mm in Thừa Thiên Huế province, and 776 mm in Quảng Ngãi province.

According to the People's Committee of Khánh Hòa Province, the typhoon left 44 people dead, 1 missing, and 229 injured in the province. A total of 2,817 houses were destroyed, while over 16,000 solid homes suffered heavy to very heavy damage. The total economic loss in Khánh Hòa was estimated at over 15.5 trillion đồng (US$696 million), with the agricultural sector suffering 5.4 trillion đồng and the housing sector accounting for 3.7 trillion đồng. Most of the devastation in Khánh Hòa was caused by violent winds. The beach resort of Nha Trang was among the worst hit areas, 30,000 inhabitants and tourists had to be evacuated from the area.

By November 8, at least 106 people had been killed in Vietnam as a result of the typhoon, with 197 others injured and 25 missing. Widespread flooding was reported, with more than 300,000 homes having been destroyed or damaged. UNICEF estimated at least four million people had been directly impacted by the storm and were in need of support. Damage by Damrey in Vietnam was estimated at 22.68 trillion đồng (US$1 billion, 2017 USD).

Typhoon Damrey was referenced in the U.S. President Donald Trump's statement at APEC 2017. The Russian President Vladimir Putin gave US$5 million in relief funds due to the typhoon's severe damage in Vietnam.

== See also ==
- Other tropical cyclones named Damrey
- Weather of 2017
- Tropical cyclones in 2017
- Typhoon Lola (1993)
- Typhoon Lingling (2001)
- Typhoon Mirinae (2009)
- Tropical Storm Podul (2013)
- Tropical Storm Usagi (2018)
- Typhoon Molave (2020)
