= Typhoon Molave =

Pacific typhoon in 2020

Typhoon Molave (Quinta)
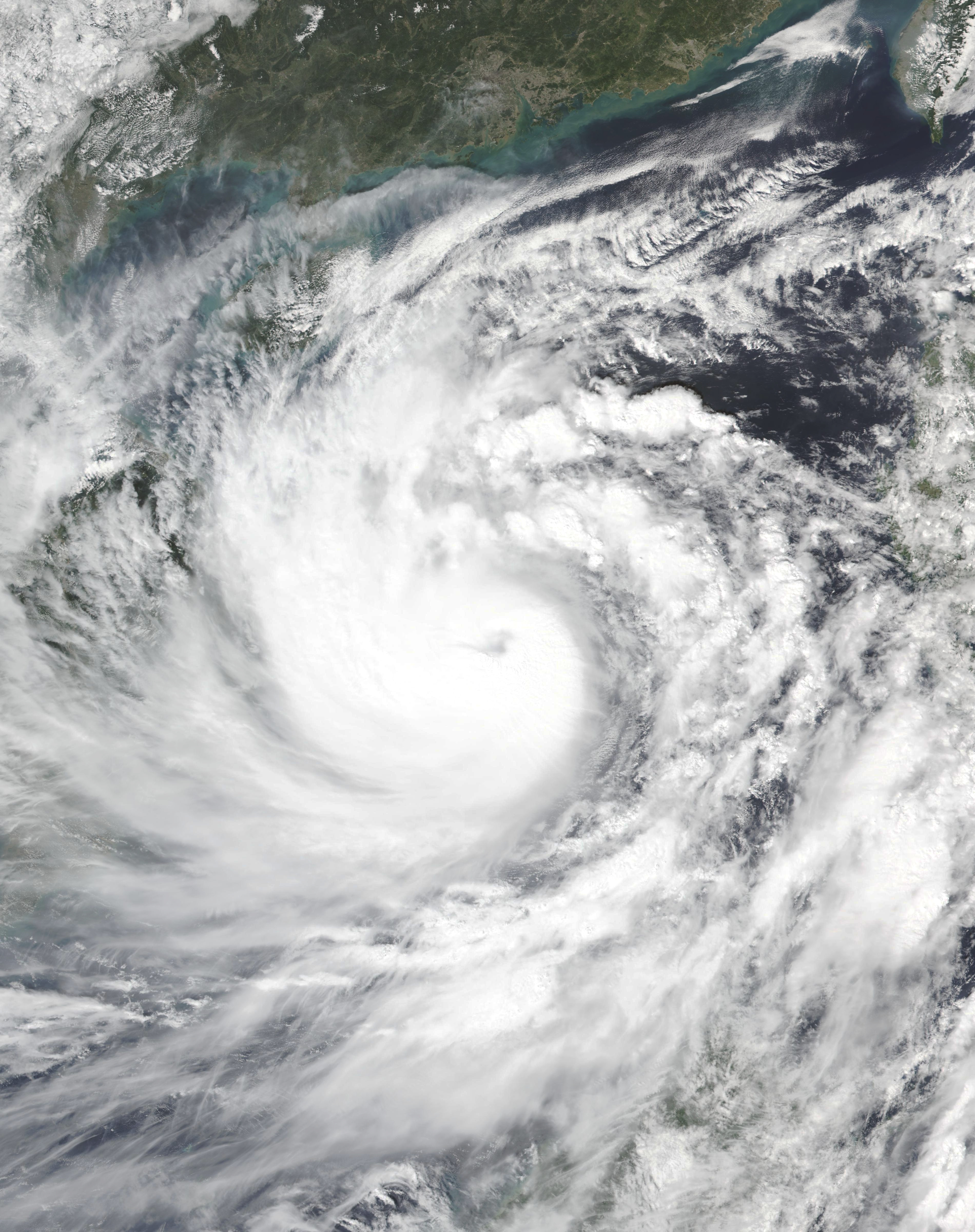
- Typhoon Molave at peak intensity on October 27

Meteorological history
- Formed: October 22, 2020
- Dissipated: October 30, 2020

Very strong typhoon
- 10-minute sustained (JMA)
- Highest winds: 165 km/h (105 mph)
- Lowest pressure: 940 hPa (mbar); 27.76 inHg

Category 3-equivalent typhoon
- 1-minute sustained (SSHWS/JTWC)
- Highest winds: 195 km/h (120 mph)
- Lowest pressure: 952 hPa (mbar); 28.11 inHg

Overall effects
- Fatalities: 71
- Injuries: 186
- Missing: 46
- Damage: $743 million (2020 USD)
- Areas affected: Philippines, Spratly Islands, Vietnam, Laos, Cambodia, Thailand, Malaysia, Myanmar
- IBTrACS
- Part of the 2020 Pacific typhoon season

Typhoon Molave, (Note: The name Molave (Tagalog: molave, [moˈlaː.vɛ]) was contributed by the Philippines and refers to the smallflower chastetree (Vitex parviflora) in Tagalog.) known in the Philippines as Typhoon Quinta, was a powerful and destructive tropical cyclone that caused widespread damage in the Philippines and Indochina in late October 2020, and became the strongest to strike the South Central Coast of Vietnam since Damrey in 2017. The eighteenth named storm and eighth typhoon of the annual typhoon season, Molave originated from a tropical depression that formed on October 23 east of Palau. At 15:00 UTC the next day, the depression was upgraded into Tropical Storm Molave as it drifted generally northwestward. Molave soon became a typhoon on October 25 as it turned west, shortly before making five landfalls in central Philippines. After striking the Philippines, Molave entered the South China Sea and began to re-intensify. Molave attained its peak intensity on October 27 before weakening again as it approached Vietnam. The typhoon struck Vietnam on October 28, before rapidly weakening as it headed further into Indochina. Molave later dissipated on October 30, over Myanmar.

After carving a path of destruction, 71 people have been confirmed dead and another 46 are missing from Molave. Preliminary damage is estimated at $743 million (2020 USD), though the total damage in Indochina is currently unknown.

== Meteorological history ==
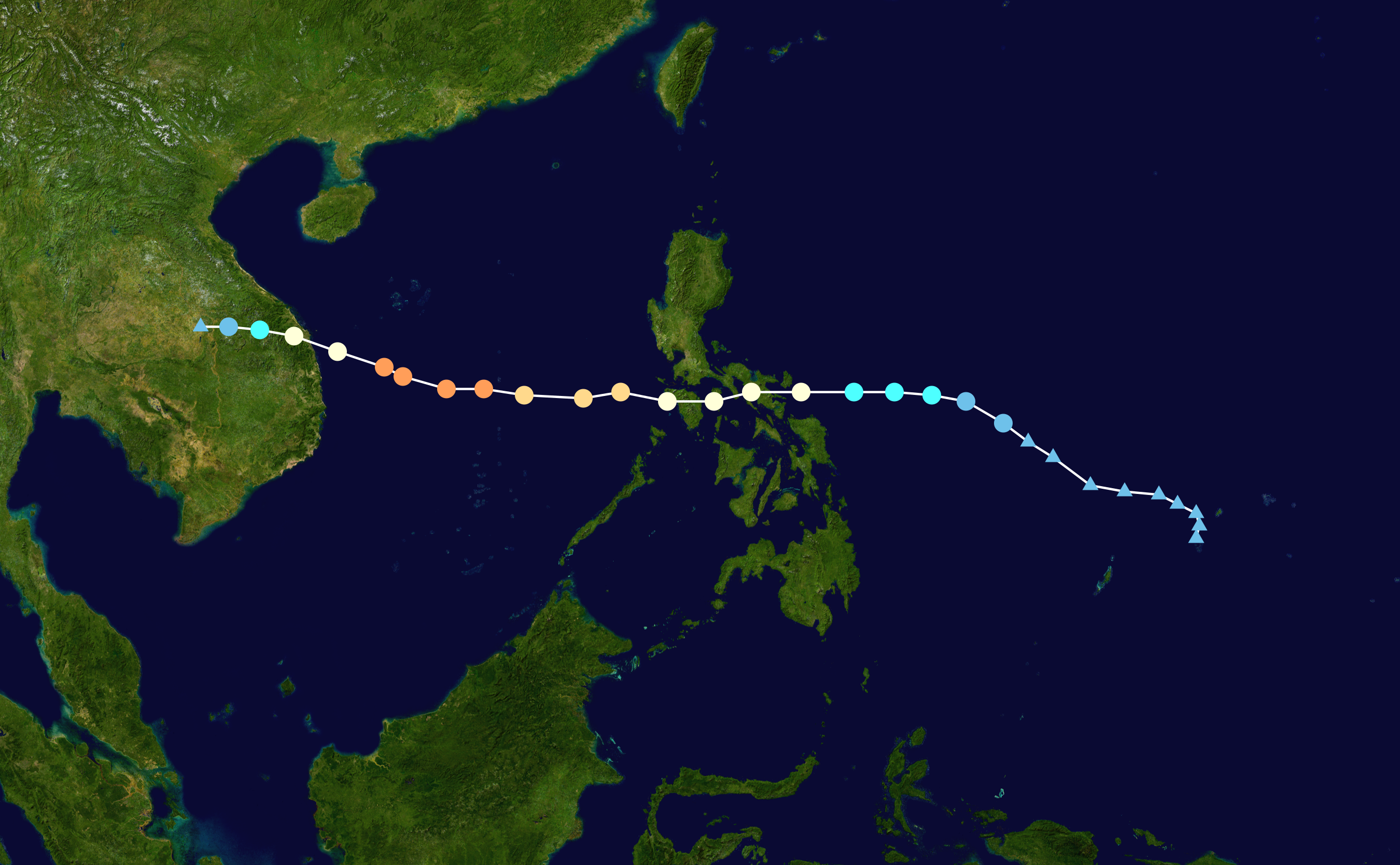
Map plotting the storm's track and intensity, according to the Saffir–Simpson scale Map key Saffir–Simpson scale Tropical depression (≤38 mph, ≤62 km/h) Tropical storm (39–73 mph, 63–118 km/h) Category 1 (74–95 mph, 119–153 km/h) Category 2 (96–110 mph, 154–177 km/h) Category 3 (111–129 mph, 178–208 km/h) Category 4 (130–156 mph, 209–251 km/h) Category 5 (≥157 mph, ≥252 km/h) Unknown Storm type Tropical cyclone Subtropical cyclone Extratropical cyclone, remnant low, tropical disturbance, or monsoon depression

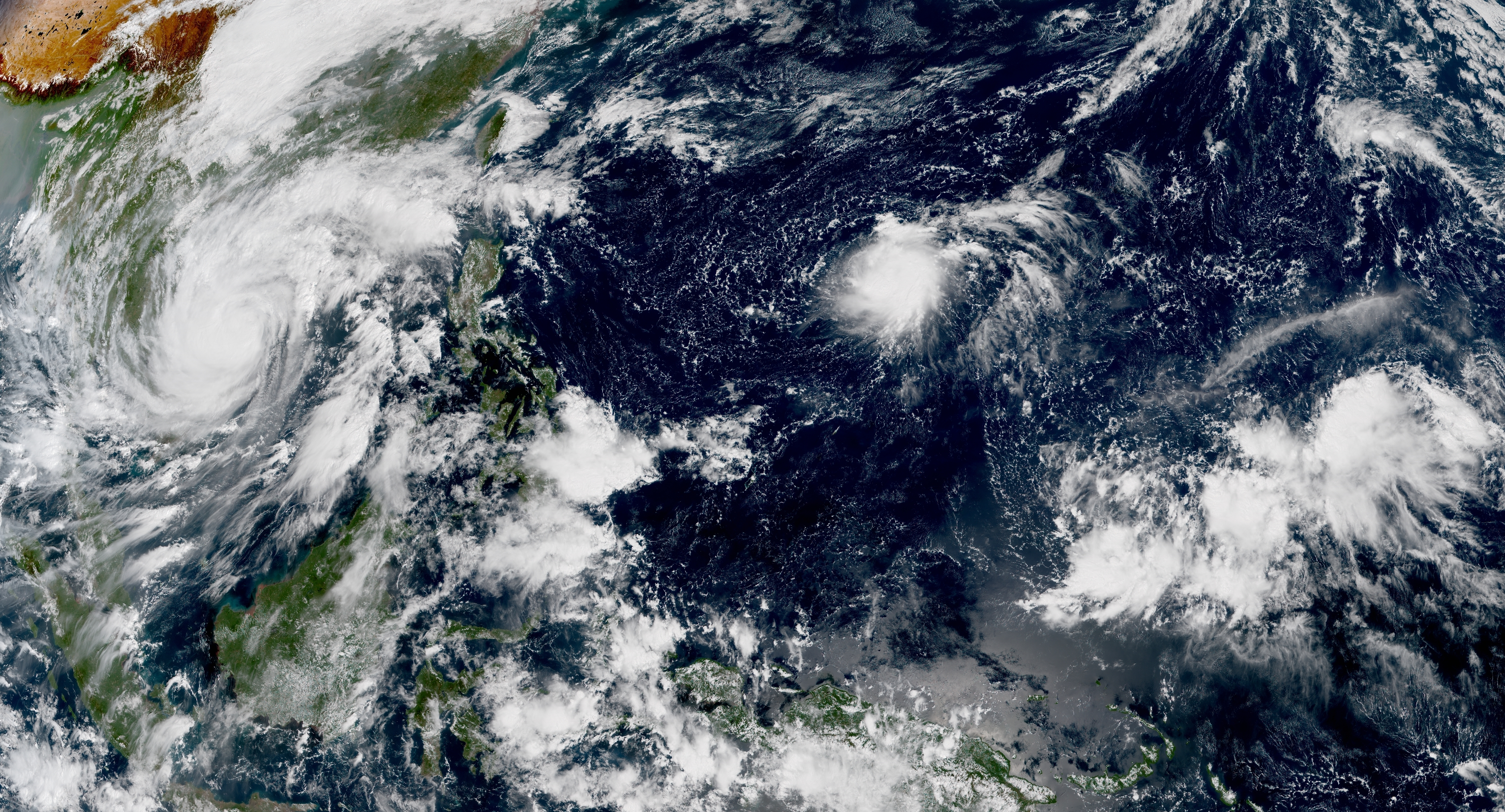
Three tropical cyclones occurred in the western Pacific Ocean simultaneously on October 28. From left to right: Molave, Goni, and a low-pressure area which later became Atsani (at bottom-right).

On October 23, the Japan Meteorological Agency (JMA) began tracking a tropical depression approximately 190 nmi (350 km) north of Palau. On the same day, PAGASA followed suit as the system formed inside of the Philippine Area of Responsibility, east of Mindanao, and named the system Quinta. On the following day, the Joint Typhoon Warning Center (JTWC) also recognized the system as a tropical depression. At 15:00 UTC of the same day, the JTWC upgraded the system into a tropical storm, with the JMA and PAGASA doing the same a few hours apart from each other. Now a tropical storm, the system was named Molave by the JMA. The next day, PAGASA upgraded the system into a severe tropical storm as it approached Bicol. Later that day, the PAGASA then upgraded Molave into a typhoon as it headed for Albay and Camarines Sur, prompting the raising of TCWS#3 for both and adjacent provinces. Shortly afterwards, the JMA also upgraded the system to a typhoon and the JTWC followed a few hours later. At 18:10 PHT (10:10 UTC), Molave made its first landfall on the San Miguel Island in Albay, with another one in Malinao just 40 minutes later. Molave made three more landfalls in San Andres, Quezon at 22:30 PHT (14:30 UTC), Torrijos, Marinduque at 1:20 PHT October 26 (17:20 UTC), and Pola, Oriental Mindoro at 3:30 PHT (19:30 UTC). Molave emerged over the South China Sea on the same day, continuing to gradually intensify as it left the Philippine Area of Responsibility (PAR) and drifted away from the Philippines. The state of Sabah in Malaysia was also affected by the typhoon which was reported to be at 703 kilometers off southwest Kudat, causing rough seas with waves reaching up to 3.5 m (11 ft) in the west coast of Sabah including Labuan. Molave strengthened into a powerful Category 3 typhoon under relatively favorable conditions.

As the system continued westwards, the storm began to slowly weaken as it approached Vietnam. Subsequently, the storm turned slightly to the west-northwest. Molave made landfall on Quảng Ngãi province, central Vietnam at 10:10 UTC+7 (03:10 UTC), October 28 with category 2 typhoon strength. The storm rapidly weakened once inland, with the JTWC issuing their final warning on the system while it still had Typhoon force winds on October 29, as the storm's convection became increasingly disorganized. The JMA continued to track the system as a Tropical Depression over Cambodia until they issued their final advisory on October 30. The storm dissipated shortly afterward, over Myanmar.

== Preparations ==
=== Philippines ===
==== Highest Tropical Cyclone Wind Signal ====
Highest Tropical Cyclone Wind Signal issued by PAGASA for Molave (Quinta) in each province. The white line represents the best track.

TCWS#	Luzon	Visayas	Mindanao
3	Albay, Batangas, Burias Island, Camarines Norte, Camarines Sur, Catanduanes, Southern Portion of Laguna, Marinduque, Northern and Central Portion of Occidental Mindoro incl. Lubang Island, Northern and Central Portion of Oriental Mindoro, Southern Portion of Quezon, Northern Portion of Romblon, Ticao Island	None	None
2	Bataan, Southern Portion of Bulacan, Cavite, Calamian Group of Islands, Rest of Laguna, Masbate, Metro Manila, Southernmost Portion of Occidental Mindoro, Southernmost Portion of Oriental Mindoro, Southern Portion of Pampanga, Polillo Islands, Rizal	Northern Samar	None
1	Southern Portion of Aurora, Rest of Bulacan, Southern Portion of Nueva Ecija, Northernmost Portion of Palawan, Rest of Pampanga, Southern Portion of Tarlac, Southern Portion of Zambales	Aklan, Northern Portion of Antique, Capiz, Northern Portion of Eastern Samar, Northeastern Portion of Iloilo, Northern Portion of Samar	None

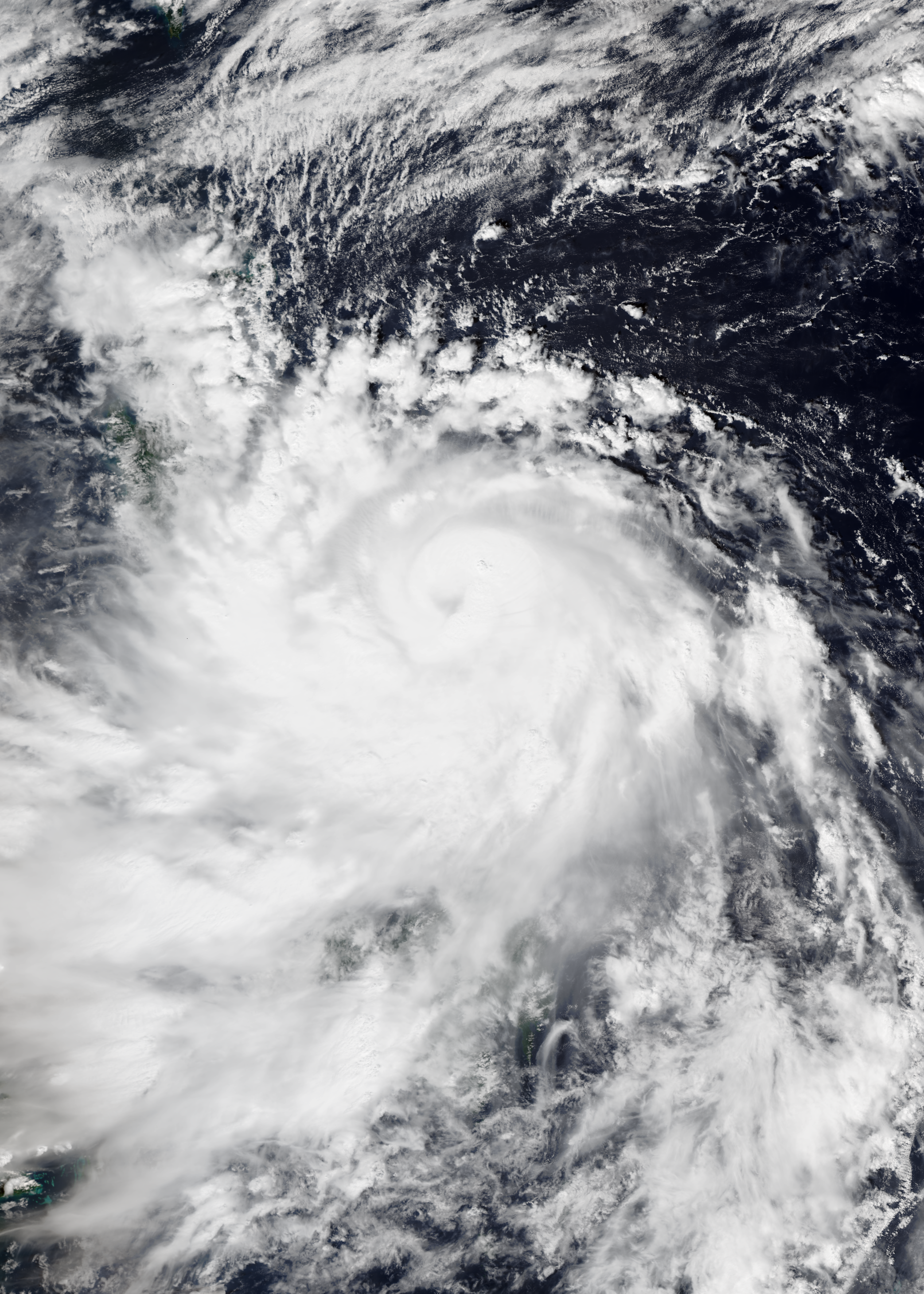
Molave shortly before landfall in the Philippines on October 25

On October 24, 2020, the Philippine Institute of Volcanology and Seismology (PHIVOLCS) warned of lahars down the slopes of Mayon Volcano in Bicol Region during the typhoon. Nearly 9,000 people were forced to flee their homes in the Philippines, where sea travel was suspended as the storm approached. The opening of the 2020 season of the Philippines Football League (PFL) is postponed to October 28 due to the inclement weather from the typhoon and five players and coaches testing positive for COVID-19 during the ongoing COVID-19 pandemic in the Philippines. Classes and government work were suspended in some areas on October 26, 2020, during the typhoon.

=== Vietnam ===
Nearly 1.3 million people are expected to evacuate in Vietnam, as Prime Minister Nguyen Xuan Phuc ordered boats onshore and advised preparations for the security forces and residents in the area. The prime minister also compared Molave to Typhoon Damrey of 2017. Hundreds of flights were canceled and schools were forced to close. The federal government mobilized about 250,000 troops and 2,300 vehicles to be used for search and rescue missions. Members of the Vietnamese military helped load elderly people onto evacuation buses and helped direct boats onshore. Some also helped residents put sandbags on their roof. On October 27, Da Nang People's Committee had requested people to not leave their houses starting from 20:00 UTC+7 (13:00 UTC) that night and urged all officials and workers to not come into work on the next day, among other measures in preparation for the typhoon.

== Impact and aftermath ==
Deaths and damage from Typhoon Molave
Countries	Fatalities		Damage (2020 USD)	Ref
Countries	Death	Injured	Damage (2020 USD)	
Philippines	27	40	$87.2 million	
Vietnam	41	143	$573 million	
Malaysia	2	0	Unknown	
Thailand	1	3	$17 million	
Cambodia	44	Unknown	$65.4 million	
Totals	116	186	$743 million	

=== Philippines ===
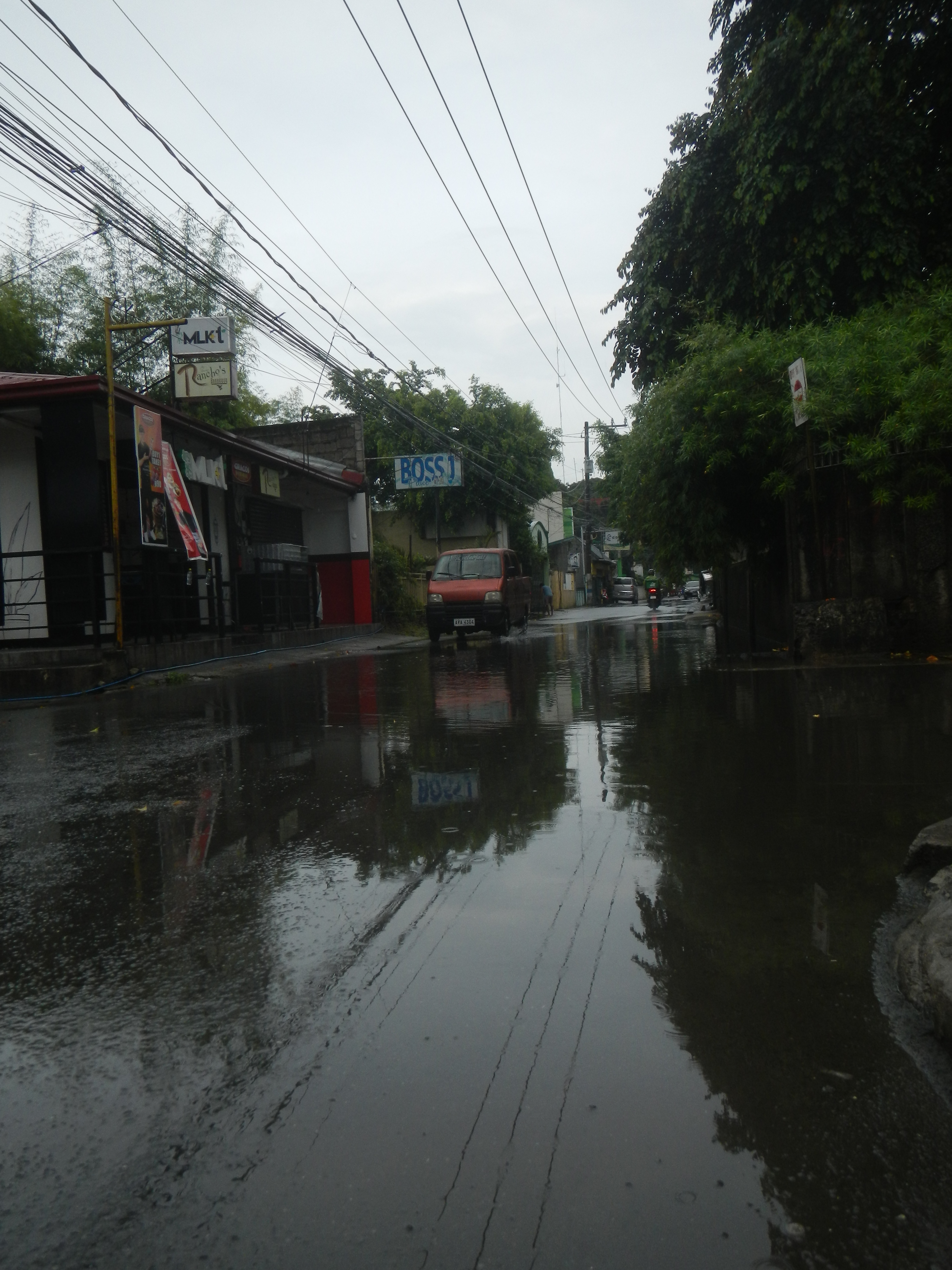
Street flooding caused by Molave in Baliwag

Typhoon Molave came ashore in the Philippines on October 25 with maximum sustained winds of 130 km/h (81 mph) on October 25. The National Disaster Risk Reduction and Management Council (NDRRMC) in the Philippines received reports of damaged roads and bridges, flooding, and landslides that same day. Several villages and farmlands in the region were flooded and power lines and trees were downed, resulting in power outages affecting Albay, Sorsogon, Batangas and Cavite. 120,000 people were displaced and over 1,800 workers were stranded in ports. A state of calamity was declared early on October 27 for the city of Batangas, due to "widespread destruction and substantial damage" caused by the storm.

A yacht off the coast of Batangas Province sank and 7 fishermen were rescued while 12 other fishermen on a boat were reported missing near Catanduanes. Floods caused by Typhoon Saudel in Quezon just a couple of days prior were immediately worsened by Molave. Molave also impacted areas still recovering from the impacts of Typhoon Kammuri (Tisoy) one year earlier, causing residents to flee back to their evacuation centers. Agricultural damage in Bicol reached ₱286 million (US$5.9 million). 6,671 of houses were damaged and 243 of them were totally destroyed by Molave. In Oriental Mindoro, the government estimated the agricultural loss at ₱2 billion (US$41.3 million). The Philippine government organized a disaster relief aid following the typhoon supplying ₱890.5 million worth of food and other items to those affected. The filming of GMA Network's television drama anthology series titled Tadhana in Laiya Beach in Batangas was disrupted by a storm surge.

As of November 9, the NDRRMC reported that 27 people were killed, 40 people were injured and four went missing after the typhoon. Damage from infrastructure and agriculture counted to be ₱1.56 billion (US$32.2 million) and ₱2.66 billion (US$55 million) respectively, with a total damage of ₱4.22 billion (US$87.2 million) nationwide.

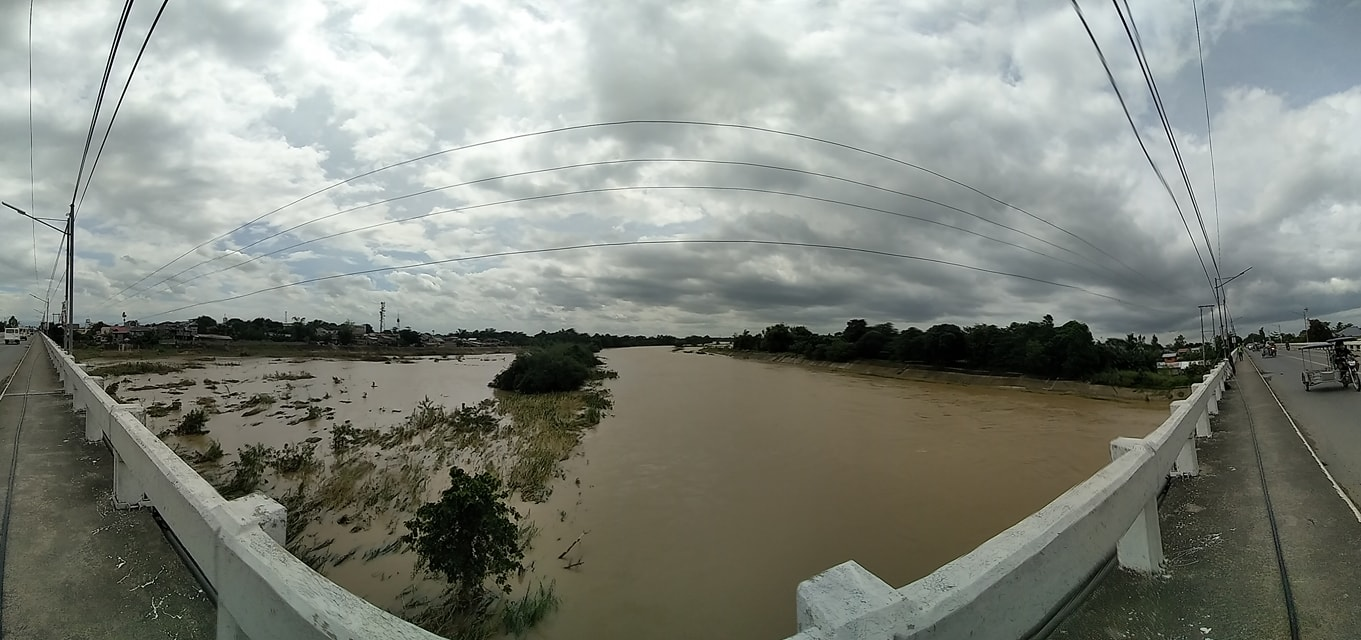
Flooding of Pampanga River floodplain after Typhoon Quinta, 2020 (view from Santa Rosa, Nueva Ecija bridge)

=== Vietnam ===
Costliest tropical cyclones in Vietnam
Rank	Storm	Season	Damage		Ref.
Rank	Storm	Season	VND	USD	Ref.
1	Yagi	2024	84.5 trillion	$3.47 billion	
2	Bualoi	2025	23.9 trillion	$950 million	
3	Damrey	2017	22.7 trillion	$1 billion	
4	Matmo	2025	21 trillion	$837 million	
5	Doksuri	2017	18.4 trillion	$809 million	
6	Ketsana	2009	16.1 trillion	$896 million	
7	Wutip	2013	13.6 trillion	$648 million	
8	Molave	2020	13.3 trillion	$573 million	
9	TD 23W	2017	13.1 trillion	$579 million	
10	Kalmaegi	2025	13.1 trillion	$521 million	

On October 27, the typhoon caused two Vietnamese fishing boats in the South China Sea to sink. Authorities deployed search boats to search for 26 missing fishermen that were on the boats.

Molave started affecting Vietnam during the evening of October 27. On the morning of October 28, the entire island of Lý Sơn and its 20,000 inhabitants lost electric power. A weather station on the island recorded sustained winds of 112 km/h (69 mph) and gusts of 148 km/h (92 mph). Waves as high as 6 m (20 ft) lashed coastal areas of Vietnam. Molave caused widespread destruction in Central Vietnam. The Bình Châu station in Quảng Ngãi recorded sustained winds of 122 km/h (76 mph) and gusts of 151 km/h (94 mph). Molave brought heavy rains; Sơn Kỳ (Quảng Ngãi) received 470 mm (19 in) over 24 hours of rainfall. Immense rainfall triggered three landslides in Phước Sơn and Nam Trà My districts and buried some villages, with the recovery of at least 21 bodies under rubble. Flooding also isolated 200 workers at the Đăk Mi 2 hydroelectricity plant. The typhoon and following flooding and landslides destroyed or damaged 188,759 houses and infrastructures, flooded 31,928 others and 27,970 hectas of crops.

Molave killed 41 people, injured 143 and 42 others went missing. Economic losses were counted as 13.27 trillion dong (US$572.9 million), including 6.08 trillion dong (US$262.6 million) in Quảng Nam and 5 trillion dong (US$215.7 million) in Quảng Ngãi Province.

=== Malaysia ===
On October 27, the typhoon caused the MV Dayang Topaz to swerve uncontrollably and hit the structure of a drilling platform 14 nautical miles off Miri after one of its anchor cables snapped. A rescue operation was mounted by the Malaysian Maritime Enforcement Agency with the assistance from an oil company in Brunei. Two among the 187 personnel on board were killed.

=== Thailand ===
On November 1, a person was reported dead from the northeastern floods.

== Retirement ==
On November 13, PAGASA announced that the name Quinta would be removed from its list of typhoon names as this typhoon caused almost ₱5 billion in damages and will never be used again as a typhoon name within the Philippine Area of Responsibility (PAR). In January 2021, the PAGASA chose the name Querubin as its replacement and was used for the first time during 2024 season.

In the spring of 2022, the Typhoon Committee announced that the name Molave, along with four others, will be removed from the naming lists. The committee decided Molave would be replaced by Narra.

== See also ==
- Weather of 2020
- Tropical cyclones in 2020
- List of Philippine typhoons (2000–present)
