= Typhoon Wutip (2013) =

Pacific typhoon in 2013

Typhoon Wutip (Paolo)
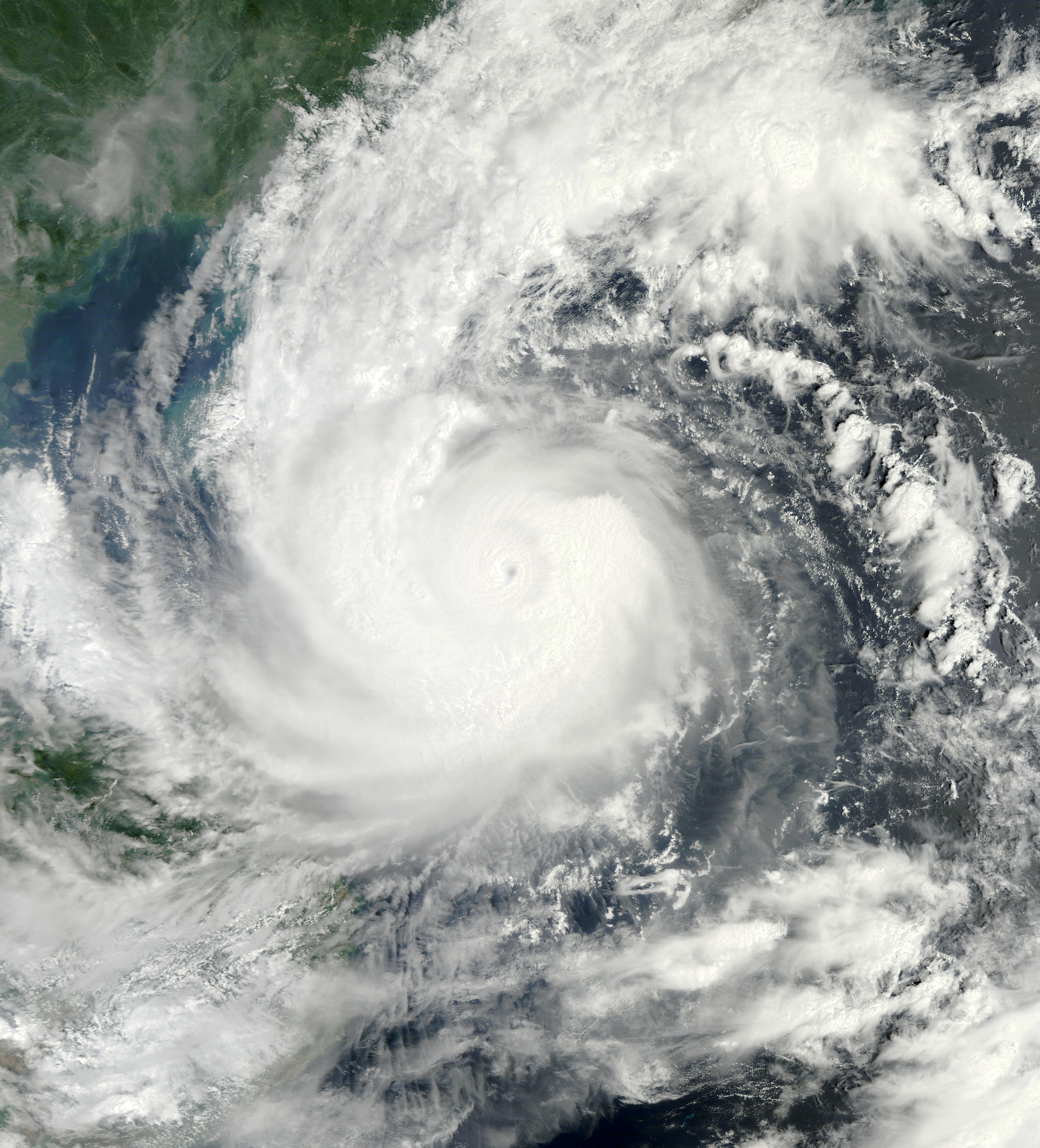
- Typhoon Wutip at peak intensity on September 29

Meteorological history
- Formed: September 25, 2013
- Dissipated: October 1, 2013

Typhoon
- 10-minute sustained (JMA)
- Highest winds: 120 km/h (75 mph)
- Lowest pressure: 965 hPa (mbar); 28.50 inHg

Category 3-equivalent typhoon
- 1-minute sustained (SSHWS/JTWC)
- Highest winds: 185 km/h (115 mph)
- Lowest pressure: 948 hPa (mbar); 27.99 inHg

Overall effects
- Fatalities: 27 total
- Damage: $648 million (2013 USD)
- Areas affected: Philippines, Hainan, Vietnam, Laos, Thailand
- IBTrACS
- Part of the 2013 Pacific typhoon season

Typhoon Wutip, (Note: The name Wutip (Cantonese: 蝴蝶, [wuː˨˩ tiːp̚˨]) was contributed by Macau and means butterfly in Cantonese.) known in the Philippines as Tropical Storm Paolo, was a Category 3 major typhoon that affected Vietnam, Laos, and Thailand in late September 2013. The nineteenth named storm and the fifth typhoon of the 2013 Pacific typhoon season. Wutip formed off the coast of Luzon on September 27, 2013. Being inside PAR, PAGASA named the disturbance Paolo which replaced the name Pepeng. JTWC later gave the identifier Tropical Depression 20W. Moving west-southwestward, the system intensified into a tropical storm, assigning the name Wutip. Wutip reached its peak intensity as a Category 3-equivalent typhoon. On September 30, the storm made landfall on the provinces from Ha Tinh to Thua Thien Hue province of Vietnam, including Quang Binh the center of the storm.

Wutip killed at least 25 people in southeastern Asia and $648 million worth of damages during late September and early October.

== Meteorological history ==
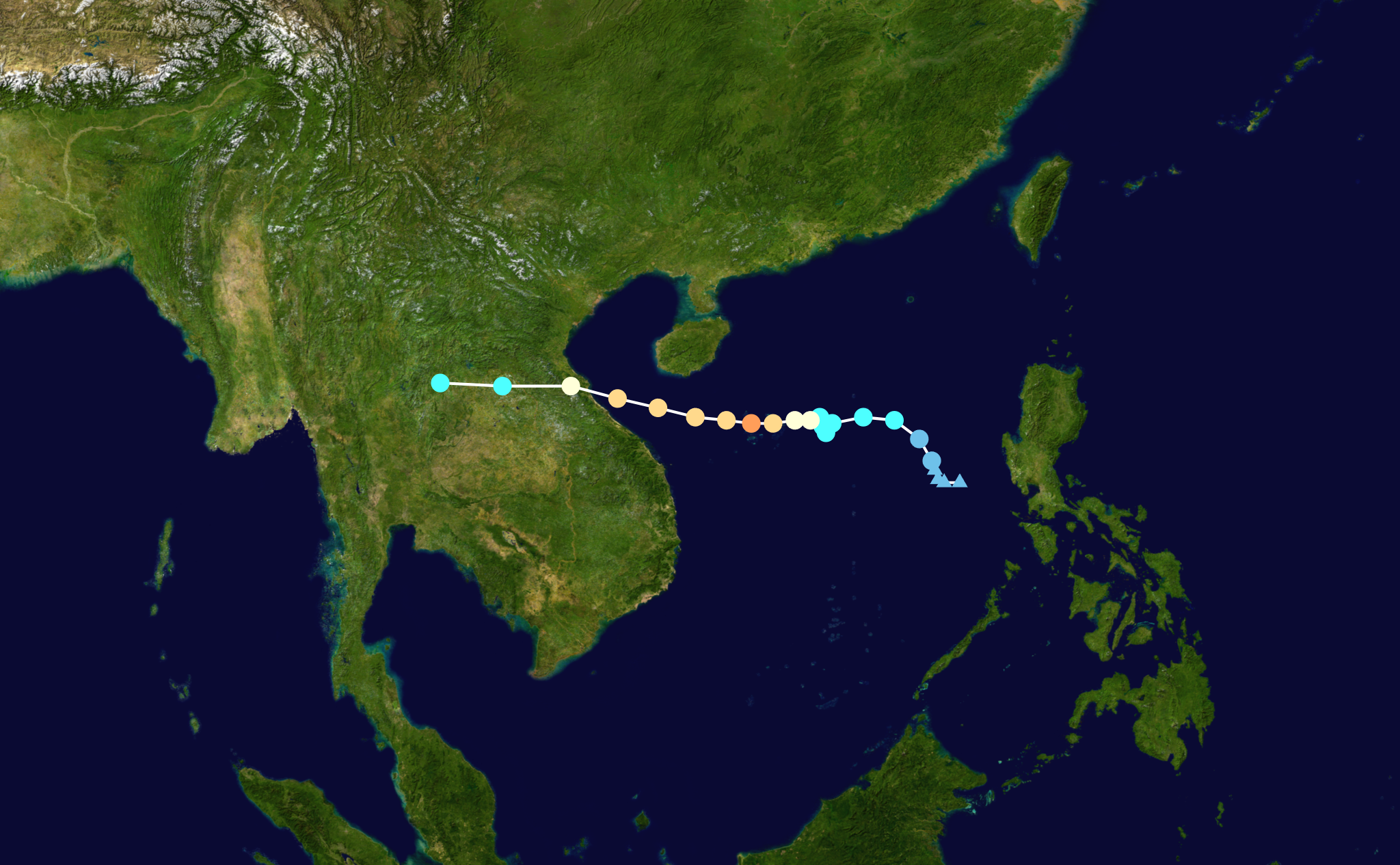
Map plotting the storm's track and intensity, according to the Saffir–Simpson scale Map key Saffir–Simpson scale Tropical depression (≤38 mph, ≤62 km/h) Tropical storm (39–73 mph, 63–118 km/h) Category 1 (74–95 mph, 119–153 km/h) Category 2 (96–110 mph, 154–177 km/h) Category 3 (111–129 mph, 178–208 km/h) Category 4 (130–156 mph, 209–251 km/h) Category 5 (≥157 mph, ≥252 km/h) Unknown Storm type Tropical cyclone Subtropical cyclone Extratropical cyclone, remnant low, tropical disturbance, or monsoon depression

A tropical disturbance formed from the southwest monsoon which was enhanced by Pabuk on September 23. On September 25, it became a tropical depression and slowly intensifies off the west coast of the Philippines and named it Paolo by the PAGASA and designated 20W by the JTWC early the next day.

The system tracked west and strengthened into a tropical storm and named it Wutip (1321) on September 27 as it brought light to heavy rainfall across Luzon, Philippines. Tropical Storm Wutip became a severe tropical storm as it moved westwards on September 28, and rapidly became a typhoon.

On September 29, Wutip became a Moderate Typhoon as it created an eye towards Thailand. It was rapidly downgraded by a tropical storm as it moved westwards on September 30. It slowly dissipated and crossed the 100th meridian very early on October 2.

== Impact ==
Deaths by country
China	14
Vietnam	13
Total	27

=== China ===
A total of 14 people were killed in China, and total damages were amounted to be ¥20 million (US$3.27 million).

=== Vietnam ===
List of Vietnamese weather stations that recorded sustained wind speeds of Force 8 or higher on the Beaufort scale (62 km/h or higher)
Province or Municipality	Station	Maximum sustained wind speeds	Peak gusts
Nghệ An	Hòn Ngư Island	68 km/h	101 km/h
Hà Tĩnh	Kỳ Anh	83 km/h	119 km/h
Hà Tĩnh	Hà Tĩnh	68 km/h	76 km/h
Quảng Bình	Đồng Hới	79 km/h	126 km/h
Quảng Bình	Ba Đồn	94 km/h	158 km/h
Quảng Bình	Tuyên Hóa	65 km/h	97 km/h
Quảng Trị	Cồn Cỏ Island	108 km/h	155 km/h
Quảng Ngãi	Lý Sơn	65 km/h	79 km/h

Costliest tropical cyclones in Vietnam
Rank	Storm	Season	Damage		Ref.
Rank	Storm	Season	VND	USD	Ref.
1	Yagi	2024	84.5 trillion	$3.47 billion	
2	Bualoi	2025	23.9 trillion	$950 million	
3	Damrey	2017	22.7 trillion	$1 billion	
4	Matmo	2025	21 trillion	$837 million	
5	Doksuri	2017	18.4 trillion	$809 million	
6	Ketsana	2009	16.1 trillion	$896 million	
7	Wutip	2013	13.6 trillion	$648 million	
8	Molave	2020	13.3 trillion	$573 million	
9	TD 23W	2017	13.1 trillion	$579 million	
10	Kalmaegi	2025	13.1 trillion	$521 million	

Storm made landfall in Quảng Bình Province on the afternoon of September 30, 2013 with winds of 11 Beauforts and gusts of 14 Beauforts (160 km/h). The storm made 500KV north-south line was separated from the grid without causing widespread power outages, 220 line kV, 110 kV and lower voltage lines in the north central area of failure, causing a power loss in Quảng Bình, Quảng Trị and Thừa Thiên–Huế as many trees, broken pole fell on the North–South Railway, leaving at least four trains paralyzed. Rain reached Vietnam on September 30 and then Thailand the following day.

2 people were killed when a radio tower serving the Voice of Vietnam in Quảng Bình fell on a car. Mr. Nguyen Tai Dung, deputy director of Nghe An Department of Agriculture was washed away, killed while on duty for flood relief in the town of Hoang Mai. Overall 13 people were killed, and total damage was estimated at ₫13.6 trillion (US$644 million).

== See also ==
- Typhoon Ketsana
- Typhoon Xangsane
- Typhoon Betty (1987)
- Tropical Storm Mekkhala (2008)
- Typhoon Doksuri (2017)
- Tropical Storm Wutip (2025) - A tropical storm but similar track and same name.
- Typhoon Kajiki (2025)
