= Trạm Tấu =

Trạm Tấu Xã Trạm Tấu
- Commune
- Trạm Tấu commune
- Location within Vietnam
- Coordinates: 21°28′12″N 104°22′36″E
- Country: Vietnam
- Region: Northwest
- Province: Lào Cai
- Time zone: UTC+7 (UTC + 7)

Trạm Tấu is a commune (commune) of Lào Cai Province, Vietnam.
