= Typhoon Rita (1972) =

Pacific typhoon in 1972

Typhoon Rita (Gloring)
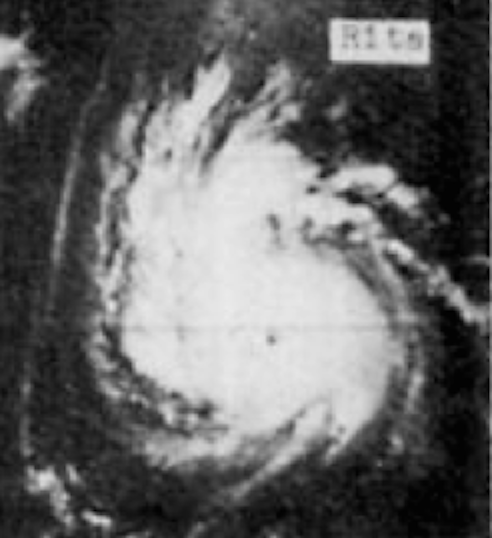
- Satellite image of Typhoon Rita (Gloring) intensifying on July 9 west of the Mariana Islands

Meteorological history
- Formed: July 5, 1972
- Extratropical: July 27, 1972
- Dissipated: July 30, 1972
- Duration: 3 weeks and 1 day

Category 5-equivalent super typhoon
- 1-minute sustained (SSHWS/JTWC)
- Highest winds: 270 km/h (165 mph)
- Lowest pressure: 911 hPa (mbar); 26.90 inHg

Overall effects
- Fatalities: 377 total (Note: Total deaths include direct and indirect effects. The 377 fatalities include 242 flood-related in the Philippines; 50 storm-related in China; 45 disease-related in the Philippines; 33 storm-related in South Korea; 3 storm-related in Taiwan; 3 storm-related in the Ryukyu Islands; 1 storm-related offshore)
- Damage: $445 million (1972 USD)
- Areas affected: Philippines, Japan (Kyushu and the Ryukyu Islands), Taiwan, South Korea, China (East, Northeast, and North), Mongolia
- IBTrACS
- Part of the 1972 Pacific typhoon season

Typhoon Rita, known in the Philippines as Typhoon Gloring, was one of the longest-lived Western Pacific tropical cyclones on record. Rita traversed the basin along an erratic path for 22 days. (Note: The record for longevity only consists of time spent as a tropical cyclone; including non-tropical phases. Overall, Rita lasted for 24.5 days.) The second of four simultaneously developing storms, Rita was first identified to the southeast of Guam on July 5, 1972.

== Meteorological history ==
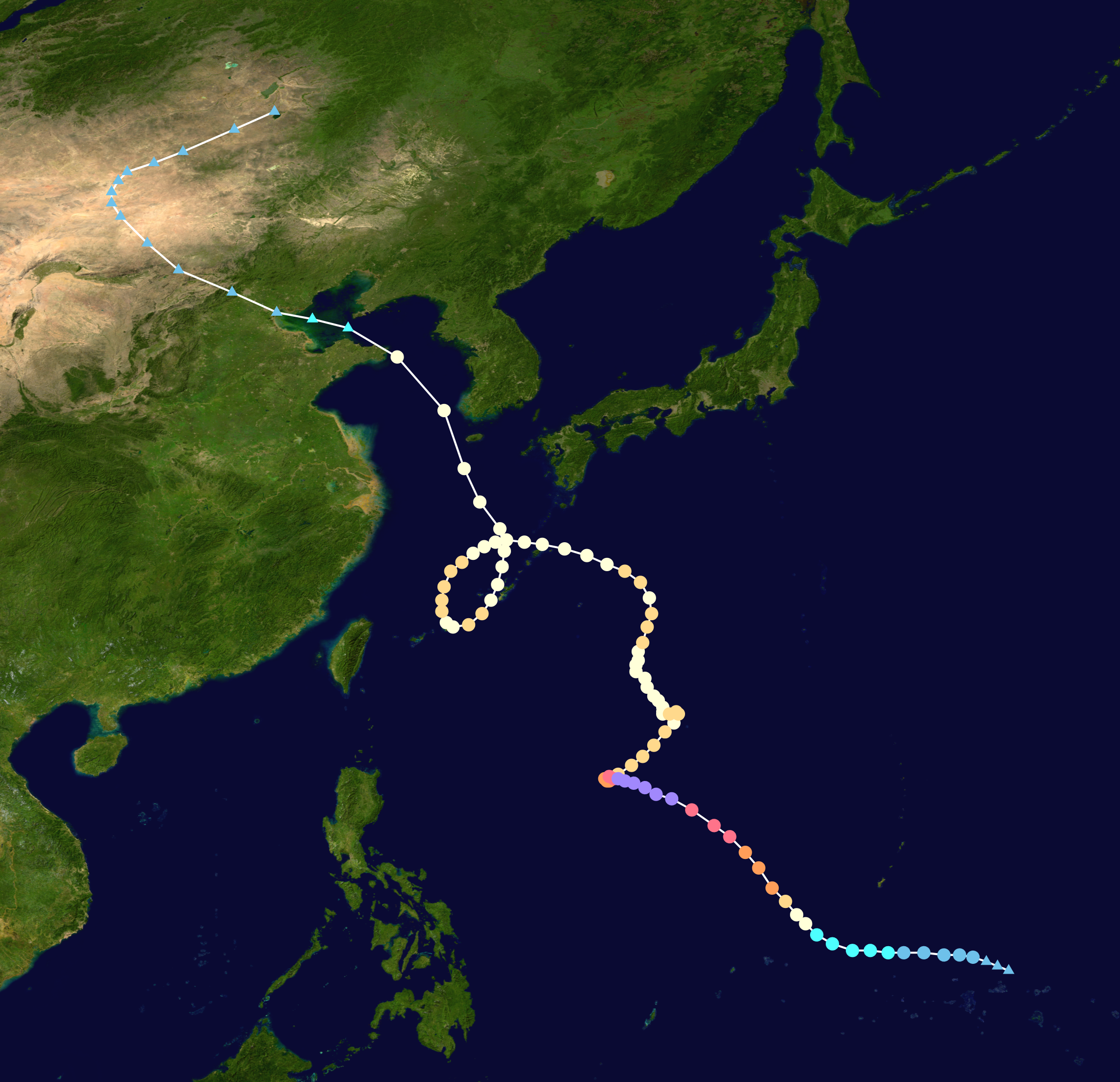
Map plotting the storm's track and intensity, according to the Saffir–Simpson scale Map key Saffir–Simpson scale Tropical depression (≤38 mph, ≤62 km/h) Tropical storm (39–73 mph, 63–118 km/h) Category 1 (74–95 mph, 119–153 km/h) Category 2 (96–110 mph, 154–177 km/h) Category 3 (111–129 mph, 178–208 km/h) Category 4 (130–156 mph, 209–251 km/h) Category 5 (≥157 mph, ≥252 km/h) Unknown Storm type Tropical cyclone Subtropical cyclone Extratropical cyclone, remnant low, tropical disturbance, or monsoon depression

In early July 1972, conditions across the western Pacific were highly favorable for tropical cyclogenesis. Enhanced by an El Niño event, surface westerlies traversed the region south of an east–west near-equatorial trough that extended from east of the Philippines to well east of the Marshall Islands. On July 3, conditions in the upper troposphere over the basin underwent significant changes with two upper-level troughs developing in the midlatitudes; of note was one which moved southward from Japan. By July 5, four distinct disturbances had organized along the near-equatorial trough; however, limited data made further analysis on these systems difficult. The precursor to Rita specifically was situated to the southeast of Guam at this time. The Japan Meteorological Agency (JMA) classified the system as a tropical depression at 12:00 UTC that day.

On July 6, the precursor depression to Rita was invigorated as it interacted with a cutoff low to its north. Simultaneously, a subtropical ridge rapidly built on either side of the cutoff low. Within a complex upper-level environment, favorable outflow was able to form over the system and enhance convective development. It was estimated that the depression attained tropical storm-status by 00:00 UTC on July 7 while located south of Guam. Moving west and later northwest, the storm steadily intensified to typhoon status by 12:00 UTC the following day. Increasingly vigorous outflow, attributed to the cutoff low near Japan, enabled continued deepening of the cyclone over the next two days. Rita ultimately attained its peak intensity on July 11 as a Category 5-equivalent typhoon on the modern-day Saffir–Simpson hurricane wind scale with sustained winds of 270 km/h (170 mph) and a barometric pressure of 900 mbar (hPa; 26.58 inHg). At this time, the storm displayed a well-defined 37 km (23 mi) diameter eye.

At its peak, Rita was a somewhat lopsided system, with deep convection and cirrus clouds extending more to the northwest than any other quadrant. Following the typhoon's peak intensity, the cutoff low previously providing Rita with favorable outflow rapidly weakened. This resulted in a near-total collapse of outflow along the storm's northern side and prompted dramatic weakening. Simultaneously, the cyclone turned more westerly and slowed as an intensifying Typhoon Phyllis to its east began to influence Rita. Convection along the north side of the typhoon contracted significantly, with Rita's eye situated close to the edge of the convective canopy on July 12. In contrast to the weakening on the north side, outflow along the south side of Rita became more pronounced. By July 13, Rita had briefly stalled and began moving to northeast owing to a process known as the Fujiwhara effect. The once Category 5 system had degraded to minimal typhoon status by July 14.

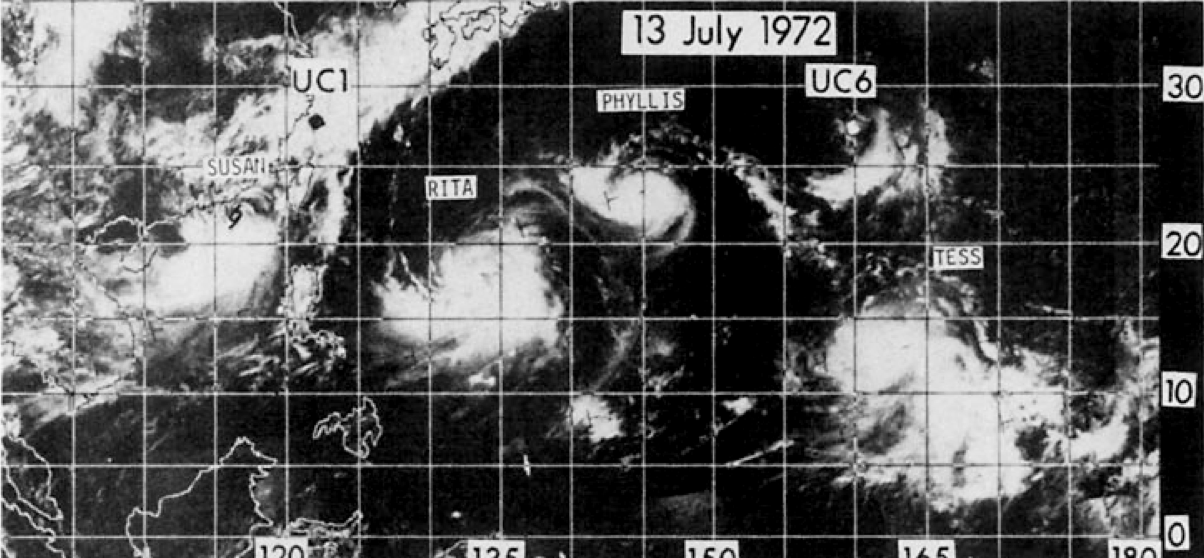
Four concurrent typhoons over the Western Pacific on July 13. From left to right: Susan, Rita, Phyllis, and Tess

On July 14 and 15, Rita again stalled as Typhoon Phyllis swung around to the north and headed to Japan. The storm re-intensified slightly during this period with winds reaching 160 km/h (99 mph) and its pressure dipping to 962 mbar (hPa; 28.41 inHg). This re-invigoration was short-lived as Rita weakened soon thereafter and began moving slowly to the north-northwest. The typhoon maintained its intensity for two days until a new outflow channel established itself over the storm. This channel, previously aiding the development of Typhoon Tess to the west, enabled Rita to attain winds of 175 km/h (109 mph) on July 18. Alongside the increase in winds was a dramatic increase in the storm's size; by July 18 gale-force winds spanned an area approximately 1,290 km (800 mi) across. Another major shift in the typhoon's course took place that day as a ridge build over the Sea of Japan and imparted a more westerly track.

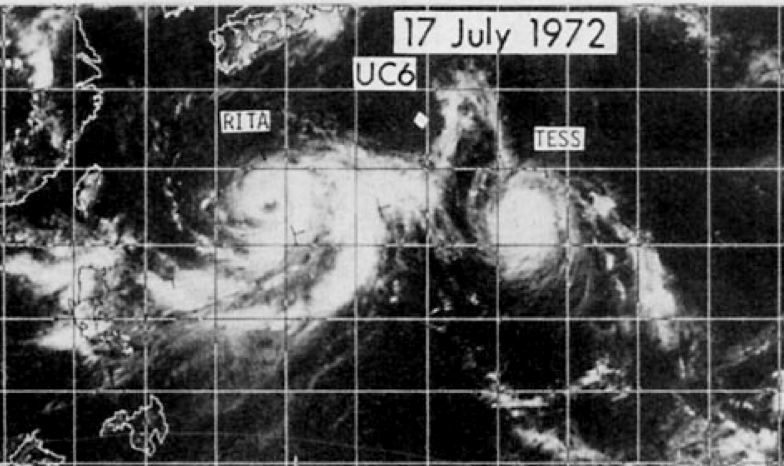
Typhoons Rita and Tess on July 17. Rita's greatly enlarged circulation can be easily seen as it dwarfs nearby Tess to its east.

Weakening slightly once more Rita passed through the Ryukyu Islands of Japan on July 20, with its center passing just north of Amami Ōshima; a pressure of 968.9 mb (hPa; 28.61 inHg) was measured there. Typhoon-force winds were measured 150 km (93 mi) north of the center at this time on Gajajima. Upon moving over the East China Sea on July 21, an unusual set of conditions prompted Rita to turn southwest. The two main factors in this were the presence of a low over Manchuria which resulted in slower forward movement and Typhoon Tess located 1,480 km (920 mi) east which pulled the storm south due to the Fujiwhara effect. Over the following three and a half days, the typhoon looped along the edge of the Ryukyu Islands, fluctuating in strength all the while. The center of Rita brushed Miyako-jima as a Category 1-equivalent typhoon on July 23 and Okinawa as Category 2-equivalent the following day.

Rita completed its cyclonic loop on July 25 and subsequently accelerated northward as it moved into a convergent flow region between the Manchuria low and the ridge near Japan. The storm skirted the Korean Peninsula on July 26, passing near Jeju Province off the southwestern coast of South Korea, before moving over the Yellow Sea. Turning westward over the Sea, Rita brushed the northern coast of Shandong Peninsula in China before transitioning into an extratropical cyclone over the Bohai Sea around 12:00 UTC on July 26 according to the JMA's best track. Thereafter, the storm's winds dropped below typhoon force for the first time since it attained such winds 18 days prior. Rita then made landfall near Tianjin, China as a weakening system. Though judged to be extratropical by the JMA at this time, the China Meteorological Agency asserts that Rita remained tropical until its landfall in accordance with radar imagery and radiosonde observations. Regardless of the true nature of the system as it struck North China, Rita further degraded over land. The remnant low persisted for several more days as it moved through Northern China and eventually Mongolia by July 28. The remnants of Rita were last noted on July 30, as a 1000 mb (hPa; 29.53 inHg) low over Northeast China.

== Impact ==
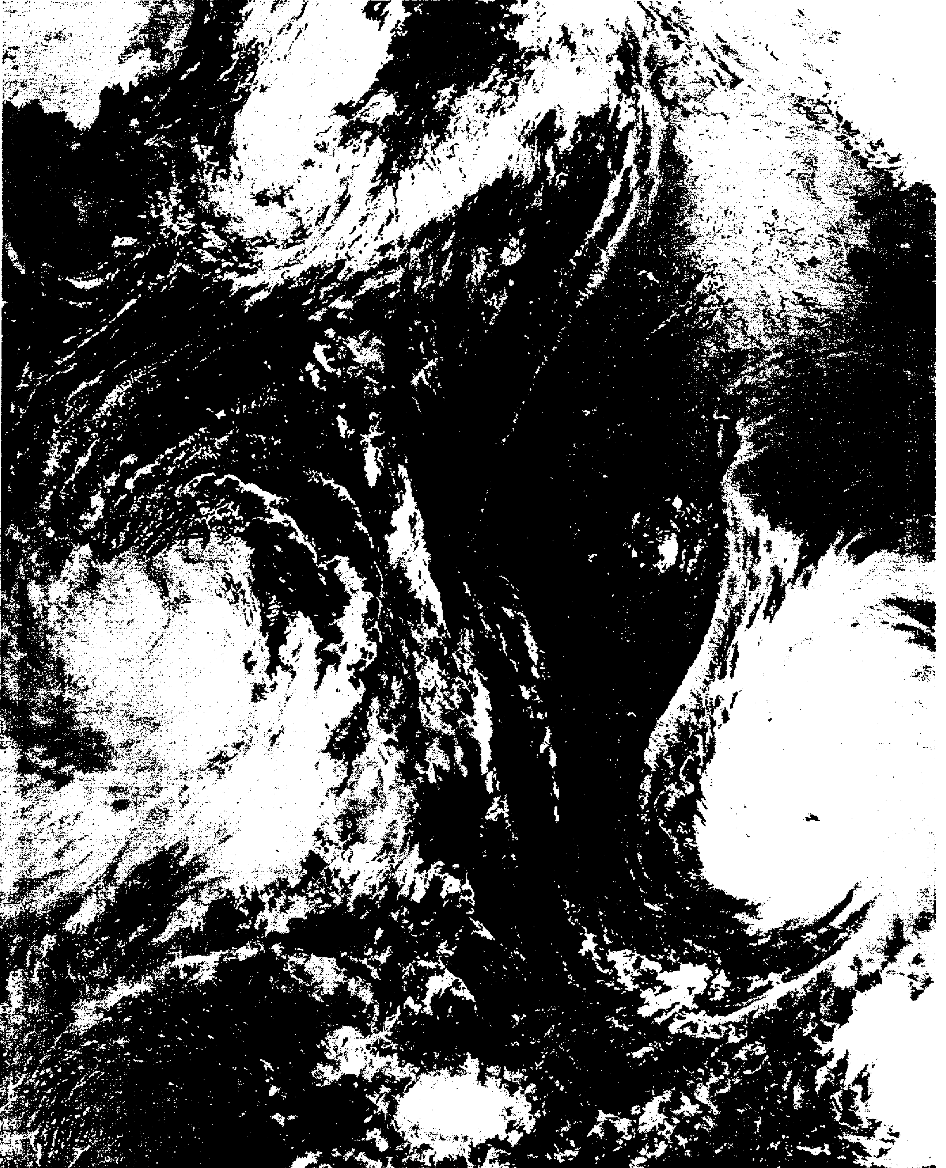
Typhoons Rita (left) and Tess (right), and the remnants of Phyllis (top), on July 15

On July 8, a United States Air Force B-52 heading to Vietnam was caught in the circulation of Rita and crashed less than 280 km (170 mi) west of the storm. Shortly after the incident, seven aircraft were deployed for search-and-rescue while a Japanese merchant vessel, the Ariake, provided assistance. A United States Coast Guard Cutter, Basswood, was also sent to the area. Initial reports stated that all six of the aircraft's crew had been spotted amid 3 m (9.8 ft) swells. Of the six crew, one died and the remaining five were rescued by the submarines Barb and Gurnard on July 9.

Southwestern South Korea was the last area significantly impacted by the typhoon. There, heavy rains and high winds resulted in up to 33 fatalities. More than 200 buildings and 50 boats were destroyed as well.

=== Philippines ===
Although Rita remained well away from the Philippines, its tremendous circulation enhanced the southwest monsoon over Luzon for several days, particularly on July 17. Already suffering from floods caused by Typhoon Susan days earlier, which killed at least 20 people, prolonged heavy rains resulted in one of the worst flood disasters for the region. In a 24‑hour span, 18.86 in (479 mm) of rain fell in Baguio. Newspaper reports regarded it as the worst flooding since World War II, with 14 provinces along a 320 km (200 mi) swath north of Manila affected. Hundreds of towns and villages across Luzon were isolated by rising waters. Particularly hard hit were Pampanga and Tarlac provinces which were almost entirely flooded by the torrential rains and a series of dam and dike failures. Helicopters and amphibious vehicles were deployed to the two provinces in order to evacuate more than 55,000 people in need of aid. Across Bulacan and Pampanga, 166 villages were isolated by flood waters and an estimated 50,000 people were at-risk of famine in Pampanga. Helicopters from the U.S. Air Force rescued 180 people clinging to treetops in Arayat, Pampanga.

Between July 18 and 19, 25 people perished in various incidents across Pangasinan province. The capital city of Manila was hard-hit as well, with 90% of the area underwater. Over a four-day period, 1,174 mm (46.2 in) of rain fell in the region, with a record 472 mm (18.6 in) falling during the overnight of July 20–21. Schools and businesses were shut down for two consecutive days there. More than 50 shelters were opened up across Manila and were expected to provide food and housing to 14,000 residents. Flooding began to recede on July 22 as rains abated.

In all, an estimated 242 people died in the floods and damage amounted to more than $445 million. By July 20, an estimated one million people were in need of assistance from the disaster and approximately two million were affected. Estimates from the Red Cross indicated that more than 500,000 people were homeless.

=== East China Sea ===
Radar image of Rita near Tianjin, China, at 01:46 UTC on July 27, 1972

Rita's unusual track across the East China Sea resulted in the Ryukyu Islands being affected for five days. During this period, the highest winds measured across the archipelago were 178 km/h (111 mph) on Kume Island while the lowest pressure was 955.6 mb (hPa; 28.22 inHg) at the Marine Corps Air Station Futenma on Okinawa. Much of the region received heavy rain and a storm maxima of 810 mm (32 in) on Okinoerabujima. Primary damage from the storm was to agriculture, with 30–35% of the sugar cane and pineapple crop lost. In all, three people died in the region due to Rita.

Taiwan was also subjected to heavy rains from the typhoon's outer bands with up to 384 millimetres (15.1 in) falling in mountainous areas. Flooding affected several villages and left 700 people homeless. A train traveling from Kaohsiung to Fangliao was derailed. Three people were killed across the island.

=== North China ===
Rita caused one of the largest storm surges along the Bohai Sea, with a maximum value of 2.09 m (6.9 ft) at the Huludao port. From Tianjin to Dalian port, thousands of boats were destroyed and the breakwaters were damaged. Seawater rushed onto land, resulting in salinization of soil. Beijing also experienced heavy rain and strong winds. Zaoshulin in the Huairou District of Beijing received 479.2 mm (18.87 in) of rain in one day, which resulted in debris flows in mountainous areas and killed about 50 people.

== Aftermath ==
=== Philippines ===
By July 19, President Ferdinand Marcos placed the National Defense and Social Welfare Departments on 24-hour duty and allocated $8.2 million in relief funds. The following day, Marcos ordered that all available watercraft be used to aid in rescue operations across Luzon. An appeal was made by authorities on July 21 for an immediate airlift of food to an estimated 115,000 people in Tarlac Province feared to be starving after being isolated by the floods. Presidential Secretary Alejandro Melchor stated that relief efforts were severely inadequate and relief teams had not reached the hard-hit Pangasinan Province by July 21. On July 24, Marcos temporarily moved his office from Manila to Lingayen, Pangasinan in order to oversee relief operations more directly. A 1,000 bed hospital was set up at the Presidential Malacañang Palace, with the president's wife remaining there to oversee operations. Funding for the disaster was increased to $75 million from $37 million that day. He and his cabinet members conducted surveys of the flooding on four consecutive days.

The United States Thirteenth Air Force stationed at Clark Air Base provided three Sikorsky MH-53 helicopters and a C-130 cargo plane to assist in relief operations. Four U.S. medical teams from Okinawa were deployed to Luzon to assist. Food was also being provided to evacuees at the U.S. Naval Base Subic Bay. The USS Tripoli and accompanying support ships were redirected by the U.S. Navy from Okinawa to Luzon. Arriving on July 22, the 104-man-strong U.S. Army Disaster Area Response Team aboard the USS Tripoli began relief operations immediately. On that day, seven U.S. Air Force C-130s, two Philippine Air Force Fokker F27s, and two helicopters delivered 60,000 tons of relief goods and medical supplies as well as 200,000 nutribuns (high-protein bread).

Complicating relief efforts were guerrilla incidents with member of the Communist Party of the Philippines. On July 21, a U.S. helicopter was shot at 14 times and forced to abandon its mission. Additionally, impatient victims tried to ransack trucks carrying supplies on July 24, forcing officials to fire warning shots in the air to dispel them. Of greatest concern in the storm's wake was an outbreak of typhoid and cholera, which claimed at least 45 lives by July 26. On July 25, six people were killed by cobras displaced by the floods in Santa Rita, Pampanga.

== See also ==
- List of tropical cyclone records
- Typhoon Ophelia (1960)
- Typhoon Wayne (1986) – A similarly long-lived and erratically moving storm
- Tropical Storm Lucille – A storm in 1960 that caused similarly deadly flooding in and around Manila
- Typhoon Damrey (2012)
- Typhoon Lionrock (2016)
- Typhoon Noru (2017) — Tied with Rita for second longest-lived Northwest pacific Tropical cyclone.
- Typhoon Khanun (2023)
