= Typhoon Ophelia =

Pacific typhoon in 1960

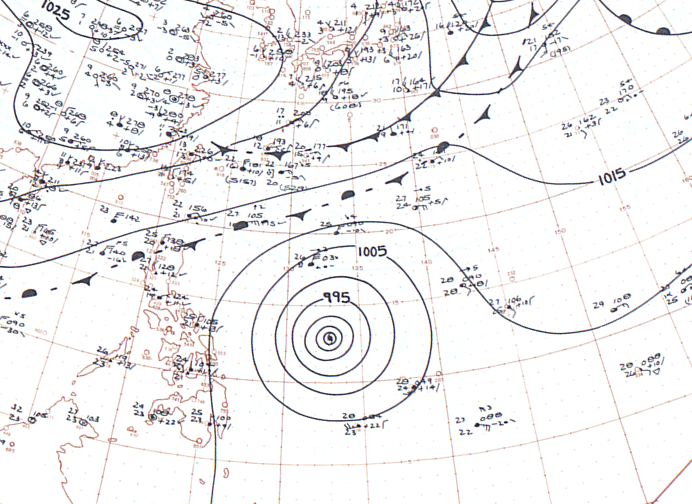
- Surface weather analysis of Ophelia on December 1

Meteorological history
- Formed: November 21, 1960
- Extratropical: December 6, 1960
- Dissipated: December 10, 1960

Typhoon
- 10-minute sustained (JMA)
- Lowest pressure: 925 hPa (mbar); 27.32 inHg

Category 4-equivalent super typhoon
- 1-minute sustained (SSHWS/JTWC)
- Highest winds: 250 km/h (155 mph)
- Lowest pressure: 928 hPa (mbar); 27.40 inHg

Super typhoon
- 2-minute sustained (CMA)
- Highest winds: 270 km/h (165 mph)
- Lowest pressure: 928 hPa (mbar); 27.40 inHg

Overall effects
- Fatalities: 7 total
- Areas affected: Ulithi Atoll, Yap, and Japan
- IBTrACS
- Part of the 1960 Pacific typhoon season

Typhoon Ophelia was a long-lived and powerful tropical cyclone that had devastating impacts on the small atoll of Ulithi in the Caroline Islands. Forming as a tropical depression on November 21, 1960 near Enewetak Atoll, the incipient cyclone struggled to develop. (Note: For consistency, Coordinated Universal Time (UTC) is used for all references of time as the cyclone existed in multiple time zones throughout its existence.) Moving haphazardly along an s-shaped track over the western Pacific Ocean, it degenerated into a disturbance two days later. By November 27, the system reorganized and was classified a tropical depression for a second time well to the southeast of Guam. Moving slowly west-southwest, it steadily intensified into a tropical storm later that day and further into a typhoon on November 29 as it gained a steady westward track. The following day, the eye of Ophelia passed directly over Ulithi atoll with winds estimated at 230 km/h (140 mph). (Note: All mentions of sustained winds are in one-minute mean standards unless otherwise noted.)

Turning gradually to the north, the typhoon attained peak winds of 250 km/h (160 mph) on December 1. Maintaining strength as a powerful system for several days, the storm remained over open waters. By December 4, it began to weaken as upper-level winds became unfavorable and forced the cyclone to move northeast. Passing Japan well to the southeast that day, its large circulation brought increased winds to the Tokyo area and heavy rain and snow to parts of the nation. Ophelia soon underwent an extratropical transition as it raced over the open Pacific, completing this structural change by December 6. Its remnants later crossed the International Date Line and dissipated over the Gulf of Alaska on December 10.

Ophelia devastated much of Ulithi during its passage, damaging or destroying most structures and killing two people. Agriculture across the area was decimated and geographic changes to coastlines were noted. In Ophelia's wake, dramatic societal changes in the Ulithian culture arose. Traditional values were abandoned in favor of more western ones, with younger individuals attaining a notable increase in power. The local King was disposed of shortly after the storm and a total change in authority took place. In addition to the severe impact in Ulithi, the typhoon was blamed for the deaths of five fishermen when their vessel collided with a coral reef. The name Ophelia was later retired, though unusually its removal was due to its meteorological significance due to its long track and prolonged time as a significant typhoon rather than for loss of life or damage.

== Meteorological history ==
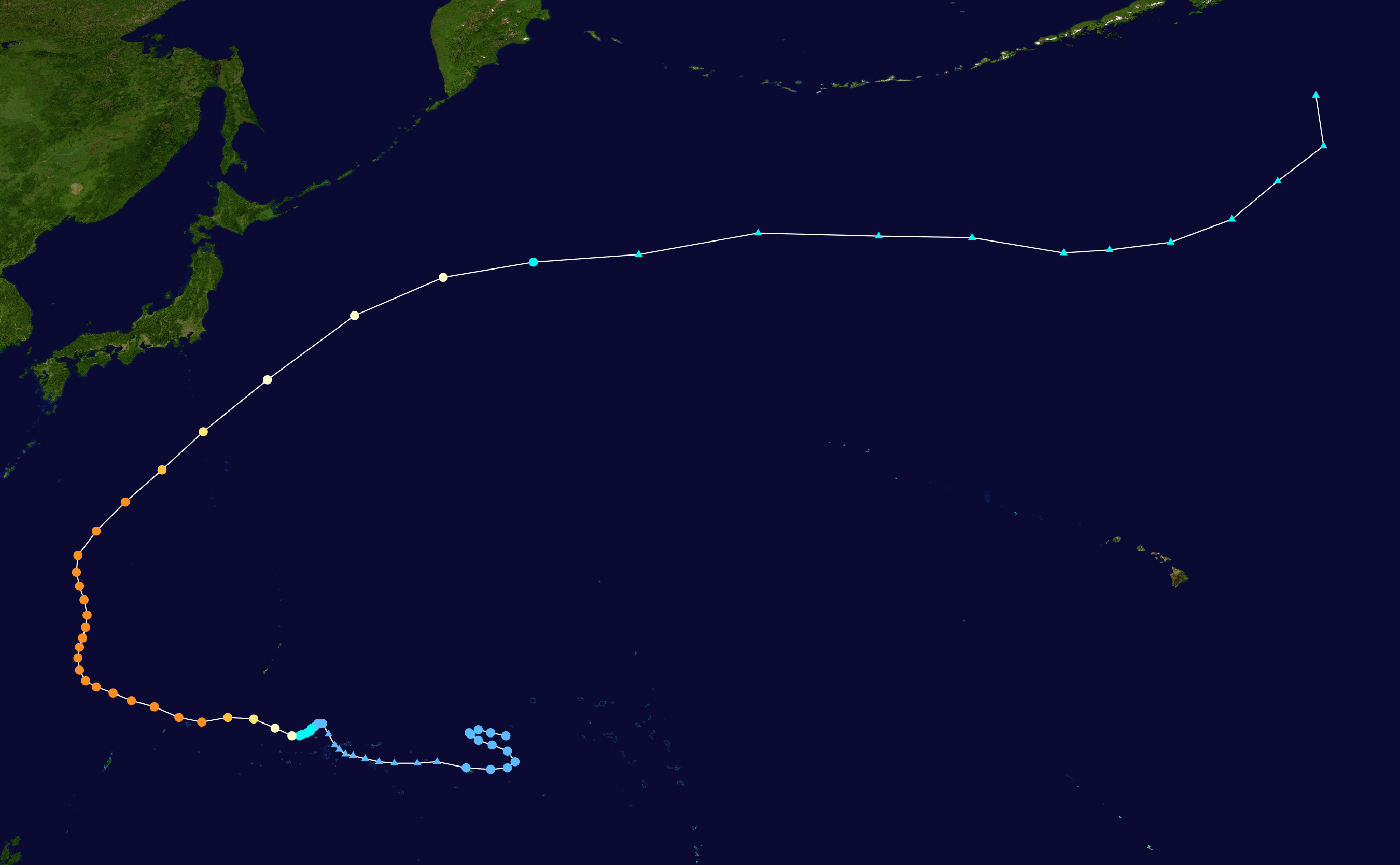
Map plotting the storm's track and intensity, according to the Saffir–Simpson scale Map key Saffir–Simpson scale Tropical depression (≤38 mph, ≤62 km/h) Tropical storm (39–73 mph, 63–118 km/h) Category 1 (74–95 mph, 119–153 km/h) Category 2 (96–110 mph, 154–177 km/h) Category 3 (111–129 mph, 178–208 km/h) Category 4 (130–156 mph, 209–251 km/h) Category 5 (≥157 mph, ≥252 km/h) Unknown Storm type Tropical cyclone Subtropical cyclone Extratropical cyclone, remnant low, tropical disturbance, or monsoon depression

On November 21, 1960, the formation of a small low-pressure area was noted following a shift in surface winds on Kwajalein Atoll in the Marshall Islands. Slowly developing, the low organized into a tropical depression by 1200 UTC, the 24th of the season. At this time, it was situated 270 km (170 mi) southwest of Enewetak Atoll. Though classified a depression, maximum sustained winds were only estimated at 35 km/h (22 mph). For unknown reasons, the system soon became diffuse and abruptly shifted direction to the east-southeast. Concurrently the cyclone lost its identity as a tropical cyclone and the Joint Typhoon Warning Center (JTWC) discontinued advisories on it by 0600 UTC on November 24. The remnant disturbance subsequently doubled back to the west, bypassing the islands of Pohnpei and Chuuk before re-intensifying.

A circulation began redeveloping on November 26 and at 0000 UTC the next day, the JTWC reclassified the system as a tropical depression; the rejuvenated depression was situated 465 km (289 mi) southeast of Guam at this time. Over the next two days, the storm drifted west-southwest at an average speed of 3 km/h (1.9 mph). Roughly 18 hours after regeneration, the depression attained tropical storm status and was assigned the name Ophelia. Initially, Ophelia was forecast to turn northward and impact the Mariana Islands but it ultimately followed a "sinusoidal pattern" path west. Steady intensification took place through November 30, with Ophelia attaining typhoon status at 0000 UTC on November 29. By 0800 UTC on November 29, a 24 km (15 mi) wide eye formed over the storm's center and its central pressure had fallen to 982 mbar (hPa; 29.00 inHg), as measured by a United States Navy weather reconnaissance aircraft. Within 24 hours of this it attained winds in excess of 185 km/h (115 mph), ranking it as a Category 3-equivalent typhoon on the modern-day Saffir–Simpson hurricane wind scale. During the intensification process, its forward speed greatly increased to 32 km/h (20 mph). At 0300 UTC on November 30, the eye of Ophelia passed directly over the small atoll of Ulithi in the Caroline Islands; Ulithi Atoll was the only island or land mass over which the eye of the storm passed while warnings were being issued. Sustained winds there reached 230 km/h (140 mph) while a barometer measured a minimum atmospheric pressure of 939.4 mbar (hPa; 27.744 inHg). Thereafter, Ophelia acquired a more northerly component to its track.

The typhoon attained winds of 250 km/h (160 mph) while situated roughly halfway between the Philippines and the Mariana Islands at 0600 UTC on December 1. Later that day the storm had turned due north and weakened slightly. Maintaining an intensity between 220 and 230 km/h (140 and 140 mph), Ophelia traveled north toward Japan for two days. around 0600 UTC on December 2, reconnaissance measured a pressure of 928 mb (hPa; 27.41 inHg) within the now 40 km (25 mi) wide eye of Ophelia. The Japan Meteorological Agency estimated the pressure to have been slightly lower, reporting a minimum of 925 mb (hPa; 27.32 inHg). Additionally, the China Meteorological Administration assessed Ophelia to have been a stronger system, with winds of 270 km/h (170 mph). On December 4, strong upper-level westerlies forced the typhoon northeast and prompted dramatic acceleration. The typhoon's eye soon dissolved as the cyclone's structure waned. Moving at an exceptionally fast 98 km/h (61 mph), with a maximum forward speed of 120 km/h (75 mph), Ophelia began transitioning into an extratropical cyclone on December 5 and completed the transition on the following day, as winds dropped below typhoon-force. The briskly moving system crossed the International Date Line later on December 6, along an easterly track before turning north on December 8, south of Alaska. The system subsequently dissipated over the Gulf of Alaska on December 10.

Throughout its tropical phase, Ophelia tracked along a path roughly 8,050 km (5,000 mi) long.

== Impact ==
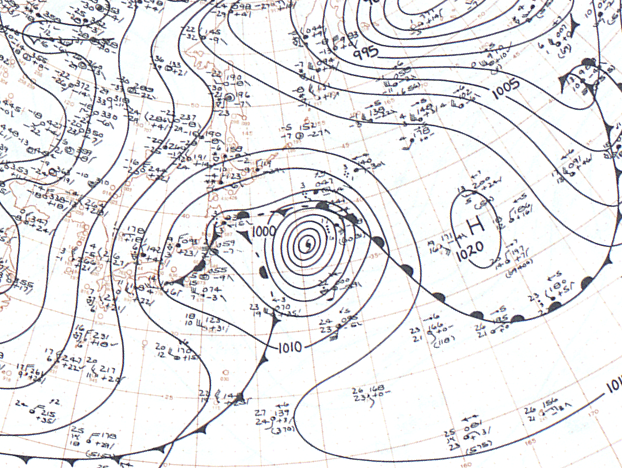
Surface weather analysis of Typhoon Ophelia to the east of Japan on December 5 as it began transitioning into an extratropical cyclone

On November 30, Guam residents were given the all-clear after previously expecting potential impacts from the typhoon, as the storm remained south of the island. Ships in the area were warned to avoid the system, however. The Japanese Maritime Safety Agency reported that two vessels were "in trouble" due to the storm on December 1. A 200-ton ship was driven off-course and collided with a coral reef. Of the 17 crew, 5 were killed in the incident while the other 12 were later rescued by the United States Navy on December 4 and brought to Midway Island. Winds up to 140 km/h (87 mph) were reported on Yap; however, the storm's effects there are unknown. On December 2, storm warnings were raised for the Philippines as Ophelia was forecast to track toward the nation; however following the storm's northward turn these advisories were discontinued the following day. The weakening typhoon later bypassed Japan well to the southeast on December 4. Its outer bands brought heavy rain and snow. Sustained winds in Tokyo Bay reached 47 km/h (29 mph) and gusted to 65 km/h (40 mph).

In the wake of the storm, the name Ophelia was retired from usage. For unknown reasons it was not replaced with any particular name, making it one of two storms in the basin to not have a replacement, although Ora took Ophelia's place in 1963. The reason behind Ophelia's removal is unique among Pacific typhoons. Normally, names are stricken from usage due to loss of life and/or damage; however, Ophelia was deemed meteorologically significant for its long track and significant intensity for a prolonged duration.

=== Ulithi ===
On December 1, the eye of Typhoon Ophelia passed directly over the small atoll of Ulithi, which has a total land area of 4.6 km^{2} (1.8 sq mi). The atoll comprises multiple islands, the largest islet being no more than 1.6 km (0.99 mi) long and even shorter width-wise. It was regarded as the worst storm to hit the atoll since 1907 when similarly violent typhoon devastated the area. At the time of the storm, an estimated 450 people lived on the island and 16 members of the United States Coast Guard were stationed there. Residents and coast guard members were first alerted of the storm on November 21 when it was near Enewetak Atoll; however no action was taken. It was not until November 28 when Ophelia began intensifying that precautions were taken. By this time, winds had already begun increasing and the commanding officer ordered that all equipment, personal gear, and emergency rations were to be taken into a concrete shelter. Natives were not entirely prepared for the typhoon, with two villages receiving no word of its approach. Three villages that were informed were not given the necessary urgency of the typhoon and did not expect the severity of damage the occurred. A Trust Territory vessel, the MV Errol, was anchored in the lagoon but left without warning nearby natives on November 29.

Striking as a Category 4-equivalent typhoon, Ophelia produced devastating winds across the atoll. Winds estimated at 260 km/h (160 mph) battered Ulithi, reportedly destroying every structure except for the concrete coast guard station. The station itself was badly affected, however, with its walls damaged and windows blown out. Nearby Falalop Airfield had 91 m (299 ft) of its runway swept away. An anemometer on the coast guard station measured a peak velocity of 137 km/h (85 mph); however, later analysis of the device revealed that it was broken and revolving slower than it should. It is estimated that winds were most likely on the order of 230 to 250 km/h (140 to 160 mph). Most structures across Ulithi were constructed after World War II and had tin roofs. Natives sought refuge in these structures and in many instances were forced to abandon them as they fell apart during the storm.

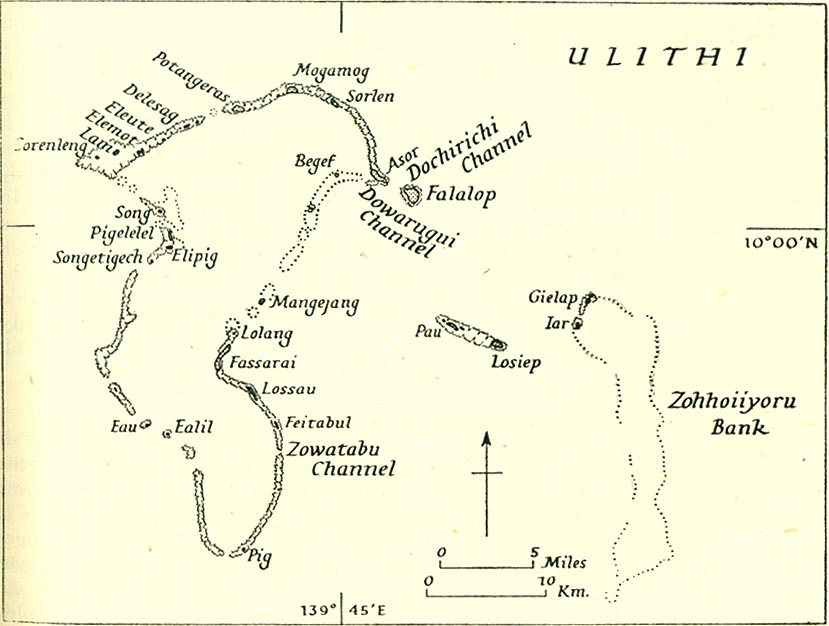
A map of Ulithi Atoll

On Falalop Island, the seawall erected during World War II was entirely destroyed and allowed storm surge to inundate the island; however, at no point was the entire island under water. Initially, Falalop was left under 1.2 m (3.9 ft) of water, though by the time the eye moved over this had decreased to 0.6 m (2.0 ft). Along the south shore, waves reached 1.8 m (5.9 ft) and caused moderate beach erosion. Sand from the coastline was found up to 215 m (705 ft) inland, filling many taro pits in the island's interior. Along the south shore, two children were killed when their home collapsed, pinning them underneath debris, and water later inundated the area and drowned them. Elsewhere on the island, three people sustained minor injuries. Asor Island experienced most of its flooding as the backside of Ophelia moved through. The island was shortened by 45 m (148 ft) to the north and southern beaches experienced varying degrees of erosion. Mogmog Island, located at the northern end of the atoll's lagoon, saw the deposition of large boulders and cobblestone along its north shore which covered an area 30 to 45 m (98 to 148 ft) wide. Flying debris resulted in one injury on both Asor and Mogmog. To the west, Potangeras Island saw an increase in land area by 60 m (200 ft) as sand was pushed from other areas.

Across Ulithi, 29 homes were destroyed, 64 were damaged, and the remaining 33 were intact. Of the 79 non-residential structures, only 4 were left standing. All four schools and medical buildings were destroyed, with nearly all medical supplies being washed away. Agriculture saw extensive losses with nearly the entire taro crop devastated and more than 75% of the food crop was ruined. Roughly 23% of the coconut trees were destroyed and 45% were damaged. It took approximately two years for the coconut crop to return to normal. Banana and breadfruit trees were temporarily useless, though they were in recoverable statuses.

== Aftermath ==
In the months and years after the typhoon, natives in Ulithi were examined for increased levels of stress. Unexpectedly, only a handful of people reported symptoms of posttraumatic stress disorder, with the majority seemingly unfazed by Ophelia. There was some talk among residents of leaving Ulithi and moving to nearby islands such as Yap, Palau, Saipan, or even the Philippines; however, mentions of this diminished relatively quickly. The devastation to the island's infrastructure hastened a previously gradual change in buildings. Reconstruction efforts had entirely abandoned traditional Ulithi building styles in favor of more modern ones. The survival of concrete buildings prompted an overall desire among people to construct all buildings with concrete. Alongside the infrastructural overhaul, a shift in dietary changes to a more western style occurred.

Further social changes brought about by the presence of American military personnel were exemplified in the storm's wake. The use of currency as a means for obtaining goods was first seen in Ulithi in 1956, four years before the typhoon. However, despite the total destruction of markets by Ophelia they were quickly rebuilt, depicting the quick entrenchment of currency in native culture. The reconstruction also accelerated a desire for new goods from trading. Store owners requested a wider range of material to have in stock than seen previously. From a societal standpoint, Ophelia prompted great advances in the Ulithian culture. Women, previously limited to agriculture, housework, and eventually shopping, were found to be doing heavy work (i.e. carpentry, chopping, digging, and lifting) in the immediate wake of the typhoon. A shift in government took place as well, with authority of King Malefich waning to greater power among younger individuals. Malefich also displayed great ineptitude during the storm and was subsequently disposed of as King following Ophelia's passage. The changes in authority occurred due to spontaneous leadership during the storm by the younger persons in order to protect others. Prior to the typhoon, younger members of tribes never spoke during council meetings; however, by 1961 they made their presence known in such meetings.

== See also ==
- List of retired Pacific typhoon names
- Typhoon Rita (1972)
- Typhoon Wayne (1986)
- Hurricane John (1994)
- Hurricane Ioke
