= Tropical Storm Kujira (2015) =

2015 Pacific tropical storm

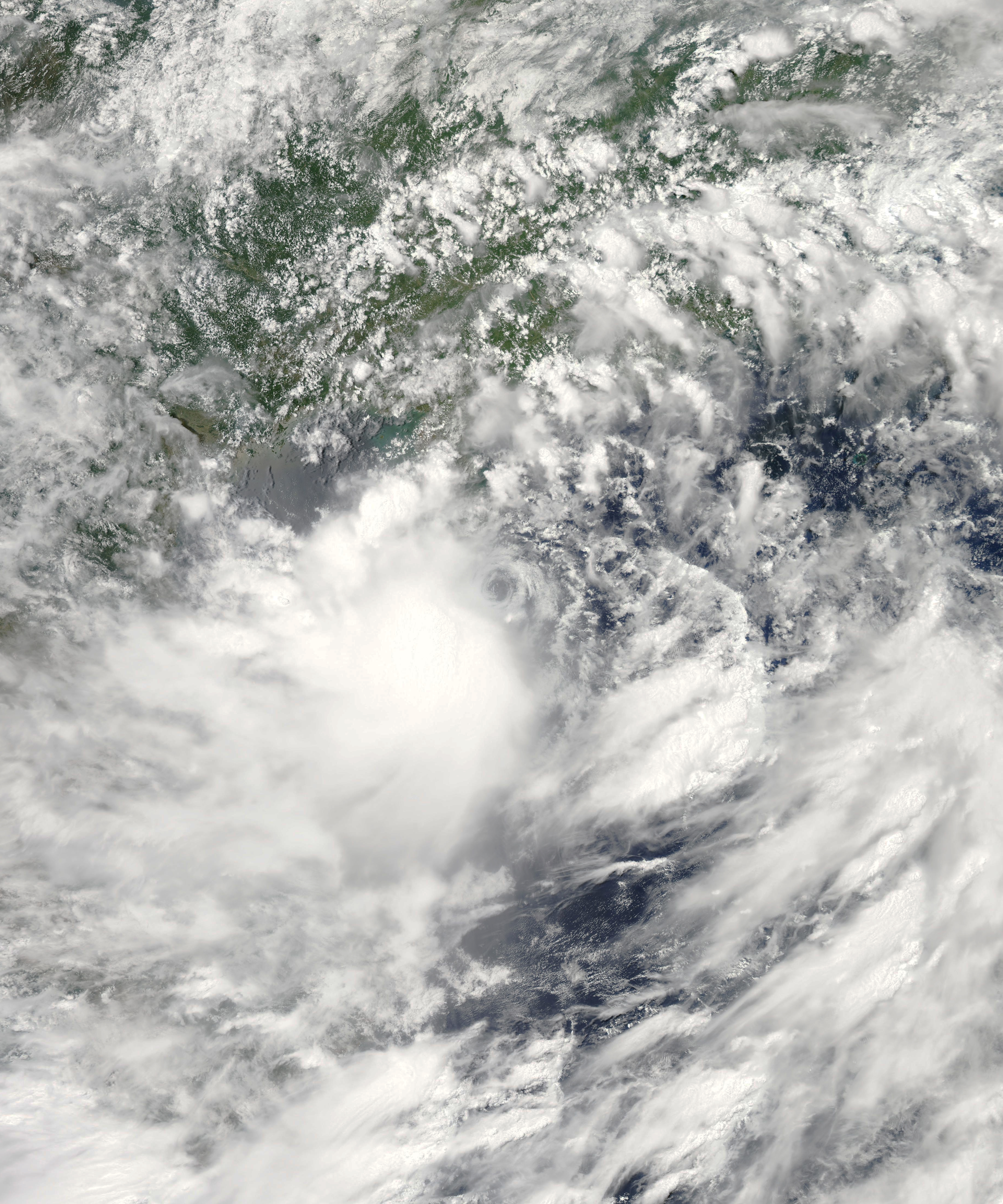
- Tropical Storm Kujira at peak intensity on June 22

Meteorological history
- Formed: June 19, 2015
- Remnant low: June 24, 2015
- Dissipated: June 25, 2015

Tropical storm
- 10-minute sustained (JMA)
- Highest winds: 85 km/h (50 mph)
- Lowest pressure: 985 hPa (mbar); 29.09 inHg

Tropical storm
- 1-minute sustained (SSHWS/JTWC)
- Highest winds: 95 km/h (60 mph)
- Lowest pressure: 985 hPa (mbar); 29.09 inHg

Overall effects
- Fatalities: 14 total
- Damage: $31.3 million (2015 USD)
- Areas affected: Vietnam, China
- IBTrACS
- Part of the 2015 Pacific typhoon season

Tropical Storm Kujira (Note: The name Kujira (Japanese: クジラ, [kɯ̟ʑiɾa̠]) was contributed by Japan and refers to the constellation Cetus, the whale, in Japanese.) was a tropical cyclone that prompted the PAGASA to declare the beginning of the rainy season in the Philippines. The ninth tropical depression, 8th named storm, and first storm to make landfall on China in the 2015 Pacific typhoon season, it formed as a tropical depression south of the Paracel Islands on June 19.

Kujira caused 9 deaths in Vietnam due to flash flooding.

== Meteorological history ==
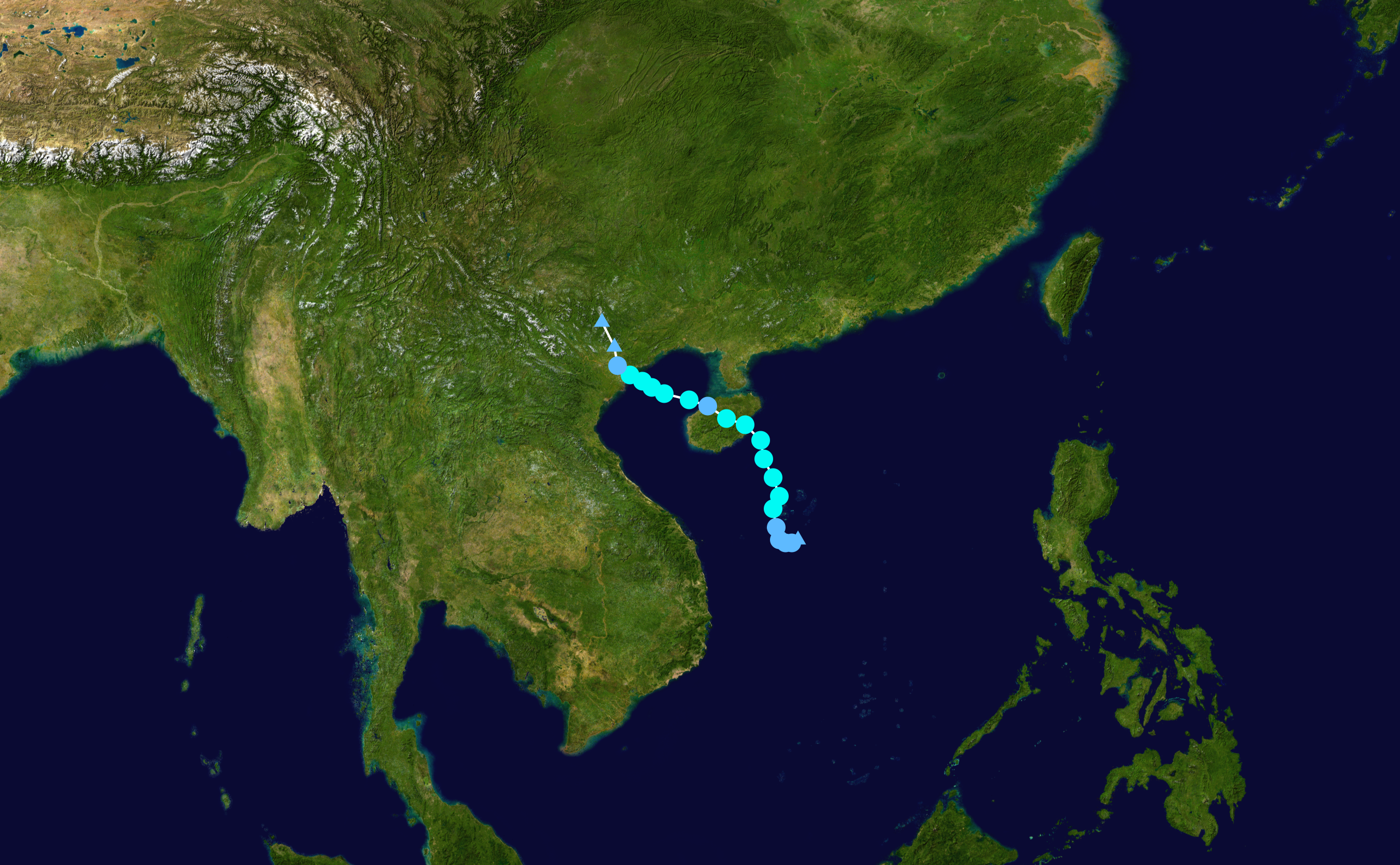
Map plotting the storm's track and intensity, according to the Saffir–Simpson scale Map key Saffir–Simpson scale Tropical depression (≤38 mph, ≤62 km/h) Tropical storm (39–73 mph, 63–118 km/h) Category 1 (74–95 mph, 119–153 km/h) Category 2 (96–110 mph, 154–177 km/h) Category 3 (111–129 mph, 178–208 km/h) Category 4 (130–156 mph, 209–251 km/h) Category 5 (≥157 mph, ≥252 km/h) Unknown Storm type Tropical cyclone Subtropical cyclone Extratropical cyclone, remnant low, tropical disturbance, or monsoon depression

On June 15 at 20:00 UTC, the Joint Typhoon Warning Center (JTWC) began monitoring an area of convection that was located approximately 385 nautical miles (715 km; 445 mi) east-southeast of Huế, with the JTWC assessing the tropical cyclone development potential within the next day as low. The disorganized system was located within favorable conditions for development, with sea surface temperatures in the area ranging from 30–31 °C (86–88 °F). The system began to organize, and on the next day at 06:00 UTC, the JTWC upgraded its development potential within the next day to medium. At 18:00 UTC, the Japan Meteorological Agency (JMA) began issuing warnings on a tropical depression that had formed to the south of the Paracel Islands. (Note: The Japan Meteorological Agency is the official Regional Specialized Meteorological Centre for the western Pacific Ocean.)

On June 20 at 03:00 UTC, the JTWC issued a Tropical Cyclone Formation Alert on the system. Convection continued to deepen over the low-level circulation, and at 15:00 UTC, the JTWC upgraded the system to a tropical depression as it was located approximately 178 nautical miles (330 km; 205 mi) east-southeast of Da Nang, giving it the unofficial designation 08W. On June 21 at 00:00 UTC, the JMA upgraded the depression to a tropical storm, assigning it the name Kujira. The convection became sheared to the southwest of the low-level circulation, and on June 22 at 03:00 UTC, the JTWC upgraded Kujira to a tropical storm. At 12:00 UTC, Kujira peaked in intensity, with maximum sustained winds of 50 mph (85 km/h) and a minimum central pressure of 985 hPa (mbar; 29.09 inHg) as it made landfall on Hainan. (Note: All winds are in ten-minute sustained standards, as per the Japan Meteorological Agency, unless otherwise stated.) The JTWC briefly downgraded Kujira to a tropical depression as it entered the Gulf of Tonkin on June 23 at 03:00 UTC. Kujira briefly re-intensified before making its final landfall on north Vietnam on June 24 at 03:40 UTC; the JTWC issued its final warning on Kujira at 03:00 UTC. The JMA issued its final warning on Kujira at 18:00 UTC, dissipating 12 hours later.

== Preparations and impact ==
=== Vietnam ===
22 thousand ships were notified of the presence of Kujira on June 21. 31 thousand personnel and over 1 thousand vehicles were mobilized to assist in emergencies. Flash floods killed 14 people, eight of which occurred in Sơn La Province, where rainfall of 280 millimetres (11 in) was recorded. 15 people were injured and 382 houses were submerged, with another seventy being destroyed. 600 hectares of crops were inundated, and 12 bridges and several vehicles were swept away. Landslides throughout the areas affected cut off several sections of highways and roads. In Cua Ong, a peak gust of 26 metres per second (94 km/h; 58 mph) was recorded, and on Bạch Long Vĩ Island, a station recorded a minimum pressure of 984.2 hPa (mbar; 29.06 inHg). 219.9 millimetres (8.66 in) of rain was recorded from June 24–25, with other areas near the coast experiencing heavy rains. Total losses caused by Kujira were about ₫385 billion (US$17.6 million) throughout the country. (Note: Currencies are converted to US Dollars using XE Currency Converter.) (Note: All currencies are in their 2015 values unless otherwise noted.)

=== China ===
Rainfall from Kujira eased the worst drought in Hainan since 1959. 40 thousand people were evacuated, and 162 flights were cancelled in Haikou Meilan International Airport and in Sanya Phoenix International Airport, which affected 11 thousand passengers. Heavy rainfall and gale-force winds affected Hainan, with high-speed trains between Haikou and Sanya being suspended. 40 thousand people were displaced and 20 thousand fishing boats returned to harbors, and elementary and middle schools in Haikou were suspended. Hainan and Guangxi received between 250–392 millimetres (9.8–15.4 in) of rainfall. In Dongfang, Hainan, rainfall of 312 millimetres (12.3 in) was reported. 159 thousand people were affected, and ¥85 million (US$13.69 million) in economic losses was incurred.

=== Hong Kong ===
On June 21 at 13:40 UTC, a Signal No. 1 warning was issued for Hong Kong, before being cancelled on the next day at 23:40 UTC. A gust of 67 kilometres per hour (42 mph) was recorded on Waglan Island. HK$1,570 (US$202) in damages were recorded in Hong Kong.

=== Elsewhere ===
Kujira enhanced the southwest monsoon in the Philippines, prompting the PAGASA to declare the beginning of the rainy season. Fishermen were warned of gale conditions in the Andaman Sea and in the Gulf of Thailand. Northeast Thailand experienced precipitation. Rainfall associated with Kujira brought flooding to parts of Myanmar.

== See also ==
- Weather of 2015
- Tropical cyclones in 2015
- Other tropical cyclones named Kujira
- Tropical Storm Lionrock (2021) – took a similar path in October 2021
