= Typhoon Noru (2017) =

Pacific typhoon in 2017

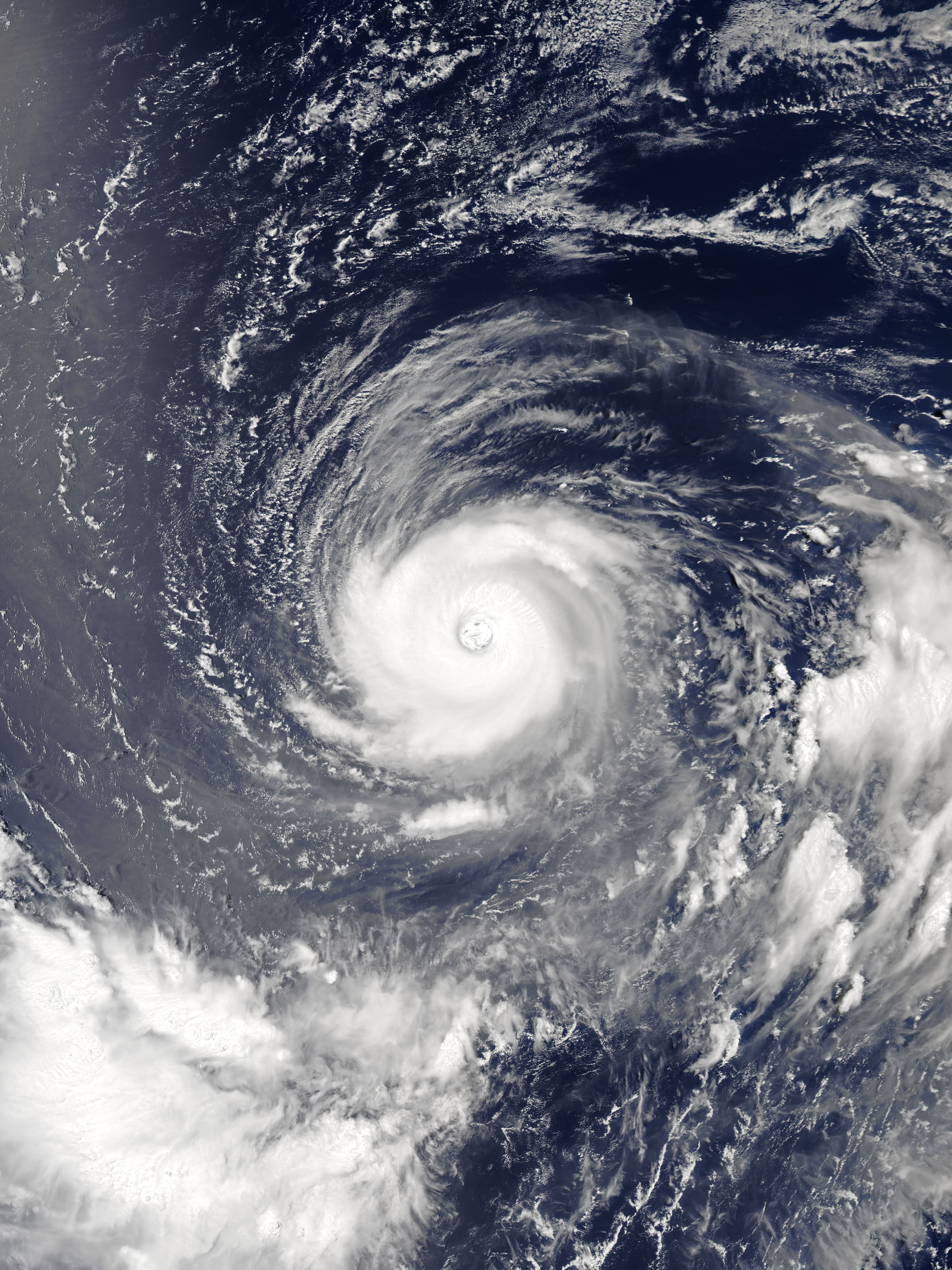
- Noru at peak intensity south of Iwo Jima on July 31

Meteorological history
- Formed: July 19, 2017
- Extratropical: August 8, 2017
- Dissipated: August 9, 2017
- Duration: 2 weeks and 6 days

Very strong typhoon
- 10-minute sustained (JMA)
- Highest winds: 175 km/h (110 mph)
- Lowest pressure: 935 hPa (mbar); 27.61 inHg

Category 4-equivalent super typhoon
- 1-minute sustained (SSHWS/JTWC)
- Highest winds: 250 km/h (155 mph)
- Lowest pressure: 922 hPa (mbar); 27.23 inHg

Overall effects
- Fatalities: 2
- Damage: $100 million (2017 USD)
- Areas affected: Japan
- IBTrACS
- Part of the 2017 Pacific typhoon season

Typhoon Noru (Note: The name Noru (Korean: 노루, [no̞ɾu]) was contributed by South Korea and refers to the Siberian roe deer (Capreolus pygargus) in Korean.) was the second-longest-lasting tropical cyclone of the Northwest Pacific Ocean on record—behind only 1986's Wayne and tied with 1972's Rita—and the second-most-intense tropical cyclone of the basin in 2017, tied with Talim, just behind Lan. (Note: The Japan Meteorological Agency (JMA) officially defines the duration as the period of the tropical storm intensity or higher. Should a tropical storm weakens into a tropical depression and intensifies into a tropical storm again, the TD period will be included.) Forming as the fifth named storm of the annual typhoon season on July 20, Noru further intensified into the first typhoon of the year on July 23. However, Noru began to interact with nearby Tropical Storm Kulap on July 24, executing a counterclockwise loop southeast of Japan. Weakening to a severe tropical storm on July 28, Noru began to restrengthen as it turned sharply to the west on July 30. Amid favorable conditions, Noru rapidly intensified into the season's first super typhoon, and reached peak intensity with annular characteristics on July 31. In early August, Noru underwent a gradual weakening trend while curving northwestwards and then northwards. After stalling off the Satsunan Islands weakening to a severe tropical storm again on August 5, the system began to accelerate northeastwards towards the Kansai region of Japan, making landfall in Wakayama Prefecture on August 7. Noru became extratropical over the Sea of Japan on August 8, and dissipated one day later.

Noru was responsible for two deaths in Kagoshima Prefecture, and at least $100 million (2017 USD) in damages in Japan.

== Meteorological history ==
=== Origins ===
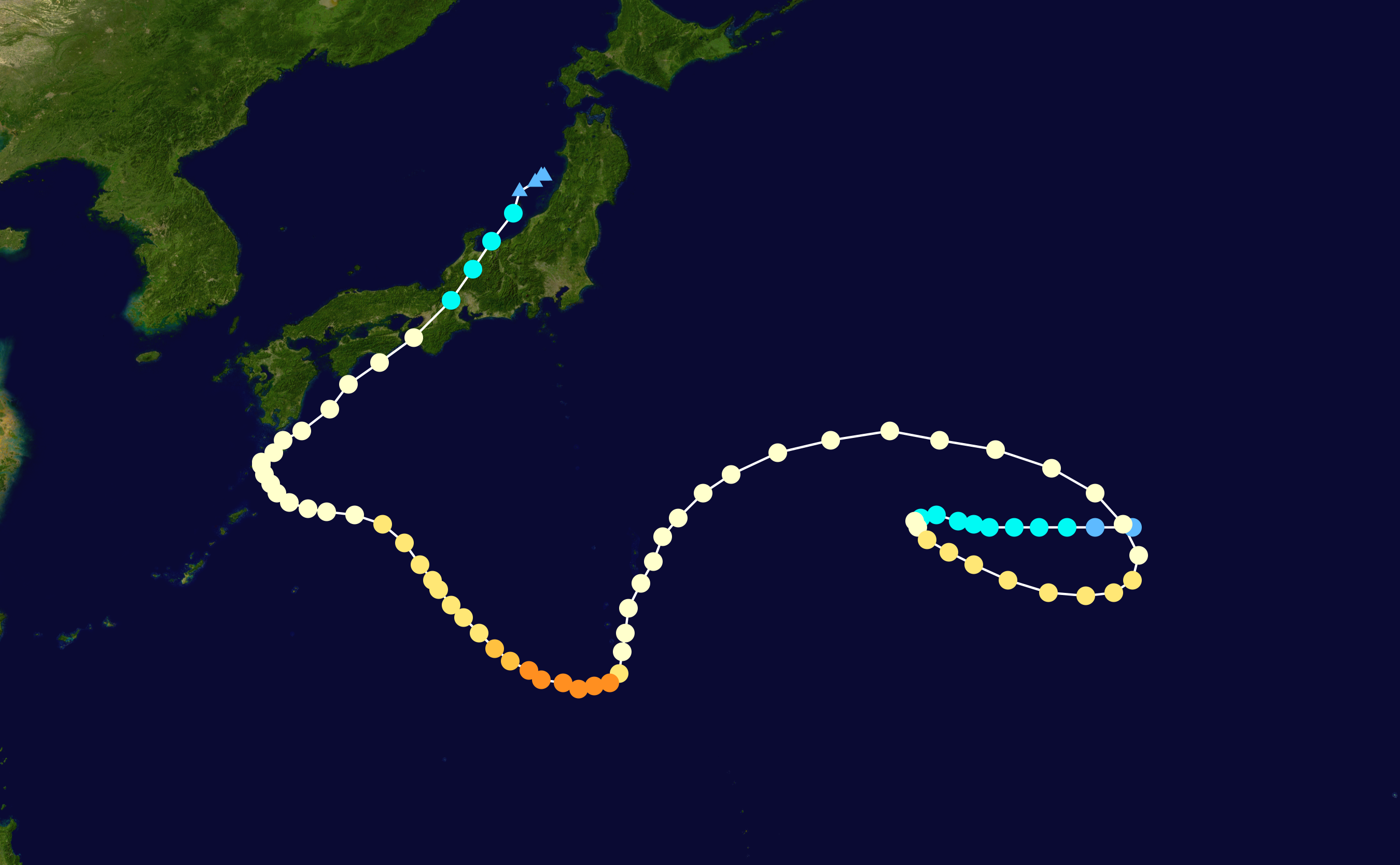
Map plotting the storm's track and intensity, according to the Saffir–Simpson scale Map key Saffir–Simpson scale Tropical depression (≤38 mph, ≤62 km/h) Tropical storm (39–73 mph, 63–118 km/h) Category 1 (74–95 mph, 119–153 km/h) Category 2 (96–110 mph, 154–177 km/h) Category 3 (111–129 mph, 178–208 km/h) Category 4 (130–156 mph, 209–251 km/h) Category 5 (≥157 mph, ≥252 km/h) Unknown Storm type Tropical cyclone Subtropical cyclone Extratropical cyclone, remnant low, tropical disturbance, or monsoon depression

A non-tropical low formed about 700 km (430 mi) north-northwest of Wake Island at around 00:00 UTC on July 18, 2017, which transitioned into a tropical depression about one day later. In the afternoon of July 19, the Japan Meteorological Agency (JMA) began issuing tropical cyclone warnings on the system, expecting a tropical storm within 24 hours. Although outflow was weak for the partially organized system at that time, low vertical wind shear and sea surface temperature (SST) at 29 °C were conducive to development. Originally retaining some subtropical characteristics, it began transitioning into a fully tropical and warm-core system; therefore, the Joint Typhoon Warning Center (JTWC) issued a Tropical Cyclone Formation Alert to the system early on July 20, when fragmented deep convective bands had wrapped around its broad low-level circulation center (LLCC). A point source positioned over the center also improved outflow aloft. At 12:00 UTC, the system intensified into the fifth Northwest Pacific tropical storm of 2017, which was assigned the international name Noru half a day later by the JMA operationally. Besides, the JTWC upgraded the system to a tropical depression at 21:00 UTC. 12 hours later, the JTWC upgraded Noru to a tropical storm, despite its partially exposed LLCC; at the same time, it started tracking westward along the southwest periphery of the subtropical ridge (STR) positioned to the northeast.

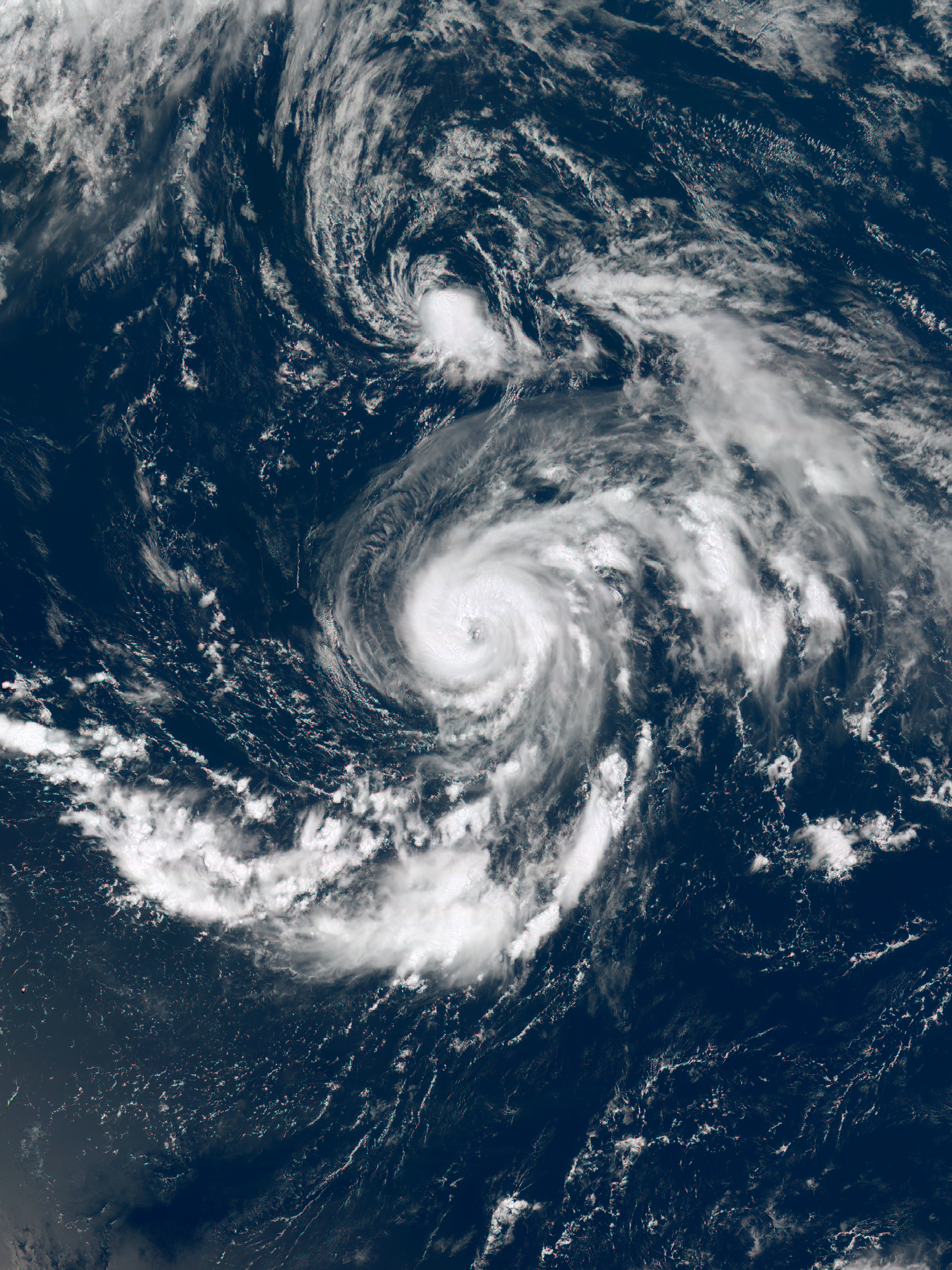
Typhoon Noru (south) and Tropical Storm Kulap (north) undergoing Fujiwhara interaction on July 25

Noru struggled to intensify significantly for two days owing to relatively low ocean heat content values and its asymmetric structure, until it developed into a severe tropical storm at around 18:00 UTC on July 22. Subsequently, Noru slowed down and remained stationary, due to a complex steering environment consisting of ridging on three sides. The steering flow also transitioned from a subtropical ridging to the west to a near equatorial ridge to the south of the system. Noru rapidly intensified into the first typhoon of 2017 around 12:00 UTC on July 23, marking the latest occurrence of the first typhoon since 1998. It featured a 20 km (12 mi) diameter pinhole eye that embedded in an extremely compact core located about 900 km (560 mi) east of the Bonin Islands, thanks to moderate eastward outflow, anomalously warm SSTs and low vertical wind shear. After that, the eye repeatedly reappeared and filled due to increasing vertical wind shear offset by improving poleward outflow into the upper-low associated with Tropical Storm Kulap. Noru also started to track east-southeastward under the steering influence of a near equatorial ridge to the south.

=== Interaction with Kulap ===
On July 24, a Fujiwhara interaction between Noru and Kulap started. As a result, Kulap became directly located to the north of Noru early on July 25, and this situation allowed cold dry air to intrude along the western and southern periphery of the typhoon, making Noru weaken slightly with the significantly shallower convective core. The primary steering influence for Noru was still a near equatorial ridge to the south, but another ridge was also building in to the east, turning Noru northeastward and then northward. Although vertical wind shear relaxed somewhat with the robust eastward outflow channel on July 26, the reduction of mid-level relative humidity and slightly depressed SSTs at 26 °C to 27 °C tempered intensification and even eroded the convective structure. Having finished a cyclonic loop and tracking west-northwestward along the southern periphery of a deep-layered ridge to the northeast, Noru showed some signs of transitioning to a hybrid system, with an upper-level low nearby and a thermal structure more indicative of a subtropical storm. However, Noru reformed a 35 km (22 mi) diameter eye late on the same day, and while dry air was still entrenched across the southern portion of the typhoon, the extent of the dry air had shrunk and the moisture envelope was expanding, forming a hospitable cocoon for the system to reside in.

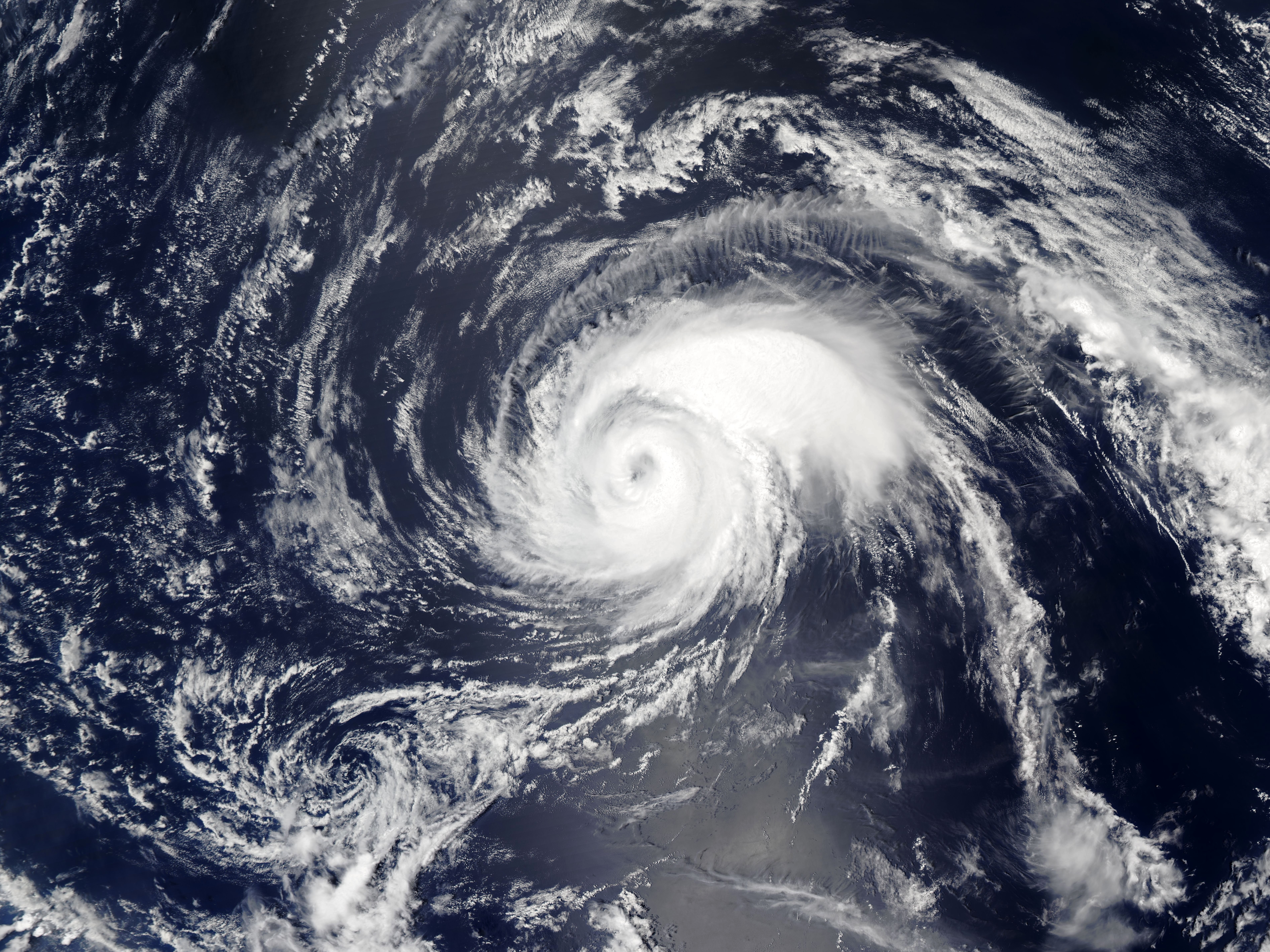
Typhoon Noru absorbing the remnants of Tropical Storm Kulap on July 27

On July 27, Noru began to track westward along the southern periphery of a deep-layered ridge to the northeast. The upper-level environment was extremely complex, with a tropical upper tropospheric trough (TUTT) cell having developed just to the southwest, another upper-level low to the southeast and an induced anticyclone just to the south and extending over Noru. The aforementioned TUTT cell to the southwest was also providing a weak source of outflow. Moreover, the combination of the complex upper-level outflow and low vertical wind shear was helping Noru to maintain intensity. At around 00:00 UTC on July 28, Noru slightly weakened into a severe tropical storm when approaching the Bonin Islands. Dry air completely surrounded the system with weak convection wrapping around a ragged eye; moreover, vertical wind shear was high, but the shear vector was in general alignment with the storm motion, with resultant relative shear values in the low to moderate range. At the same time, the steering flow transitioned to the subtropical ridge centered over the East China Sea, causing Noru to track southwestward along the eastern boundary of this STR. Despite warmer SSTs at 28 °C to 29 °C which supported intensification for Noru in the area, the complex upper-level environment with a TUTT cell to the southeast and a ridge far to the north combining limit outflow, while dry air continued enveloping the typhoon and isolating it from any significant moisture.

=== Re-intensification and peak intensity ===
Noru reformed an eye at around 09:00 JST (00:00 UTC) on July 29 while situated 70 km (43 mi) to the east of Chichijima, the largest Ogasawara island. Based on the observations from Iwo To, the JTWC downgraded Noru to a tropical storm at around 18:00 UTC, at which time the system was tracking directly southward along the eastern periphery of an extension of the STR positioned to the west. Early on July 30, Noru began to improve its convective structure, making both of the JMA and the JTWC upgrade Noru to a typhoon again. Over the following 24 hours, Noru rapidly intensified, and the JTWC reported that it had become a Category 4 super typhoon about 225 km (140 mi) south of Iwo To at around 18:00 UTC, with one-minute sustained winds at 250 km/h (160 mph), though operationally it was put at Category 5 strength with winds at 260 km/h (160 mph). The typhoon took on annular characteristics, with a symmetric ring of deep convection surrounding a 30 km (19 mi) well-defined eye and fairly uniform cloud top temperatures. Environmental conditions were favorable with radial outflow, enhanced by a poleward outflow channel into the TUTT and a subtropical jet to the east-northeast. Noru's previous southward motion also led itself to the warmer area with SSTs at 29 °C to 30 °C, favoring intensification. At this time, Noru began to drift westward within a competing steering environment.

Typhoon Noru slowly weakening with annular features south of Japan on August 2

On July 31, Noru reached its peak intensity at around 00:00 UTC with ten-minute sustained winds at 175 km/h (109 mph) and the central pressure at 935 hPa (27.61 inHg). It remained an impressively annular system with a clear eye but lacking banding features, yet the JTWC downgraded it to a typhoon in the afternoon because of recently warming cloud tops. Traveling northwestward over an area of low ocean heat content and isolated from well-defined outflow, Noru's gradual weakening trend became more evident early on the next day, which is also indicated by the JMA. A microwave imagery depicted a weakened eyewall, while the eye was temporarily not as clear as before. Since late August 1, Noru presented a 95 km (59 mi) diameter large but ragged eye, yet the convective ring surrounding the eye gradually elongated, especially on the northwestern quadrant; meanwhile, microwave imageries even depicted a break from the northwestern portion of the eyewall. Noru was establishing a poleward outflow channel that tapped into a passing mid-latitude trough located to the north on August 2, and a strong near-equatorial ridge was steering the typhoon towards a weak area in the subtropical ridge to the northwest, being the result of that passing mid-latitude trough.

=== Landfall ===
Infrared satellite loop of Noru passing over the Ōsumi Islands on August 5

The ragged eye of Noru became enormous on August 3, with the diameter about 110 km (68 mi). Despite maintaining a good poleward outflow channel into an upper-level low to the northeast, the mid-latitude trough just to the northwest caused subsidence along the northwest quadrant and offset the favorable conditions including low vertical wind shear and warm SSTs, making deep convective bands shallower more and more. Having tracked westward relatively faster for one day, Noru slowed down again and turned northwestward on August 4, along the southern periphery of a deep-layered subtropical ridge over the Korean Peninsula and western Japan. Deep convection in the northern portion was very shallow early on the same day that prompted the JTWC reporting a partially exposed system. In the afternoon, convective bands re-intensified and surrounded a 70 km (43 mi) eye, yet the JMA radar depicted a much larger eye, with the diameter about 95 to 110 km (59 to 68 mi). On August 5, deep convective banding presented predominantly in the southern semi-circle of Typhoon Noru, owing to strong equatorward outflow and the terrain of Kyushu as well as the Ōsumi Islands. In spite of moderate vertical wind shear, the very warm SSTs at 31 °C of the Kuroshio still helped sustain the strength of Noru. However, the system weakened into a severe tropical storm again about noon when the eye had completely deteriorated, as an extension of the subtropical ridge was suffocating the typhoon on the northern periphery, resulting in the deteriorating poleward outflow channel.

Noru remained almost stationary and looping around Yakushima until it accelerated northeastward off the southeastern coast of Kyushu on August 6, along the western boundary of a deep-layered ridge extension located to the southeast. While the eye was struggling to reform, a strong convective structure started to wrap around a growing ragged eye feature later, over the SSTs at 29 °C. On August 7, Noru passed near Muroto, Kōchi at 10:00 JST (01:00 UTC) on August 7 and made landfall over the northern part of Wakayama Prefecture at 15:30 JST (06:30 UTC). Both of the JMA and the JTWC downgraded Noru to a tropical storm at around 24:00 JST (15:00 UTC), for the weakening system tracked over the Japanese Alps. Noru emerged over the Sea of Japan from Toyama Prefecture at around 05:00 JST on August 8 (20:00 UTC on August 7) and then continued weakening, as deep convection had gradually deteriorated because of the mountainous terrain. Thus, the JTWC downgraded Noru to a tropical depression about five hours later and issued their final warning owing to the poorly defined and disorganized LLCC in the afternoon. Noru subsequently became an extratropical cyclone at around 21:00 JST (12:00 UTC), before the system was declared dissipated by the JMA on August 9.

== Preparation and impact ==
In Japan, hundreds of flights were cancelled ahead of the storm, including 120 flights cancelled at the Kansai International Airport, and 280 flights cancelled originating from All Nippon Airways and Japan Airlines. Thousands of people were moved to evacuation zones. The West Japan Railway Company halted operations in Japan. Six areas were notified for evacuation in fear of landslides, massive floods, and other major concerns. 7,000 people were told to evacuate in the city of Fukui, though the warning was lifted a few hours later. Two Japanese oil refiners halted their shipments because of the storm. Another 9,000 residents were called to evacuate Amami Ōshima as the storm brought high rains to the island.100 other flights were halted in the region.

Heavy rain seen from a car window in Japan.

Because of slow motion, areas found risk of landslides and rainfall. As of August 7, two people had been killed by the passage of Typhoon Noru, both in Kagoshima Prefecture. One man died due to Noru's high winds. The other Noru victim was a fisherman. On August 8, the Sister River in Nagahama, Shiga flooded, covering the surrounded villages. 16 houses and other buildings were flooded, 550 people, including 100 people from a nursing home were evacuated temporarily. 15,000 people lost power in Kagoshima because of high winds. A total of 50 people was injured by the storm. Flooding persisted in multiple areas, mainly the Ane River, which also flooded nearby areas. Big waves crashed at breakwaters in Wakayama, while roof tiles were ripped out in Mie. Many communication outages were reported on Kyushu. Two people were dead, nine were missing, two were seriously injured, and 49 were slightly injured. Two houses were destroyed, 14 houses were seriously damaged, 208 houses were damaged, 48 houses were flooded for about one floor, and 326 houses were flooded below one floor. 426 houses lost water because of the storm while signals were lost in 116 base stations in Japan. Total economic losses in Japan were counted to be US$100 million.

=== Tornado ===
On August 7, 4:30 p.m., a tornado formed. It traveled north for 3 km (1.9 mi) before dissipating. 30 houses were blown, and a truck was overturned. Because of the tornado, three boys were injured.

== Aftermath and records ==
According to the Japan Meteorological Agency, Noru is the fourth longest-lived typhoon in history. They also added that an event like this happens "once in every 50 years".

== See also ==
- Weather of 2017
- Tropical cyclones in 2017
- Typhoon Roke (2011)
- Typhoon Halong (2014)
- Typhoon Lionrock (2016)
- Typhoon Malakas (2016)
- Typhoon Jongdari (2018)
