= List of storms named Chan-hom =

The name Chan-hom (Lao: ຈັນຫອມ, [t͡ɕan˩ hɔːm˩]) has been used for five tropical cyclones in the western North Pacific Ocean. The name was contributed by Laos and refers to a type of fragrant sandalwood (Mansonia gagei) in Lao.

- Typhoon Chan-hom (2003) (T0303, 04W) - strong storm that stayed away from land
- Typhoon Chan-hom (2009) (T0902, 02W, Emong) - formed off Vietnam, reached typhoon status before striking the Philippines
- Typhoon Chan-hom (2015) (T1509, 09W, Falcon) - a large typhoon which affected several countries in Eastern Asia
- Typhoon Chan-hom (2020) (T2014, 16W) - passed close to Japan
- Severe Tropical Storm Chan-hom (2026) (T2615, 14W) - an erratic storm that traversed Japan westwards

Preceded by Kujira	Pacific typhoon season names Chan-hom	Succeeded by Peilou
