= Tropical Storm Chan-hom (2026) =

Tropical cyclone in Japan

Severe Tropical Storm Chan-hom
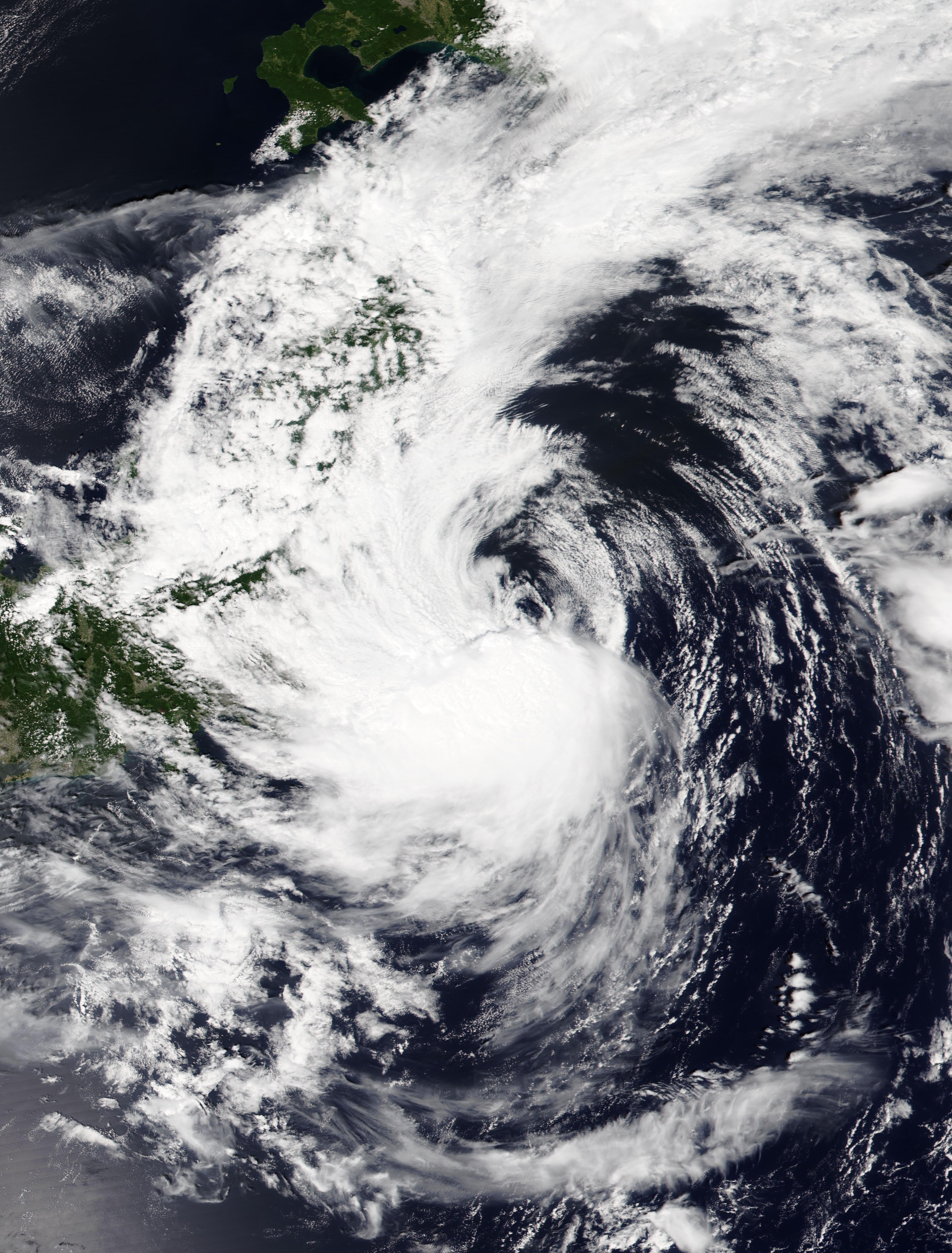
- Chan-hom near peak intensity before making landfall on Honshu

Meteorological history
- Formed: August 5, 2026
- Dissipated: August 15, 2026

Severe tropical storm
- 10-minute sustained (JMA)
- Highest winds: 95 km/h (60 mph)
- Lowest pressure: 980 hPa (mbar); 28.94 inHg

Tropical storm
- 1-minute sustained (SSHWS/JTWC)
- Highest winds: 95 km/h (60 mph)
- Lowest pressure: 976 hPa (mbar); 28.82 inHg

Overall effects
- Injuries: 7
- Damage: Unknown
- Areas affected: Wake Island, Japan (especially Honshu), Korea, Russian Far East
- Part of the 2026 Pacific typhoon season

Severe Tropical Storm Chan-hom (Note: The name Chan-hom (Lao: ຈັນຫອມ, [t͡ɕan˩ hɔːm˩]) was contributed by Laos and refers to a type of fragrant sandalwood (Mansonia gagei).) was an unusual and damaging tropical cyclone that became the first tropical cyclone to make direct landfall in Japan's Ibaraki Prefecture since reliable records began in 1951. The twentieth tropical depression and fifteenth named storm of the 2026 Pacific typhoon season, Chan-hom originated from a disturbance near Wake Island in early August. The Joint Typhoon Warning Center (JTWC) began monitoring the system on August 4, citing a low chance of tropical cyclogenesis in the next 24 hours. Although the JMA upgraded it to a tropical storm later that day and was named Chan-hom, it was classified as a monsoon depression according to the JTWC, with winds of 85 km/h (52 mph), equivalent to a moderate tropical storm.

== Meteorological history ==
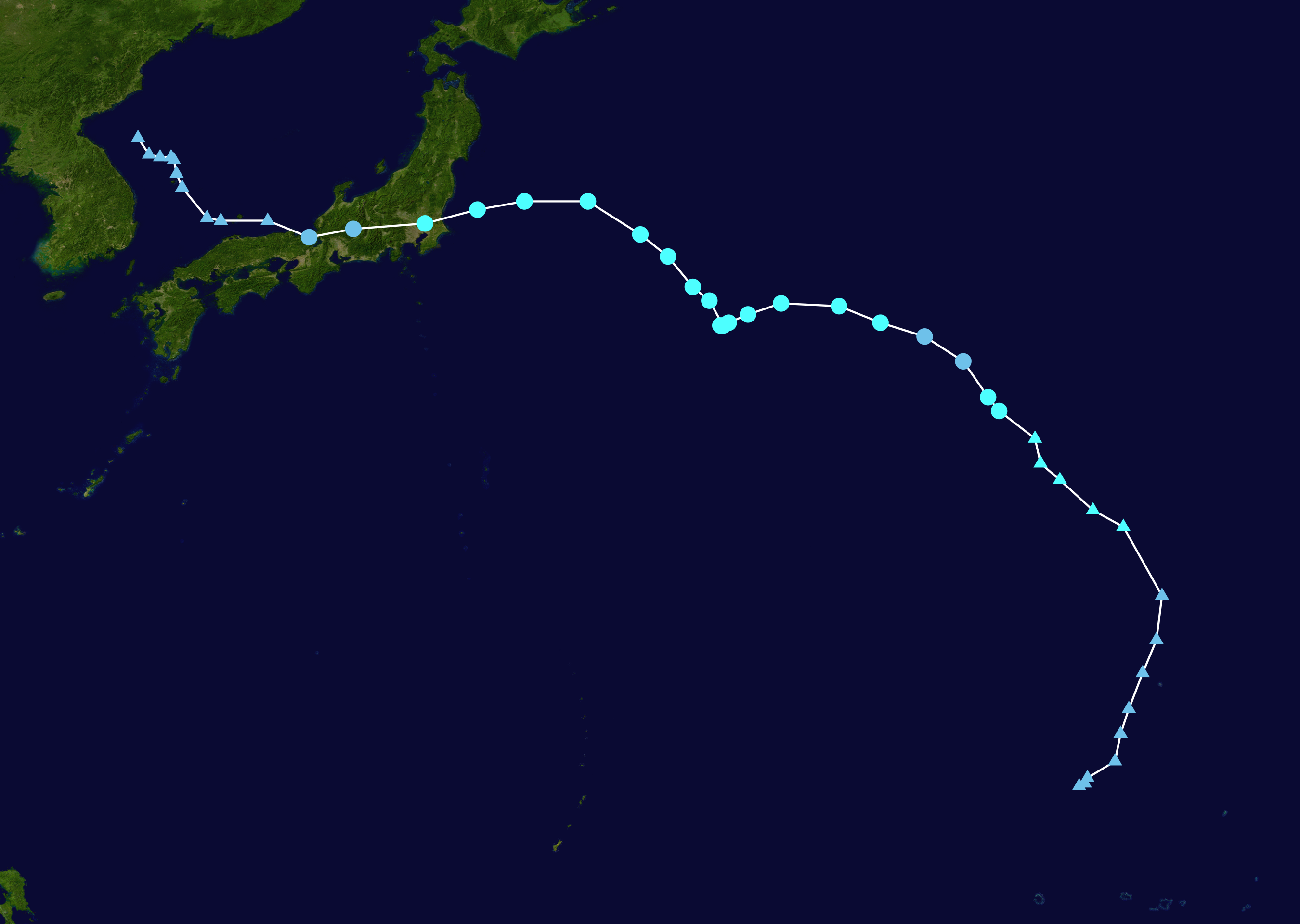
Map plotting the storm's track and intensity, according to the Saffir–Simpson scale Map key Saffir–Simpson scale Tropical depression (≤38 mph, ≤62 km/h) Tropical storm (39–73 mph, 63–118 km/h) Category 1 (74–95 mph, 119–153 km/h) Category 2 (96–110 mph, 154–177 km/h) Category 3 (111–129 mph, 178–208 km/h) Category 4 (130–156 mph, 209–251 km/h) Category 5 (≥157 mph, ≥252 km/h) Unknown Storm type Tropical cyclone Subtropical cyclone Extratropical cyclone, remnant low, tropical disturbance, or monsoon depression

On August 3, the JTWC started tracking a low pressure area, which later the next day, stated it was 134 nautical miles (248 km) south-southeast of Wake Island. The JTWC later classified the system as a monsoon depression. The following morning, the JMA classified the low-pressure as a tropical depression. Later that day at 06:00 UTC, the JMA upgraded the system to a tropical storm, giving it the name Chan-hom. The following day at 09:30 UTC, the JTWC issued a TCFA for the system, stating that Chan-hom developed tropical characteristics. The following day, the JTWC upgraded Chan-hom into a tropical storm, with the system getting the designation 14W. On August 11, JMA further upgraded Chan-hom into a severe tropical storm. A few hours later, it had made landfall Ibaraki Prefecture in Japan, making it the first tropical cyclone to hit Ibaraki Prefecture since 1951 when JMA started keeping records. On August 12, the JMA downgraded the system to a tropical depression as it entered unfavorable conditions, with the JTWC classifying it as a remnant low, which drifted around for the next few days. On August 15, the system officially dissipated near the east coast of the Korean Peninsula.

== Preparations ==
The JMA urged residents in the Tohoku region to remain on high alert for landslides through August 12. They also warned of flooding in low-lying areas, as well as river levels rising or even overflowing.

== Impacts ==
Chan-hom produced strong wind gusts in parts of Japan's Kantō region. Wind gusts in excess of 100 kilometres per hour (62 mph) were observed in Kitaibaraki, Ibaraki. Two women in Ibaraki suffered injuries due to strong winds. A tree was also downed possibly due to the storm near Omote-sandō Station in Tokyo, with no injuries. In total, Chan-hom injured seven people, two men in Iwate Prefecture, four women in Ibaraki Prefecture, and one man in Tochigi Prefecture. Chan-hom left 22,000 homes without power. The weather affected tourists during Obon. 60 flights at Haneda Airport were canceled. A beach in Ōarai was closed.

== See also ==
- Weather of 2026
- Tropical cyclones in 2026
- Other storms of the same name
- Typhoon Jongdari (2018) – took a similar unusual trajectory into Japan
