= Typhoon Jongdari =

Pacific typhoon in 2018

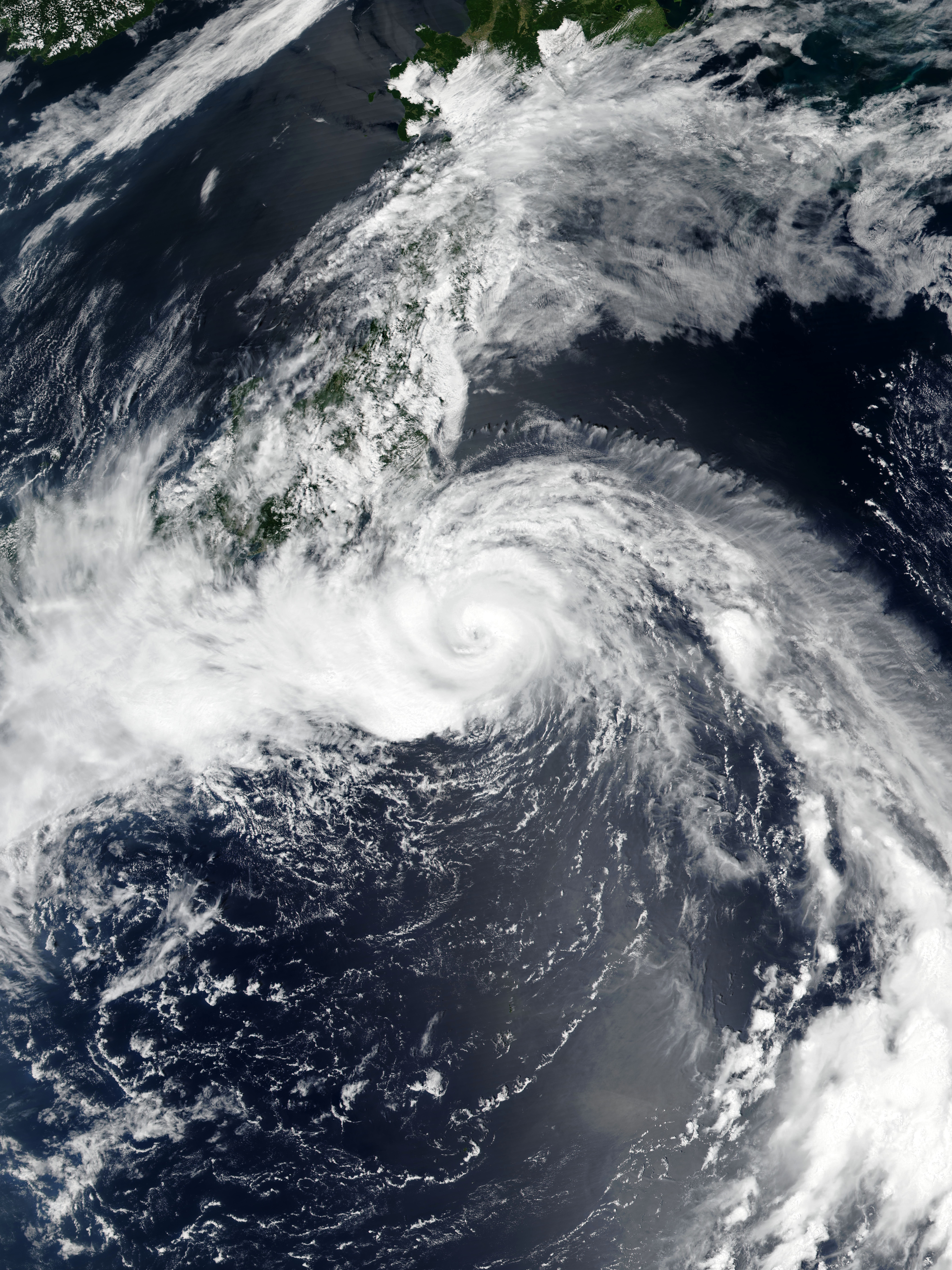
- Jongdari shortly after peak intensity, while approaching Japan on July 28

Meteorological history
- Formed: July 23, 2018
- Dissipated: August 4, 2018

Typhoon
- 10-minute sustained (JMA)
- Highest winds: 140 km/h (85 mph)
- Lowest pressure: 960 hPa (mbar); 28.35 inHg

Category 2-equivalent typhoon
- 1-minute sustained (SSHWS/JTWC)
- Highest winds: 165 km/h (105 mph)
- Lowest pressure: 950 hPa (mbar); 28.05 inHg

Overall effects
- Fatalities: None
- Damage: $1.46 billion (2018 USD)
- Areas affected: Japan, East China
- IBTrACS
- Part of the 2018 Pacific typhoon season

Typhoon Jongdari was a strong, long-lived and erratic tropical cyclone that impacted Japan and East China in late July and early August 2018. Formed as the twelfth named storm of the 2018 typhoon season near Okinotorishima on July 24, Jongdari gradually intensified and developed into the fourth typhoon of the year on July 26. Influenced by an upper-level low and a subtropical ridge, Jongdari executed a rare counter-clockwise southeast of Japan on the next day. At that time, it also reached peak intensity. The typhoon made landfall in Kii Peninsula, over Mie Prefecture of Japan locally early on July 29.

Jongdari is one of the five Pacific tropical cyclones since 1951 that approached Honshu on a westward trajectory; the others were Typhoon Viola in 1966, Tropical Storm Ben in 1983, Typhoon Lionrock in 2016, and Tropical Storm Chan-hom in 2026.

== Meteorological history ==
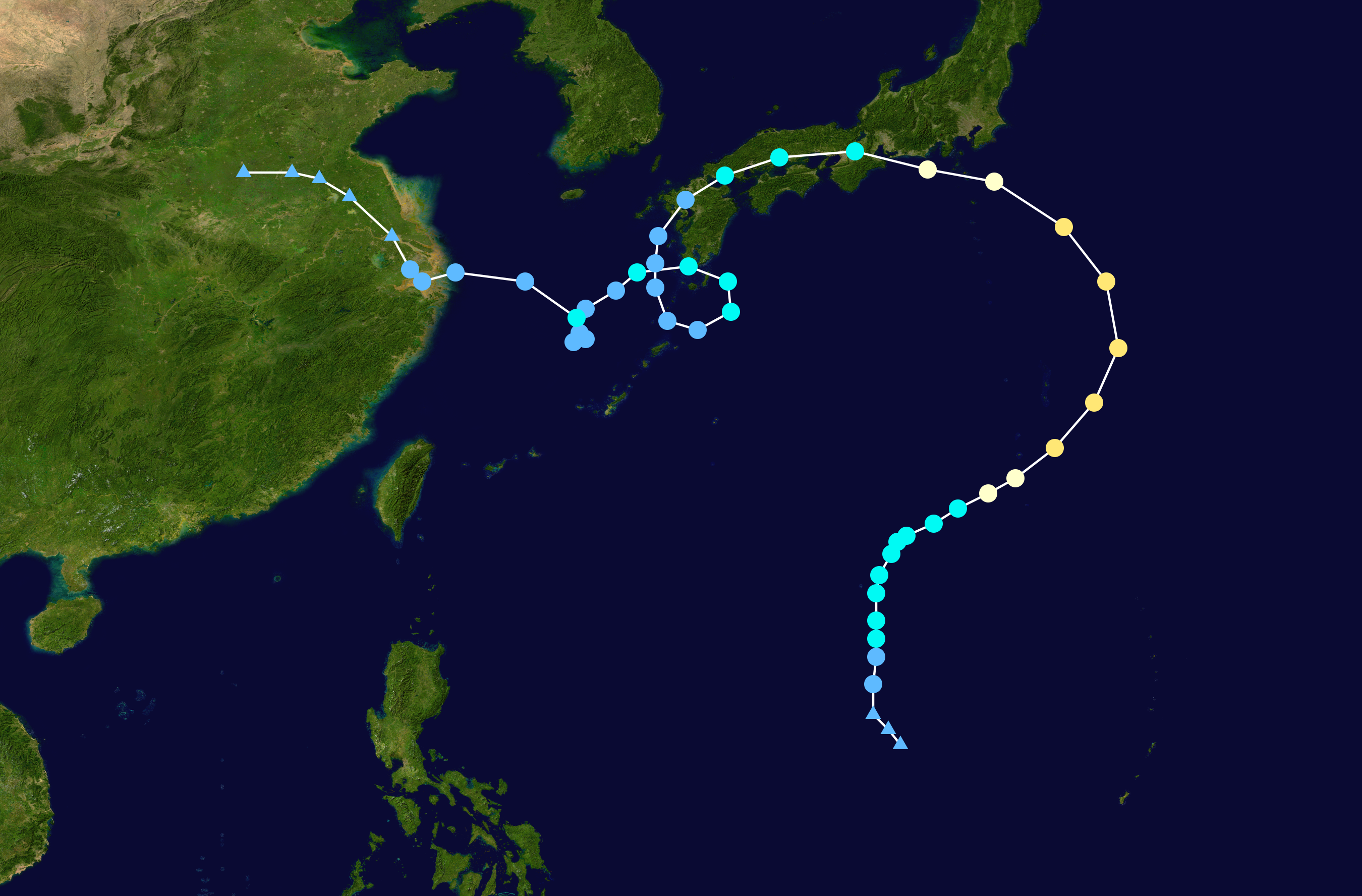
Map plotting the storm's track and intensity, according to the Saffir–Simpson scale Map key Saffir–Simpson scale Tropical depression (≤38 mph, ≤62 km/h) Tropical storm (39–73 mph, 63–118 km/h) Category 1 (74–95 mph, 119–153 km/h) Category 2 (96–110 mph, 154–177 km/h) Category 3 (111–129 mph, 178–208 km/h) Category 4 (130–156 mph, 209–251 km/h) Category 5 (≥157 mph, ≥252 km/h) Unknown Storm type Tropical cyclone Subtropical cyclone Extratropical cyclone, remnant low, tropical disturbance, or monsoon depression

A tropical disturbance formed southeast of Guam on July 19 and tracked westward steadily. After issuing a Tropical Cyclone Formation Alert on July 21, the Joint Typhoon Warning Center (JTWC) upgraded the system to a tropical depression early on July 22, although the location of its low-level circulation center was not clear. The Japan Meteorological Agency (JMA), however, kept reporting it as a low-pressure area until it was upgraded to a tropical depression late on July 23. After the slow consolidation for several days, the system was upgraded to a tropical storm near Okinotorishima at around 18:00 on July 24 by agencies such as JMA and JTWC, with an international name Jongdari. (Note: The name Jongdari (Korean: 종다리, [t͡ɕo̞ŋda̠ɾi]) was contributed by North Korea and refers to the Eurasian skylark (Alauda arvensis) in Korean.) A microwave imagery revealed a low-level forming eyewall next day, indicating a consolidating system. After JMA upgraded Jongdari to a severe tropical storm at noon, the system accelerated northeastward under the influence of a near-equatorial ridge to the south.

On July 26, as Jongdari started to interact with an upper-level cold-core low to the north which significantly enhanced poleward outflow, it intensified to a typhoon in the afternoon despite increasingly unfavorable vertical wind shear. Over the warm sea surface temperatures between 29 and 30 °C (84 and 86 °F) near the Ogasawara Islands, JMA reported that Jongdari had reached peak intensity at 00:00 UTC on July 27, with ten-minute maximum sustained winds of 140 km/h (87 mph), and a minimum central pressure of 965 hPa (28.5 inHg). Although JTWC indicated Jongdari reached peak intensity at 12:00 UTC with one-minute maximum sustained winds of 175 km/h (109 mph), the rugged eye of Jongdari kept periodically visible with an elongated structure due to the further interaction of the upper-level low which had moved to the northwest side of the typhoon. As the steering influence transitioned to a subtropical ridge to the northeast, Jongdari executed a rare counter-clockwise turn to the southeast of Japan.

Jongdari began to be inundated by subsidence on July 28, as the Fujiwhara effect had made the upper-level low move to the west of the typhoon. It also initiated a weakening trend while accelerating northwestward and then westward toward the Japanese island of Honshu. At around 01:00 JST on July 29 (16:00 UTC July 28), Typhoon Jongdari made landfall over Ise, Mie Prefecture with ten-minute maximum sustained winds at 120 km/h (75 mph) and the central pressure at 975 hPa (28.8 inHg). The storm weakened rapidly inland and made its second landfall over Buzen, Fukuoka Prefecture, at around 17:30 JST (08:30 UTC), with ten-minute sustained winds of 75 km/h (47 mph) and a central pressure of 992 hPa (29.3 inHg). At around 10:30 CST (02:30 UTC) on August 3, Tropical Storm Jongdari made landfall over Jinshan District, Shanghai. Jongdari rapidly weakened after landfall, dissipating on the next day.

== Impact ==
=== Japan ===
24 people were injured when the typhoon hit Japan. JR-West train services were delayed or cancelled due to the storm. Although Jongdari didn't directly hit Hokuriku region, it did bring föhn wind to the area because it is located at the leeward slope of the Japanese Alps. Niigata prefecture recorded temperatures close to 40 °C (104 °F). Agricultural damage in Chiba and Aichi Prefecture were about JP¥1.59 billion (US$14.3 million). Preliminary industry loss were estimated between US$1.4 and 2 billion.

=== China ===
Total damages from Jongdari were about CN¥420 million (US$61.5 million).

== See also ==
- Weather of 2018
- Tropical cyclones in 2018
- Typhoon Damrey (2012)
- Hurricane Sandy (2012) – Atlantic hurricane which executed a similar turn into the Northeastern U.S.
- Typhoon Noru (2017)
- Tropical Storm Chan-hom (2026) – weaker system that took a similar unusual path into Japan
- 2018 Japan heat wave
