= List of storms named Kujira =

The name Kujira (Japanese: クジラ, [kɯ̟ʑiɾa̠]) has been used for five tropical cyclones in the western North Pacific Ocean. The name was contributed by Japan and refers to the constellation Cetus, the whale, in Japanese.

- Typhoon Kujira (2003) (T0302, 02W, Amang) – a long-lived typhoon that threatened the Philippines and Taiwan before approaching Japan.
- Typhoon Kujira (2009) (T0901, 01W, Dante) – affected the Philippines before turning out to sea.
- Tropical Storm Kujira (2015) (T1508, 08W) – affected Hainan and Northern Vietnam.
- Severe Tropical Storm Kujira (2020) (T2013, 15W) – category 1 typhoon which stayed out to sea.
- Tropical Storm Kujira (2026) (T2614, 13W, Luis–Maymay) — had an erratic track causing minor impacts in Northern Luzon, the first storm to have 2 PAGASA names since Maysak in 2008.

Preceded by Dolphin	Pacific typhoon season names Kujira	Succeeded by Chan-hom
