= Typhoon Wayne (1986) =

Pacific typhoon in 1986

Typhoon Wayne (Miding)
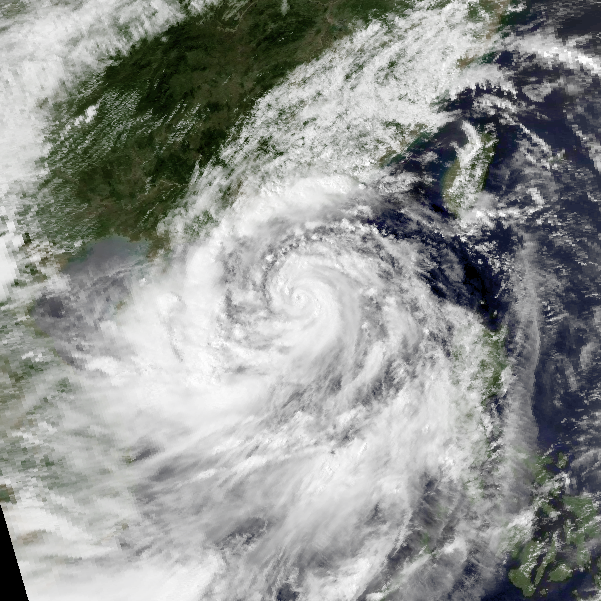
- Typhoon Wayne (Miding) on September 4

Meteorological history
- Formed: August 16, 1986
- Dissipated: September 6, 1986
- Duration: 3 weeks

Typhoon
- 10-minute sustained (JMA)
- Highest winds: 140 km/h (85 mph)
- Lowest pressure: 955 hPa (mbar); 28.20 inHg

Category 2-equivalent typhoon
- 1-minute sustained (SSHWS/JTWC)
- Highest winds: 165 km/h (105 mph)
- Lowest pressure: 950 hPa (mbar); 28.05 inHg

Overall effects
- Fatalities: 490
- Damage: $399 million (1986 USD)
- Areas affected: China, Macau, Hong Kong, Taiwan, Vietnam, Philippines and Japan
- IBTrACS
- Part of the 1986 Pacific typhoon season

Typhoon Wayne, known in the Philippines as Typhoon Miding, is one of the longest-lived tropical cyclones on record in the north-western Pacific Ocean. The system meandered for 21 days in August–September 1986 between the South China Sea and far western tropical North Pacific Ocean, staying within the monsoon trough and causing heavy rains across the Philippines, Taiwan, southeast China, Hainan Island, and Vietnam. Its maximum sustained winds peaked at category two strength on the Saffir–Simpson scale. Various signals were raised for Hong Kong three times due to Wayne's unusual track. A total of 490 perished, and the storm caused US$399 million (1986 US dollars) in damage.

== Meteorological history ==
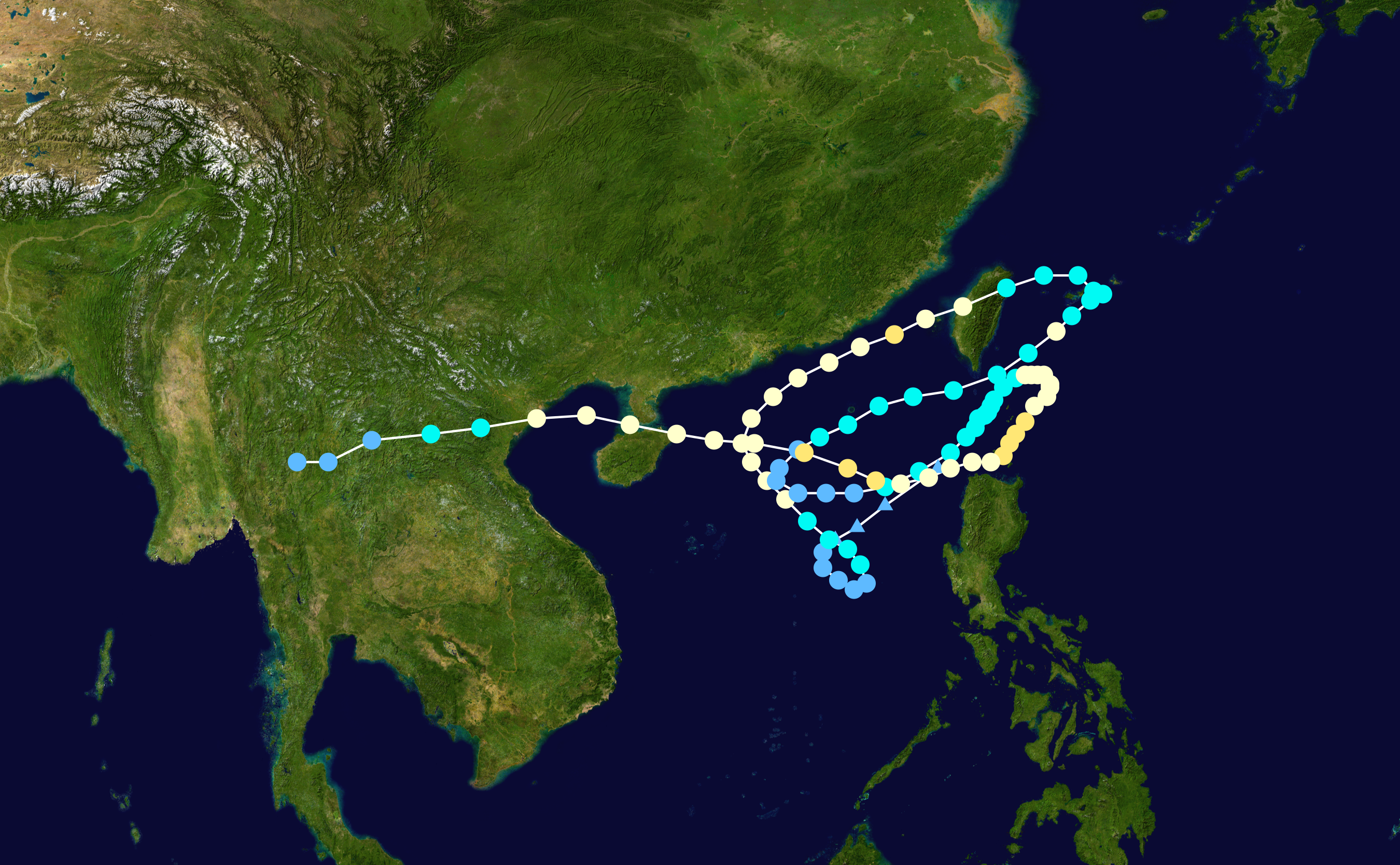
Map plotting the storm's track and intensity, according to the Saffir–Simpson scale Map key Saffir–Simpson scale Tropical depression (≤38 mph, ≤62 km/h) Tropical storm (39–73 mph, 63–118 km/h) Category 1 (74–95 mph, 119–153 km/h) Category 2 (96–110 mph, 154–177 km/h) Category 3 (111–129 mph, 178–208 km/h) Category 4 (130–156 mph, 209–251 km/h) Category 5 (≥157 mph, ≥252 km/h) Unknown Storm type Tropical cyclone Subtropical cyclone Extratropical cyclone, remnant low, tropical disturbance, or monsoon depression

This system began its long life on August 16 in the South China Sea, having formed within the monsoon trough. It drifted to the southwest, then looped back to the northwest, becoming a tropical storm on August 18. Wayne, which remained embedded in the monsoon trough throughout its lifetime, turned to the northeast in response to a relocation of the trough, and became a typhoon according to the Joint Typhoon Warning Center (JTWC) on August 19, and on August 20 according to the Japan Meteorological Agency (JMA). At 2 p.m. that day, the ship M. V. Fossarus recorded 78 knots (144 km/h) winds just west of its center. The typhoon came close but remained offshore of southeastern China, and after reaching maximum sustained winds of 75 knots (139 km/h) it hit western Taiwan on August 22. The building subtropical ridge forced Wayne west and southwestward through the Luzon Strait, where after weakening to a tropical storm it restrengthened briefly to a typhoon on August 24, according to the Joint Typhoon Warning Center. The JMA did not upgrade Wayne back to a typhoon during this segment of Wayne's existence.

Vertical shear caused Wayne to weaken to a depression on August 25 according to the Joint Typhoon Warning Center, and August 26 according to the JMA, as the cyclone began to rotate around the circulation of Vera to its north. Tropical Depression Wayne sped up to the northeast, but when Vera moved far enough away, Wayne drifted northeastward through the South China Sea, becoming a tropical storm again on August 27. Ridging to its north forced Wayne southward, where it again became a typhoon on August 30 according to the Joint Typhoon Warning Center, and August 31 according to the JMA. Wayne passed close to northern Luzon on September 2 as a 75 knots (139 km/h) typhoon, but turned back to the west. The JMA lowered Wayne back to a tropical storm on September 3 before restrengthening the cyclone back into a typhoon by early September 4. On September 4 while moving quickly westward through the South China Sea, Wayne reached a peak of 85 knots (157 km/h) winds according to the Joint Typhoon Warning Center, or 70 knots (130 km/h) winds according to the JMA, before it weakened due to land interaction. It hit northern Hainan on September 5 as an 70 knots (130 km/h) typhoon. Its center passed just north of Haikou, where pressure fell to 970.1 hectopascals (28.65 inHg). Wayne then entered the Gulf of Tonkin, and made its final landfall over Hà Nam Ninh [vi] in northern Vietnam later on that day, as a tropical storm. At a weather station in Nam Định City (Hà Nam Ninh), the sea-level atmospheric pressure was recorded at 967.4 hPa. On September 6, Wayne dissipated over Vietnam/Laos border, after 85 JTWC advisories. The storm was one of the longest lasting Western Pacific tropical cyclones in recorded history.

== Preparations ==
In Hong Kong, the Stand By Signal 1 was hoisted at 11:30 a.m. on August 19. As Wayne approached, the Strong Wind Signal 3 was raised at 11:00 a.m. on August 20. During its first approach, the Northeast Gale/Storm Signal 8 was issued at 10 p.m. on August 20. As winds relaxed, the Strong Wind Signal 3 replaced the Storm Signal 8 at 2 a.m. on August 21, with all signals lowered by 5 a.m. on August 21. During Wayne's second approach, the Stand By Signal 1 was raised at 11:45 a.m. on August 25. Signals were again lowered once Wayne moved farther away at 2:35 p.m. on August 26. During Wayne's third approach, the Stand By Signal 1 was hoisted at 1:30 a.m. on September 4. As Wayne continued its approach, the Strong Wind Signal 3 was raised at 3 p.m. the same day. Once Wayne moved away to the west of the area, signals were lowered for their final time at 2:10 p.m. on September 5.

At the same time, President Corazon Aquino declared a state of calamity over Northern Luzon.

== Impact ==
During its passage of Taiwan, 63 died, 12,000 houses collapsed, and a thousand fishing vessels were wrecked. Total damage to the island reached US$360 million (1986 dollars). As a result of its consistent variance in track and drifting track, Wayne brought torrential rains through its path to the Philippines, Taiwan, southeastern China, Hainan Island, and Vietnam. In Hong Kong, winds gusted to 78 knots (144 km/h) at Tate's Cairn. During its various passages of Hong Kong, a total of 295 millimetres (11.6 in) of rainfall accumulated at Sai Kung. A total of 523.5 millimetres (20.61 in) of rainfall was recorded at Clark Air Force Base in the Philippines. Thirty-six perished in the Philippines. While the storm itself did not bring significant rainfall to Vietnam, the damage inflicted was mainly a result of the powerful winds. The typhoon caused considerable loss of life in Vietnam, with reported fatalities ranging from 408 to nearly 450 people, varying between sources. In total, Typhoon Wayne caused 490 fatalities, left tens of thousands homeless, and caused US$399 million (1986 dollars) in damage. Despite its severe impact, the name Wayne was not retired from the western Pacific naming list and was used again in 1989.

== See also ==
- Typhoons in the Philippines
- Tropical cyclones in Vietnam
- Typhoon Rita (1972) – the second longest-lasting tropical cyclone in the Northwest Pacific
- Hurricane John (1994) — second longest-lived tropical cyclone globally and the farthest travelling tropical cyclone in history
- Typhoon Nari (2001) – a long-lived and erratic storm that affected Taiwan
- Typhoon Tembin (2012) – a long-lived typhoon that affected the Philippines and then hit Taiwan twice in its lifetime
- Hurricane Nadine (2012) – similarly long-lived and erratic tropical cyclone in the Atlantic basin
- Typhoon Noru (2017) — tied for second longest-lasting Northwest Pacific tropical cyclone
- Cyclone Freddy (2023) — longest-lived tropical cyclone globally
- Typhoon Yagi (2024) – took a similar track (with Wayne after 2 September 1986) and caused major damage in Northern Vietnam in the same time in 2024
- Typhoon Danas (2025) — another strong typhoon that made a rare landfall on the western side of Taiwan.
