= Typhoon Lionrock =

Pacific typhoon in 2016

Typhoon Lionrock (Dindo)
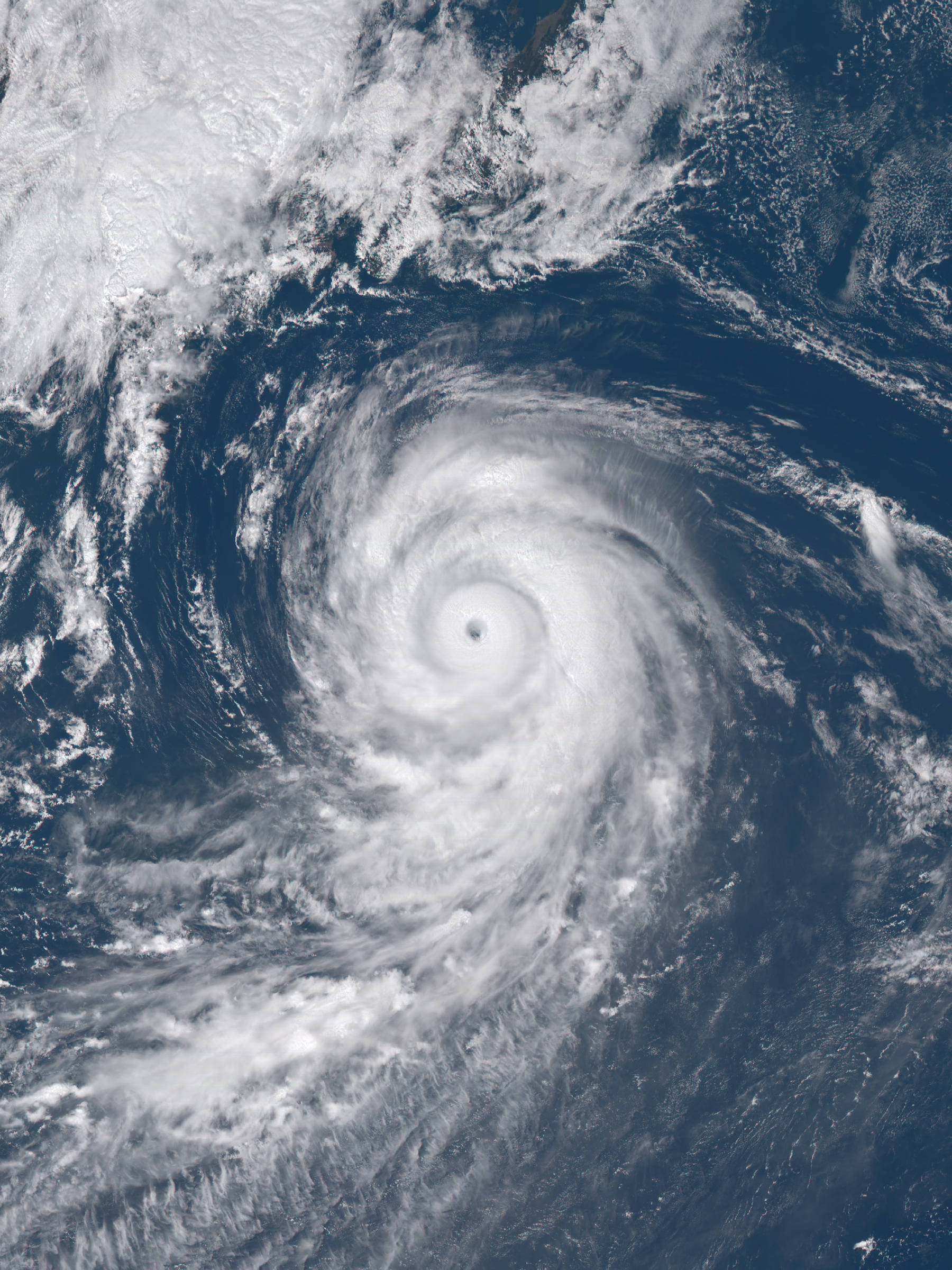
- Lionrock near peak intensity on August 28

Meteorological history
- Formed: August 17, 2016
- Dissipated: August 30, 2016

Very strong typhoon
- 10-minute sustained (JMA)
- Highest winds: 165 km/h (105 mph)
- Lowest pressure: 940 hPa (mbar); 27.76 inHg

Category 4-equivalent typhoon
- 1-minute sustained (SSHWS/JTWC)
- Highest winds: 220 km/h (140 mph)
- Lowest pressure: 933 hPa (mbar); 27.55 inHg

Overall effects
- Fatalities: 550 total
- Damage: $3.93 billion (2016 USD)
- Areas affected: Japan, Russian Far East, North Korea
- IBTrACS
- Part of the 2016 Pacific typhoon season

Typhoon Lionrock, known in the Philippines as Typhoon Dindo, was a large, powerful, long-lived and erratic tropical cyclone which caused significant flooding and casualties in North Korea and Japan in late August 2016. It was the tenth named storm and was the third typhoon of the 2016 Pacific typhoon season. Damages recorded after the season were recorded about US$3.93 billion.

== Meteorological history ==
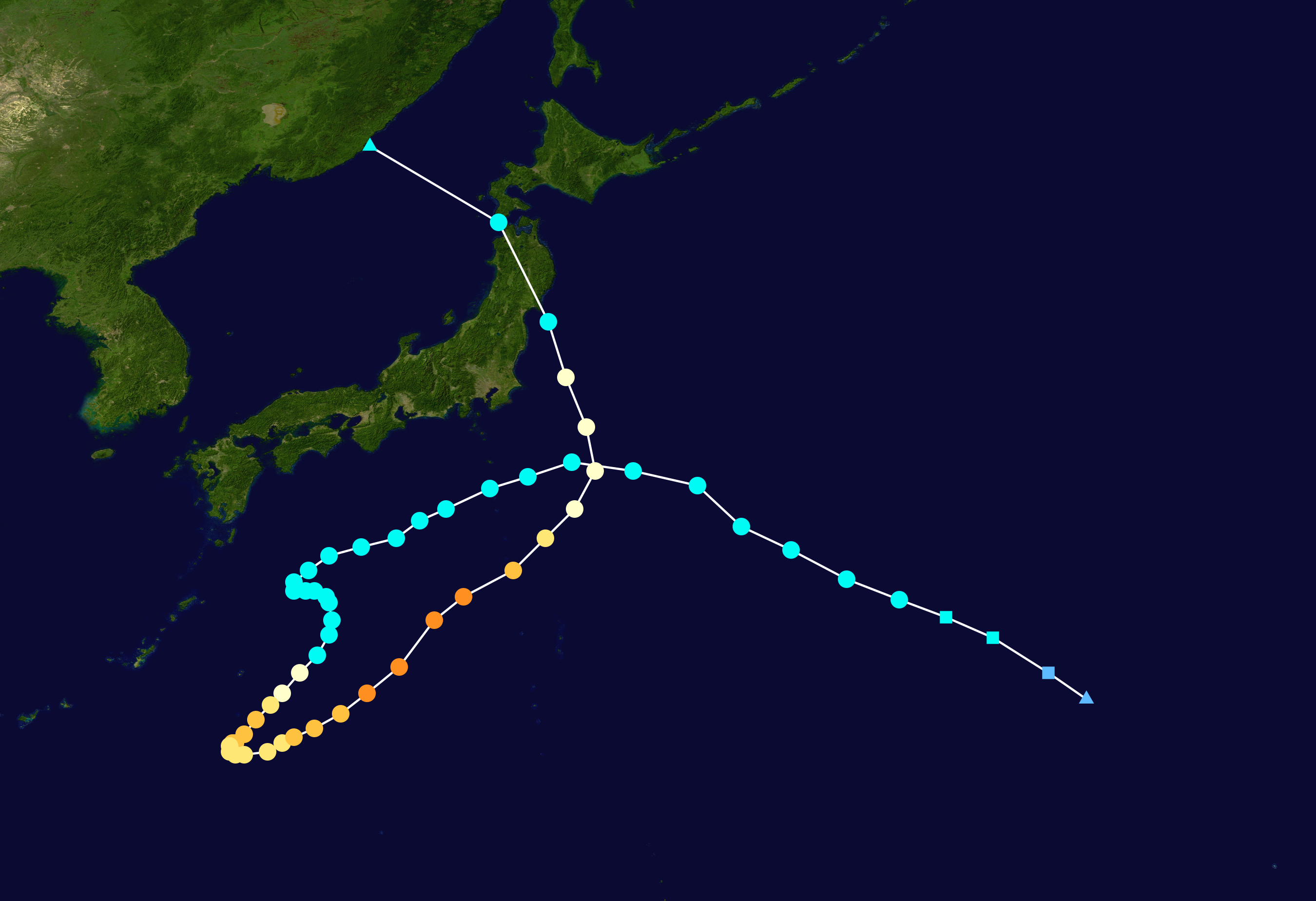
Map plotting the storm's track and intensity, according to the Saffir–Simpson scale Map key Saffir–Simpson scale Tropical depression (≤38 mph, ≤62 km/h) Tropical storm (39–73 mph, 63–118 km/h) Category 1 (74–95 mph, 119–153 km/h) Category 2 (96–110 mph, 154–177 km/h) Category 3 (111–129 mph, 178–208 km/h) Category 4 (130–156 mph, 209–251 km/h) Category 5 (≥157 mph, ≥252 km/h) Unknown Storm type Tropical cyclone Subtropical cyclone Extratropical cyclone, remnant low, tropical disturbance, or monsoon depression

The system that was to become Typhoon Lionrock was first noted as a subtropical disturbance on August 15, while it was located about 585 km (365 mi) to the west of Wake Island. At this time the disturbance had a broad and poorly organized low level circulation centre, which had some shallow bands of atmospheric convection wrapping loosely around it. It was located within a marginal environment for further development and was predicted to develop further, in association with a developing upper-level low. Over the next day the system moved northwards, while a TUTT Cell created subsidence and high vertical windshear over the system, before it was classified as a tropical depression by the Japan Meteorological Agency during August 16. The depression was subsequently classified as subtropical by the United States Joint Typhoon Warning Center during August 17, as its structure was asymmetric, with deep convection displaced to the north and east of the system's low level circulation centre.

Lionrock entered the Philippine Area of Responsibility on August 25, 2016, and PAGASA assigned Dindo as the local name for Lionrock. (Note: The name Lionrock was contributed by Hong Kong and refers to Lion Rock, the name of a peak.) On August 29, Lionrock turned towards the northwest due to a high pressure system located east of Japan, putting it on an unprecedented path towards the northeastern region of the country. Right before weakening into a severe tropical storm at 18:00 JST (09:00 UTC) on August 30, Lionrock made landfall near Ōfunato, a city in Iwate Prefecture, Japan with winds of 75 mph (121 km/h). This makes Lionrock the first tropical cyclone to make landfall over the Pacific coast of the Tōhoku region of Japan since the Japan Meteorological Agency began record-keeping in 1951.

Lionrock's track was unusual due to the fact that the storm approached Japan from the southeast and made landfall along the east coast of the country. Most typhoons that hit Japan approach from the south or the southwest before moving northward across the archipelago. In fact, the only other storm to take a similar track was Typhoon Mac in 1989, which also approached from the southeast and struck Japan's Kantō region along its east coast.

== Preparations ==
Japan's Prime Minister Shinzō Abe left a Japan-African development conference in Nairobi, Kenya early due to the threat of flight cancellations caused by the typhoon. Prior to Lionrock making landfall, a total of 100 flights were cancelled at airports in Tohoku and Hokkaido. Efforts were made to protect the Fukushima Daiichi Nuclear Power Plant from further damage, as it had been severely incapacitated following the 2011 Tōhoku earthquake and tsunami. The amount of water being pumped at the facility was increased in order to minimize the risk of floods, and crane operations were suspended due to the threat of strong winds.

In eastern Russia, a storm warning was announced on 28 August by EMERCOM. All emergency services and troops were on high alert. Local authorities were informed on emergency procedures.

North Korea's Early Warning and Evacuation system was activated ahead of the storm, causing 44,000 people in flood-prone areas to be evacuated in North Hamgyong Province.

== Impact ==
=== Japan ===
Infrares satellite loop of Lionrock making landfall in Tōhoku region on August 30

Upon making landfall on August 30, Lionrock brought very heavy rainfall, including 13.46 inches (342 mm) at Mount Nukabira, in Hokkaidō Prefecture, and 8.78 inches (223 mm) in Orito in Iwate Prefecture. In addition, a maximum wind gust of 69 mph (111 km/h) was recorded in Ishinomaki, and a 66 mph (106 km/h) wind gust was measured in Onagawa. Lionrock killed a total of 22 people across Japan, including 19 people in the town of Iwaizumi in Iwate Prefecture. Nine people drowned in a nursing home in Iwaizumi after a river burst its banks. In addition, there were at least three fatalities on the northern Japanese island Hokkaidō. Damage due to flooding were standing at JP¥282 billion (US$2.74 billion).

=== Russia ===
On 31 August, the storm hit Primorsky Krai. Heavy rainfall caused floods in several areas with 300 houses flooded in rural areas. Local rivers overflowed, several bridges were destroyed or damaged and several highways were affected by floods. A dam failure along the Pavlovka river caused floods in the Shumny and Antonovka villages. More than 1,000 inhabitants were evacuated and several evacuation camps were established in all affected areas, mostly in schools. The storm also caused power disruptions. 12,000 rescue workers were also deployed in the area.

The southern part of the Sakhalin was also affected. Several cars were struck by fallen trees and electricity was shut down in some houses. Heavy rain flooded Makarovsky and caused a landslide which blocked a highway and a railway. Two trains on the Yuzhno-Sakhalinsk-Nogliki line were cancelled and one of them, No. 604, was stopped in Poronaysk. In Vakhrushev, one of the cargo trains derailed. Hours later, the incident was fixed and its operations returned to normal. However, one fatality was reported during the incident. In addition, two EMERCOM officers (the chief of the Primorsky Krai department and his driver) died when their KAMAZ truck fell into the Pavlovka River. Lionrock was the worst typhoon to hit the Primorsky Krai region in 40 years, with total damage exceeds ₽7 billion (US$107 million).

=== China ===
A total of 464,900 ha (1,149,000 acres) of agricultural land were impacted in China, including 53,500 hectares (132,000 acres) of crops which were destroyed due to floods. Damages in China are estimated to be CN¥7.21 billion (US$1.08 billion); most of which was inflicted on the agricultural sector.

=== North Korea ===
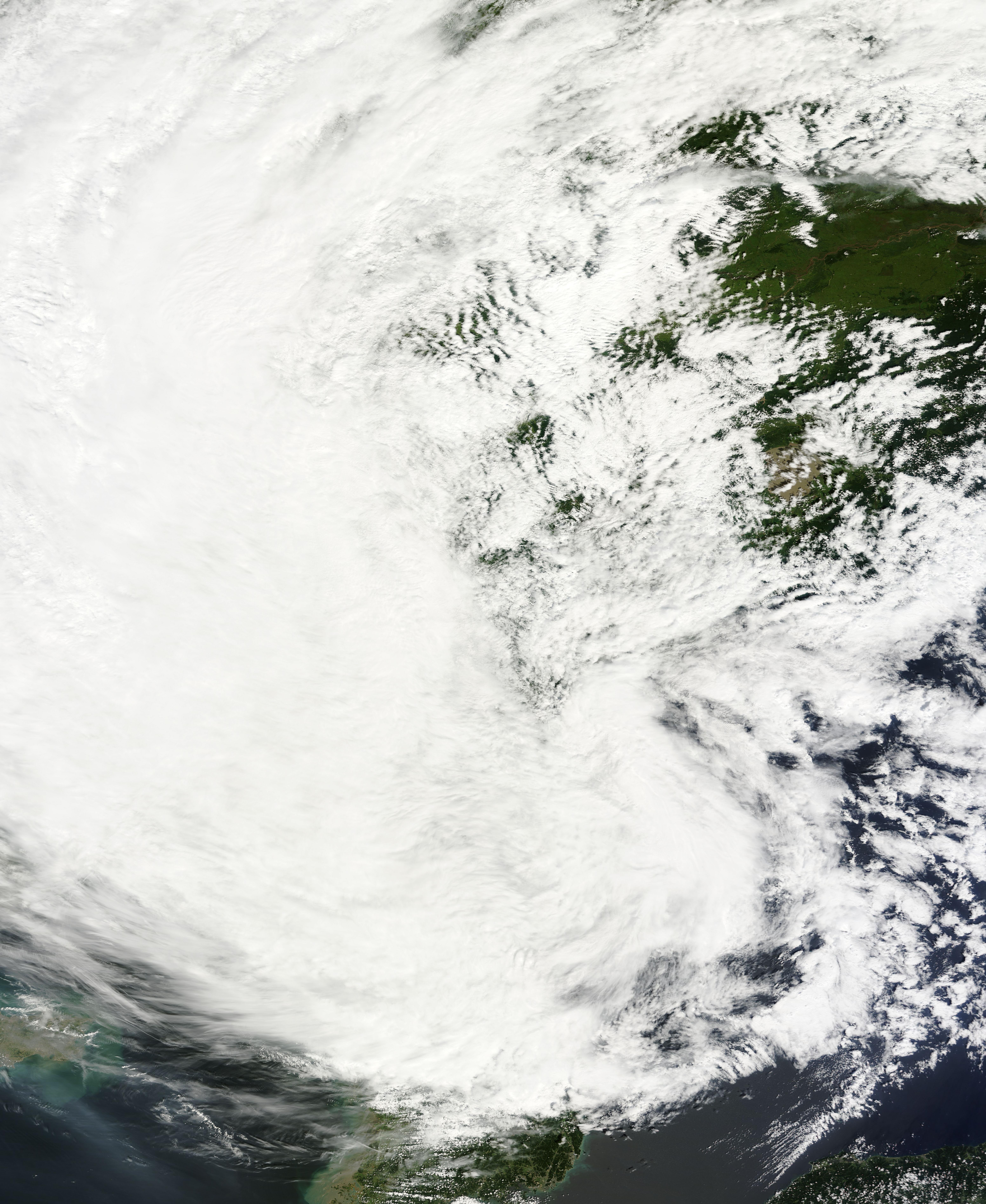
The extratropical remnants of Lionrock over Northeast China and Russia on August 31

Lionrock interacted with a low pressure area over China to drop heavy rainfall in North Korea, mostly in North Hamgyong Province, considered by the state media Korean Central News Agency to be the "heaviest downpour since 1945". Over a two-day period, Kyonghung County recorded 320 mm (13 in) of rainfall. This caused flooding along the Tumen River and its tributaries, inundating about 16,000 ha (40,000 acres) of farmlands just weeks ahead of the harvest, of which 10,145 ha (25,070 acres) were wrecked.

The floods from Lionrock caused "a disaster beyond anything experienced by local officials", according to a local UNICEF representative, and were described as "a very major and complex disaster" by Chris Staines, head of the Red Cross Society of the Democratic People's Republic of Korea. The affected area had poor infrastructure and deforestation on hills, exacerbating the floods' impacts. Entire villages were washed away, carrying away families' entire possessions. Three people trapped in floodwaters were rescued by two Chinese rescue boats. Over 35,500 houses were damaged, of which around 25,000 were destroyed, forcing 107,000 people from their homes; many of these people sheltered on higher grounds or in public buildings. Floods from Lionrock damaged another 8,700 non-residential buildings, including schools and public buildings. In Ryanggang Province, the heavy rains caused a five-story building to collapse, killing 34 people. In Hoeryong city, over 104,000 people lost access to clean water during the floods, and nationwide about 600,000 people were affected by water cuts. Musan and Yonsa counties were unreachable and had little communications, resulting in the slow spread of information on the disaster. The floods also washed away six bridges and 31 km (19 mi) of roads, with 43 km (27 mi) of road bed damaged. The floods related to Lionrock killed at least 525 people in the country.

==== Aftermath ====
After the floods, the North Korean government sent workers to clear roads and restore communications in the hardest hit areas. The government sent a truck from the capital Pyongyang with medical kits and vitamin supplements on September 5, and announced a plan to rebuild 20,000 houses by early October 2016. The Central Committee of the Workers' Party of Korea requested that party members redirected their efforts from a 200-day mass worker program intended to improve the economy, and instead send soldiers to help with flood relief. About 1,000 volunteers from the country's Red Cross chapter helped local workers in search and rescue missions. The agency had relief supplies for about 20,000 people, including tarpaulins, tents, kitchen sets, and water purification tablets. Red Cross workers coordinated with members of the international delegation between September 3–6, resulting in increased resources for health services. The local Red Cross launched an appeal for emergency aid in response to the disaster through the state media Korean Central News Agency. The government, which rarely releases information on disasters in the country, requested for aid from the international community, just days after a nuclear weapons test that led to calls for increased sanctions. The World Food Programme provided emergency food rations for 140,000 people in need of immediate assistance.

== See also ==
- Weather of 2016
- Tropical cyclones in 2016
- Typhoon Roke (2011)
- Typhoon Wipha (2013)
- Typhoon Noru (2017)
- Typhoon Jongdari (2018)
- Cyclone Winston - A cyclone in the same year that executed a similar path.
