= Tri Tôn district =

Coordinates: 10.417°N 105.000°E

Tri Tôn district Huyện Tri Tôn
- District
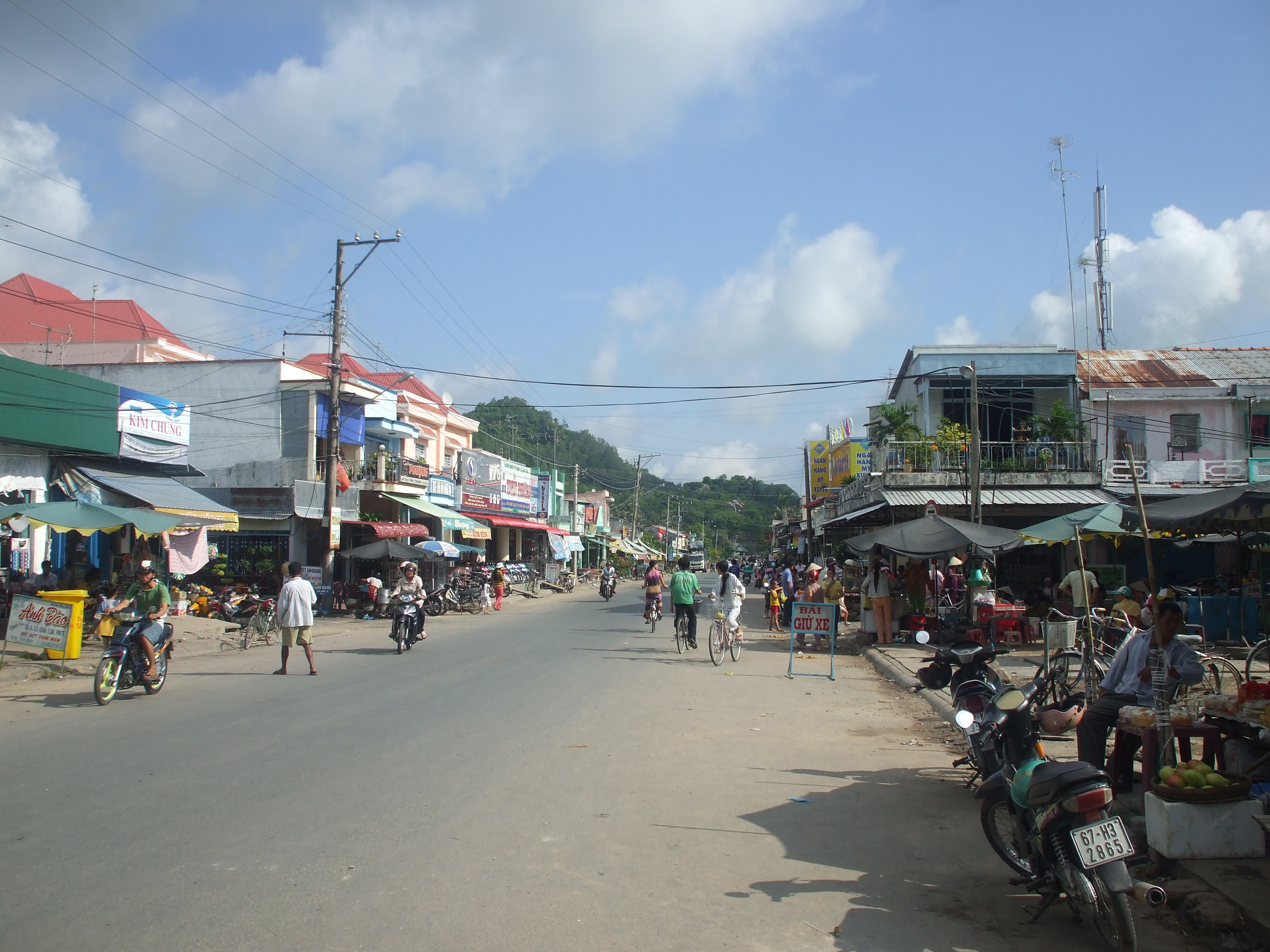

- Seal

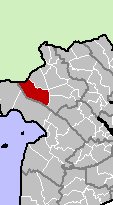
- Location in An Giang province
- Country: Vietnam
- Province: An Giang
- Capital: Tri Tôn

Area
  - District: 231 sq mi (598 km^{2})

Population (2019 census)
  - District: 117,431
  - Density: 509/sq mi (196/km^{2})
  - Urban: 27,485
- Time zone: UTC+07:00 (Indochina Time)

Tri Tôn is a rural district (huyện) of An Giang province in the Mekong Delta region of Vietnam. As of 2019 the district had a population of 117,431. The district covers an area of 598 square kilometres (231 square miles). The district capital lies at Tri Tôn and is 44 kilometres (27 miles) away from Châu Đốc. There is a sacred mountain system named after Seven Mountains here where Bửu Sơn Kỳ Hương tradition monks live.

== History ==
It was the location of the Ba Chúc massacre committed by the Khmer Rouge in 1978, which was part of a series of cross-border incursions skirmishes that prompted a Vietnamese invasion of Cambodia.

On June 16, 2025, the Standing Committee of the National Assembly issued Resolution No. 1685/NQ-UBTVQH15. The district was dissolved and new wards were rearranged from the district.

== Administrative divisions ==
The district is divided into two townships: Tri Tôn (the district capital) and Ba Chúc, and the communes of Châu Lăng, Lương Phi, Vĩnh Phước, Lương An Trà, Lạc Quới, Vĩnh Gia, Núi Tô, An Tức, Ô Lâm, Cô Tô, Tà Đảnh and Tân Tuyến.
