= Cô Tô (disambiguation) =

Cô Tô is a special administrative region of Quảng Ninh province.

Cô Tô may also refer to:

- Cô Tô Island, an island in Cô Tô special administrative region
- Cô Tô, An Giang, a commune of An Giang province
