= Cát Hải =

- Special administrative region
Cát Hải Special Zone of Hải Phòng City
Other official names
- - Vietnamese: Đặc khu Cát Hải trực thuộc thành phố Hải Phòng; Quần đảo Cát Bà và đảo Long Châu
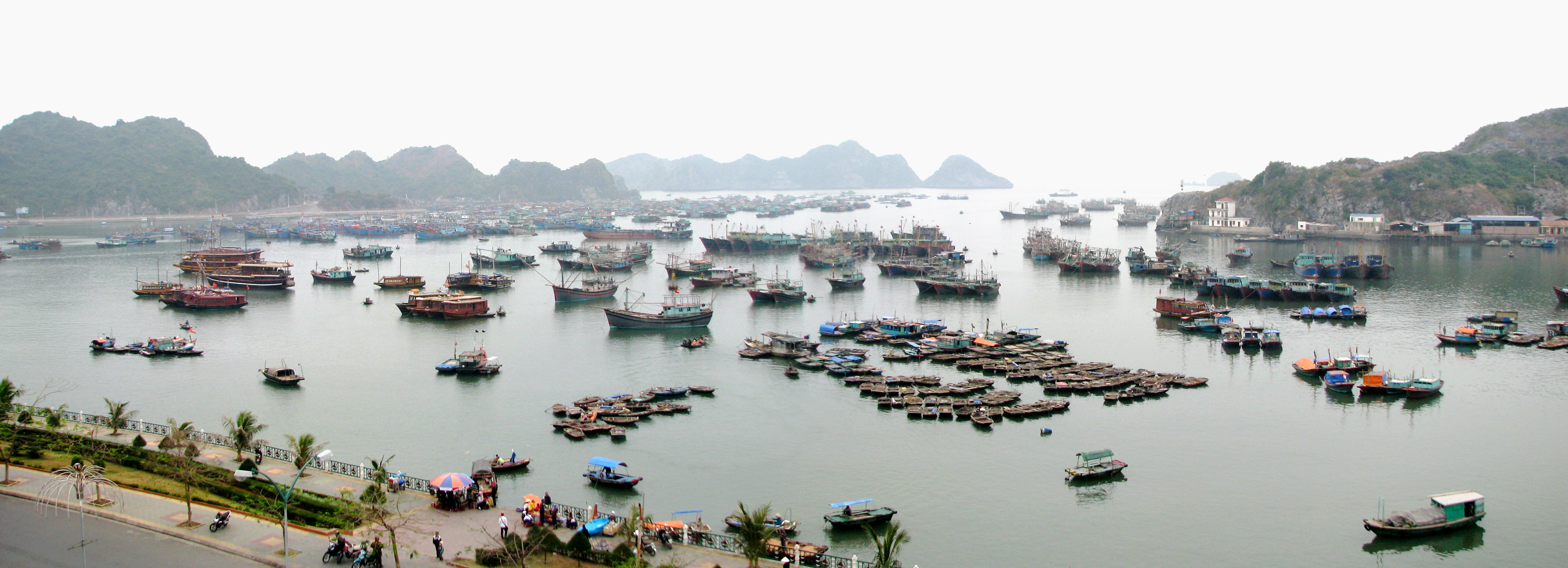
- Panorama of Cát Bà harbour.
- Interactive map of Cát Hải
- Location of Cát Hải in Vietnam.
- Coordinates: 20°49′01″N 107°00′00″E
- Country: Vietnam
- Region: Red River Delta
- Municipality: Hải Phòng
- Establishment: 18th century (sea fort); 19th century (fish port); April 22, 2025 (special zone)
- Central hall: No.1, Hà Liên road, Cát Bà harbour, Cát Bà island, Cát Hải special zone

Government
  - Type: Commune-level authority
  - People Committee's Chairman: Bùi Tuấn Mạnh
  - People Council's Chairman: Hoàng Hồng Luân
  - Front Committee's Chairman: Vũ Thị Mỹ Liên
  - Party Committee's Secretary: Trần Văn Phương

Area
  - Special administrative region: 325.6 km^{2} (125.7 sq mi)

Population (2019)
  - Special administrative region: 32,090
  - Density: 98/km^{2} (250/sq mi)
  - Urban: 18,147
  - Metro: 13,943
  - Ethnicities: Kinh; Tanka
- Time zone: UTC+7 (Indochina Time)
- ZIP code: 187300
- Website: Cathai.Haiphong.gov.vn; Cathai.Haiphong.dcs.vn

Cát Hải [kaːt˧˥:ha̰ːj˧˩˧] is an archipelago in the Gulf of Tonkin. Its full name is Cát Hải Special Zone of Hải Phòng City belonging to Hải Phòng city in the Red River Delta of Vietnam.

== History ==
Its name Cát Hải means "Cát Bà Long Châu Hải Dương Thương Chính Quan Phòng" (Hán Nôm: 葛婆、龍珠，海陽商政關防) in common Middle-age Annamese language.

All Cát Hải area's knowledge before the 18th century was legendary and had very little things recorded by royal historians. However, according to the administrative documents of Hải Phòng city, this territory in the past included two archipelagos as Các Bà (the ladies) and Cửa Đức Ông (the gentlemen). Over time, those names were wrongly called by folk to become Cát Bà and Long Châu.

=== Middle Ages ===
According to Đồng Khánh địa dư chí lược, at the beginning of the 19th century, the territory of Cát Hải rural district was two cantons Đôn Lương and Hà Liên, belonging Hoa Phong rural district (huyện Hoa Phong), Sơn Định prefecture, Quảng Yên province. Nghiêu Phong district has many different names: Động Phục Long, Ân Phong, Chi Phong. (Note: Ban chỉ huy quân sự huyện Cát Hải (2002). Huyện đảo Cát Hải, 55 năm kháng chiến, xây dựng và bảo vệ Tổ Quốc, 1945-2000. Nhà xuất bản Quân Đội Nhân Dân. tr. 9.) Until the first year of Thiệu Trị (1841), it was renamed Nghiêu Phong to avoid the real name of Dowager Queen Hồ Thị Hoa.

Since the years of Đồng Khánh, Nghiêu Phong rural district (huyện Nghiêu Phong) has included three cantons Đôn Lương, Hà Liên and Vân Hải.

=== 20th century ===
On August 19, 1890, Tonkinese viceroy Hoàng Cao Khải issued a decree to change Nghiêu Phong from a rural district into a prefecture. Because of that, Vân Hải canton has been raised to Vân Hải rural district, at the same time, Đôn Lương was merged with Hà Liên to become Cát Hải rural district. Its capital seated in Cát Bà street (phố Cát Bà), where was later expanded to the township (đại lí Cát Bà), then the town (thị xã Cát Bà). (Note: Vũ Văn Tỉnh (1970). Những thay đổi về địa lý hành chính các tỉnh Bắc Kỳ trong thời kỳ Pháp thuộc (PDF). tr. 54.)

The territory of Cát Hải island district (huyện đảo Cát Hải) only consisted of two archipelagos Cát Bà and Long Châu. In particular, the area of Cát Bà island was almost the area of the special zone.

=== 21st century ===
On April 22, 2025, to meet promptly the plan to arrange and merge administrative units by the Government of Vietnam, the People's Committees of Hải Dương province and Hải Phòng City passed a resolution on the dissolution of all rural-district level administrative units in new Hải Phòng City, (Note: It includes the entire area and demography of Hải Dương Province and old-Hải Phòng City.) followed by another Resolution on the merger of communes and the establishment of new communes with their new names.

According to the political document officially published for the press, Cát Hải island-district was also dissolved. The entire area and demography have been transformed to commune-level administrative unit, which is called as Cát Hải Special Zone of Hải Phòng City (海防市葛海特區, Đặc khu Cát Hải trực thuộc thành phố Hải Phòng). Cát Hải special zone is directly under the management of expanded Hải Phòng City.

== Geography ==
As of 2018 the Cát Hải special zone had a population of 43,187. The special zone covers an area of 295 km^{2} (114 sq mi). Its capital lies in Cát Bà Island.

== Economy ==
The islands are subject to major land developments. VinFast has built an automobile factory on the Southern half of the island, and Sun Group is developing a holiday resort on the northern half. A 5.44 km long bridge - the longest sea crossing in Vietnam - connects the island to Hai Phong.

== See also ==
- Bạch Long Vĩ
- Cô Tô
- Hoàng Sa special administrative region
