= Subdivisions of Vietnam =

2025 official map, which also includes all disputed territories and islands that are unilaterally claimed by the Vietnamese state.

Vietnam is divided into 25 provinces and 9 centrally-governed city. It is a unitary state.

== Administrative units (from 1 July 2025) ==
Pursuant to the constitution, there are two levels of administrative divisions in Vietnam: provinces and communes. Depending on the level of urbanisation, each level of administrative division comprises multiple types of administrative units:

- Provincial level: centrally-governed city (Vietnamese: thành phố trực thuộc trung ương, lit. 'city subordinate to central authority' or simply thành phố, 'city') and province (tỉnh)
- Commune level: ward (phường) in major urban areas, commune (xã) for rural areas, and special zone (đặc khu) for considerable island formations.

Administrative hierarchy
Level	Type		
Provincial level	Province (Tỉnh)		Centrally governed cities (Thành phố trực thuộc trung ương)
Communal level	Ward (Phường)	Commune (Xã)	Special zone (Đặc khu)

=== First level ===
As of 20 September 2026, the first level consists of 9 centrally governed cities and 25 provinces.

=== Second level ===
Both municipalities and provinces are subdivided into wards (phường), communes (xã) and special administrative zones (đặc khu). As of July 1, 2025, there are 3,321 second-level units with 687 wards, 2,621 communes and 13 special administrative regions.

=== Unofficial third level ===
Communes and wards are divided into villages (thôn) and neighborhoods (tổ dân phố, khu phố), respectively. They do not have official status, but rather, exist for the purposes of local governance. As such, officials at this level are only entitled to an operating allowance and aren't recognized as actual civil servants.

== Before 1 July 2025 ==
=== Second level ===
Centrally-governed cities are subdivided into district-level cities (municipal cities), urban districts, towns, and rural districts. There is no official capital or seat of the municipality but local authority headquarters are usually located in one or more central urban districts.

Provinces are subdivided into district-level cities (provincial cities), towns, and rural districts. Currently, all provinces have their capitals in a district-level city, although some were previously towns.

As of 1 September 2024, there are 704 second-tier units.

As urbanisation progresses, rural districts may be reclassified as towns, then to provincial cities (or towns and municipal cities in municipalities, and eventually to urban districts if they merge into the central urban area of a municipality). Note that the term

From 1 July 2025, as a result of a constitutional amendment and related legislation, all district-level administrative subdivisions ceased to exist.

=== Third level ===
Urban districts are subdivided into wards, while cities and towns are subdivided into (urban) wards and (rural) communes. Rural districts are subdivided into (urban) townships (or townlets) and (rural) communes. Only rural districts have designated capitals, usually in a township.

As of 1 September 2024, there are 10,542 third-level units with 1,775 wards, 618 townships and 8,149 communes.

Townships are known as thị trấn in Vietnamese, but less common type of townships are farm townships (thị trấn nông trường). These were formerly more common during the planned economy era.

Administrative subdivisions of Vietnam from 2016 to 30 June 2025

A fourth, unofficial tier also exists, with categories translated as hamlets (xóm, ấp), villages (làng, thôn, bản) and neighbourhoods (tổ dân phố, khu phố).

== Geographic regions ==
Regions of Vietnam

For various administrative, planning, and statistical purposes, the Vietnamese government groups its provinces and municipalities into 3 geographic regions and 6 subregions (known officially as "socio-economic" regions), two of which may be divided into two additional subregions of their own.

Regions of Vietnam
Geographic region	"Socio-economic (sub)regions"	Equivalent geographic subregions
Northern Vietnam (Bắc Bộ, Miền Bắc)	Northern Midland and Mountainous Regions (Trung du và miền núi phía Bắc)	Northwest (Tây Bắc Bộ)
Northern Vietnam (Bắc Bộ, Miền Bắc)	Northern Midland and Mountainous Regions (Trung du và miền núi phía Bắc)	Northeast (Đông Bắc Bộ)
Northern Vietnam (Bắc Bộ, Miền Bắc)	Red River Delta (Đồng bằng sông Hồng)	
Central Vietnam (Trung Bộ, Miền Trung)	North Central Coast (Note: or the "North Central Region".) (Bắc Trung Bộ)	
Central Vietnam (Trung Bộ, Miền Trung)	South Central Coast and Central Highlands (Note: or the "South Central Region".) (Duyên hải Nam Trung Bộ và Tây Nguyên)	South Central Coast (Duyên hải Nam Trung Bộ)
Central Vietnam (Trung Bộ, Miền Trung)	South Central Coast and Central Highlands (Duyên hải Nam Trung Bộ và Tây Nguyên)	Central Highlands (Tây Nguyên)
Southern Vietnam (Nam Bộ, Miền Nam)	Southeast (Đông Nam Bộ)	
Southern Vietnam (Nam Bộ, Miền Nam)	Mekong River Delta (Note: or the "Southwest".) (Đồng bằng sông Cửu Long)	

== Other subdivisions ==
Vietnam is also divided into electoral divisions and military regions.

=== Electoral divisions ===
For electoral purposes, each province or municipality is divided into electoral units (đơn vị bầu cử) which are further divided into voting zones (khu vực bỏ phiếu). The number of electoral divisions varies from election to election and depends on the population of that province or municipality.

Since the 2011 National Assembly election, there have been 183 electoral units and 89,960 voting zones.

=== Military regions ===
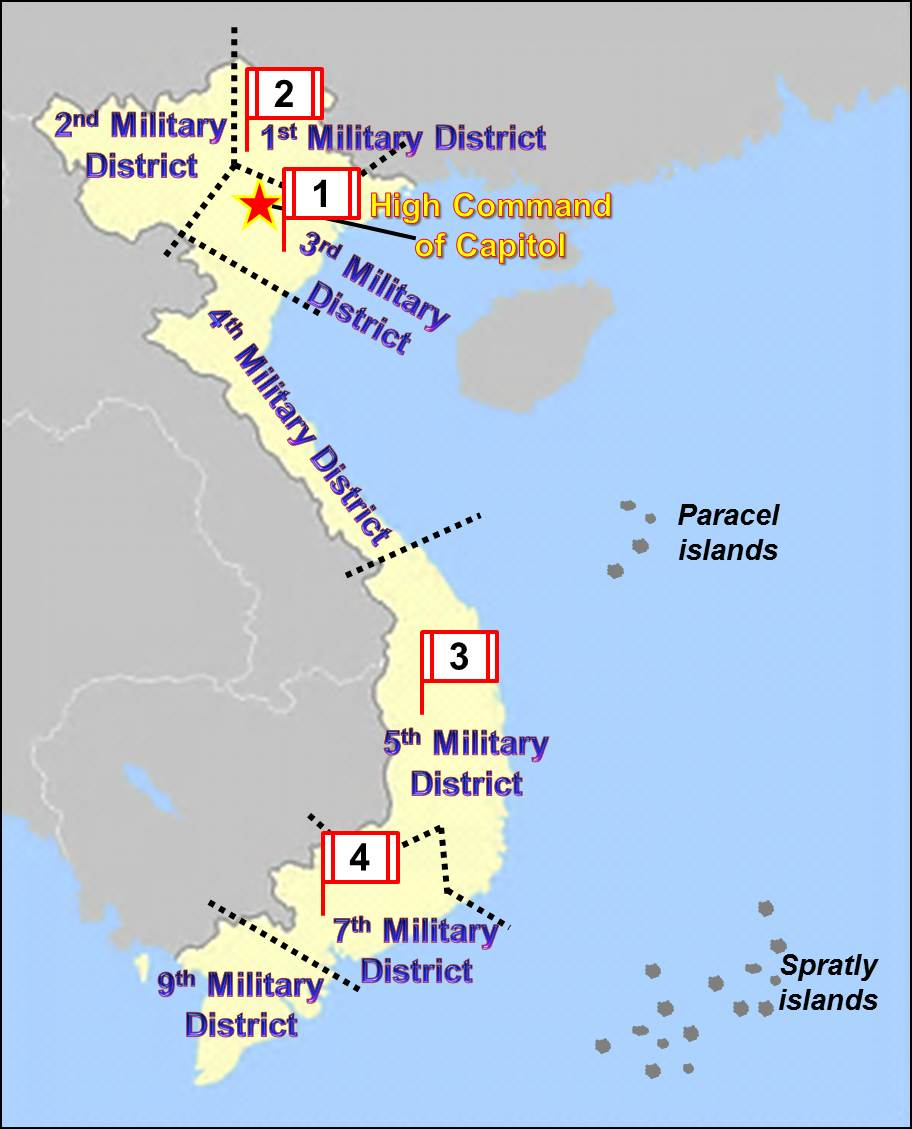
Military regions of Vietnam

Vietnam People's Army is organised into 8 military regions:

- High Command of Capital Hanoi (Bộ Tư lệnh Thủ đô Hà Nội) in Ha Noi
- 1st Military Region (Vietnam People's Army) (Quân khu 1) in Northeast
- 2nd Military Region (Vietnam People's Army) (Quân khu 2) in Northwest
- 3rd Military Region (Vietnam People's Army) (Quân khu 3) in Red River Delta
- 4th Military Region (Vietnam People's Army) (Quân khu 4) in North Central Coast
- 5th Military Region (Vietnam People's Army) (Quân khu 5) in South Central Coast and Central Highland
- 7th Military Region (Vietnam People's Army) (Quân khu 7) in Southeast
- 9th Military Region (Vietnam People's Army) (Quân khu 9) in Mekong Delta

== See also ==
- List of cities in Vietnam
- Plan to arrange and merge administrative units in Vietnam 2024–2025
