= 3rd Military Region (People's Army of Vietnam) =

Military region of the People's Army of Vietnam

Coordinates: 20°30′N 106°00′E

Quân khu 3 (3rd Military Region)
- Active: 31 October 1945 (as 3rd War Zone); 1 November 1963 - present (as 3rd Military Region)
- Country: Vietnam
- Allegiance: People's Army of Vietnam
- Branch: Active duty
- Role: Regular force
- Size: Equivalent to Corps
- Part of: People's Army of Vietnam
- Garrison/HQ: Hải Phòng
- Engagements: First Indochina War; Vietnam War; Sino-Vietnamese War
- Decorations: Gold Star Order

Commanders
- Current commander: Lieutenant General Lương Văn Kiểm
- Political commissar: Lieutenant General Nguyễn Đức Hưng

The 3rd Military Region of Vietnam People's Army is directly under the Ministry of Defence of Vietnam, tasked with the organization, creation and management of armed forces specializing in the Red River Delta. The north-West region of Vietnam borders with the Guangxi, China. In 1979, Chinese army with one infantry division, launched an invasion in this military zone.

== Agencies ==
- Department of Staff
  - 30th Guard Battalion
  - 31st Reconnaissance Battalion
  - 41st Commando Battalion
  - Unmanned Vehicle Battalion
  - 33rd Artillery Command Battalion
  - 97th Electronic Warfare Battalion
  - 38th Chemical Defense Battalion
    - 1st Chemical Reconnaissance Company
    - 2nd Decontamination - Smoke Company
    - Mixed Chemical Company (ARS-14)
  - 10th Engineer Workshop Battalion
- Department of Politics
- Department of Logistics - Technical
  - 653rd Transportation Brigade
    - 1st Transportation Battalion (KAMAZ truck)
    - 2nd Transportation Battalion (KAMAZ truck)
    - 3rd Marine Transportation Battalion
    - 4th Marine Transportation Battalion
  - 7th Military Hospital
  - K22 Warehouse
  - K23 Warehouse
  - K76 Warehouse
  - K84 Warehouse
  - X56 Workshop
  - X81 Workshop
  - Fuel Depot
- 3rd Military Region Military School
  - 3rd Training Battalion
  - 4th Training Battalion

== Subordinate units ==
- Military Command of Hải Phòng
  - Border Guard Command of Hải Phòng
  - 50th Infantry Regiment
  - 125th Infantry Regiment
  - 836th Infantry Regiment
  - Bạch Long Vĩ Island Defense Battalion
  - 34th Tank Battalion (PT-76, BTR-60PB, BTR-152)
  - 20th Reconnaissance Company
  - Guard - Military Police Platoon
  - Signal Company
  - Engineer Company
  - Warehouse Company
  - Military Command Clinic
- Military Command of Quảng Ninh Province
  - Border Guard Command of Quảng Ninh
  - 17th Infantry Regiment
    - Vĩnh Thực Island Company
  - 18th Infantry Regiment
  - 244th Infantry Regiment
  - Mechanized Reconnaissance Company (BTR-152)
  - Guard - Military Police Platoon
  - Signal Company
  - Engineer Company
  - 29th Warehouse
  - Repair Station
- Military Command of Hưng Yên Province
  - Border Guard Command of Hưng Yên
  - 19th Infantry Regiment
  - 126th Infantry Regiment
  - 568th Infantry Regiment
  - 2 Mechanized Reconnaissance Companies (BTR-152)
  - Guard - Military Police Platoon
  - Signal Company
  - Engineer Company
  - Provincial Military Command Clinic
  - K41 Warehouse
- Military Command of Ninh Bình Province
  - Border Guard Command of Ninh Bình
  - 151st Infantry Regiment
  - 180th Infantry Regiment
  - 855th Infantry Regiment
  - 3 Mechanized Reconnaissance Companies (BTR-152)
  - Signal Company
  - Engineer Company
- 350th Division
  - 582nd Infantry Regiment
  - 583rd Infantry Regiment
  - 584th Infantry Regiment
  - 17th Engineer Battalion
  - 18th Signal Battalion
  - 24th Medical Battalion
  - 25th Transportation Battalion (KAMAZ, FAW truck)
- 395th Division
  - 2nd Infantry Regiment
  - 8th Infantry Regiment
  - 43rd Infantry Regiment
  - 16th Air Defense Battalion
  - 17th Engineer Battalion
  - 25th Transportation Battalion (KAMAZ truck)
- 242nd Island Defense Brigade
  - 162nd Infantry Battalion
  - Cô Tô Island Battalion
  - Ngọc Vừng Island Battalion
  - Trần Island Battalion
    - 8th Company
    - Artillery Company (ZiS-3 field gun)
  - 16th Air Defense Company (Type 65 anti-aircraft gun)
- 405th Tank Brigade
  - 1st Tank Battalion (PT-76, T-54/T-55)
  - 2nd Tank Battalion (T-54M/T-55M)
  - 3rd Armored Battalion (Type 63 APC)
  - Reconnaissance Company
  - Signals Company
  - Engineer Company
  - Repair Company
  - Transportation Company
  - 493rd Shooting Range
- 603rd Signals Brigade
  - 1st Signals Battalion (radio communication)
  - 2nd Signals Battalion (wired communication)
  - 3nd Signals Battalion (specialized signal vehicle & SATCOM)
- 513th Engineer Brigade
  - 1st Engineer Battalion (Structural)
  - 2nd Engineer Battalion (Road and Bridge)
  - 3rd Engineer Battalion (Headquarters, emplacement)
  - 4th River Crossing Battalion (PTS amphibious vehicle, GSP-55, PMP floating bridge)
  - Repair Company
- 214th Air Defense Brigade
  - 1st Air Defense Battalion (AZP S-60)
  - 3rd Air Defense Battalion (Type 65 anti-aircraft gun)
  - 4th Air Defense Battalion (Strela-2)
  - Signals Company
- 454th Artillery Brigade
  - 1st Artillery Battalion (M-46 field gun)
  - 2nd Artillery Battalion (M101 howitzer)
  - 3rd Artillery Battalion (BM-21 MLRS)
- 327th Economic - Defense Group
  - 155th Forest Farm

=== Independent units ===
- 202nd Tank Brigade of Tank - Armored Arms (Ninh Bình Province)
  - 2nd Armored Battalion (Type 63 APC)
  - 66th Tank Battalion (T-54/T-55, T-54M)
  - 198th Tank Battalion (T-54/T-55)
  - 10th Reconnaissance Company (BRDM-2)
  - 13th Signals Company (BRDM-2 signal vehicle)
  - 14th Engineer Company
  - 15th Transportation Company (ZIL-130, KAMAZ truck)
  - 11th Repair Company
- 490th Missile Brigade of Artillery - Missile Command (Hải Phòng)
  - 1st Missile Battalion (SS-1C Scud-B)
  - 2nd Missile Battalion (SS-1C Scud-B)
  - 3rd Missile Battalion (SS-1C Scud-B)
