= Special zones of Vietnam =

Type of second-level administrative unit in Vietnam

A special zone (Vietnamese: đặc khu), sometimes also translated as special administrative zone or special administrative region, is a newly-defined type of second-tier subdivision in Vietnam. Theoretically equivalent to the common second-tier subdivisions like communes and wards, special zone is largely a designation for island units under a province or a centrally-controlled city.

As of July 1, 2025, Vietnam has 13 special administrative zones.

== Regulations in law ==
In the 2013 Constitution, Chapter IX: Local Government, Clause 1, Article 110 states:

The administrative units of the Socialist Republic of Vietnam are defined as follows:

1. The country is divided into provinces and centrally-controlled cities;
2. Provinces are divided into: rural districts, district-level towns, and provincial cities. Centrally-controlled cities are divided into urban districts, rural districts, district-level towns, and equivalent administrative units;
3. Rural districts are divided into communes and commune-level towns. District-level towns and provincial cities are divided into wards and communes. Urban districts are divided into wards.
4. Special administrative-economic units are established by the National Assembly.

In the 2015 Law on Organization of Local Administration (amended and supplemented in 2019), Article 2: Administrative Units, Chapter I: General Provisions, stipulates:

The administrative units of the Socialist Republic of Vietnam include:

1. Provinces, centrally-controlled cities (hereinafter collectively referred to as provincial-level);
2. Rural districts, urban districts, district-level towns, provincial cities, cities within centrally-controlled cities (hereinafter collectively referred to as district-level);
3. Communes, wards, commune-level towns (hereinafter collectively referred to as commune-level);
4. Special administrative-economic units.

On June 16, 2025, the National Assembly issued Resolution No. 203/2025/QH15 on Amending and Supplementing a Number of Articles of the Constitution of the Socialist Republic of Vietnam. This resolution takes effect from July 1, 2025. Accordingly:

Article 110 is amended and supplemented as follows:

1. The administrative units of the Socialist Republic of Vietnam are organized into two levels. These levels include provinces and centrally-controlled cities, and administrative units below provinces and centrally-controlled cities as prescribed by law;
2. Special administrative-economic units are established by the National Assembly;
3. The establishment, dissolution, merger, division, and adjustment of administrative unit boundaries must solicit opinions from the local People. This process must follow the procedures prescribed by the National Assembly.

Article 111 is amended and supplemented as follows:

1. Local government is organized in the administrative units of the Socialist Republic of Vietnam;
2. Local government levels consist of People's Councils and People's Committees. These are organized in administrative units appropriate to rural, urban, and island characteristics, as prescribed by the National Assembly;
3. The local government in a special administrative-economic unit is prescribed by the National Assembly when that special administrative-economic unit is established.

== List of special zones in Vietnam ==
| No. | Special zone | Under province, city | Area (km^{2}) | Population (people) | Population density (people/km^{2}) | Established | | | | | | |
|---|---|---|---|---|---|---|---|---|---|---|---|---|
| No. | Special zone | 1 | Area (km^{2}) | Population (people) | Population density (people/km^{2}) | Established | Vân Đồn | Quảng Ninh | 583.92 | 53,904 | 92 | 2025-06-16 |
| 2 | Cô Tô | 53.68 | 7,151 | 133 | | | | Quảng Ninh | | | | 2025-06-16 |
| 3 | Bạch Long Vĩ | Haiphong | 3.07 | 686 | 223 | 2025-06-16 | | | | | | |
| 4 | Cát Hải | Haiphong | 286.98 | 71,211 | 248 | 2025-06-16 | | | | | | |
| 5 | Cồn Cỏ | Quảng Trị | 2.3 | 139 | 60 | 2025-06-16 | | | | | | |
| 6 | Lý Sơn | Quảng Ngãi | 10.40 | 25,639 | 2,465 | 2025-06-16 | | | | | | |
| 7 | Hoàng Sa | Da Nang | 305 | 0 | 0 | 2025-06-16 | | | | | | |
| 8 | Trường Sa | Khánh Hòa | | | | 2025-06-16 | | | | | | |
| 9 | Phú Quý | Lâm Đồng | 18.02 | 32,268 | 1,790 | 2025-06-16 | | | | | | |
| 10 | Côn Đảo | Ho Chi Minh City | 75.79 | 6,143 | 81 | 2025-06-16 | | | | | | |
| 11 | Kiên Hải | An Giang | 24.75 | 23,179 | 936 | 2025-06-16 | | | | | | |
| 12 | Phú Quốc | An Giang | 575.29 | 157,629 | 273 | 2025-06-16 | | | | | | |
| 13 | Thổ Châu | An Giang | 13.98 | 1,896 | 135 | 2025-06-16 | | | | | | |
