= Cô Tô =

Cô Tô Đặc khu Cô Tô
- Special administrative zone
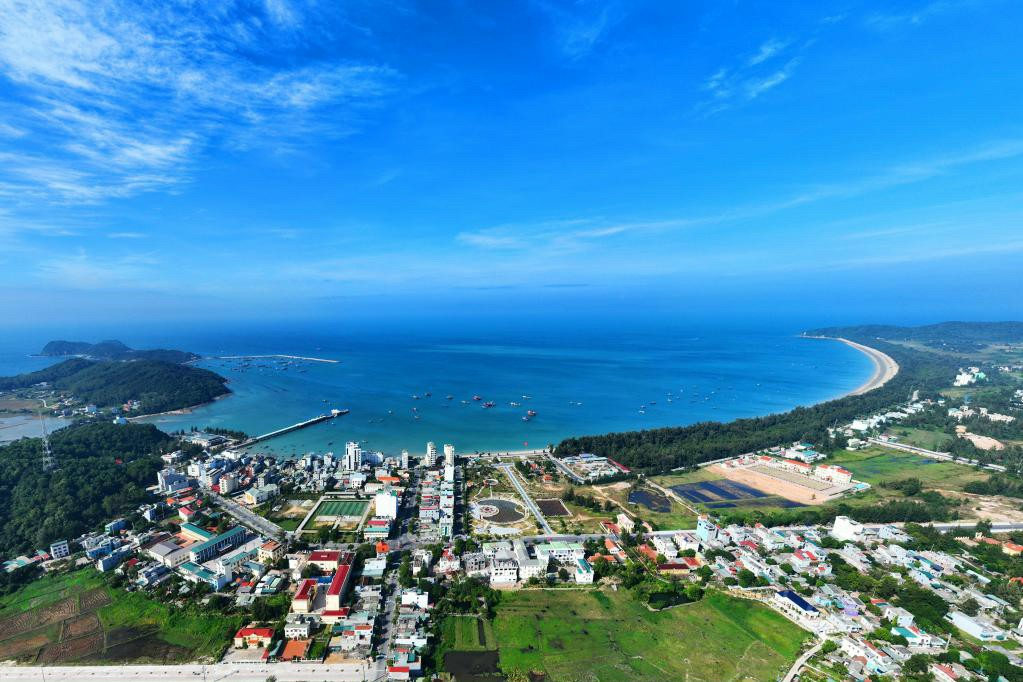
- Cô Tô port on Cô Tô Lớn island

- Seal

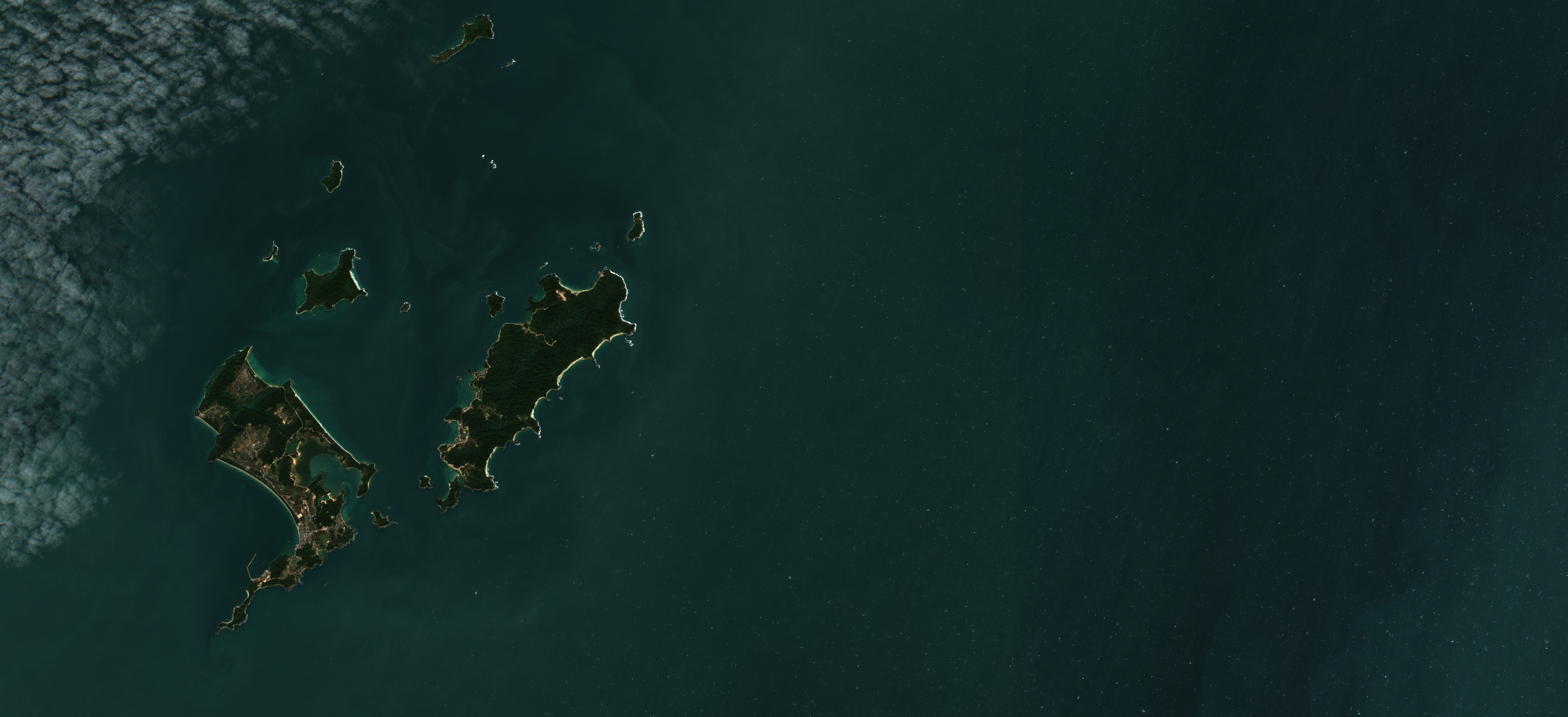
- Satellite image of Cô Tô
- Interactive map of Cô Tô
- Location within Vietnam Location within Southeast Asia Location within Asia
- Country: Vietnam
- Region: Northeast
- City: Quảng Ninh
- Founded: March 23, 1994
- Capital: Cô Tô

Government
  - Chairman of the People's Committee: Nguyễn Việt Dũng

Area
  - Total: 18.3 sq mi (47.3 km^{2})

Population (2022)
  - Total: 6,778
  - Density: 330/sq mi (126/km^{2})
- Time zone: UTC+7 (UTC + 7)
- Website: cototourism.vn

Cô Tô is an archipelago and a special administrative zone of Quảng Ninh in the northeastern region of Vietnam. As of 2019, the Cô Tô district had a population of 6,285, which is the lowest-population subdivision in Quảng Ninh. Cô Tô covers an area of 47.3 km^{2}. The district capital lies at Cô Tô.

== History ==
Cô Tô which has the ancient name Chang Son (Chang Mountain), has long been the residence of fishermen's boats in the Northeast but has not yet become a settlement because it was always harassed by Chinese pirates.

Under the Nguyễn dynasty, the population here became more crowded; most emigrated from China. Later, the island was occupied by French colonialists. In the middle of the 20th century, France withdrew. After that, the Chinese also returned home, the population on the island was only 10%, causing all production activities to decline.

On March 23, 1994, the government changed the name of Cam Pha district to Vân Đồn district and split the Cô Tô archipelago into two communes Thanh Lan and Cô Tô to establish the Cô Tô district.

In 2006, the population of the Cô Tô district was 5,240 people with 1,178 households. Since 1994 until now, the state has had many supportive policies on electricity prices, petrol prices, construction and upgrading of infrastructure, and the daily passenger train Vân Đồn - Cô Tô, improving people's life in this area. This is constantly improving.

On October 16, 2013, Cô Tô officially got electricity from the national grid when the project of bringing electricity to the island was completed, worth 1,106 billion VND.

After nearly 30 years of construction and development, by the end of 2022, the whole district has 1,957 households with 6,778 people from 13 ethnic groups and 14 provinces to live, build and develop the economy.

== Geography ==
Cô Tô has 71 large and small islands, of which the three largest islands are Cô Tô Lớn, Thanh Lan, and Tran. Cô Tô Island and Thanh Lan Island are located close to each other and together with smaller neighboring islands form the Cô Tô archipelago.

Cô Tô sea area has a geographical location:

The East and the South border the waters of the Gulf of Tonkin

The West borders the sea area of the Vân Đồn district

The North borders the sea area of Hải Hà district and Móng Cái City.

The district has an area of 53.68 km, the population in 2022 is 6778 people, and the population density reaches 126 people/km².

== Climate ==
Climate data for Cô Tô
Month	Jan	Feb	Mar	Apr	May	Jun	Jul	Aug	Sep	Oct	Nov	Dec	Year
Mean daily maximum °C (°F)	17.6 (63.7)	18.0 (64.4)	20.7 (69.3)	25.3 (77.5)	29.5 (85.1)	30.8 (87.4)	31.2 (88.2)	30.9 (87.6)	30.2 (86.4)	27.9 (82.2)	24.1 (75.4)	20.1 (68.2)	25.5 (77.9)
Daily mean °C (°F)	15.1 (59.2)	15.5 (59.9)	18.1 (64.6)	22.3 (72.1)	26.3 (79.3)	28.2 (82.8)	28.6 (83.5)	28.2 (82.8)	27.5 (81.5)	25.2 (77.4)	21.5 (70.7)	17.5 (63.5)	22.8 (73.0)
Mean daily minimum °C (°F)	13.6 (56.5)	13.9 (57.0)	16.5 (61.7)	20.5 (68.9)	24.4 (75.9)	26.3 (79.3)	26.7 (80.1)	26.1 (79.0)	25.4 (77.7)	23.4 (74.1)	19.9 (67.8)	15.9 (60.6)	21.0 (69.8)
Average precipitation mm (inches)	28.5 (1.12)	24.8 (0.98)	40.8 (1.61)	76.2 (3.00)	145.4 (5.72)	227.6 (8.96)	311.7 (12.27)	386.6 (15.22)	333.2 (13.12)	117.4 (4.62)	50.3 (1.98)	31.9 (1.26)	1,774.4 (69.86)
Average rainy days	8.1	9.6	14.2	13.1	13.6	14.7	15.5	15.7	11.7	8.9	6.3	5.1	137.9
Average relative humidity (%)	82.4	87.6	89.7	89.4	87.5	86.8	85.3	85.8	81.8	77.9	75.4	77.6	84.0
Mean monthly sunshine hours	88.3	44.2	56.4	99.4	200.7	186.0	226.5	184.2	197.3	192.3	170.9	129.8	1,772.1
Source: Vietnam Institute for Building Science and Technology

=== Resources - environment ===
Cô Tô has a mountainous terrain. The peak adjacent to Cap Chau on Thanh Lan Island is 210 m high, and the top of the big Cô Tô Island meteorological station is 160 m high. The part between the islands is high, surrounded by low mountains and narrow fields, along the island are small sandy beaches and coves. The soil is mainly ferret on sandstone.

Forest land covers an area of 2,200 ha, Co To's agricultural land (771 ha) accounts for 20% of the natural land area, of which half are capable of cultivating rice and growing crops, nearly half are capable of grazing cattle, and other crops plant fruit trees.

Cô Tô has few rivers and streams, dammed to form 11 small lakes. Abundant groundwater has good quality. The flora on the islands is quite rich and diverse. Diverse natural forest with many types of good wood.

The planted forest includes some species of trees such as casuarina, eucalyptus, and horsetail pine. Thanh Lan Island also has oranges, tangerines, and bananas that have become famous products in the province for many years. There are many rare medicinal herbs on all islands.

The fishing profession of shrimp, fish, squid ... in Cô Tô island has been exhausted, so many types of seafood are prohibited from exploitation.

== Tourism ==
=== President Ho Chi Minh memorial site on Cô Tô Island ===
President Ho Chi Minh once visited Cô Tô in 1961. In 1962, when he visited the Northeast, the Hai Ninh Provincial Administrative Committee asked for permission to erect a statue on Cô Tô island, build a memorial house, set up beer in the places he visited, and got consent from Uncle Ho. This place is the pride of the island district; a historical milestone affirming the sacred sovereignty of the country, giving islanders pride, faith, and determination to stick with the sea.

=== Mong Rong Stone Beach ===
There is a sedimentary rock system that has been eroded over thousands of years by seawater.

=== Van Chay Beach ===
Unlike other beaches, this place retains the inherent wild features, a clean and peaceful blue beach.

=== Tinh Yeu Beach ===
The beach attracts the most tourists because it is located near the town center, with many shops, houses, and densely populated areas, so it is well known to many people. Near the beach, there is a monument of Uncle Ho. The coastline is nearly 7 km long with white sand, and smooth, clear water. On the beach side, there is a row of green pine trees, and a paved road running along the coast.

=== Cô Tô Con Island ===
The small island is located 7 km from Cô Tô town, where there is a primeval forest containing many rare animals, in the sea containing many coral reefs.

=== Cô Tô Lighthouse ===
Cô Tô lighthouse is located on a mountain about 5 km from the town, is the highest point of the island. This building was built in the late 19th century. The road from the foot of the mountain to the lighthouse is winding under the dense forest foliage.

=== Au Port ===
As a place where ships on the sea can anchor to avoid storms, Au Port has many giant concrete pillars.

== Administrative divisions ==
Currently, the district has 3 commune-level administrative units including Cô Tô town and 2 communes Thanh Lan and Dong Tien. The whole district has 13 villages and zones, of which: 5 villages belong to Dong Tien commune, 4 villages belong to Thanh Lan commune and 4 areas belong to Cô Tô town.
