= Vĩnh Gia =

Coordinates: 10°30′14″N 104°48′36″E

- Rural commune and village
- Interactive map of Vĩnh Gia
- Country: Vietnam
- Province: An Giang
- Time zone: UTC+07:00 (Indochina Time)

Vĩnh Gia is a rural commune (xã) and village of An Giang Province, Vietnam.
