= Ô Lâm =

Coordinates: 10.3517°N 104.9780°E

- Rural commune and village
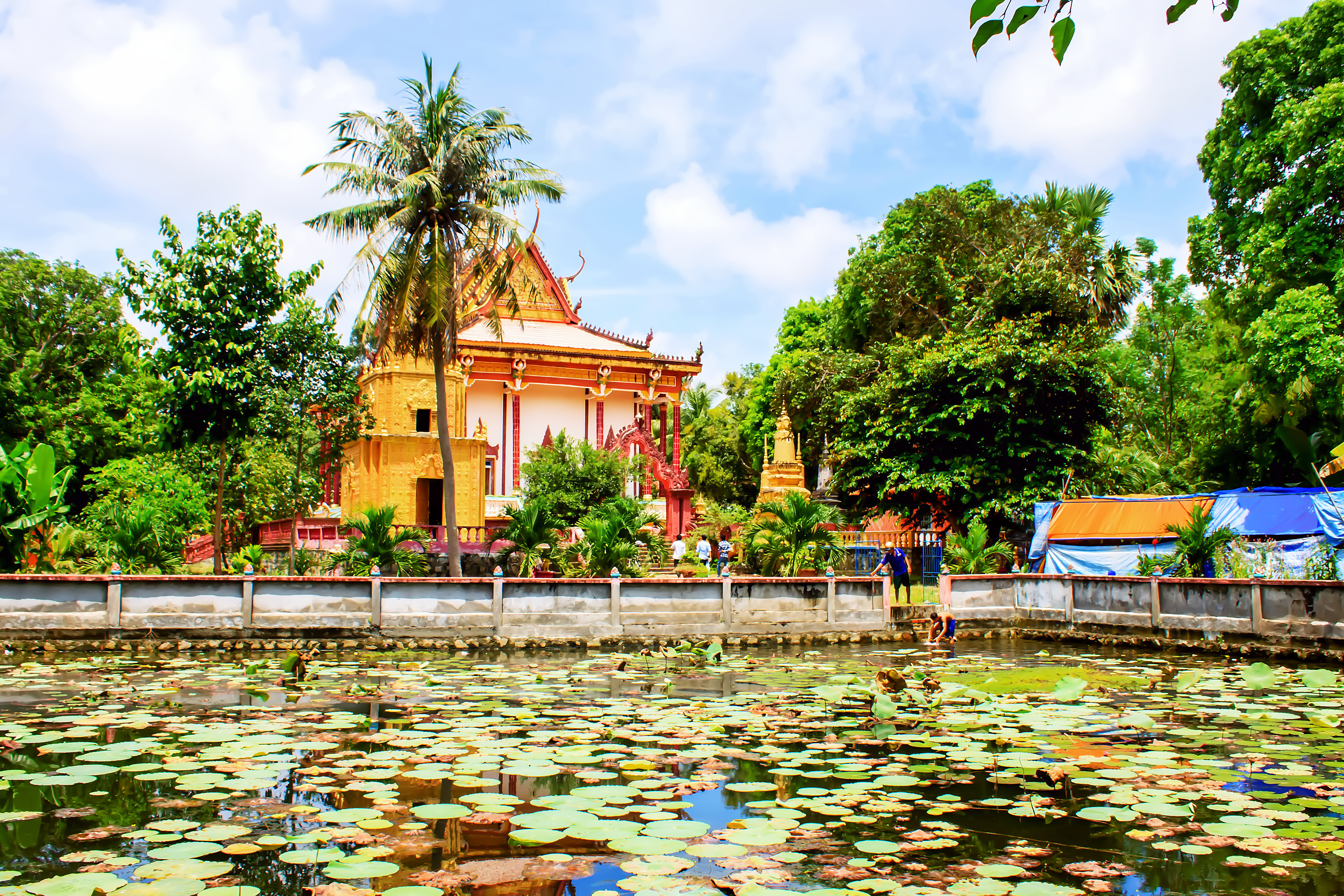
- Tà Miệt Pagoda
- Interactive map of Ô Lâm
- Country: Vietnam
- Province: An Giang

Area
  - Total: 38.42 sq mi (99.52 km^{2})

Population (December 31, 2024)
  - Total: 37,429
  - Density: 974.1/sq mi (376.1/km^{2})
- Time zone: UTC+07:00 (Indochina Time)
- Administrative code: 30577
- Website: http://olam.angiang.gov.vn/

Ô Lâm is a rural commune (xã) and village in An Giang Province, Vietnam.

== Administration ==
Ô Lâm is divided into six hamlets: Phước Long, Phước Lộc, Phước Bình, Phước Thọ, Phước Lợi, and Phước An.
