= Cô Tô, An Giang =

Cô Tô
- Commune
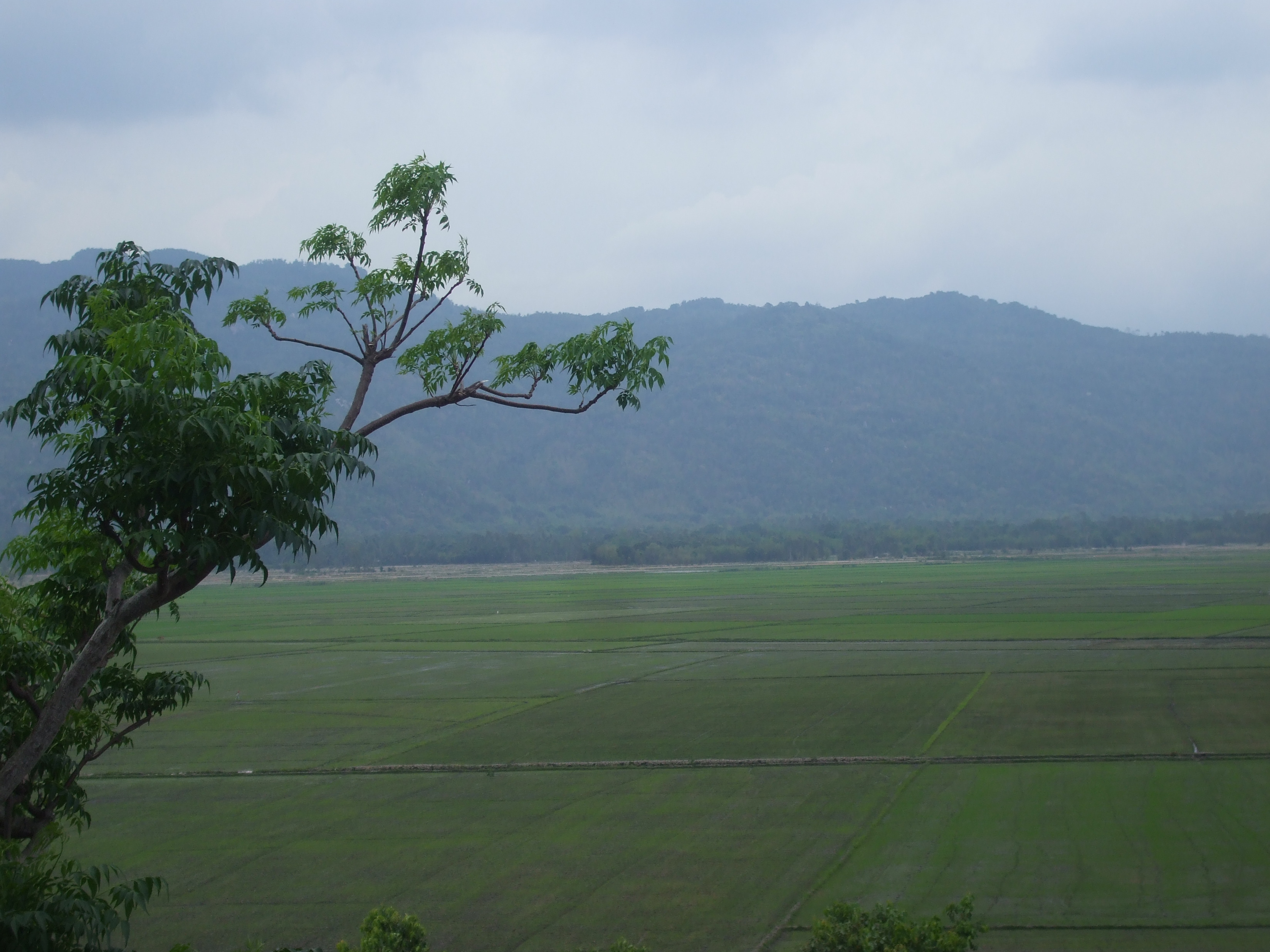

- Location in Vietnam
- Coordinates: 10°23′N 105°1′E
- Country: Vietnam
- Province: An Giang
- Establish: June 16, 2025

Government
  - Type: People's Committee of Cô Tô commune
- Time zone: UTC+07:00 (Indochina Time)

Cô Tô is a commune (xã) and village of An Giang province, Vietnam.

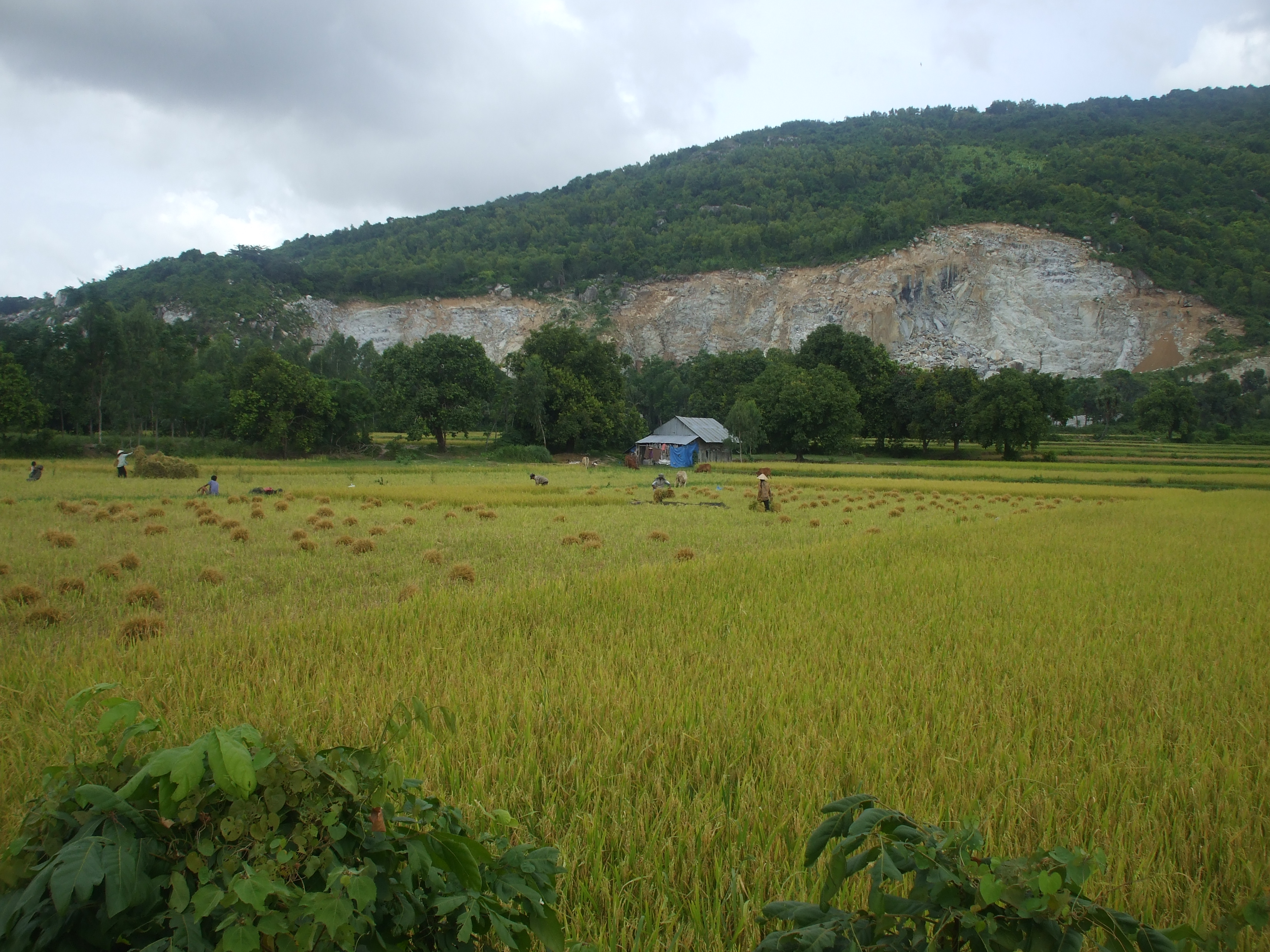
