= Cô Tô Island =

Island in Quảng Ninh province, Vietnam

Coordinates: 20.991°N 107.756°E

Cô Tô
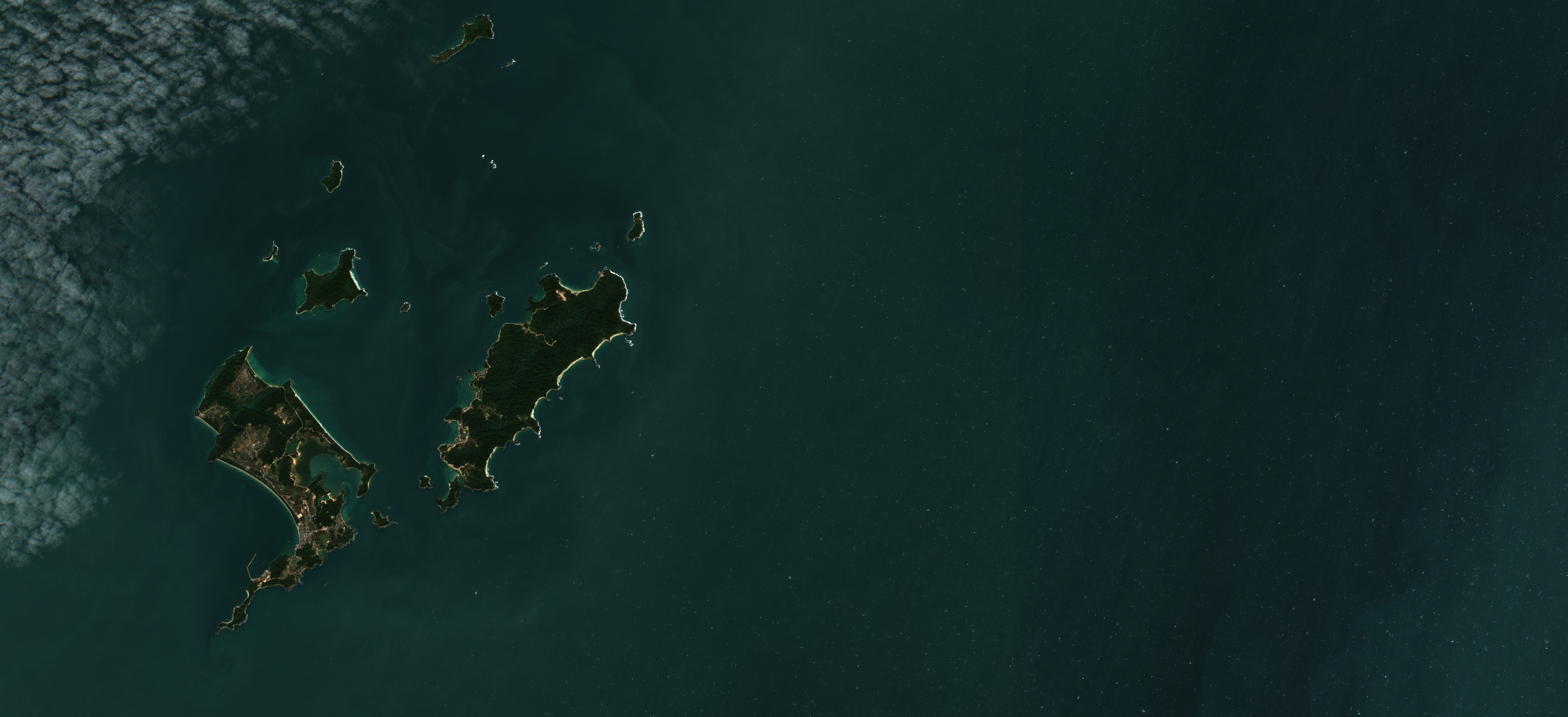
- Cô Tô is the largest island of the Cô Tô archipelago
- Interactive map of Cô Tô

Geography
- Location: Gulf of Tonkin

Administration
- Vietnam
- Province: Quảng Ninh province

Demographics
- Ethnic groups: Vietnamese people

Cô Tô is an island in Cô Tô special zone, Quảng Ninh province, Vietnam.

== Overview ==
Cô Tô is a small island with a population over 4,000. It is a well known tourist destination.

== Beaches ==
The island has three beaches – Van Chay beach, Hong Van beach and Bac Van Beach.
