= Vân Đồn =

Coordinates: 21°04′19″N 107°25′28″E

Vân Đồn Đặc khu Vân Đồn
- Special administrative region
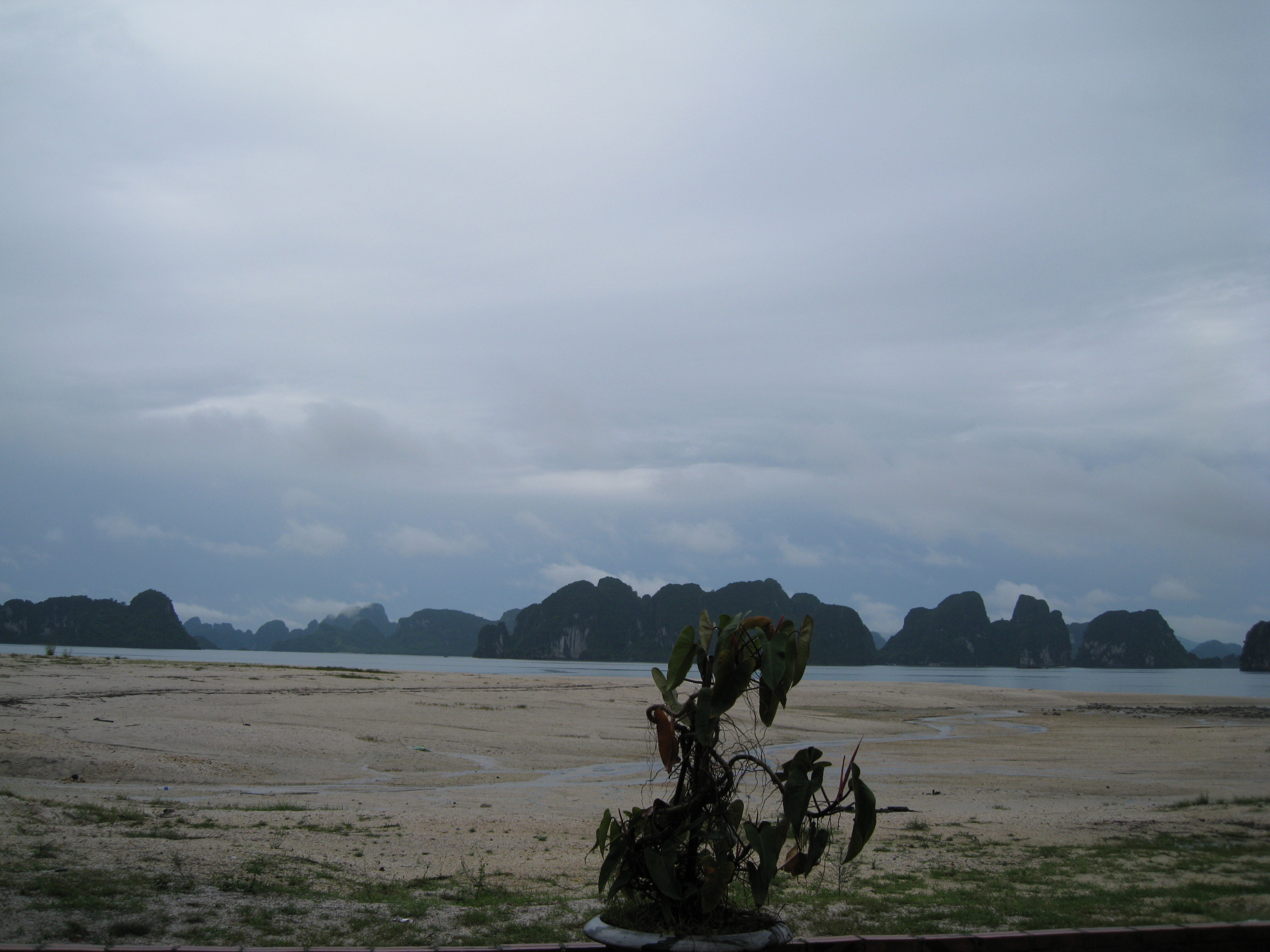
- Quan Lạn Island

- Seal

- Location within Vietnam Location within Southeast Asia Location within Asia
- Country: Vietnam
- Region: Northeast
- City: Quảng Ninh
- Founded: December 26, 1948: establishment of Cẩm Phả district'; March 23, 1994: renamed the district Vân Đồn
- Capital: Cái Rồng

Government
  - Chairman of the People's Committee: Bùi Văn Cẩn
  - Chairman of the People's Council: Nguyễn Hải Lý
  - Secretary: Đoàn Văn Chỉnh

Area
  - Special administrative region: 224.6 sq mi (581.8 km^{2})

Population (2019)
  - Special administrative region: 46,616
  - Density: 210/sq mi (80/km^{2})
  - Urban: 9,520
- Time zone: UTC+07:00 (Indochina Time)
- Website: vandon.quangninh.gov.vn

Vân Đồn is a special administrative region of Quảng Ninh in the Northeast region of Vietnam. As of 2019 the region had a population of 46,616. The region covers an area of 551 km^{2}. The region capital lies at Cái Rồng. The region is selected as a Special Economic Zone, and is rapidly being developed. It is connected by motorway to Hai Phong and Hạ Long, and served by Van Don International Airport.

== History ==
The name Vân Đồn stems from the Vân Mountain on Quan Lạn Island, Quang Ninh province, Vietnam. In AD 980, the early Lê dynasty of Vietnam (980–1009) set up an army outpost there. In 1149 under the reign of Lý Anh Tông (1138–1175), the Vân Đồn island authority was officially formed as a strategic location, at the same time as a busy trading port of Đại Việt. The port was bustling under the dynasties of Lý (1009–1225), Trần (1225–1400), and later Lê (1442–1789) hosting trading ships from other countries.

Vân Đồn is also home to various historical sites representing important events in the Vietnamese national fight against foreign invaders. In 1288, on the Mang River on Quan Lạn Island, under the command of General Trần Khánh Dư, the Vietnamese troops defeated Yuan-Mongol invaders in the historic Bạch Đằng victory.

== Administrative divisions ==
Cái Rồng, Đông Xá, Hạ Long, Bình Dân, Đoàn Kết, Đài Xuyên, Vạn Yên, Minh Châu, Quan Lạn, Ngọc Vừng, Bản Sen, Thắng Lợi.
