= Bạch Long Vĩ =

Rural district of Haiphong, Vietnam (island)

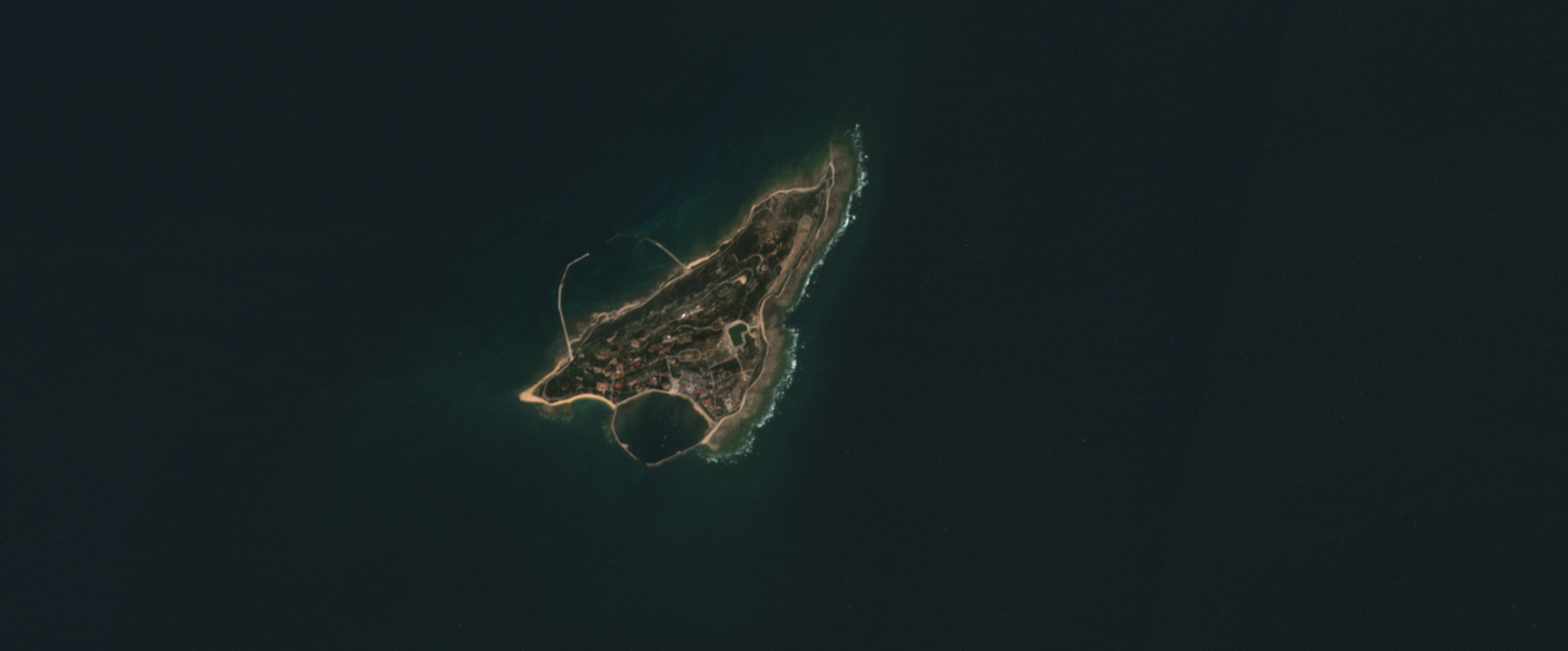
- Satellite image of Bạch Long Vĩ island

- Location in Vietnam
- Interactive map of Bạch Long Vĩ

Geography
- Location: Gulf of Tonkin
- Coordinates: 20°08′00″N 107°43′40″E
- Area: 3.045 km^{2} (1.176 sq mi)

Administration
- Vietnam
- City: Haiphong
- Special zone: Bạch Long Vĩ special administrative zone

Demographics
- Population: 1000 (2023)
- Pop. density: 328/km^{2} (850/sq mi)
- Ethnic groups: Vietnamese people

Bạch Long Vĩ is an island located in the Gulf of Tonkin, about halfway between Haiphong (Vietnam) and Hainan Island (China). The island is an offshore special administrative zone of Haiphong city. Fishing comprises the majority of economic activity in the Gulf of Tonkin, and Bạch Long Vĩ is a major nursery and harvesting area for fish eggs. More than 50 species of commercial fish are abundant in the area (ADB 1999).

== Name ==
In Vietnamese, "Bạch Long Vĩ" (chữ Hán: 白龍尾) means "The Tail of the White Dragon" - the former name of a peninsula ((mũi Bạch Long Vĩ / Cape Pak-lung) now known as the Bailong Peninsula (白龙半島) in Fangchenggang, Guangxi, China) before the French-Qing convention (1887). Before the 20th century, the island used to be called "Vô Thủy" which means "no water" since there was no water source on the island.

According to Li Dechao, before the 1950s, Nightingale Island (Yeying Is.; Chinese: 夜莺岛; Pinyin: Yèyīng Dǎo) is the former toponym of Bạch Long Vĩ Island. Fushui Isle (Chinese: 浮水洲; Pinyin: Fúshǔi Zhōu; Vietnamese: "Phù Thủy Châu" meaning "pearl floating on water") is the name used among both Danzhou Hainan Chinese and Vietnamese fishermen.

== Geography ==
Bạch Long Vĩ sits 58 meters (190 ft) above sea level, and is a plateau. There are no other significant exposed land masses within 75 km (47 mi) of the island.

On the tectonic-structure framework, Bạch Long Vĩ island is located on a local uplifted block in a northeast–southwest direction belonging to the northwest flank of the Song Hong Cenozoic sedimentary basin, closed by the east with the basin of the Northern Gulf of Tonkin. Previously, Bach Long Vi Island was thought to have only Neogene sedimentary rocks, now it is known to have Paleogene sedimentary rocks. The island is composed of sedimentary rocks of sandstone, siltstone and claystone from the Phù Thủy Châu formation of Oligocene age with a thickness of about 200 m (660 ft), and the Hoa Mi formation from the middle Miocene–Pliocene with a thickness about 55 to 60 m (180 to 197 ft).

== Climate ==
Climate data for Bạch Long Vĩ
Month	Jan	Feb	Mar	Apr	May	Jun	Jul	Aug	Sep	Oct	Nov	Dec	Year
Mean daily maximum °C (°F)	19.7 (67.5)	19.4 (66.9)	21.5 (70.7)	25.5 (77.9)	29.1 (84.4)	30.6 (87.1)	31.1 (88.0)	30.8 (87.4)	29.7 (85.5)	27.6 (81.7)	24.7 (76.5)	21.6 (70.9)	25.9 (78.6)
Daily mean °C (°F)	17.2 (63.0)	17.1 (62.8)	19.0 (66.2)	22.7 (72.9)	26.5 (79.7)	28.4 (83.1)	28.9 (84.0)	28.5 (83.3)	27.5 (81.5)	25.5 (77.9)	22.5 (72.5)	19.2 (66.6)	23.6 (74.5)
Mean daily minimum °C (°F)	15.7 (60.3)	15.6 (60.1)	17.4 (63.3)	20.9 (69.6)	24.8 (76.6)	26.8 (80.2)	27.3 (81.1)	26.7 (80.1)	25.7 (78.3)	24.0 (75.2)	21.1 (70.0)	17.8 (64.0)	22.0 (71.6)
Average precipitation mm (inches)	27.5 (1.08)	19.8 (0.78)	26.8 (1.06)	48.1 (1.89)	93.3 (3.67)	139.5 (5.49)	149.6 (5.89)	255.6 (10.06)	219.1 (8.63)	110.7 (4.36)	36.7 (1.44)	21.6 (0.85)	1,149.1 (45.24)
Average rainy days	7.3	8.7	8.7	7.3	7.2	8.2	7.6	12.3	12.6	8.7	6.2	5.6	100.6
Average relative humidity (%)	84.5	89.1	90.8	91.0	89.2	86.8	84.7	85.3	83.8	80.9	78.9	79.3	85.5
Source: Vietnam Institute for Building Science and Technology

== History ==
Historically, before the 20th century, Bạch Long Vĩ island was not inhabited due to the lack of water resources.

In 1887, a convention between China (Qing dynasty) and France made the government cede the island to French Indochina (Annam Protectorate). According to Article 3 of this convention, Bạch Long Vĩ Island is located to the west of meridian 105° 43'East Paris (meridian 108° 03'13 "East Greenwich), and so belongs to sovereignty of Vietnam. However, this was not an acceptable result for China. In the contemporary published map of the Republic of China and other nations, this island still remained a part of China (Goode's World Atlas, Rand McNally, 1933). Also, some foreign scholars regarded that this island had been China's territory at least up to 1950.

Due to the lack of fresh water, until the end of the 19th century, Bạch Long Vĩ Island was uninhabited and was just a place for fishermen to avoid the strong wind at sea. Around 1920, a freshwater well was discovered in the south of the island. In August 1921, a resident of Giap Nam village, Co To county, Quang Yen province, made an application to be allowed to cultivate in the lowland area of Bạch Long Vĩ Island. Since then, the French protectorate had increased surveillance over the Bạch Long Vĩ and requested that the Department of Taxation's patrol boats departing from Co To Island must visit Bạch Long Vĩ at least once a year. In 1937, the Government of Emperor Bao Dai of Vietnam sent a squad of 12 men to form a garrison, established a village - commune (làng - xã) regime, appointed a village chief (Lý trưởng) on the island, and officially renamed the island as Bach Long Vi.

Administratively, the island was under the management of the head of Co To county, Quang Yen province. After that, the island village consisted of three residential clusters gathered in the southern part of the island, with about 75-80 houses, a population of about 200 people. The inhabitants of the island made their living by breeding, farming on the island and fishing around the island. There were about 25-50 fishing boats in Cat Ba Island, registered in September each year to go fishing in the southern waters of Bạch Long Vĩ, were allowed to anchor at the island to avoid monsoons. Most of the fish caught were transported to Cat Ba Island, a part was sold locally and a smaller part was sold to Hainan Island (China). Abalone was a valuable sea product that was bought by Chinese merchant boats and sold to Guangdong (China). However, later, there was an order that the exploited abalone could not be sold to China, but only sold in Vietnam.

During World War II, the Japanese army forced the French out of Indochina and seized the island in 1945. When the World War II ended, the Chiang Kai-shek army, as a representative for the Allies, disarmed the Japanese army in North Vietnam and captured Bach Long Vi island from the Japanese army.

In 1949, the Chinese Communist Party won the Chinese Civil War against Chiang Kai-shek's army.

In 1955 the People's Republic of China drove Chiang Kai-shek's army away and seized the island.

On January 16, 1957, China's government transferred the island to North Vietnam's government. On that day, the Prime Minister of Vietnam signed Decree Number 49/Ttg which stipulated that Bạch Long Vĩ island is a “xã” (village) and belongs to Haiphong city. That year a fish farm co-operative (Hợp tác xã Nông ngư), which had 93 workers and 22 hectares of land and 13 ships, was established on the island.

On December 9, 1992, the Vietnamese government signed Decree Number 15/NĐ/CP which stipulated that Bạch Long Vĩ island is a district belonging to Haiphong.

In the convention on the Gulf of Tonkin signed between the Vietnamese and Chinese governments, China respects the Vietnamese sovereignty over the island and there is no dispute over the island.

The core issue to be settled in the Gulf of Tonkin is which principle should be used in order to divide the Gulf. In this context, the impact of islands is of crucial importance and, in particular, the Vietnamese controlled Bach Long Vi Island. The first question is whether or not it qualifies as an island according to the provisions of the 1982 United Nations Law of the Sea Convention (1982 UNCLOS). If it does impact on the tracing of a line of equidistance if this principle is applied in the Gulf of Tonkin. Logically, Vietnam would take the position that Bach Long Vi Island should have its full impact in any agreement on how to divide the Gulf. On the other hand, China has an interest in minimising the impact that the Island would have on any agreed delimitation. This could be done by, either arguing that Bach Long Vi is not an island in accordance with the provisions of 1982 UNCLOS or, by arguing that its impact should be minimised and possibly even be disregarded. For China to argue that it is not an island would be counterproductive as China has earlier controlled the island and has claimed that the island was inhabited before it was handed-over to Vietnam in the late 1950s.

(The Management of the Border Disputes Between China and Vietnam and its Regional Implications by Assoc.Prof.Ramses Amer, Co-ordinator, South-East Asia Program (SEAP), Department of Peace and Conflict Research, Uppsala University, and Senior Research Adviser, Department of Research Co-operation-SAREC, Swedish International Development Co-operation Agency (SIDA), October 2000)

== Wildlife and biodiversity ==
The island is home to several species of migratory birds, including storks, turtle doves, drongos and swamphens. Local Vietnamese authorities have programs in place to protect these birds during their migratory season.

1,490 species of plants and animals have been discovered on and surrounding the island. Of these, there are 367 species of terrestrial plants; 17 species of mangroves; 227 species of marine phytoplankton; 65 species of seaweed; 1 species of seagrass; 110 species of marine zooplankton; 125 benthic species; 94 coral species; 451 species of marine fish; and groups of birds, mammals, amphibians and reptiles totalling 45 species. Bạch Long Vĩ Island and the waters around the island have listed 28 species of rare, threatened and endangered species, including two species of terrestrial plants in the genus Magnolia, 11 species of Coelenterata, 7 molluscan species and 8 species of vertebrate. Marine vertebrates include rorqual whales.

== Conservation issues ==
Due to its distance from the mainland, Bạch Long Vĩ is used as a base for offshore fishing. The marine resources in the immediate vicinity of the island are subject to over-harvesting and destructive fishing practices.

== Special administrative region ==
As part of the new plan to reorganize administrative units and introduce a two-tier local government system, all district-level units in Vietnam were dissolved. As a result, Bạch Long Vĩ was transformed into a special administrative zone.
