= Effects of Typhoon Yagi in Vietnam =

Typhoon Yagi Typhoon No. 3 of 2024
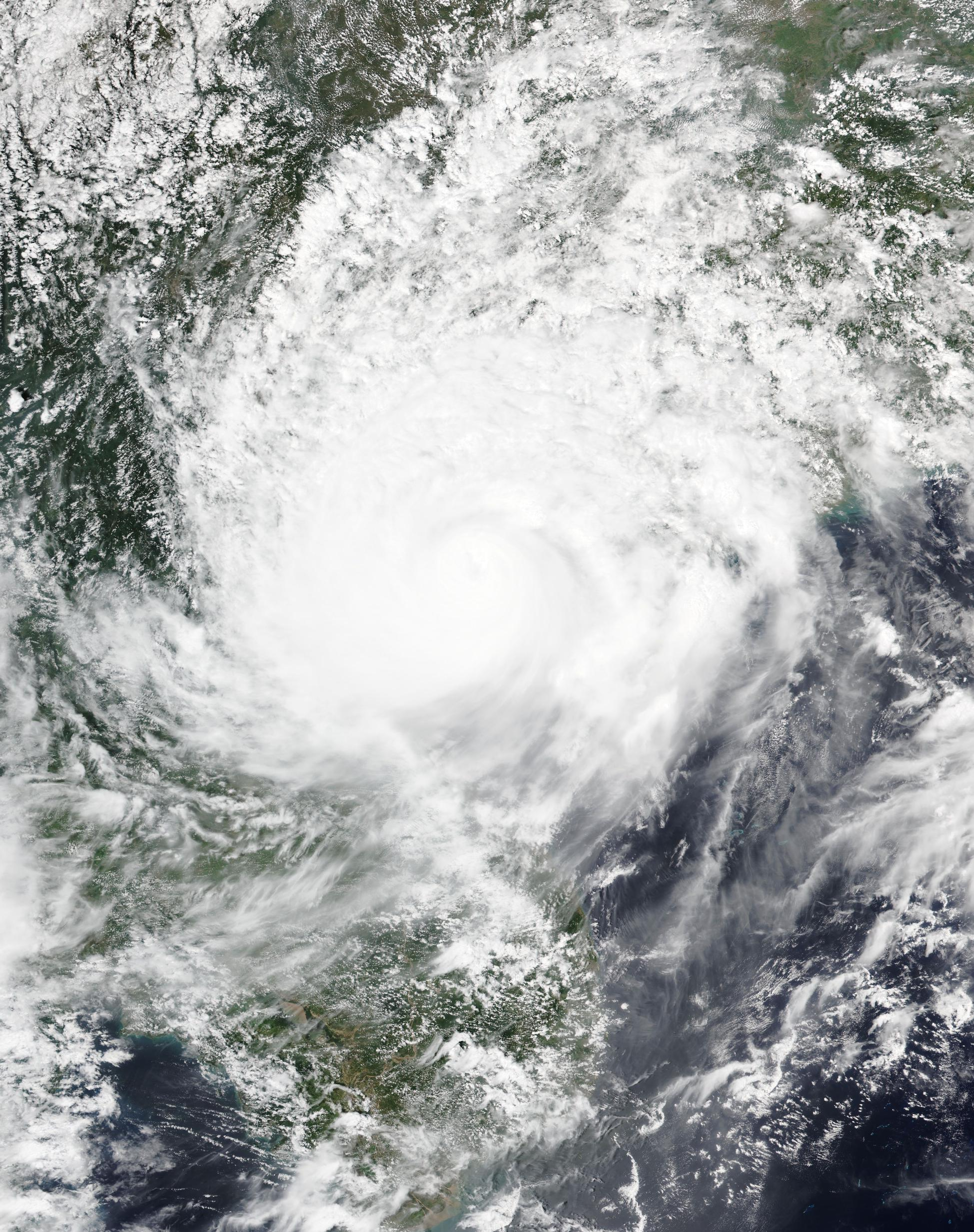
- Yagi making landfall in Haiphong and Quảng Ninh Province on 7 September

Meteorological history
- Duration: 7–9 September 2024

Very strong typhoon
- 10-minute sustained (JMA)
- Highest winds: 165 km/h (105 mph)
- Lowest pressure: 935 hPa (mbar); 27.61 inHg

Category 3-equivalent typhoon
- 1-minute sustained (SSHWS/JTWC)
- Highest winds: 205 km/h (125 mph)
- Lowest pressure: 943 hPa (mbar); 27.85 inHg

Typhoon
- 2-minute sustained (NCHMF)
- Highest winds: 180 km/h (110 mph) (Note: 160 km/h (99 mph) according to revised report. See Forecasting and assessment inconsistencies for context.)
- Highest gusts: 230 km/h (145 mph) (Note: 220 km/h (140 mph) according to revised report. See Forecasting and assessment inconsistencies for context.)
- Lowest pressure: <955.2 hPa (mbar); <28.21 inHg (Note: 955.2 hPa is the station pressure at Bãi Cháy, hence the lowest pressure would be lower than this number.)

Overall effects
- Fatalities: 323
- Injuries: 1,978
- Missing: 22
- Damage: $3.47 billion (2024 USD) (Costliest in Vietnamese history)
- Areas affected: Vietnam (particularly Northern Vietnam)
- Power outages: >6.1 million affected
- Part of the 2024 Pacific typhoon season

Typhoon Yagi, known in Vietnam as Typhoon No. 3 of 2024 (Vietnamese: Bão số 3 năm 2024), originated from a tropical depression northwest of Palau, entered the South China Sea, and rapidly intensified into a super typhoon. By 7 September, Yagi made landfall in Vietnam's Haiphong city and Quảng Ninh province, causing catastrophic damage to lives and property. The typhoon and post-typhoon severe weather brought strong winds and heavy rainfall to the entirety of northern Vietnam, triggering a series of adverse events such as flash floods and landslides in mountainous areas. It also resulted in historic floods in northern Vietnam.

The Vietnamese government assessed Typhoon Yagi as the "strongest in 30 years in the South China Sea" and "the strongest in 70 years on land," noting many "unprecedented characteristics." Government reports estimated that the typhoon and its subsequent floods caused property damages of 84.5 trillion VND (approximately US$3.47 billion) and resulted in over 300 deaths and disappearances. It is one of the costliest natural disasters in Vietnamese history.

== Preparations ==
Prior to Typhoon Yagi forming and making landfall in Vietnam, domestic media reported unusual weather patterns in August 2024. Speaking to the Natural Resources and Environment newspaper, Mai Văn Khiêm, Director of the National Center for Hydro-Meteorological Forecasting (NCHMF), stated that the country's average temperature reached 28.3 °C (82.9 °F), the highest in recorded history. Additionally, August 2024 marked only the sixth time in 61 years that no typhoons or tropical depressions occurred in the South China Sea, a highly unusual phenomenon. The Earth's atmospheric system had transitioned to a neutral state after sustaining El Niño conditions since May 2023. Forecasts indicated a shift to La Niña between September 2024 and early 2025. Khiêm predicted that the number of storms or tropical depressions would be around or above the annual average, with storms likely making landfall in central and southern Vietnam more frequently. The combination of high sea temperatures and La Niña was expected to create favorable conditions for the formation of stronger storms. On 27 August, the National Weather Service Climate Prediction Center of the United States updated its Weeks 2–3 Global Tropics Hazards Outlook, with a >60% probability of tropical cyclone formation for most of northern South China Sea and the north of Philippines.

The NCHMF predicted that Typhoon Yagi would make landfall in Vietnam between the areas in Quảng Ninh and Haiphong. In preparation, authorities advised against fishing in dangerous waters, holding outdoor events, and urged people to reinforce home defenses and inspect dykes, particularly at landing sites. Twelve northern provinces closed schools in anticipation of the storm, affecting over 6.5 million students, including those in Haiphong, Quảng Ninh, Bắc Giang, Nam Định, Thái Bình, Hanoi, Hà Nam, Phú Thọ, and Ninh Bình. Coastal areas from Quảng Ninh to Nghệ An banned boat operations, and around 310 domestic and international flights scheduled for 7 September were cancelled. Nearly 50,000 people were evacuated from northern coastal regions. Airports, including Nội Bài (Hanoi), Cát Bi (Haiphong), Vân Đồn (Quảng Ninh), and Thọ Xuân (Thanh Hóa), were asked to suspend operations on 7 September for specific periods. Various domestic media recommended using Google Maps to track the typhoon and receive updates.

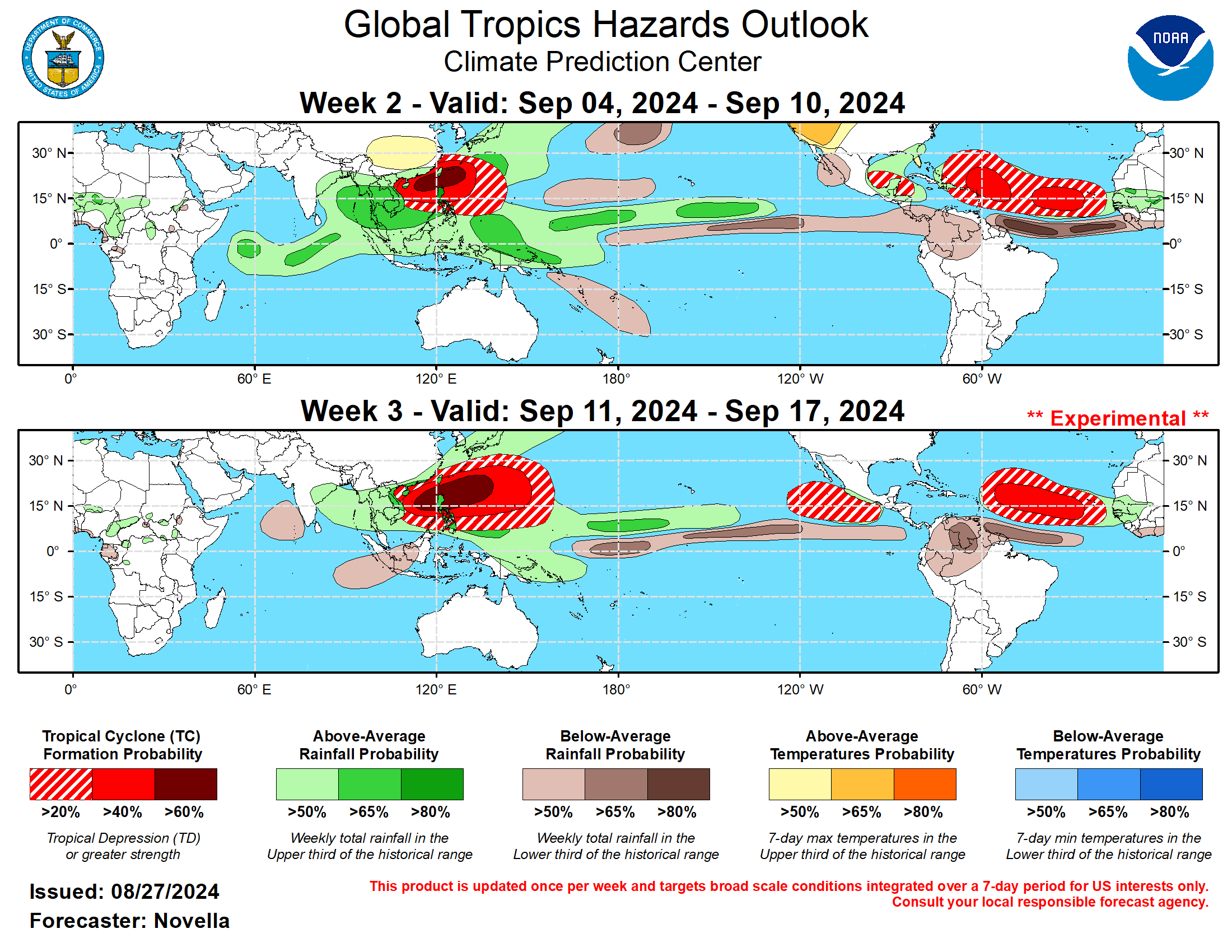
Weeks 2–3 Global Tropics Hazards Outlook issued on 27 August 2024, by the Climate Prediction Center, indicating a >60% probability of tropical cyclone formation for northern South China Sea and the north of Philippines.

For the first time in history, a disaster risk of Level 4/5 on Vietnam's disaster risk scale was issued for the Gulf of Tonkin. On the morning of 6 September, one day before the expected landfall, Prime Minister Phạm Minh Chính issued an urgent directive to provincial and city officials, as well as relevant ministers, to take immediate action to minimize the storm's impact. Ferry services between the mainland and Phú Quốc in southern Vietnam were also suspended starting 6 September. The Ministry of Industry and Trade instructed local authorities to stockpile essential supplies for five to ten days. Twelve rail routes in the North–south railway system were halted. The People's Army of Vietnam deployed 460,000 personnel to assist in disaster response. A friendly football match within the 2024 LPBank Cup between Thailand and Russia scheduled for 7 September at Mỹ Đình National Stadium in Hanoi was also cancelled.

According to VnExpress, before Typhoon Yagi made landfall in northern Vietnam, the National Committee for Disaster Response and Search and Rescue announced on the afternoon of 5 September that a total of 457,460 people had been mobilized to respond to the storm. This included 99,100 military personnel, 318,900 local militia, and 39,370 reserve forces. More than 10,100 vehicles, including 400 specialized vehicles, 4,770 cars, 4,940 boats, and 6 aircraft, were also mobilized. The Border Guard Command of the provinces along the South China Sea, from Quảng Ninh to Phú Yên, was tasked with coordinating with local authorities, families, and boat owners to notify and guide fishermen away from danger zones. To respond to the storm, the Prime Minister of Vietnam issued two official dispatches. Deputy Prime Minister Trần Hồng Hà also chaired a meeting on typhoon preparedness with representatives from 28 provinces and cities, urging the provinces to take decisive action against the storm with the motto "act without regret." It was also stated that strict accountability measures would be imposed on provincial leaders in case of negligence or complacency.

In inland regions, such as Hanoi’s outskirts and Thái Nguyên, police and local residents built flood barriers and worked on rice fields to prevent flooding both before and during the storm. Police in several districts instructed local police and other forces to implement safety measures for the people, vehicles, and property. During Yagi's landfall and subsequent damage, police officers from the affected communes and towns directly participated in rescue operations and supported people in dealing with the aftermath.

== Impact ==
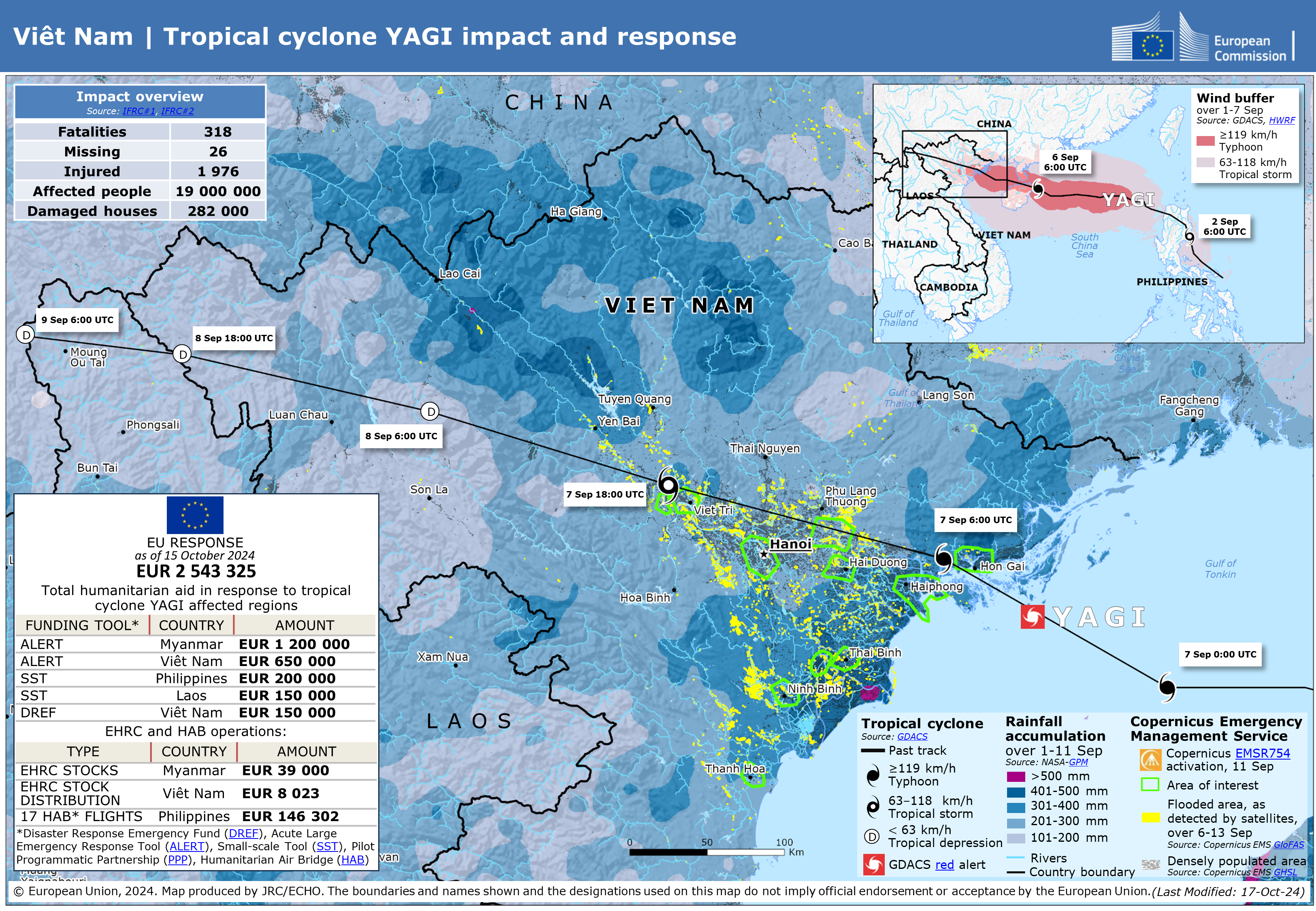
European Commission report on Typhoon Yagi's impact and response in Vietnam

Typhoon Yagi made landfall in Quảng Ninh at approximately 13:00 (UTC+7) on 7 September 2024. According to the first iteration of Vietnam's Member Report submitted to the ESCAP/WMO Typhoon Committee for the 19th Integrated Workshop in Shanghai, China, the strongest winds recorded when Typhoon Yagi made landfall were at the Bãi Cháy meteorological station in Quảng Ninh, with maximum 2-minute sustained winds (Note: Vietnam observes sustained winds over a 2-minute period, compared to most other organizations where sustained winds are observed either over an 1-minute period or a 10-minute period.) of 50 m/s (180 km/h), equivalent to 15 bft (167–183 km/h), recorded at 13:21 local time. (Note: Unless otherwise noted, "X bft" in this article refers to the wind intensity based on Vietnam's extended variant of the Beaufort scale. Tropical storm-force winds are 8−11 bft, and typhoon-force winds are 12 bft and above. The extended Beaufort scale used in Vietnam is as follows: 0 bft: 0–0.2 m/s (<1 km/h); 1 bft: 0.3–1.5 m/s (1–5 km/h); 2 bft: 1.6–3.3 m/s (6–11 km/h); 3 bft: 3.4–5.4 m/s (12–19 km/h); 4 bft: 5.5–7.9 m/s (20–28 km/h); 5 bft: 8.0–10.7 m/s (29–38 km/h); 6 bft: 10.8–13.8 m/s (39–49 km/h); 7 bft: 13.9–17.1 m/s (50–61 km/h); 8 bft: 17.2–20.7 m/s (62–74 km/h); 9 bft: 20.8–24.4 m/s (75–88 km/h); 10 bft: 24.5–28.4 m/s (89–102 km/h); 11 bft: 28.5–32.6 m/s (103–117 km/h); 12 bft: 32.7–36.9 m/s (118–133 km/h); 13 bft: 37.0–41.4 m/s (134–149 km/h); 14 bft: 41.5–46.1 m/s (150–166 km/h); 15 bft: 46.2–50.9 m/s (167–183 km/h); 16 bft: 51.0–56.0 m/s (184–201 km/h); 17 bft: 56.1–61.2 m/s (202–220 km/h)) Hoàng Đức Cường, Deputy Director General of the Vietnam Meteorological and Hydrological Administration, said this was the first time Vietnam had ever recorded such violent winds on land. Bãi Cháy station also recorded a pressure of 955.2 hPa (28.21 inHg), the lowest pressure recorded during Yagi's landfall in Vietnam.

Additionally, stations on the islands of Bạch Long Vĩ and Cô Tô recorded typhoon-force winds of 13 bft. Other stations on the mainland and nearshore islands of Quảng Ninh and Haiphong recorded winds of 10–12 bft with gusts up to 12–15 bft; Hải Dương recorded winds of 10–13 bft, while Hưng Yên, Bắc Ninh, Bắc Giang, Vĩnh Phúc, and Thái Bình experienced gale-force winds of 8–9 bft with gusts reaching 9–12 bft (in Ba Lạt, Thái Bình, gusts reached 36 m/s (130 km/h), equivalent to 12 bft). Other areas in the northeastern region of Vietnam, including the capital city of Hanoi, reported winds of 6–7 bft.

List of stations in Vietnam that recorded tropical storm-force winds or above during Typhoon Yagi (Note: For Chí Linh, Nho Quan and Tam Đảo stations, gust speeds were inputted to be the same as sustained wind speeds in original data; it is unknown whether this is an error.)
Province/City	Station	Max. 2-min sustained wind speeds	Peak gusts
Quảng Ninh	Cô Tô	40 m/s (144 km/h) (13 bft)	56 m/s (202 km/h) (16 bft)
Quảng Ninh	Quảng Hà	18 m/s (65 km/h) (8 bft)	30 m/s (108 km/h) (11 bft)
Quảng Ninh	Đầm Hà	30.4 m/s (109 km/h) (11 bft)	40 m/s (144 km/h) (13 bft)
Quảng Ninh	Cửa Ông	33 m/s (119 km/h) (12 bft)	44 m/s (158 km/h) (14 bft)
Quảng Ninh	Bãi Cháy (Note: See Forecasting and assessment inconsistencies for context on the 50 m/s figure.)	50 m/s (180 km/h) (15 bft)	63 m/s (227 km/h) (>17 bft)
Quảng Ninh	Uông Bí	30 m/s (108 km/h) (11 bft)	45 m/s (162 km/h) (14 bft)
Quảng Ninh	Van Don International Airport	24.7 m/s (89 km/h) (10 bft)	38.1 m/s (137 km/h) (13 bft)
Haiphong	Bạch Long Vĩ	38.3 m/s (138 km/h) (13 bft)	47.2 m/s (170 km/h) (15 bft)
Haiphong	Hòn Dấu	25 m/s (90 km/h) (10 bft)	35 m/s (126 km/h) (12 bft)
Haiphong	Phù Liễn	29 m/s (104 km/h) (11 bft)	50 m/s (180 km/h) (15 bft)
Haiphong	Cát Hải	34.2 m/s (123 km/h) (12 bft)	42.8 m/s (154 km/h) (14 bft)
Haiphong	Cat Bi International Airport	25.7 m/s (93 km/h) (10 bft)	46.8 m/s (168 km/h) (15 bft)
Hải Dương	Chí Linh	40 m/s (144 km/h) (13 bft)	40 m/s (144 km/h) (13 bft)
Hải Dương	Hải Dương	26 m/s (94 km/h) (10 bft)	35 m/s (126 km/h) (12 bft)
Thái Bình	Thái Bình	9 bft	36 m/s (130 km/h) (12 bft)
Ninh Bình	Nho Quan	19 m/s (68 km/h) (8 bft)	19 m/s (68 km/h) (8 bft)
Tuyên Quang	Hàm Yên	18 m/s (65 km/h) (8 bft)	20 m/s (72 km/h) (8 bft)
Lạng Sơn	Mẫu Sơn	31 m/s (112 km/h) (11 bft)	38 m/s (137 km/h) (13 bft)
Vĩnh Phúc	Tam Đảo	23 m/s (83 km/h) (9 bft)	23 m/s (83 km/h) (9 bft)
Bắc Ninh	Bắc Ninh	20 m/s (72 km/h) (8 bft)	27 m/s (97 km/h) (10 bft)
Bắc Giang	Sơn Động	19 m/s (68 km/h) (8 bft)	27 m/s (97 km/h) (10 bft)
Bắc Giang	Lục Ngạn	9 bft	11 bft
Hưng Yên	Hưng Yên	19 m/s (68 km/h) (8 bft)	29 m/s (104 km/h) (11 bft)

The system caused widespread heavy rainfall across northern Vietnam and Thanh Hóa, with total rainfall from 7:00 am on 7 September to 7:00 am on 12 September (local time) ranging from 250–450 mm (9.8–17.7 in), and some locations exceeding 550–700 mm (22–28 in). This rainfall contributed to monthly totals in early September that were 4–6 times higher than annual averages at 83 of 84 measuring stations. In Yên Bái City, over 200 mm (7.9 in) of rain fell in just two hours. Due to the heavy rain, water levels in major river systems in northern Vietnam, including the Red River and Thái Bình River systems, rose rapidly, causing significant flooding in 20 out of 25 northern provinces from 8 to 15 September. Thao River's upstream section in Lào Cai surpassed the historical flood level of 1971 by 0.27 m (11 in). In Yên Bái, the Thao River's peak flood level also exceeded the historic 1968 level. Downstream, water levels on the Red River at the Hanoi station reached the highest levels in 20 years, peaking at 11.3 m on the morning of 12 September. In Hanoi's suburban areas, water levels exceeded Level 3 warning thresholds (on Vietnam's flood warning scale of 3 levels) on smaller rivers such as the Tích River and Bùi River, tributaries of the Đáy River.

Elsewhere, downstream regions like Hà Nam (Đáy River) and Ninh Bình (Hoàng Long River) also saw peak flood levels above Level 3 thresholds, leading to severe flooding. In Ninh Bình, provincial authorities issued an evacuation order on the afternoon of 12 September but rescinded it less than a day later. On the Thái Bình River system, the Cầu River's peak level at Thái Nguyên reached 28.9 m (1,140 in), exceeding Level 3 flood warning thresholds by 1.9 m (75 in). Similarly, the Cầu River at Bắc Ninh and the Thương River at Bắc Giang also surpassed Level 3 flood warning thresholds. In Hải Dương, peak levels on the Thái Bình River and Kinh Thầy River reached the highest levels in 28 years, exceeding Level 3 flood warning thresholds. At Phả Lại, the Thái Bình River peaked at 6.26 m (246 in) on the evening of 12 September, the highest since 2003. Large floods were also reported on other northern rivers such as the Ninh Cơ, Kinh Môn, Gùa, and Trà Lý Rivers. Some areas in Haiphong experienced storm surges, with water levels rising up to 0.5 m (20 in). Additionally, heavy rain caused water from upstream to flow into the Thác Bà Hydropower Reservoir, rapidly raising its water level to a "historic level" of 5,600 cubic metres per second (200,000 cu ft/s). The reservoir was forced to release water through three spillway gates. Authorities prepared for the possibility of breaching an auxiliary dam; however, as water levels subsided, this measure was avoided, and the Thác Bà Hydropower Plant remained safe. The Hòa Bình and Tuyên Quang reservoirs also opened two and eight spillway gates, respectively.

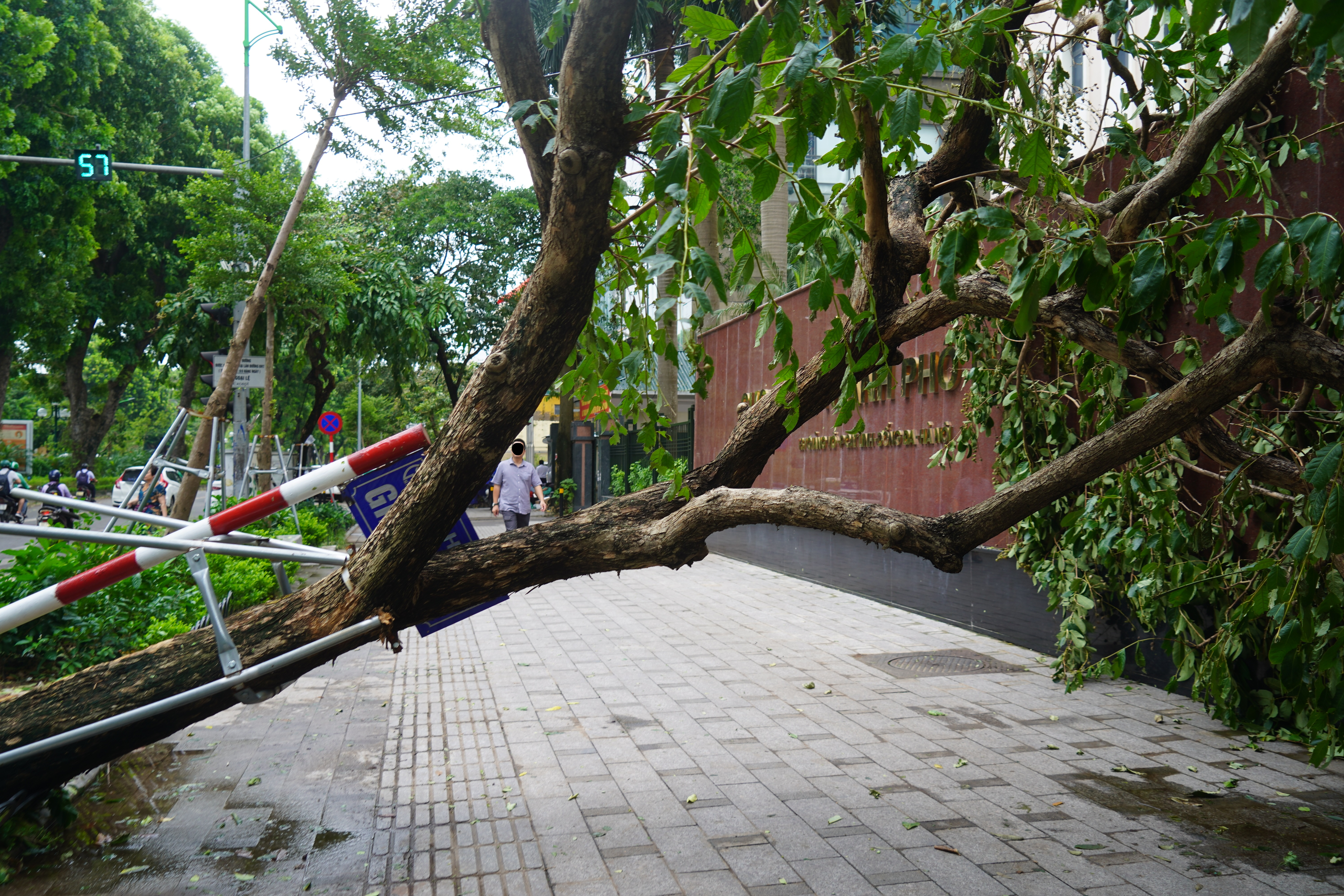
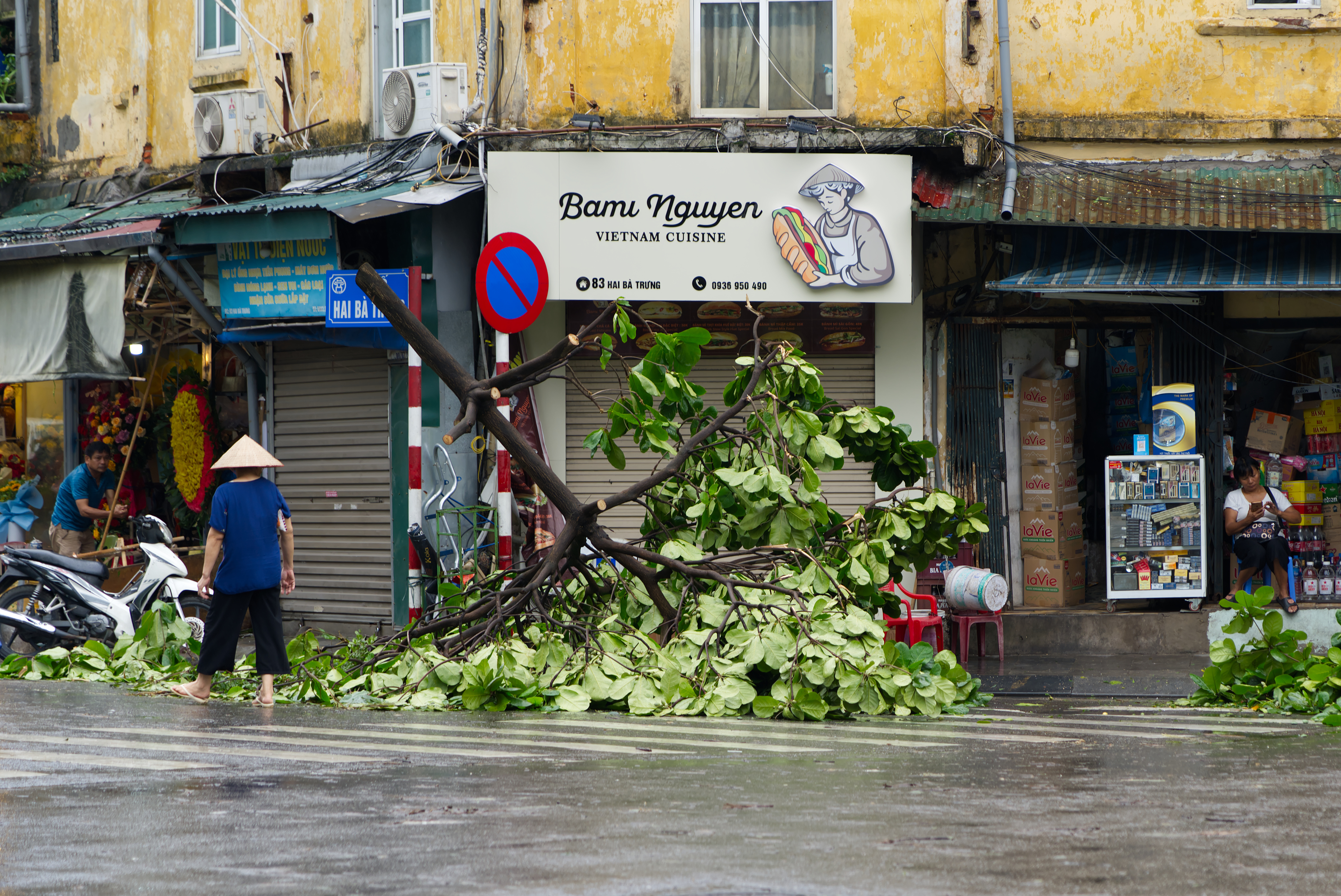
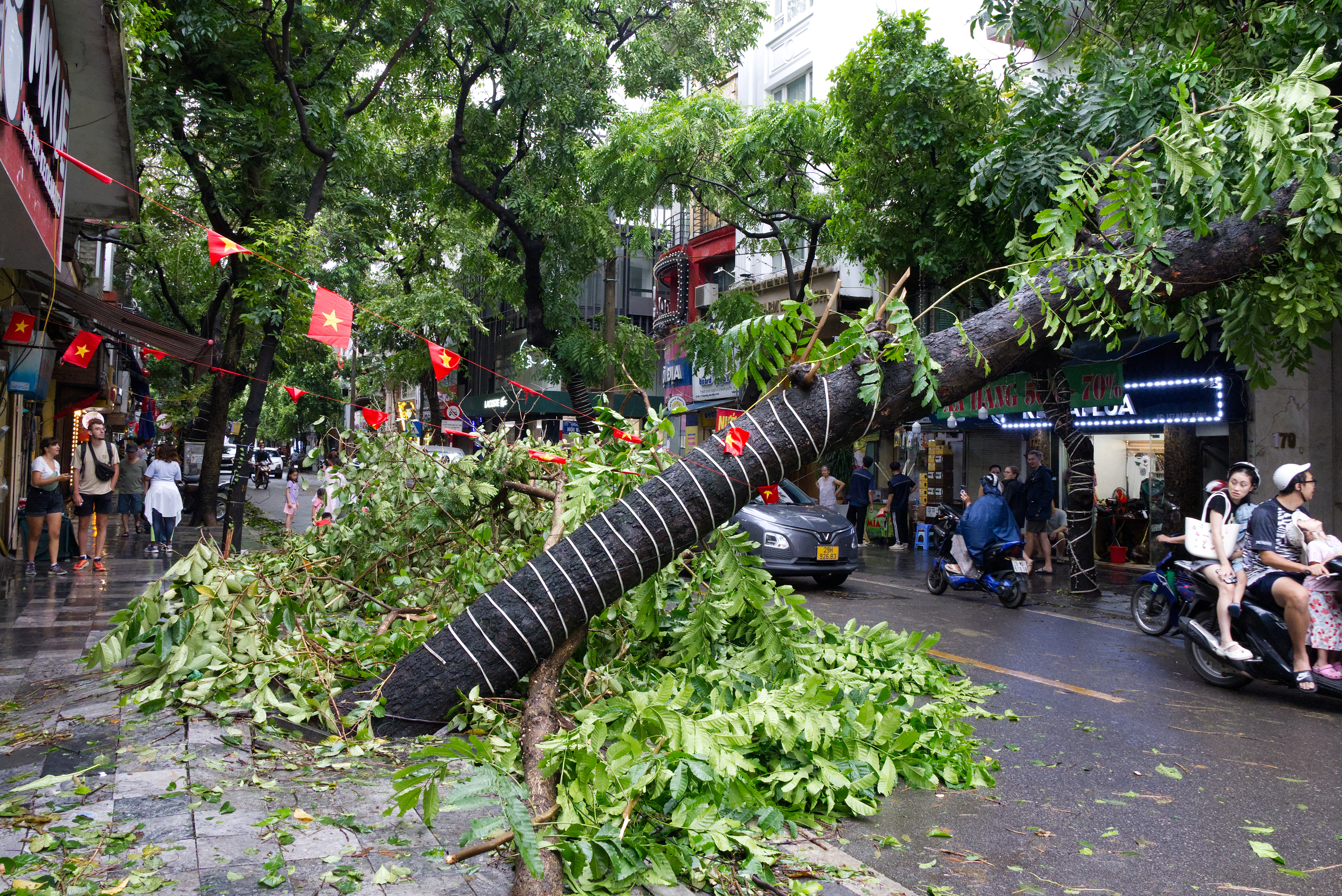
Downed trees in Hanoi due to Typhoon Yagi

=== Quảng Ninh province ===
Quảng Ninh province was significantly affected by Typhoon Yagi, with 29 fatalities recorded, and economic damages estimated at 28 trillion VND. Over 102,800 houses were unroofed, 254 houses collapsed, and nearly 5,000 houses were submerged or eroded. Additionally, 27 tourist boats, 116 fishing vessels, 126 cargo or passenger ships were sunk or capsized. More than 1,400 electricity poles were knocked down, leading to widespread power outages, and the telecommunications network was paralyzed. In Hạ Long, wind gusts of 17 bft or higher were recorded in some areas, such as Bãi Cháy (above 17 bft), resulting in economic damages of over 9.6 trillion VND. Vân Đồn district reported economic damages exceeding 3.693 trillion VND, suffering the most in terms of aquaculture losses, with approximately 32,000 tons of seafood and tens of thousands of tons of newly stocked oysters and fish destroyed. The total aquaculture losses at sea amounted to more than 2.2 trillion VND. Approximately 117,000 hectares (290,000 acres) of forest in Quảng Ninh were damaged. The affected areas were mostly planted forests, including pine, acacia, and eucalyptus. Consequently, from 28 September, nine fires occurred due to dry weather, destroying over 57 hectares (140 acres).

=== Haiphong ===
In Haiphong, the typhoon caused two fatalities, along with one soldier who died while assisting residents in recovery efforts, with economic losses exceeding 13 trillion VND. Of this, the agricultural sector accounted for nearly 4.9 trillion VND, or about 40% of the total damage. On Cát Bà Island, over 4,700 houses and numerous school, healthcare, and government facilities were severely damaged. Communication, electricity, and telecommunications systems on the island were heavily affected and completely paralyzed. Factories, workshops, and industrial zones in Quảng Ninh and Haiphong suffered significant destruction from the typhoon.

=== Lào Cai province ===
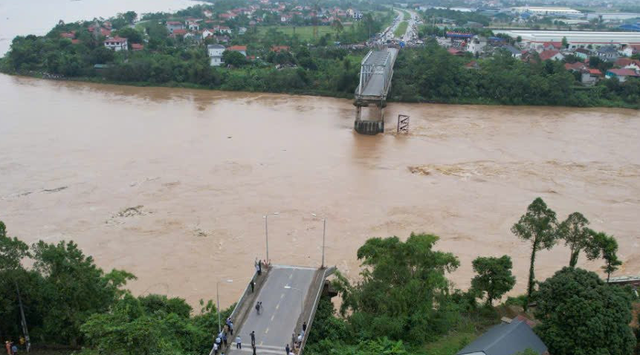
Phong Châu bridge collapse in Phú Thọ

The heaviest casualties were in Lào Cai province, where 138 people were killed and 13 were reported missing, including 75 in Bảo Yên district and 30 in Bắc Hà district. Among these, 60 deaths and 7 missing were caused by a severe flash flood in Làng Nủ village (Phúc Khánh commune, Bảo Yên district) on 10 September. This flood, originating from the Con Voi mountain, swept away 37 houses in Làng Nủ, leaving only two intact. By 10 October, search efforts for missing persons had ceased. Additionally, a landslide in Hoà Sử Pán village, Mường Hoa commune, Sa Pa town, caused six deaths and nine injuries. Economic damages in Lào Cai as of 21 October were estimated at over 7.065 trillion VND. Transportation losses accounted for over 3.2 trillion VND, while agricultural losses exceeded 914 billion VND as of 30 September.

=== Other regions ===
In Cao Bằng, 55 people died, and three were missing as of 29 September, including nine fatalities from a landslide in Lũng Lỳ village, Ca Thành commune, Nguyên Bình district, on 9 September. On the same day, another landslide swept away vehicles, and by 16 September 32 bodies had been recovered. In Yên Bái province, a landslide in Át Thượng village, Minh Xuân commune, Lục Yên district, on the early morning of 10 September destroyed four houses and killed nine people, with the last body found after about 16 days. Across Yên Bái, rain from the typhoon's remnants caused 54 deaths, including 22 in Yên Bái City, with economic damages estimated at 5.738 trillion VND.

In Phú Thọ, the Phong Châu Bridge collapsed around 10 a.m. on 9 September 2024, with 10 vehicles (including a truck, two trailers, six motorcycles, and one electric bike) on the bridge at the time. By 23 September, four bodies had been recovered, four people were still missing, and three were injured. In Tuyên Quang, a dyke on the Lô River burst on the evening of 10 September, submerging many houses in a large area in Quyết Thắng commune, Sơn Dương district. In Hanoi, over 100,000 trees were uprooted and 6,521 buildings were damaged, with four fatalities reported (one during the typhoon, the others due to pre-typhoon storms or post-typhoon incidents). Over 100,000 trees were uprooted or broken, and economic damages in Hanoi reached nearly 2.3 trillion VND.

== Aftermath ==
=== Economic effects ===
Costliest tropical cyclones in Vietnam
Rank	Storm	Season	Damage		Ref.
Rank	Storm	Season	VND	USD	Ref.
1	Yagi	2024	84.5 trillion	$3.47 billion	
2	Bualoi	2025	23.9 trillion	$950 million	
3	Damrey	2017	22.7 trillion	$1 billion	
4	Matmo	2025	21 trillion	$837 million	
5	Doksuri	2017	18.4 trillion	$809 million	
6	Ketsana	2009	16.1 trillion	$896 million	
7	Wutip	2013	13.6 trillion	$648 million	
8	Molave	2020	13.3 trillion	$573 million	
9	TD 23W	2017	13.1 trillion	$579 million	
10	Kalmaegi	2025	13.1 trillion	$521 million	

Yagi and the subsequent flooding caused severe economic consequences for Vietnam, marking the most significant natural disaster in northern Vietnam in many years. According to estimates and statements by the Vietnamese government, as specified in Resolution No. 143, the country's GDP growth rate could decrease by 0.15% compared to the forecast scenario, with growth rates in northern provinces like Quảng Ninh, Thái Nguyên, and Lào Cai potentially declining by over 0.5%. According to a government report submitted to the 8th session of Vietnam's National Assembly, the typhoon led to 323 deaths, 22 missing persons, 1,978 injuries, over 280,000 damaged or unroofed homes, more than 120,000 flooded homes, and nearly 12,000 aquaculture cages destroyed or swept away. By the end of 2024, the Ministry of Agriculture and Rural Development reported that the total economic losses caused by Typhoon Yagi in Vietnam were estimated at over 84.543 trillion VND (US$3.47 billion) in the final report. This amount was comparable to the total annual state budget revenue of the northern midland and mountainous regions. Agricultural losses accounted for an estimated 38.086 trillion VND, or 45% of total economic damages. The economic damages caused by Typhoon Yagi and its subsequent flooding were the most severe ever caused by a natural disaster in Vietnam, four times greater than the average economic losses from natural disasters over the past decade. They also surpassed the total losses of approximately 60 trillion VND recorded in 2017, a year with numerous typhoons making landfall in Vietnam.

Various sectors, especially industry, logistics, tourism, and agriculture, were disrupted. Many businesses and individuals were unable to repay loans on time, affecting debts totaling 100 trillion VND, and the insurance industry faced numerous compensation claims. The typhoon also disrupted the lives and mental well-being of a portion of the population, impacting production and business activities. Over 6.1 million customers experienced power outages, with some areas losing power for over ten days due to damage to the power grid. As of 17 September, more than 100,000 households were still without electricity. The telecommunications infrastructure was also heavily damaged, with 9,235 base transceiver stations losing connectivity, and one network operator losing over 50% of its network during the storm. Transportation routes were severely disrupted and damaged, with over 110 flights canceled. By 14 September, 3,924 sections of roads had been damaged due to landslides, roadbed subsidence, road breaks, and damaged bridges and culverts. Additionally, 253 sections of roads were submerged, and two spans of Phong Châu Bridge collapsed. According to the Ministry of Transport, the damage to transportation infrastructure in northern provinces exceeded 3 trillion VND. The Vietnam Association of Seafood Exporters and Producers (VASEP) stated that the seafood industry in Vietnam was severely impacted by Typhoon Yagi, with businesses suffering facility damages and lost business opportunities. On 10 September, the Ho Chi Minh City Stock Exchange reported that the stock prices of many insurance companies dropped sharply, ranging from 1% to 4.6%, due to the negative impacts of Typhoon Yagi.

=== Government response ===
In Vietnam, on the afternoon of 10 September, the Presidium of the Vietnamese Fatherland Front Committee launched a fundraising campaign to support those affected by Typhoon Yagi, acknowledging the limitations of the state budget. The Vietnamese Fatherland Front Committee and the National Relief Fund pledged to use all donated funds effectively, transparently, and for their intended purposes. As of 5:00 pm on 19 September, the total amount transferred to the National Relief Fund's account had reached 1.495 trillion VND (US$60.77 million), of which 1.035 trillion VND (US$42.17 million) had already been disbursed to affected areas. By mid-November, contributions to the National Relief Fund from agencies, organizations, and individuals to support recovery efforts exceeded 2.185 trillion VND, which was distributed to the localities. Vietnamese Prime Minister Phạm Minh Chính became emotional when publicly speaking about the losses suffered by the people due to Typhoon Yagi, reaffirming his determination to "address the aftermath of this historic disaster." In addition, with nearly 100 factories damaged, the Prime Minister announced a 100 billion VND (approximately US$4.2 million) relief package for Haiphong. However, both Haiphong and Quảng Ninh declined this support, opting to allocate their own resources for recovery and to reserve the relief funds for more disadvantaged areas. Despite being among the most economically impacted regions, these provinces achieved high GRDP growth rates in 2024, with Haiphong reaching 11.01% and Quảng Ninh at 8.42%, outperforming other localities nationwide.

The Vietnamese government introduced various mechanisms and policies to support affected residents and businesses in resuming production and operations. The military was mobilized to assist in recovery efforts, and soldiers who lost their lives in these efforts were posthumously awarded national honors. The Engineering Corps installed a temporary pontoon bridge at Phong Châu to replace the collapsed bridge and facilitate transportation. By the end of 2024, a new Phong Châu Bridge project, valued at 635 billion VND, was launched. In Lào Cai, one of the areas hardest hit by Typhoon Yagi's remnants, each household affected by the Làng Nủ flash flood was provided with 50 to 60 square meters (540 to 650 sq ft) of temporary residential land while awaiting the completion of a resettlement area, funded through social contributions. On 22 December, the resettlement site for Làng Nủ villagers in Lao Cai was inaugurated to mark the 80th anniversary of the founding of People's Army of Vietnam. Additionally, Vietnam and China cooperated on flood control, with Vietnam sending diplomatic notes urging China to regulate water flow from upstream areas of the Red River and provide advance notice. The Chinese government agreed to slow the release of water from upstream dams and store water in reservoirs to mitigate downstream flooding peaks.

Prime Minister Phạm Minh Chính pointed out shortcomings in forecasting, noting that authorities failed to "anticipate the 17 bft gusts upon landfall, their prolonged effects inland, and the extended heavy rainfall across a wide area, with some locations receiving up to 700 mm; as well as inaccuracies in water inflow forecasts for reservoirs and major rivers."

=== International response ===
In response to the severe impacts of Typhoon Yagi, the United States pledged an immediate humanitarian aid package of $1 million for Vietnam. The Australian government allocated 3 million AUD (US$2 million) for emergency relief and essential services. Australia also dispatched emergency relief supplies via C-17 Globemaster aircraft, including essential items such as shelter and hygiene kits for affected families. The Red Cross Society of China donated $100,000 to the Vietnam Red Cross. The Swiss Agency for Development and Cooperation provided US$1.17 million and deployed six experts to assist recovery efforts in Vietnam. Switzerland also sent a relief shipment to Vietnam weighing over 25,000 kg. Indian billionaire businessman Gautam Adani committed a $1 million donation to help Vietnam recover from the devastation caused by Typhoon Yagi. On 14 September, the United Kingdom announced £1 million (US$1.25 million) in humanitarian aid for Vietnam. The Japanese government, through the Japan International Cooperation Agency (JICA), sent emergency relief supplies to assist Vietnam's recovery from the storm's damage, while South Korea committed $2 million in humanitarian aid for Vietnam. The Singapore Red Cross contributed 50,000 SGD (US$36,500) to support the Vietnam Red Cross in providing humanitarian relief to those affected.

On 18 September, the Irish Embassy in Hanoi announced a donation of €250,000 (US$295,675) to UNICEF to provide clean water, sanitation, and hygiene resources for vulnerable children and families affected by the storm. The Canadian Embassy in Hanoi revealed that Canada pledged humanitarian aid worth 560,000 CAD (US$1.12 million) to support Vietnamese people impacted by severe flooding and landslides caused by Typhoon Yagi. The Russian Ministry of Emergency Situations also sent 35 tons of humanitarian aid to Lào Cai Province, the hardest-hit region in Vietnam. The United Nations Office for the Coordination of Humanitarian Affairs (OCHA) announced a $2 million fund to assist Vietnam in its response to Typhoon Yagi. Most donor countries expressed condolences to Vietnam, including Argentina, Belgium, Belarus, Brunei, Bulgaria, Canada, Cuba, the Czech Republic, Germany, Kazakhstan, Laos, Norway, New Zealand, Seychelles, Singapore, Slovenia, Switzerland, Spain, Thailand, the United Kingdom, Uzbekistan, and the Vatican.

=== Media analysis and public reactions ===
Typhoon Yagi was considered the strongest typhoon in the South China Sea in the last 30 years, and the strongest typhoon to make landfall in Vietnam in the last 70 years. According to several Vietnamese news outlets, Typhoon Yagi displayed numerous "anomalies," such as rapid intensification, an unusually long duration as a super typhoon without weakening as expected, and abnormal storm circulation causing heavy rainfall in areas outside the storm's usual influence. VnExpress reported that Typhoon Yagi's rapid intensification and record strength—its strongest in 30 years—was partially attributed to rising sea temperatures in the South China Sea. Typhoon Yagi was considered one of the ten most "outstanding events in the natural resources and environment sector" by the Ministry of Natural Resources and Environment. It was also recognized as one of the most significant events of 2024 in Vietnam by the Vietnam News Agency, VnExpress, the Vietnamese government's official website, and Vietnam Television.

On 10 September, before an international friendly match between the Vietnamese and Thai national football teams, the organizers and the Vietnam Football Federation (VFF) observed a one-minute silence to express solidarity with those affected by Typhoon Yagi and donated 400 million VND. Several matches in the opening round of the 2024–25 National Football Championship also called for donations to support those negatively impacted by the typhoon. The Vietnamese government also held a moment of silence for the storm victims during a session on 14 September.

The effects of Yagi and subsequent severe weather caused mental distress to those in affected areas, especially children, elderly people and other vulnerable groups. Many residents directly affected by the storm expressed fatigue and helplessness at the scene of "ruins, devastation, and chaos" in the aftermath. An article by Thanh Niên stated that more than ten days after Typhoon Yagi made landfall, "many incidents occurred, with losses and grief that might take a very long time—or possibly never—to heal." The article likened the devastation to wartime, describing how hundreds of villagers were instantly submerged by a landslide "after a deafening explosion." Many children could not attend school or had no school left to return to after the typhoon. Numerous individuals, organizations, and charitable programs rallied to provide donations, share sympathy, and support those affected.

A village leader named Ma Seo Chứ in Bắc Hà, Lào Cai, was praised by the media and local authorities for his efforts during the disaster. He evacuated 115 residents to a safe area upon identifying the risk of a landslide. In Hanoi, the uprooting of trees due to the typhoon, with many roots still wrapped in protective covers and planted in shallow, narrow pits with tangled nylon cords, sparked debates about whether improper planting techniques contributed to the uprootings.

=== Controversies over charitable activities ===
Numerous media outlets reported issues related to charitable activities during and after Typhoon Yagi's landfall. Controversies arose on social media over celebrities and individuals allegedly misusing donations, failing to allocate the amounts declared publicly, which sparked extended debates. To ensure transparency in relief funds, the Central Committee of the Vietnamese Fatherland Front published over 12,000 pages of donation records on its official Facebook page on the evening of 12 September. This led to the exposure of multiple fake accounts attempting to manipulate donation amounts.

The media and online communities labeled those who falsified donation records as engaging in phông bạt (lit. 'canvas backdrop'), referring to individuals seeking attention, fabricating charitable contributions, or exploited donation drives for personal gain. Some apologized and expressed remorse, while others avoided responsibility or shifted blame. The government stated that those violating regulations could face fines of 2–3 million VND for "using fraudulent methods to appropriate property."

Following the publication of donation records, new online tools were introduced to facilitate quick searches of contributors' accounts. However, these tools also sparked debates online. According to Dân Trí, many argued that the transparency of donor information remained inadequate, potentially harming individuals' or organizations' reputations through misuse of these data to fabricate or undermine contributions and identities.

Lê Quý Đôn Primary School in Gò Vấp district, Ho Chi Minh City implemented a policy of awarding certificates of appreciation to students who donated 100,000 VND or more to support those affected by the typhoon. Students who donated less than this amount only received a letter of commendation from their homeroom teachers. The school's leadership faced criticism for this practice, with many arguing that it was "inappropriate." Katinat, a chain of beverage stores, posted on their official Facebook page about donating 1,000 VND for each drink sold to support people in northern Vietnam. However, Katinat later issued an apology after receiving mixed feedback. The store also announced it had directly donated a billion VND to the Vietnamese Fatherland Front, instead of basing its donation on the number of drinks sold each day as initially planned.

== Forecasting and assessment inconsistencies ==
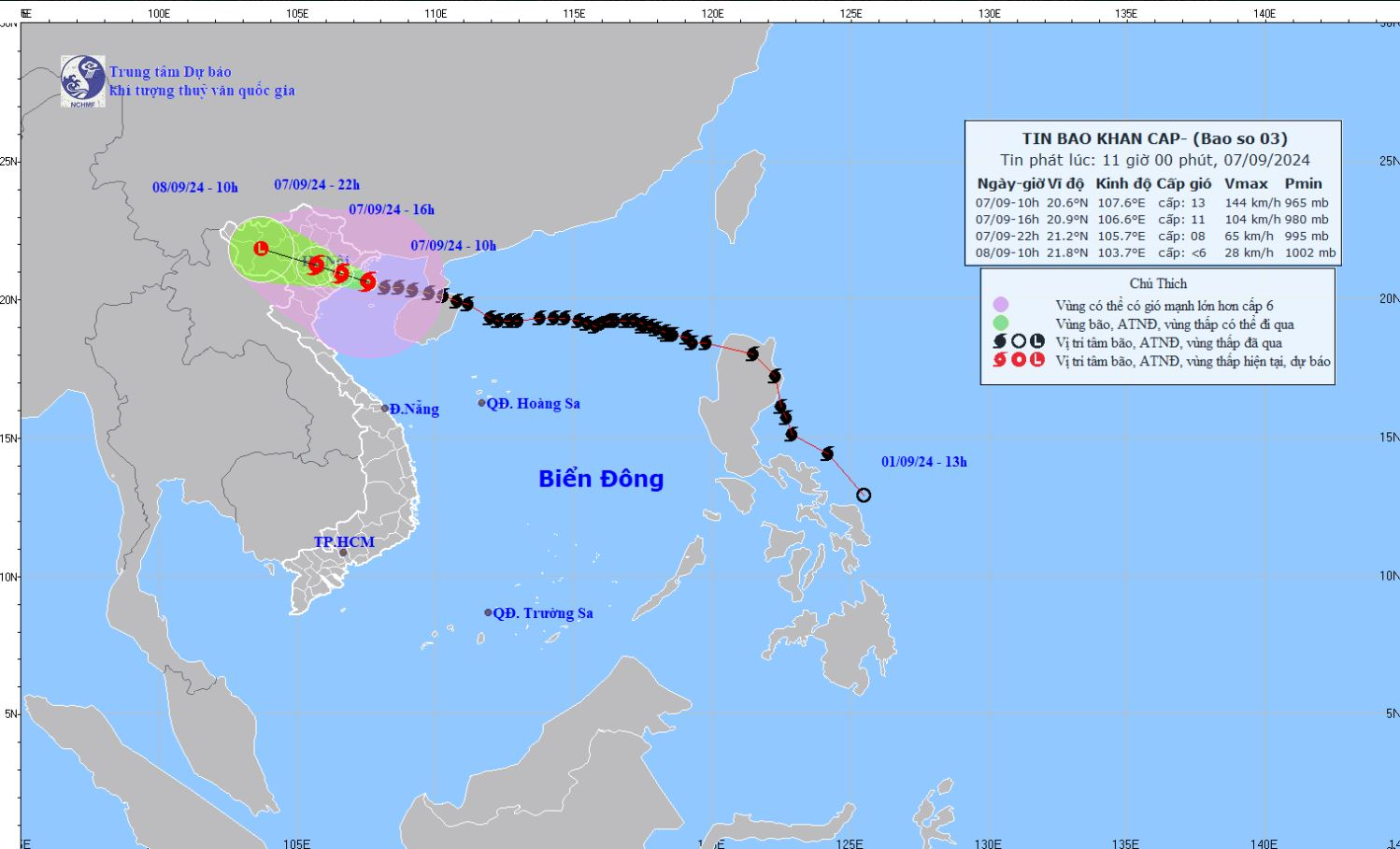
Report made by NCHMF at 11am local time (04:00 UTC) on 7 September, when Yagi was directly impacting the Vietnamese coastline.

Forecasts and assessments of Typhoon Yagi from Vietnam's National Center for Hydro-Meteorological Forecasting (NCHMF) diverged significantly with that of other meteorological agencies. The NCHMF initially forecasted that Yagi would weaken upon entering the Gulf of Tonkin and make landfall in Vietnam with wind speeds of 12–13 bft. However, Hoàng Phúc Lâm, Deputy Director of NCHMF, acknowledged that "the storm may reorganize and regain strength, though significant intensification is unlikely." While Yagi did weaken slightly after passing Hainan, the Joint Typhoon Warning Center (JTWC) projected that the storm could intensify to at least 215 km/h (134 mph) 1-minute sustained winds within the following 6–12 hours over the Gulf of Tonkin before landfall in Vietnam.

As Yagi moved into the Gulf of Tonkin, favorable conditions allowed for structural reorganization and reintensification, with the storm redeveloping an eye feature. At 00:00 UTC on 7 September, the JTWC upgraded Yagi's intensity to 215 km/h (134 mph), categorizing it as a Category 4-equivalent typhoon on the Saffir-Simpson scale, and described its impending landfall in Vietnam as "a historical landfall." The China Meteorological Administration (CMA) also indicated that Yagi was strengthening over the Gulf of Tonkin, assessing its winds at 52 m/s (190 km/h) (2-minute sustained), equivalent to 16 bft, at 05:00 CST (04:00 UTC+7) on 7 September. By 14:00 CST (13:00 UTC+7), as Yagi neared Quảng Ninh province and Haiphong, CMA reported the storm's winds had increased to 60 m/s (220 km/h), equivalent to 17 bft. The agency later confirmed that Yagi made landfall in Quảng Ninh at 15:30 CST with sustained winds of 58 m/s (210 km/h) (17 bft), classifying it as a super typhoon by Chinese standards. The Japan Meteorological Agency (JMA) also assessed that Yagi strengthened over the Gulf of Tonkin, noting in its real-time observations and December 2024 post-storm analysis that the storm had weakened to 85 kn (157 km/h) with a central pressure of 945 hPa (27.9 inHg) upon entering the Gulf. However, by 06:00 UTC (13:00 UTC+7) on 7 September, JMA estimated that Yagi's winds had increased to 90 kn (170 km/h), with a pressure drop to 935 hPa (27.6 inHg). JMA stated that its landfall intensity estimates were based on the Dvorak technique combined with surface meteorological observations. The Hong Kong Observatory also classified Yagi as a super typhoon upon landfall in Vietnam.

Despite these assessments from international agencies, on 7 September, Vietnam officially recorded Yagi's landfall intensity in Quảng Ninh and Hải Phòng as 12–13 bft. However, wind speeds at Bãi Cháy were reported as "14 bft, with gusts reaching 17 bft." In an emergency dispatch on 8 September, the Quảng Ninh Provincial People's Committee acknowledged Yagi's landfall intensity as 13–14 bft, with gusts exceeding 17 bft. However, from 16:00 on 7 September until the storm dissipated into a remnant low, the NCHMF omitted Bãi Cháy's wind readings from its reports. Even in its report on 11 September, the agency only mentioned Yagi's landfall intensity as 12–13 bft, with gusts up to 15 bft, omitting specific wind data for Bãi Cháy. On 15 September, following a government meeting, the NCHMF revised its report to state that Yagi had made landfall at 13–14 bft, with gusts reaching 16–17 bft. The agency reported Bãi Cháy's wind speeds at 45 m/s (14 bft) with gusts of 62 m/s (17 bft) at 13:00 on 7 September. However, 62 m/s (223 km/h) exceeded 17 bft on Vietnam's extended Beaufort scale, where the highest defined level is 61.2 m/s.

In October 2024, a report from Vietnam submitted to the ESCAP/WMO Typhoon Committee for the 19th Integrated Workshop in Shanghai assessed Yagi's landfall intensity at 14–15 bft, with gusts at 17 bft; stronger than previous domestic reports. According to the Typhoon Committee report, the Bãi Cháy station recorded sustained winds of 50 m/s (180 km/h) (15 bft) and gusts of 63 m/s (230 km/h), which exceeded 17 bft, at 13:21 on 7 September 2024. These wind speeds matched or exceeded the strongest sustained winds ever recorded along Vietnam's coastal areas—previously 15 bft, with gusts reaching 17 bft, as defined in Decision No. 2901 by Vietnam's Ministry of Natural Resources and Environment in 2016. However, shortly after, a revised report was submitted to the ESCAP/WMO Typhoon Committee that aligns with domestic reports, revising Yagi's landfall intensity to 13–14 bft, with gusts at 16–17 bft. While acknowledging that 62 m/s was above 17 bft, the agency did not explain the revision.

According to Hoàng Đức Cường, Deputy Director General of the Vietnam Meteorological and Hydrological Administration, Typhoon Yagi produced gusts of 17 bft at Bãi Cháy (in reality exceeding 17 bft), making it the first time such extreme winds were recorded on land in Vietnam. The Vietnam Meteorological and Hydrological Administration confirmed that discussions took place between Vietnamese meteorologists and international agencies, including Japanese and Chinese meteorologists. According to the Natural Resources and Environment magazine, five discussions between Vietnamese and international meteorologists were recorded—two with Chinese meteorologists when Yagi neared Hainan and three with Japanese meteorologists when it approached the South China Sea. There were no documented exchanges during Yagi's passage over the Gulf of Tonkin.

Following the storm, VnExpress reported that actual wind speeds in Hanoi exceeded forecasts by three levels, reaching 10 bft with gusts up to 12 bft, whereas initial predictions had estimated only 6–7 bft with gusts at 10 bft.

At the NCHMF's annual review meeting on 18 December 2024, the agency reported that Yagi made landfall in Quảng Ninh province and Haiphong with winds of 10–12 bft, gusting to 13–15 bft, lower than all previous reports. In the meeting, the Bãi Cháy station is considered to have measured 14 bft winds, but at an altitude of 34 meters (112 ft). This information was reiterated in the agency's climate summary for 2024, released in early 2025.

== See also ==
- Tropical cyclones in Vietnam
