= Tropical cyclones in Vietnam =

Typhoon Yagi making landfall in northern Vietnam in September 2024

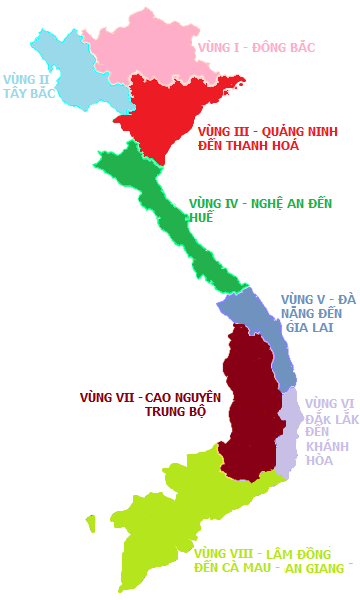
Tropical cyclone zoning in Vietnam according to Decision 2901 of 2016 of the Ministry of Natural Resources and Environment of Vietnam

Vietnam is a southeast Asian country, and is the easternmost country of mainland Southeast Asia. Because it is located in the easternmost part and borders the South China Sea, it is often affected by tropical cyclones. Tropical cyclones in this area are considered to be part of the Northwest Pacific basin. There are about 11 to 13 tropical cyclones entering the South China Sea during the period from June to November every year.

Every year, there are about 4 to 6 tropical cyclones that make landfall or directly affect the mainland. According to the climate law, the tropical cyclones season in Vietnam gradually slows down from North to South, with the highest storm frequency in the coastal provinces from Quảng Ninh to Thanh Hoá and the lowest in the area from Lâm Đồng to Cà Mau and An Giang. Tropical cyclone have a strong impact and cause damage to both the economy and life of this country.

Any tropical cyclone entering the South China Sea west of 120°E and north of 5°N are monitored and reported by the National Center for Hydro-Meteorological Forecasting (NCHMF) together with the Japan Meteorological Agency (JMA) and the Joint Typhoon Warning Center (JTWC). NCHMF also regularly issues weather bulletins and advisories to the public, especially during storms. The Vietnamese government also pays attention to storm and tropical depression prevention and control, and natural disasters in general. The country has established the National Civil Defense Steering Committee (formerly the National Steering Committee for Natural Disaster Prevention and Control; National Committee for Incident, Disaster Response and Search and Rescue) to develop and implement plans to respond to storms, tropical depressions and other types of natural disasters. A five-level disaster risk warning scale, issued under Decision No. 18/QD-TTg in 2021 of the Prime Minister of Vietnam, will apply to all or part of the provinces and localities affected by tropical cyclones when they are forecast to have the potential to affect mainland Vietnam.

== General overview ==
=== Etymology and Definition ===
Bão comes from the word "暴". (Hán-Việt: bạo). According to Hoang Phê (2003), "Bão" means "a large-scale whirlwind in an area with very low air pressure, often originating from the open sea, with violent destruction due to strong winds and heavy rain"

Nguyễn Đức Ngữ (1998) defines cyclones as atmospheric disturbances with pressure decreasing from the edges to the center, and in the Northern Hemisphere the wind blows counterclockwise.

The National Center for Hydro-Meteorological Forecasting (NCHMF) defines storms and tropical depressions, collectively known as tropical cyclones, as "a whirlwind, up to hundreds of kilometers in diameter, forming over tropical seas; in the Northern Hemisphere, winds blow into the center in a counterclockwise direction; the atmospheric pressure in the storm is much lower than the surrounding area and is usually lower than 1000mbar". Depending on location and intensity, tropical cyclones are known by different names. In the Northwest Pacific basin, including Vietnam, meteorologists use the term typhoon (in English) to refer to tropical storms with minimum wind speeds of 118 km/h (73 mph), according to the regulations of the Japan Meteorological Agency (JMA), the unit established the Regional Specialized Meteorological Center (RSMC Tokyo) of the Northwest Pacific as assigned by the World Meteorological Organization (WMO).

=== Meteorology ===
Vietnam's Tropical Cyclone Intensity Scale
Category	Sustained winds	Beaufort number
Tropical Depression	≤33 knots ≤61 km/h	6-7
Tropical Storm	34–47 knots 62–88 km/h	8-9
Severe Tropical Storm	48–63 knots 89–117 km/h	10-11
Typhoon	64–99 knots 118–183 km/h	12-15
Super Typhoon	≥100 knots ≥184 km/h	≥16

In Vietnam, as in the Northwest Pacific basin, tropical cyclone are generally active year-round from January to December. However, the tropical cyclone season in Vietnam is usually considered to be from June to November. On average, the South China Sea records 11 to 13 tropical cyclone in many years and the tropical cyclone season in the South China Sea is assessed to slow down from North to South. The strongest activity is in July, August, September, and October with an average of about 2 tropical cyclones per month. However, there are some years when the South China Sea has many storms. In 2017, a record 20 tropical cyclones (including 16 typhoons/storms and 4 tropical depressions) were recorded. Conversely, there are also years with few storms, in which the year with the fewest storms in the South China Sea was 1969 with a total of 5 tropical cyclones. A study was investigated in the correlation of rainfall and tropical cyclones during El Niño and La Niña seasons, and showed that there is an increase of rainfall and tropical cyclones during La Niña seasons.

Vietnam currently uses the Beaufort wind scale to measure storm intensity. Before 2006, the wind scale in Vietnam only used up to level 12 and above. After typhoon Chanchu and Xangsane in 2006, the Vietnamese Government issued Decision 245/2006/QD-TTg, stipulating the expansion of the wind scale in Vietnam to level 17 (maximum 220 km/h). Currently in Vietnam, according to Decision 18/2021/QD-TTg on forecasting, warning, transmitting information on natural disasters and disaster risk levels issued by the Prime Minister, the tropical cyclone scale in Vietnam includes 5 types: tropical depression, tropical storm, severe tropical storm, typhoon and super typhoon. The wind scale in Vietnam according to this regulation also stops at level 17.

=== Storm zoning ===
Storm zoning table in Vietnam
Region	Area
I	Northeast (5 provinces)
II	Northwest (3 provinces)
III	Northern Delta, Midlands and Thanh Hoá (8 provinces)
IV	Nghệ An to Huế (4 provinces)
V	Đà Nẵng to Gia Lai (3 provinces)
VI	Đắk Lắk to Khánh Hoà (2 provinces)
VII	West of Quang Ngai, Gia Lai, Dak Lak and Lam Dong provinces
VIII	Lâm Đồng to Cà Mau—An; Giang and Southern (9 provinces)

After Super Typhoon Haiyan in 2013, the Vietnamese Government began developing scenarios to respond to typhoons and super typhoons. Decision No. 1857/QD-BTNMT dated August 29, 2014 of the Ministry of Natural Resources and Environment divided the storm zone in Vietnam into 5 regions: from Quảng Ninh to Thanh Hoá, Nghệ An to Thừa Thiên-Huế, Đà Nẵng to Bình Định, Phú Yên to Khánh Hoà and Ninh Thuận to Cà Mau. By 2016, the Ministry of Natural Resources and Environment continued to divide Vietnam into 8 regions. These 8 regions include: the Northeast region; the Northwest region; the Northern plains, midlands and coastal areas from Quang Ninh to Thanh Hoa; from Nghệ An to Huế; from Đà Nẵng to Bình Định (from July 1, 2025, Gia Lai province); from Phú Yên to Ninh Thuận (from July 1, 2025, Dak Lak province and Khánh Hoà province); the Central Highlands and the South (including Bình Thuận province, from July 1, 2025, Lâm Đồng province)

However, according to the decentralization of hydrometeorological management in Vietnam from 2025, 3 hydrometeorological stations are arranged in 3 regions: Northern Hydrometeorological Station; Central Hydrometeorological Station; Southern Hydrometeorological Station. Previously, according to Decision 03/2018/QD-TTg, the Northern region of Vietnam was divided into 4 hydrometeorological stations including Northwest, Northeast, Viet Bac and Northern Delta. By 2023, Vietnam will have 7 meteorological stations including the Northern Mountains, Northern Midlands and Delta, North Central, Central Central, South Central, Central Highlands and South. In weather forecasting and warning, Vietnam is divided into 6 regions including Northwest, Northeast, Thanh Hoa to Hue, Da Nang to Lam Dong, Central Highlands and South. In addition, there are many different studies for different ways of distributing storm landing zones in Vietnam.

== Landfall ==
=== Frequency, trajectory and intensity ===
On average, Vietnam is affected by 6–8 tropical cyclones annually. including between 4-6 tropical cyclones that made landfall in the country. According to research by Nguyễn Văn Thắng and colleagues, September was the month with the highest number of tropical cyclone making landfall in Vietnam during the period 1961–2014. However, there have been years when no tropical cyclone made landfall in Vietnam, such as 1976, 2002, and 2023. The longest period without a tropical cyclone making landfall on the Vietnamese coast was from October 16, 2022, to July 22, 2024 (646 days). According to one study, the year with the most tropical cyclone hitting Vietnam was 1973, with 12 tropical cyclones. Meanwhile, another study estimated that in 1978 there were as many as 13 tropical cyclones affecting mainland Vietnam. Some studies also indicate that in years when La Niña occurs, the average number of tropical cyclone affecting Vietnam reaches 8.3 per year, significantly more than in years with El Niño, which average 5.3 per year. Furthermore, under La Niña conditions, the frequency of tropical cyclone affecting Central Vietnam also increases. For example, the successive tropical cyclones that hit central Vietnam in 2020 caused catastrophic floods in this region. According to documents from Vietnam's Ministry of Natural Resources and Environment, the highest average frequency of tropical cyclone landfall is in the northern delta and midland regions and the coastal areas from Quảng Ninh to Thanh Hoá, with 2.0 to 2.5 tropical cyclones per year. According to Nguyễn Xuân Chính and Nguyễn Đại Minh, the northern coastal region has the highest density of tropical cyclone (calculated per 100 km of coastline) in the country, accounting for 43% of all strong typhoons. In addition, storms that hit northern Vietnam are also considered to generate stronger winds than storms that hit southern provinces.

Furthermore, documents from the Vietnamese Ministry of Natural Resources and Environment also indicate that the coastal area of Northern Vietnam once recorded the highest wind speed in Vietnam at level 15 with gusts up to level 17, corresponding to the wind speed recorded during Typhoon Wendy in 1968, which was 50 m/s (180 km/h) with gusts of 57 m/s (210 km/h) at the Phù Liễn meteorological station, exceeding the capabilities of the measuring instrument. When Typhoon Sarah made landfall in Hải Phòng on July 21, 1977, the strongest wind gusts recorded at Phù Liễn were 51 m/s (180 km/h) In 1998, Nguyễn Đức Nghĩa stated that the lowest atmospheric pressure recorded for a typhoon making landfall in Vietnam belonged to Typhoon Cecil in 1985, with 959.9 hPa (28.35 inHg) measured at Đông Hà, Quảng Trị. In 2024, a report from the Vietnamese meteorological agency stated that Super Typhoon Yagi recorded sustained wind speeds of 50 m/s (180 km/h) gusts 63 m/s (230 km/h) (equivalent to level 15 with gusts exceeding level 17) at Bãi Cháy, Quảng Ninh, although some domestic public reports indicate sustained wind speeds at Bãi Cháy are 45 m/s (160 km/h) gusts 62 m/s (220 km/h). Furthermore, the atmospheric pressure at this station during Super Typhoon Yagi was recorded at 955.2 hPa (28.21 inHg), which is also the lowest atmospheric pressure recorded for a typhoon making landfall in Vietnam since complete data became available. The Vietnamese government also assessed Super Typhoon Yagi as the strongest super typhoon in the South China Sea in the past 30 years and the strongest typhoon to hit Vietnam in the past 70 years. Storm wind speeds exceeding 40 m/s (140 km/h) have been repeatedly recorded in the Red River Delta and coastal areas of Quảng Ninh.

Lowest sea level pressure recorded over land for tropical cyclones hitting Vietnam since 1975
Rank	Name	Year	Pressure		Source
Rank	Name	Year	Value	In	Source
1	Yagi (Super Typhoon No.3)	2024	955,2 hPa	Bãi Cháy (Quảng Ninh)	
2	Cecil (Typhoon No.8)	1985	959,9 hPa	Đông Hà (Quảng Trị)	
3	Xangsane (Typhoon No.6)	2006	963,3 hPa	Đà Nẵng	
4	Sarah (Typhoon No.2)	1977	963,4 hPa	Phù Liễn (Hải Phòng)	
5	Doksuri (Typhoon No.10)	2017	966,6 hPa	Ba Đồn (Quảng Trị)	
6	Kalmaegi (Typhoon No.13)	2025	967 hPa	Quy Nhơn (Gia Lai)	
7	Wayne (Typhoon No.5)	1986	967,4 hPa	Nam Định (Ninh Bình)	
8	Vera (Typhoon No.3)	1983	968,3 hPa	Cửa Ông (Quảng Ninh)	
9	Frankie (Typhoon No.2)	1996	969 hPa	Văn Lý (Ninh Bình)	
10	Wutip (Typhoon No.10)	2013	969,2 hPa	Đồng Hới (Quảng Trị)	

=== 1800s ===
- October 5, 1881 - A typhoon struck what is now northern Vietnam, producing a storm surge that flooded the city of Hai Phong, killing around 3,000 people.

=== 1980s ===
- September 1980 - Tropical Storm Ruth struck Thanh Hóa province, causing torrential flooding which killed 164 people. 97 people suffered injuries.

=== 1990s ===
- November 2, 1997 - Tropical Storm Linda struck southern Vietnam, where it wrecked thousands of fishing boats and killed at least 3,111 people.

=== 2000s ===
- August 20, 2000 – Tropical Storm Kaemi makes landfall in Vietnam, killing 17 people, injuring 4, and causing US$7.14 million of damage in the nation.
- August 7, 2008 — Tropical Storm Kammuri (Bão số 4) moved over the extreme northern provinces of Vietnam, killing 127 people in total, with 34 people missing due to flooding and landslides.
- September 24, 2008 — Typhoon Hagupit (Bão số 6) brought heavy flooding which killed 41 people in total and left damages of about
- September 29, 2008 — Tropical Storm Mekkhala (Bão số 7) caused flooding, especially which caused about 3,050 hectares of crops bring damaged in the Thanh Hóa Province.
- October 15, 2008 — Tropical Depression 22W affected Central Vietnam which little to no reported damages.
- November 17, 2008 — Tropical Storm Noul moved over the central provinces which brought agricultural damages.
- July 12, 2009 — Tropical Depression Soudelor (Bão số 4) brought heavy rainfall over the northern provinces, with precipitation totals peaking at 250 mm (9.8 in) in the region. A tornado was also seen from the storm.
- September 3, 2009 — a tropical depression and its outer rainbands led to heavy rainfall throughout central Vietnam, peaking at 430 mm (17 in). Widespread flooding caused economic and agricultural losses of 45 billion (VND; US$2.52 million).
- September 11, 2009 — Tropical Depression Mujigae (Bão số 7) passes through Northern Vietnam.
- September 29, 2009 — Typhoon Ketsana (Bão số 9) brought flash flooding over much of Vietnam. The typhoon killed 179 people, with damages of 16.07 trillion VND (US$896.1 million).
- October 13, 2009 — Tropical Storm Parma (Bão số 10) made landfall over Hai Phong. 62 fishing boats sank due to rough waves.
- November 2, 2009 — Typhoon Mirinae (Bão số 11) brought torrential rainfall which triggered flooding and landslides, killing 124 people. Roughly 2,400 homes were destroyed by swift currents and 437,300 hectares of crops were flooded. Damage was counted as 5.8 trillion đồng (US$323 million).

=== 2010s ===
- January 20, 2010 — Tropical Depression 01W made landfall over Gò Công. Only as a weak system, rough waves caused three people to die.
- July 17, 2010 — Tropical Storm Conson (Bão số 1) brought heavy rainfall over the northern half of Vietnam, with 127 mm (5.0 in) of rain falling in Nam Định.
- August 24, 2010 — Tropical Storm Mindulle (Bão số 3) brought widespread flooding, with at least 10 people bring killed and losses reaching ₫850 billion (US$43.3 million).
- November 14, 2010 — Tropical Depression 18W made landfall near Da Nang.
- June 25, 2011 – Tropical Storm Haima (Bão số 2) moved over Hanoi as a weakening system.
- July 30, 2011 — Tropical Storm Nock-ten (Bão số 3) affected north-central Vietnam with 6,200 acres of rice and other crop fields were reported to be completely submerged due to flooding. 20 people have died from the storm.
- September 26, 2011 — Tropical Storm Haitang (Bão số 4) affected the central provinces of Vietnam, killing 25 people.
- September 30, 2011 — Tropical Storm Nesat (Bão số 5) hit the northern provinces of Vietnam, causing 4,000 people to evacuate in the Nam Định province.

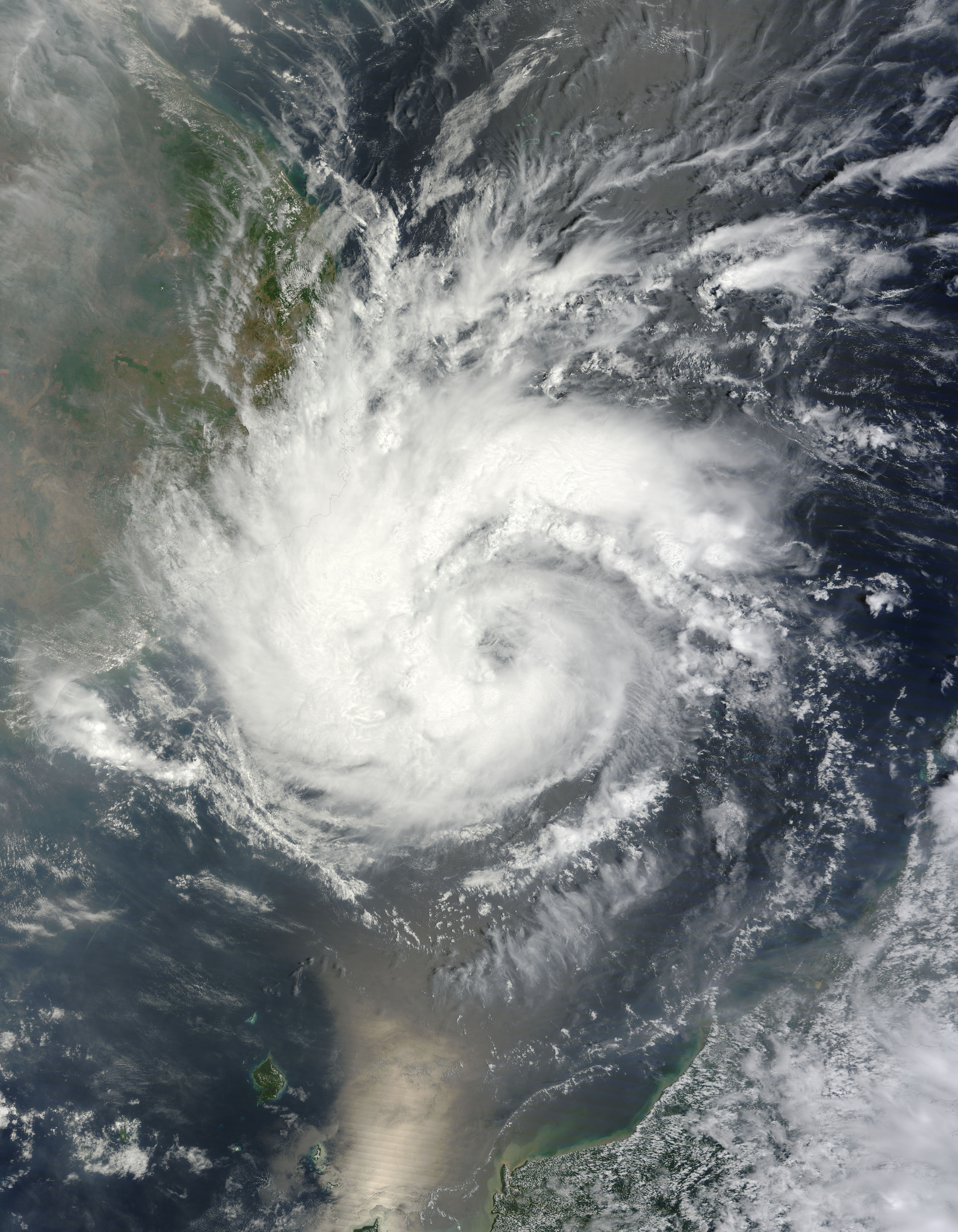
Tropical Storm Pakhar approaching southern Vietnam in April 2012, the only known recorded storm that affected the country in the month of April

- April 1, 2012 — Tropical Storm Pakhar (Bão số 1) affected the southern provinces of Vietnam, making landfall near Vũng Tàu. The storm destroyed about 4,400 homes in the district.
- August 17, 2012 — Tropical Storm Kai-tak (Bão số 5) moved over the northern provinces of Vietnam as a strong tropical storm.
- October 6, 2012 — Tropical Storm Gaemi (Bão số 7) made landfall over Tuy Hòa bringing heavy rainfall.
- October 28, 2012 — Typhoon Son-Tinh (Bão số 8) brushed the northeastern coast of Vietnam as a Category 3-equivalent typhoon before making landfall over northern Vietnam. The typhoon brought gusty winds.
- November 14, 2012 — Tropical Depression 25W moved over Southern Vietnam with minor impacts.
- June 23, 2013 — Tropical Storm Bebinca (Bão số 2) made landfall to the east of Hanoi. Around 4,600 hectares (11,000 acres) of marine ponds were destroyed by the storm.
- August 3, 2013 — Tropical Storm Jebi (Bão số 5) affected the Quang Ninh province, killing 6 people.
- August 7, 2013 — Tropical Storm Mangkhut (Bão số 6) brought heavy rainfall over the northern provinces of Vietnam, with rainfall reaching up to 300 mm (12 in) in central Thanh Hóa province.
- September 18, 2013 — Tropical Depression 18W (Bão số 8) brought widespread rainfall and flooding across much of the country. Total damage in Vietnam reached 817.91 billion dong (US$35.6 million), and a total of 28 people being killed. The province of Hà Tĩnh also experienced a tornado.
- September 30, 2013 — Typhoon Wutip (Bão số 10) made landfall over the Quảng Bình Province as a weakening Category 2-equivalent typhoon. Overall 13 people were killed, and total damage was estimated at ₫13.6 trillion (US$644 million).
- October 14, 2013 — Typhoon Nari (Bão số 11) hit the central provinces of Vietnam as a strong Category 1-equivalent typhoon.
- November 6, 2013 — Tropical Depression 30W (Bão số 13) brought minor impacts over the south-central areas of the country.
- November 10, 2013 — Typhoon Haiyan (Bão số 14) brought widespread rainfall and gusty winds over Northern Vietnam. The typhoon killed 18 people, and left two missing with 93 others being injured. Economic losses in Vietnam were amounted to ₫669 billion (US$31.67 million).
- November 14, 2013 — Tropical Storm Podul (Bão số 15) brought heavy rainfall. Rainfall of 973 mm (38.3 in) were recorded in two districts in the Quảng Ngãi Province, in which some say it was the worst flooding ever seen since 1999. Throughout Vietnam, Podul killed 44 people and injured 74 others.
- July 19, 2014 — Typhoon Rammasun (Bão số 2) only affected the extreme northern provinces of Vietnam, despite not making landfall. Some provinces were put on high alert for flash floods and landslides. 31 people died from the storm due to flooding and landslides.
- September 17, 2014 — Typhoon Kalmaegi (Bão số 3) brought heavy rainfall and gusty winds over the northern portion of the country.
- November 29, 2014 — Tropical Storm Sinlaku (Bão số 4) only affected Central Vietnam.
- June 24, 2015 — Tropical Storm Kujira (Bão số 1) impacted northern Vietnam. 219.9 millimetres (8.66 in) of rain was recorded for a two-day period.
- September 14, 2015 — Tropical Storm Vamco made landfall in the Quảng Nam Province, killing 11 people due to heavy rainfall.
- July 27, 2016 — Tropical Storm Mirinae (Bão số 1) made landfall over Northern Vietnam in Thái Bình. The storm brought rainfall with precipitation exceeding 287 mm (11.3 in) in the Tam Đảo District. Only 7 people died with damages of up to ₫7.229 trillion ($323.9 million).
- August 19, 2016 — Tropical Storm Dianmu (Bão số 3) affected the northern provinces of Vietnam, killing 17 people.
- September 12, 2016 — Tropical Storm Rai (Bão số 4) made landfall in the Quảng Nam Province, where heavy rain caused flooding and the bursting of the Bung River 2 hydroelectricity plant. Only 14 people died from the storm.
- October 13, 2016 — Tropical Storm Aere made landfall over Huế. Precipitation reached at 747 mm (29.4 in) in Đồng Hới, the record since 1955. 37 people died from the storm.
- November 5, 2016 — A tropical depression caused heavy rainfall and flooding over the central and southern provinces of the nation. It is said that it has seen the worst flooding in 5 years at that time.
- December 12, 2016 — Another tropical depression brought heavy rainfall and flooding in the same area as the previous depression. 31 people perished from the system with damages of about ₫1.21 trillion (US$53.4 million).
- July 17, 2017 — Tropical Storm Talas (Bão số 2) made landfall over Nghệ An Province. The storm left 14 people dead and damaged around 2,700 houses.
- July 25, 2017 — Tropical Storm Sonca (Bão số 4) moved over Central Vietnam, leaving six people died.
- September 15, 2017 — Typhoon Doksuri (Bão số 10) impacted Vietnam and was considered as the "most powerful storm in a decade". Total damages from the typhoon reached ₫18.4 trillion (US$809 million).
- September 25, 2017 — Tropical Depression 22W made landfall over Quảng Ninh. The NCHMF forecast rainfall of about 150 millimetres (5.9 in) in Hanoi and surrounding provinces, with rough waves up to 3 m (9.8 ft) in Hạ Long Bay.
- October 10, 2017 — Tropical Depression 23W made landfall over Hà Tĩnh Province. Despite its weak intensity, the system brought extensive damages and several landslides. In total, 100 people were killed and damages reached over 13 trillion ₫ (US$572 million).

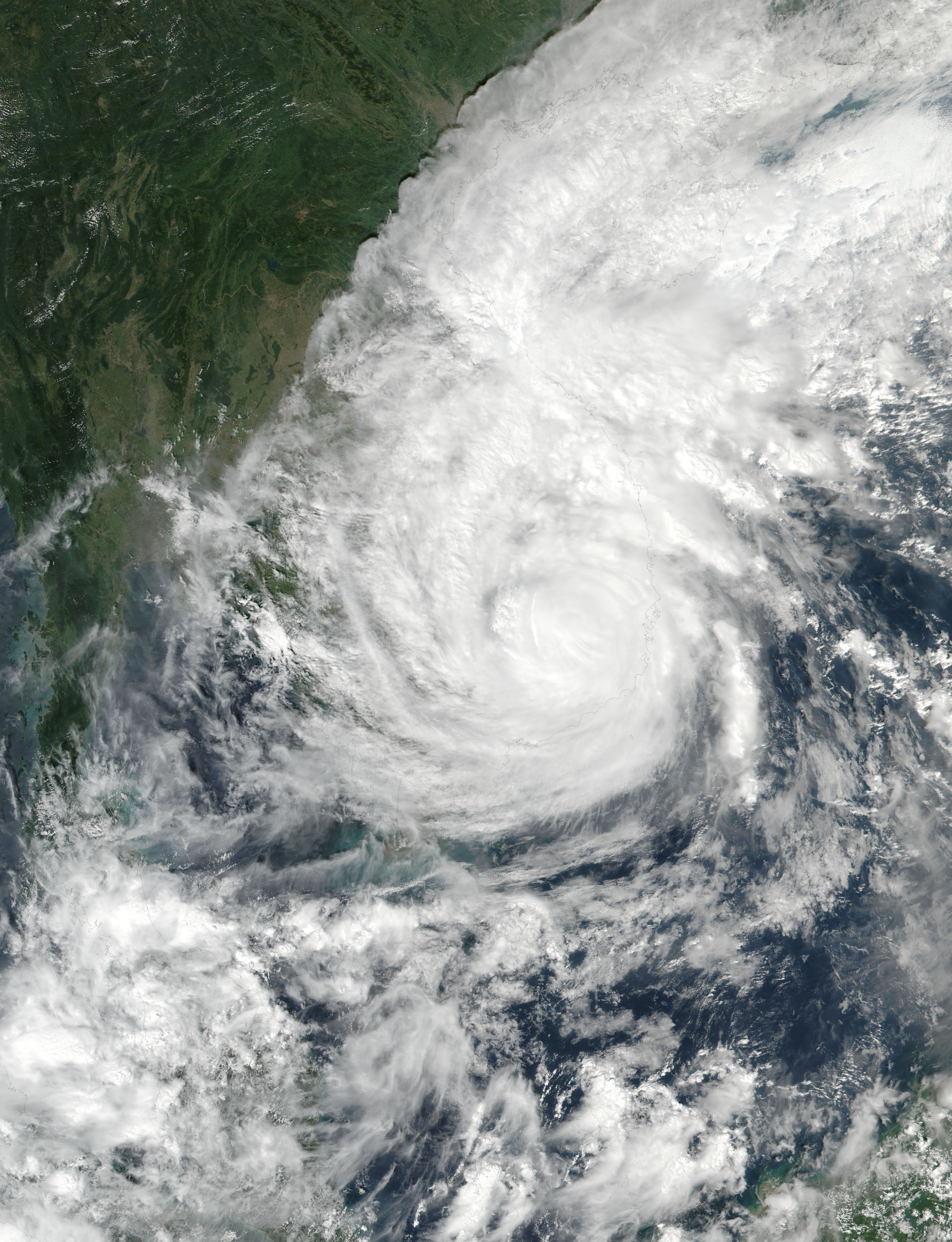
Typhoon Damrey over Vietnam on November 4, 2017

- November 3, 2017 — Typhoon Damrey (Bão số 12) made landfall over Central Vietnam and affected the 2017 APEC Summit in Da Nang. 107 people died from the typhoon and caused damages of up to 22 trillion VND (US$1 billion).
- November 18, 2017 — Tropical Storm Kirogi (Bão số 14) affected the central provinces of the country as a weakening system, causing only US$10 million worth of damages.
- December 25, 2017 — Tropical Storm Tembin (Bão số 16) affected the southernmost parts of the country, bringing only moderate rainfall.
- July 19, 2018 — Tropical Storm Son-Tinh (Bão số 3) caused extensive rainfall over Northern Vietnam. 35 people were killed, more than 5,000 houses, 82,000 hectares (200,000 acres) of crops, and 17,000 farm animals were either swept away, submerged, or otherwise destroyed.
- August 17, 2018 — Tropical Storm Bebinca (Bão số 4) brought strong winds and heavy rainfall which resulted in several mudslides over the northern portion of the country. 10 people were killed by the storm.
- November 17, 2018 — Tropical Storm Toraji (Bão số 8) brought heavy flooding throughout the southern portion of the country. A report a few months after the storm stated that a total of 20 people have died, with total damages measured at ₫1.24 billion (US$53.9 million).
- November 25, 2018 — Tropical Storm Usagi (Bão số 9) caused heavy flooding over Southern Vietnam. Tân Bình District recorded 407.6 millimetres (16.05 in) of rain, surpassing the district's record of most rainfall. Losses were estimated at ₫925 billion (US$39.8 million).
- July 3, 2019 — Tropical Storm Mun (Bão số 2) only affected the extreme northern portion of the country. A bridge in Tĩnh Gia District was damaged by the storm, which killed 2 people and left 3 injured. Damages of the storm were 98 billion VND ($4.25 million).
- August 3, 2019 — Tropical Storm Wipha (Bão số 3) also affected the northern portion of the country. 15 people were killed by the storm, with 1.18 trillion VND ($48 million) in damages.
- August 29, 2019 — Tropical Storm Podul (Bão số 4) brought rainfall which killed 4 and caused damages worth 393 billion VND ($12.3 million).
- September 2, 2019 — Tropical Storm Kajiki brought heavy rainfall and flash flooding. 10 people died from the storm and total losses worth 1.76 trillion VND ($76.2 million).
- October 31, 2019 — Tropical Storm Matmo (Bão số 5) destroyed 2,700 houses and 35 schools, causing 912 billion VND (US$39.8 million) in damage in Vietnam, with majority of losses in two provinces: Quảng Ngãi and Bình Định. The storm also killed two people in the country.
- November 10, 2019 — Tropical Storm Nakri (Bão số 6) made landfall over central Vietnam as a weakening storm, killing 2 and causing 318 billion VND ($13.9 million) in damage.

=== 2020s ===
- August 2, 2020 — Tropical Storm Sinlaku moved over the northern provinces of the nation. Two people died from the storm, with total damages estimating about 300 billion đồng (US$12.94 million).
- September 18, 2020 — Tropical Storm Noul made landfall between the provinces of Quảng Trị and Thừa Thiên-Huế. Heavy precipitation amounts peaking at 310 mm (12 in) fell in Da Nang. The storm caused 6 deaths and 705 billion đồng (US$30.4 million) in damage.
- June 12, 2021 — Tropical Storm Koguma brought heavy downpour over the northern provinces of Vietnam. About ₫2.4 billion (US$104,000).
- September 12, 2021 — Tropical Storm Conson brought rainfall and flooding over central Vietnam. Estimated damages were around ₫100 billion (US$4.3 million), while two people have died.
- September 23, 2021 — Tropical Storm Dianmu made landfall over Thua Thien Hue province. Two people drowned in Tuy Phuoc district, Binh Dinh.
- October 26, 2021 — Tropical Depression 26W brought heavy rainfall, especially in Thua Thien - Hue to Khanh Hoa, which were the provinces that seen to receive heavy rainfall.
- March 30, 2022 – Tropical Depression 01W struck Da Nang as a Tropical Storm in Late March causing floods resulting in the deaths of six.
- September 28, 2022 — Typhoon Noru makes landfall in the city of Da Nang with strong gusts and heavy rain. Power outage happened in both Thua Thien - Hue and Da Nang. Flooding occurred in Quảng Nam which border next to Da Nang.
- October 15, 2022 — Tropical Storm Sonca made landfall in Quảng Ngãi province. Da Nang suffered huge impacts, and the damage in the city reached VND1.486 trillion. (US$61.6 million).
- July 23, 2024 — Severe Tropical Storm Prapiroon made landfall over Quảng Ninh province, becoming the first tropical cyclone to strike Vietnam in 640 days. Minimal damages were estimated at 30 billion dong (US$1.27 million).
- September 7, 2024 — Typhoon Yagi made landfall in Northern Vietnam as one of the strongest in Vietnamese history. As of September 29, 2024, Yagi has caused severe flooding and damage across Vietnam and has caused at least 322 deaths in the country and VND 84.5 trillion (US$3.47 billion) in damages.
- September 17, 2024 — Tropical Storm Soulik made landfall over Vĩnh Linh District in Quảng Trị as a weakening tropical storm, bringing heavy rainfall in the province.
- August 25, 2025 — Typhoon Kajiki made landfall between Nghệ An District and Hà Tĩnh District as a category 2 typhoon where is caused 1 fatality and damage in Nghệ An province exceeded VND 1.48 trillion (US$63.69 million).Damage in Hà Tĩnh province reached VND 2.9 trillion (US$125.22 million) and 35,000 VND billion (US$15.46 million) in Quảng Trị province.
- September 29, 2025 — Typhoon Bualoi made landfall over Hà Tĩnh as a brief category 2 typhoon before dissipating the next day. The storm caused at least 57 to be killed and VND 18.8 trillion (US$748 million) in damages.
- November 6, 2025 — Typhoon Kalmaegi made landfall in Bình Định province as one of the most intense storm to impact central Vietnam for decades & damage is thought to be significant.

== Climatology ==
Storms affecting Vietnam by month
Month	Number of Storms
January	1
February	0
March	1
April	1
May	0
June	4
July	9
August	10
September	19
October	12
November	17
December	2

== Deadliest storms ==
The following list are the ten deadliest storms that impacted Vietnam. Total number of deaths recorded are only from the country itself.

Rank	Name	Year	Number of Deaths
1	Joan	1964	7,000
2	Linda	1997	3,111
3	"Haiphong"	1881	3,000
4	Cecil	1985	769
5	Cecil	1989	751
6	Kate	1955	≥669
7	Wayne	1986	≥408
8	Yagi	2024	325
9	Lex	1983	252
10	Chanchu	2006	241

== See also ==
- Typhoon
- 2026 Pacific typhoon season
