= Hàm Yên =

- Commune
- Interactive map of Hàm Yên
- Coordinates: 22°4′38″N 104°58′57″E
- Country: Vietnam
- Region: Northeast
- Province: Tuyên Quang
- Established: 16 June 2025
- Administrative headquarters: Bắc Mục Hamlet

Area
  - Total: 126.19 km^{2} (48.72 sq mi)

Population (2025)
  - Total: 29,508
  - Density: 233/km^{2} (600/sq mi)

Hàm Yên is a commune in Tuyên Quang province, Vietnam. The commune inherited its name from the former Hàm Yên district.

== History ==
On 16 June 2025, the National Assembly of Vietnam adopted Resolution No. 203/2025/QH15 amending and supplementing several articles of the Constitution of the Socialist Republic of Vietnam. Under the resolution, district-level administrative units nationwide ceased to operate from 1 July 2025.

On the same date, the Standing Committee of the National Assembly of Vietnam issued Resolution No. 1684/NQ-UBTVQH15 on the arrangement of commune-level administrative units in Tuyên Quang province in 2025. Under the resolution, the entire area and population of Tân Yên Township and Tân Thành, Bằng Cốc, and Nhân Mục communes were merged to form a new commune named Hàm Yên.
