= Quảng Hà =

- Interactive map of Quảng Hà
- Coordinates: 21.451313458584647°N 107.75894427193684°E
- Country: Vietnam
- City: Quảng Ninh
- Region: Red River Delta
- Established: 16 June 2025
- Seat: 317 Lý Thường Kiệt

Area
  - Total: 134.37 km^{2} (51.88 sq mi)

Population (2025)
  - Total: 40,988
  - Density: 305/km^{2} (790/sq mi)

Quảng Hà is a commune of Quảng Ninh City, Vietnam. It has been part of various other administrative districts, starting with Hải Hà district before 1969; the present structure took effect on 26 August 2026.

== History ==
The area of present-day Quảng Hà Commune formerly belonged to Hải Hà district, former Quảng Ninh Province. On 4 June 1969, Hà Cối District was merged with Đầm Hà district to form Quảng Hà district, with the aforementioned communes and township becoming part of Quảng Hà District.

On 16 January 1979, the Council of Government issued Decision No. 17-CP. Accordingly:

- Hà Cối Township was renamed Quảng Hà Township.
- Đại Điền Nam Commune was renamed Quảng Điền Commune.
- Hà Cối Nam Commune was renamed Quảng Trung Commune.

On 29 August 2001, Quảng Hà District was divided into two districts, Hải Hà (the former Hà Cối District) and Đầm Hà district, with Quảng Hà Township and the communes of Phú Hải, Quảng Điền, and Quảng Trung becoming part of Hải Hà District.

By 2018:

- Quảng Hà Township had an area of 1.44 km² and a population of 7,117, with a population density of 4,942 people/km², and consisted of 12 neighborhoods: Chu Văn An, Hoàng Hoa Thám, Lê Quý Đôn, Lý Thường Kiệt, My Sơn, Ngô Quyền, Nguyễn Du, Phan Đình Phùng, Trần Bình Trọng, Trần Khánh Dư, Trần Quốc Toản, and Yết Kiêu.
- Phú Hải Commune had an area of 8.91 km² and a population of 2,479, with a population density of 278 people/km², and consisted of three villages: Bắc, Trung, and Nam.
- Quảng Trung Commune had an area of 1.99 km² and a population of 1,395, with a population density of 701 people/km², and consisted of two villages: 1 and 2.
- Quảng Điền Commune had an area of 13.68 km² and a population of 3,824, with a population density of 280 people/km², and consisted of six villages: 1, 2, 3, 4, 5, and 6.

On 17 December 2019, the Standing Committee of the National Assembly of Vietnam issued Resolution No. 837/NQ-UBTVQH14 on the reorganization of district-level and commune-level administrative units in Quảng Ninh Province. The resolution took effect on 1 January 2020. Accordingly, the entire area and population of the three communes of Phú Hải, Quảng Trung, and Quảng Điền were merged into Quảng Hà Township.

On 16 June 2025:

- The National Assembly adopted Resolution No. 203/2025/QH15 amending and supplementing several articles of the Constitution of the Socialist Republic of Vietnam. The resolution took effect on 16 June 2025. Under the resolution, district-level administrative units throughout Vietnam ceased to operate from 1 July 2025.
- The Standing Committee of the National Assembly of Vietnam adopted Resolution No. 1679/NQ-UBTVQH15 on the reorganization of commune-level administrative units in Quảng Ninh Province in 2025. The resolution took effect on 16 June 2025. Accordingly, the entire natural area and population of Quảng Hà Township, the communes of Quảng Minh, Quảng Chính, and Quảng Phong, and part of Quảng Long Commune were merged to form a new commune named "Quảng Hà".

On 24 August 2026, the National Assembly adopted Resolution No. 36/2026/QH16 establishing Quảng Ninh City on the basis of the entire natural area and population of Quảng Ninh Province. The resolution took effect on 1 September 2026. Since then, Quảng Hà Commune has been part of Quảng Ninh City.
