= Hải Hà district =

Hải Hà district Huyện Hải Hà
- District
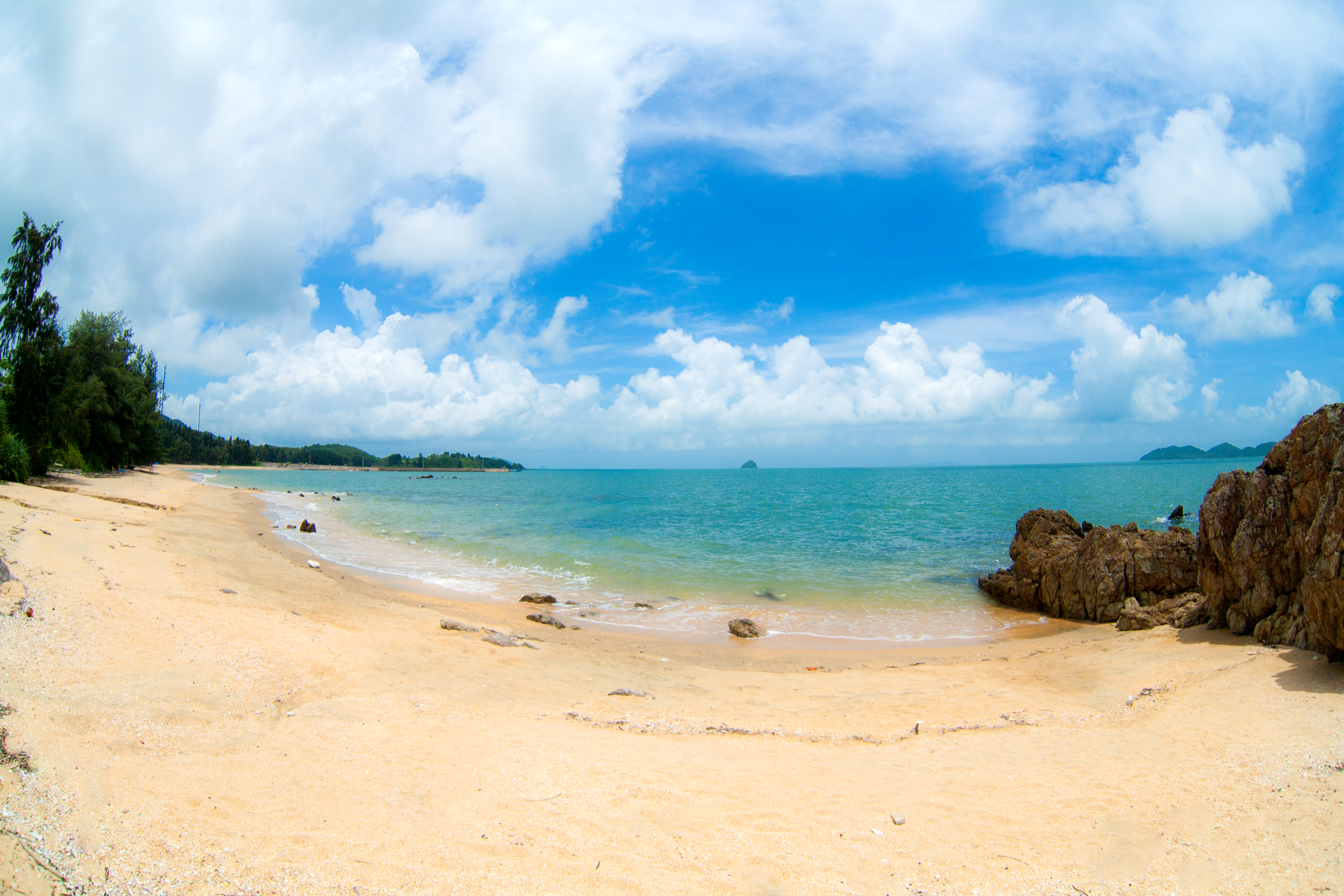
- Cái Chiên beach

- Seal
- Interactive map of Hải Hà district
- Location within Vietnam
- Country: Vietnam
- Region: Northeast
- Province: Quảng Ninh
- Founded: 2001
- Capital: Quảng Hà

Area
  - Total: 1,913 sq mi (4,955 km^{2})

Population (2019)
  - Total: 62.240
  - Density: 330/sq mi (126/km^{2})
  - Ethnicities: Kinh Dao Tay San Diu Nung
- Time zone: UTC+7 (UTC + 7)
- Website: haiha.quangninh.gov.vn

Hải Hà, formerly name is Hà Cối is a former rural district of Quảng Ninh province in the northeastern region of Vietnam. As of 2003, the district had a population of 50,878. The district covers an area of 495 km^{2}. The district capital lies at Quảng Hà.

== Administrative divisions ==
Quảng Hà, Quảng Minh, Quảng Thành, Quảng Thắng, Phú Hải, Quảng Chính, Quảng Trung, Quảng Điền, Quảng Phong, Quảng Long, Quảng Sơn, Đường Hoa, Tiến Tới, Quảng Đức, Quảng Thịnh and Cái Chiên.

== Climate ==
Climate data for Quảng Hà, Hải Hà District
| Month | Jan | Feb | Mar | Apr | May | Jun | Jul | Aug | Sep | Oct | Nov | Dec | Year |
|---|---|---|---|---|---|---|---|---|---|---|---|---|---|
| Mean daily maximum °C (°F) | 18.3 (64.9) | 19.2 (66.6) | 21.7 (71.1) | 26.0 (78.8) | 29.5 (85.1) | 31.1 (88.0) | 31.2 (88.2) | 31.4 (88.5) | 30.8 (87.4) | 28.6 (83.5) | 25.1 (77.2) | 20.9 (69.6) | 26.2 (79.2) |
| Daily mean °C (°F) | 15.3 (59.5) | 16.4 (61.5) | 19.3 (66.7) | 23.2 (73.8) | 26.2 (79.2) | 27.9 (82.2) | 28.0 (82.4) | 27.8 (82.0) | 26.9 (80.4) | 24.3 (75.7) | 20.6 (69.1) | 16.6 (61.9) | 22.7 (72.9) |
| Mean daily minimum °C (°F) | 12.9 (55.2) | 14.5 (58.1) | 17.3 (63.1) | 21.1 (70.0) | 23.7 (74.7) | 25.3 (77.5) | 25.4 (77.7) | 25.1 (77.2) | 24.0 (75.2) | 21.2 (70.2) | 17.5 (63.5) | 13.5 (56.3) | 20.1 (68.2) |
| Average precipitation mm (inches) | 55.0 (2.17) | 53.0 (2.09) | 71.1 (2.80) | 110.7 (4.36) | 271.1 (10.67) | 454.5 (17.89) | 630.0 (24.80) | 492.8 (19.40) | 302.0 (11.89) | 171.7 (6.76) | 76.1 (3.00) | 39.8 (1.57) | 2,729.7 (107.47) |
| Average rainy days | 11.0 | 13.9 | 15.9 | 13.3 | 15.1 | 18.6 | 20.8 | 17.7 | 12.6 | 8.6 | 7.1 | 7.1 | 161.8 |
| Average relative humidity (%) | 77.0 | 89.0 | 93.0 | 90.0 | 84.0 | 84.0 | 83.0 | 87.0 | 89.0 | 84.0 | 81.0 | 85.0 | 85.5 |
Source: Vietnam Institute for Building Science and Technology
