= Sơn Động =

- Commune
- Interactive map of Sơn Động
- Coordinates: 21.33400301056734°N 106.84940810982447°E
- Country: Vietnam
- Region: Red River Delta
- Municipality: Bắc Ninh
- Established: 16 June 2025

Area
  - Total: 78.72 km^{2} (30.39 sq mi)

Population (2024)
  - Total: 24,394
  - Density: 309/km^{2} (800/sq mi)
- Website: sondong.bacninh.gov.vn

Sơn Động is a commune in the municipality of Bắc Ninh, Vietnam.

On 12 June 2025, the National Assembly of Vietnam adopted Resolution No. 202/2025/QH15 on the reorganization of provincial-level administrative units (effective from 12 June 2025). Under the resolution, the entire area and population of Bắc Giang province and Bắc Ninh province were merged to form a new province named Bắc Ninh.

On 16 June 2025:

- The National Assembly of Vietnam adopted Resolution No. 203/2025/QH15 amending and supplementing several articles of the Constitution of Vietnam (effective from 16 June 2025). Under the resolution, district-level administrative units nationwide ceased to operate from 1 July 2025.
- The Standing Committee of the National Assembly of Vietnam issued Resolution No. 1658/NQ-UBTVQH15 on the arrangement of commune-level administrative units in Bắc Ninh province in 2025 (effective from 16 June 2025). Under the resolution, the entire area and population of An Châu township, An Bá commune, and Vĩnh An commune were merged to form a new commune named Sơn Động.

On 24 August 2026, the National Assembly adopted Resolution No. 39/2026/QH16 on the establishment of the municipality of Bắc Ninh from the entire area and population of Bắc Ninh province (effective from 20 September 2026). Since then, Sơn Động Commune has been part of the municipality of Bắc Ninh.
