= Lục Ngạn =

Coordinates: 21°23′05″N 106°40′28″E

- Commune and village
- Interactive map of Lục Ngạn
- Country: Vietnam
- City: Bắc Ninh

Area
  - Total: 31.93 sq mi (82.71 km^{2})

Population
  - Total: 42,367
  - Density: 1,327/sq mi (512.2/km^{2})
- Time zone: UTC+07:00

Lục Ngạn is a commune (xã) and village in Bắc Ninh, in northeastern Vietnam.

On June 16, 2025, the Standing Committee of the National Assembly issued Resolution No. 1658/NQ-UBTVQH15 regarding the arrangement of commune-level administrative units in Bắc Ninh Province in 2025. Accordingly, the entire natural area and population of Phì Điền township and the communes of Giáp Sơn, Đồng Cốc, Tân Hoa, and Tân Quang were reorganized to form a new commune named Lục Ngạn.
