= 1881 Haiphong typhoon =

Pacific typhoon in 1881

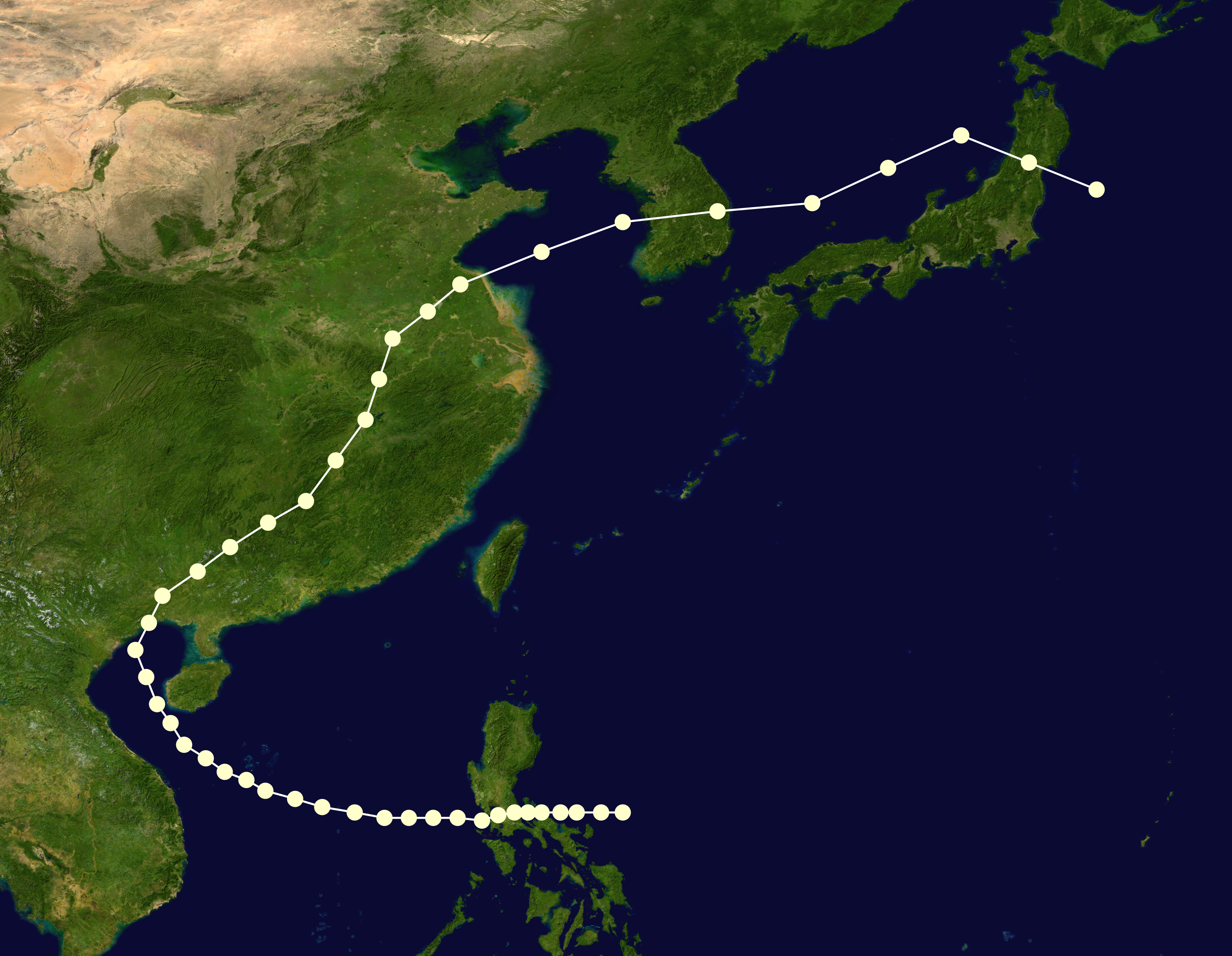
- Track of the 1881 Haiphong typhoon

Meteorological history
- Formed: September 27, 1881
- Dissipated: October 8, 1881

Typhoon
- Lowest pressure: 957 hPa (mbar); 28.26 inHg

Overall effects
- Fatalities: ~3,000
- Areas affected: Haiphong, Northern Vietnam; Luzon, Captaincy General of the Philippines (now Philippines)
- Part of the 1881 Pacific typhoon season

The 1881 Haiphong typhoon was a devastating typhoon that struck Haiphong, in northern Dai Nam (now Vietnam), and the northern part of the Captaincy General of the Philippines (now the Philippines) on October 8, 1881. The typhoon was first detected east of Southern Luzon on September 27, 1881. The typhoon killed about 3,000 people in total.

== Meteorological history ==
While the storm's strength is uncertain (like many disasters prior to the 20th century), records show that the storm was first detected near the Philippines in late September and the system hit Luzon on September 30. Once it was in the South China Sea, it is speculated the storm strengthened again as it entered the Gulf of Tonkin, passing very close to Hainan before it hit the city of Haiphong. The storm then began to move northwards, before exiting China. The storm would go on to hit the Korean Peninsula, and then Japan.

== Impacts ==
The typhoon first moved through the Philippines, causing heavy damage on Camarines, Tayabas, and Batangas.

The city of Haiphong lies about 10 miles from the coast of the Gulf of Tonkin and also on the Red River in a low elevation area (delta), connected to an access channel. The town was founded seven years before the typhoon struck. Haiphong, being a low-lying port town, was devastated both physically and economically. Its geography only worsened the damage. With the high waves and winds, rice fields were flooded, buildings were decimated (and, as a result, people either were drowned or left stranded), trees were ripped up, etc. By the time the typhoon passed, most of the town was wiped out. Then, due to the inability to operate as a port town, Haiphong's economy also took impact.

The typhoon killed about 3,000 people in Haiphong, Vietnam. There were erroneous reports that the typhoon was the third-deadliest tropical cyclone on record with a death toll of 300,000, but this was likely due to mixing the death toll with the damage total, as the city only had a population of 18,480 in 1897.

== Aftermath ==
Any typhoon like the 1881 Haiphong typhoon would be a rare occurrence because its path around Hainan is what made it so strong by the time it hit Haiphong. It would take another 143 years for a typhoon like this to happen again - Typhoon Yagi in 2024 made landfall near Haiphong and wreaked havoc on the city. The Vietnamese government has also taken action in case of another severe typhoon hitting the area. Haiphong now has a flood defense system including dykes/levees (though not all of them are firm), a flood warning service provided by Vietnam's Meteorological Service, and evacuation plans. However, Haiphong still serves as a port (and a major one today), so any large storms will harm the economy.

== See also ==
- Typhoon Son-Tinh (2012) – a Category 3 storm that intensified in the Gulf of Tonkin.
- Typhoon Haiyan (2013) – affected Vietnam as a weakening typhoon after it slammed the Philippines as a Category 5.
- Typhoon Yagi (2024) – a powerful typhoon that struck near the same area as a Category 4 storm.
