= Hàm Yên district =

Coordinates: 22.000°N 105.000°E

Hàm Yên district Huyện Hàm Yên
- District
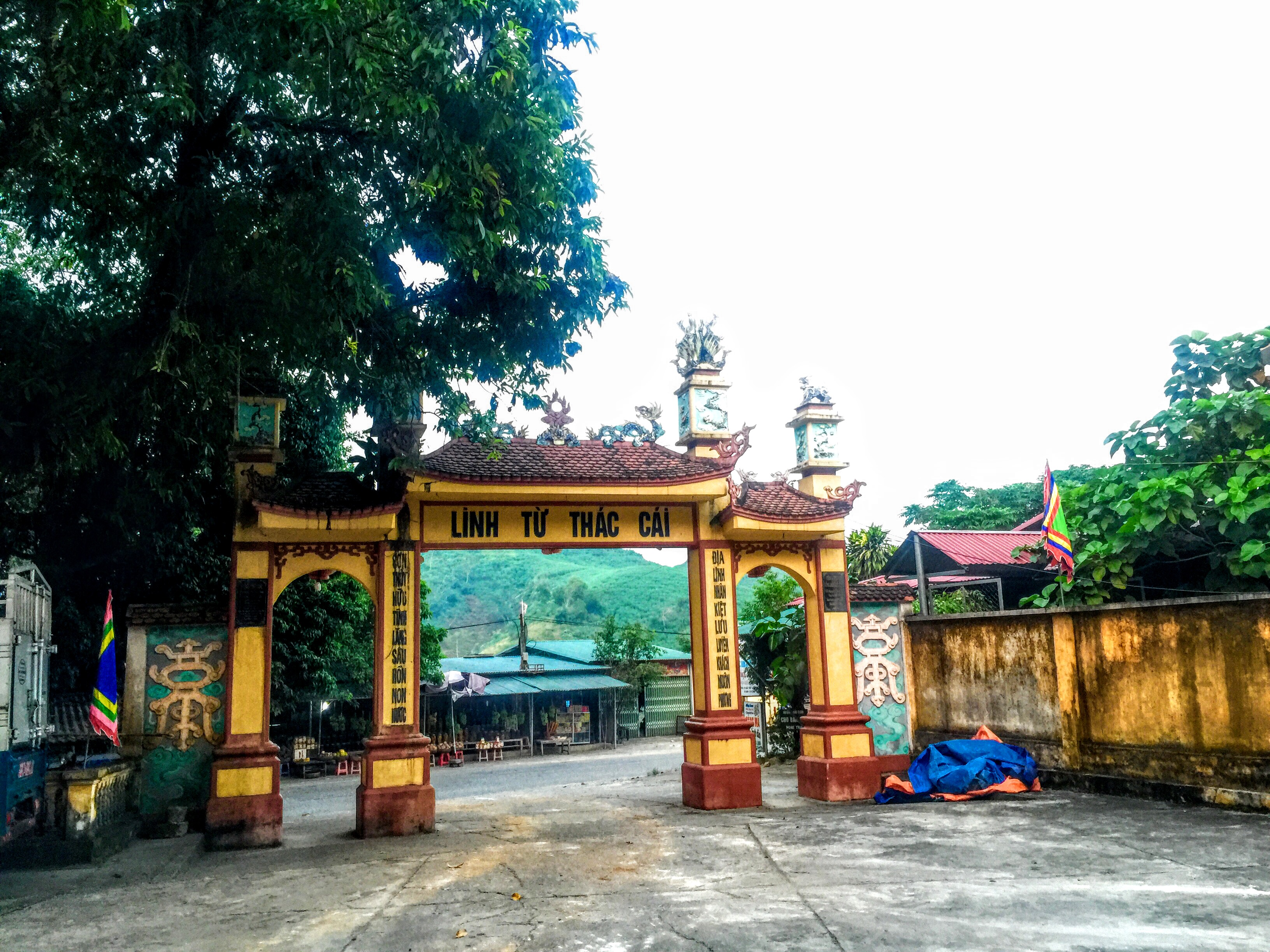
- Đền Thác Cái temple

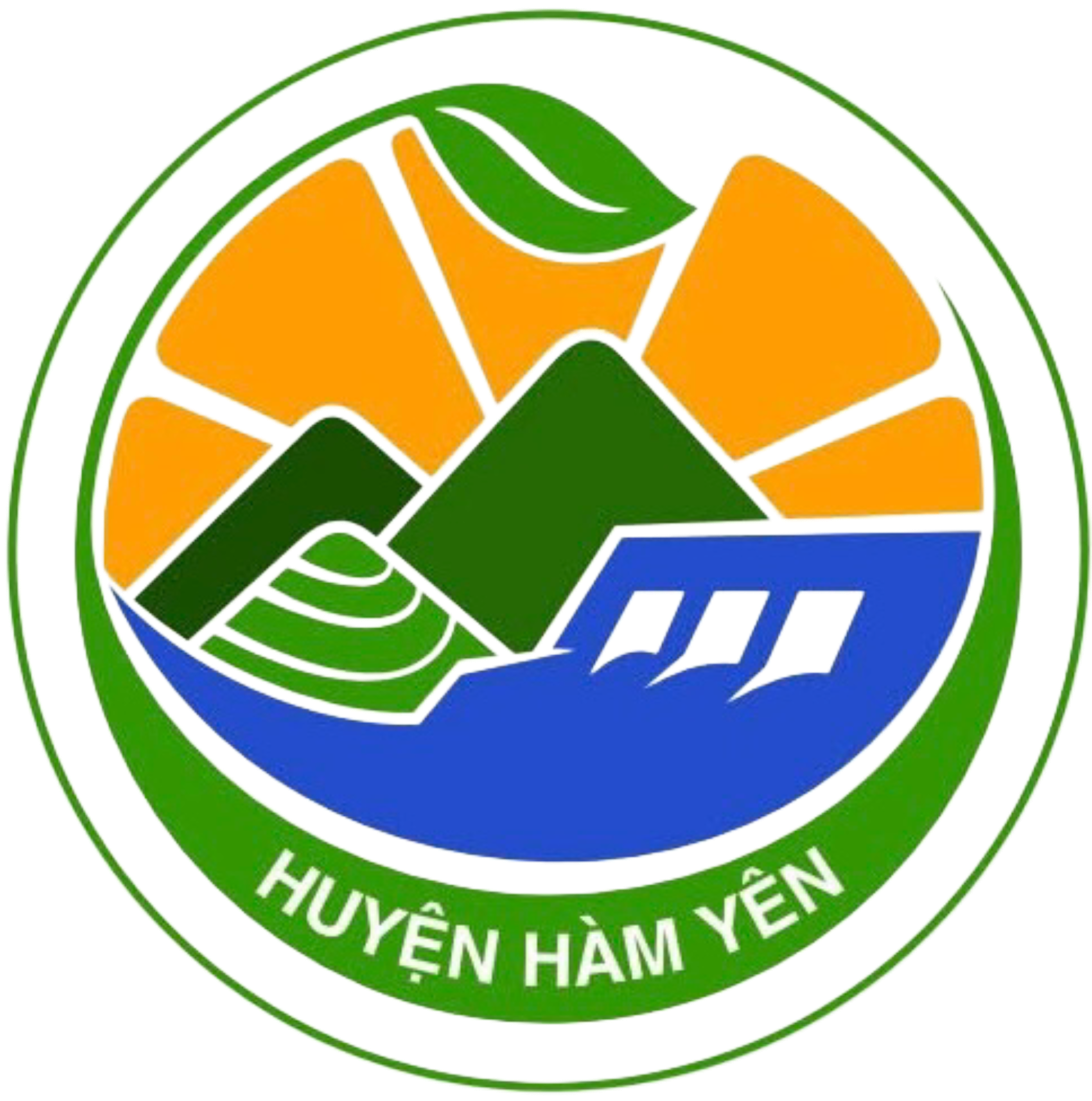
- Seal
- Interactive map of Hàm Yên district
- Country: Vietnam
- Region: Northeast
- Province: Tuyên Quang
- Capital: Tân Yên

Area
  - Total: 350 sq mi (907 km^{2})

Population (2008)
  - Total: 109,000
- Time zone: UTC+7 (UTC + 7)

Hàm Yên is a former rural district of Tuyên Quang province in the Northeast region of Vietnam. As of 2003 the district had a population of 104,648. The district covers an area of 898 km^{2}. The district capital lies at Tân Yên.

== Administrative divisions ==
Thị trấn Tân Yên, xã Hùng Đức, xã Bằng Cốc, xã Thành Long, xã Thái Hòa, xã Đức Ninh, xã Thái Sơn, xã Bình Xa, xã Nhân Mục, xã Yên Phú, xã Tân Thành, xã Minh Hương, xã Phù Lưu, xã Minh Dân, xã Yên Lâm, xã Minh Khương, xã Bạch Xa, xã Yên Thuận.

According to Khâm Định Việt Sử Thông Giám Cương Mục, which references the Geography Book of Tang, Hàm Yên was named Đô Kim District (châu Đô Kim) by the Tang under their rule during the Third Era of Northern Domination. That name was kept until the Ly dynasty.

== Climate ==
Climate data for Hàm Yên
Month	Jan	Feb	Mar	Apr	May	Jun	Jul	Aug	Sep	Oct	Nov	Dec	Year
Record high °C (°F)	32.2 (90.0)	34.0 (93.2)	36.9 (98.4)	38.5 (101.3)	41.5 (106.7)	40.0 (104.0)	39.4 (102.9)	39.1 (102.4)	38.3 (100.9)	35.7 (96.3)	34.3 (93.7)	32.3 (90.1)	41.5 (106.7)
Mean daily maximum °C (°F)	19.8 (67.6)	21.1 (70.0)	24.0 (75.2)	28.2 (82.8)	32.1 (89.8)	33.3 (91.9)	33.3 (91.9)	33.1 (91.6)	32.3 (90.1)	29.6 (85.3)	25.9 (78.6)	22.1 (71.8)	27.9 (82.2)
Daily mean °C (°F)	15.7 (60.3)	17.3 (63.1)	20.3 (68.5)	24.0 (75.2)	27.0 (80.6)	28.2 (82.8)	28.3 (82.9)	27.9 (82.2)	26.7 (80.1)	24.2 (75.6)	20.5 (68.9)	17.0 (62.6)	23.1 (73.6)
Mean daily minimum °C (°F)	13.4 (56.1)	15.1 (59.2)	18.0 (64.4)	21.4 (70.5)	23.7 (74.7)	25.1 (77.2)	25.2 (77.4)	24.9 (76.8)	23.8 (74.8)	21.3 (70.3)	17.5 (63.5)	14.1 (57.4)	20.3 (68.5)
Record low °C (°F)	−0.6 (30.9)	4.3 (39.7)	5.4 (41.7)	8.9 (48.0)	16.1 (61.0)	17.7 (63.9)	19.5 (67.1)	21.1 (70.0)	15.9 (60.6)	10.2 (50.4)	5.1 (41.2)	0.2 (32.4)	−0.6 (30.9)
Average precipitation mm (inches)	32.6 (1.28)	35.2 (1.39)	57.8 (2.28)	123.6 (4.87)	233.1 (9.18)	286.4 (11.28)	339.9 (13.38)	321.5 (12.66)	195.4 (7.69)	117.1 (4.61)	49.2 (1.94)	28.0 (1.10)	1,819.8 (71.65)
Average rainy days	11.9	12.9	15.8	15.9	15.2	16.7	19.3	19.2	13.8	10.8	8.5	7.5	167.7
Average relative humidity (%)	86.3	86.3	86.3	85.8	83.9	85.4	86.0	87.1	86.3	86.0	85.6	85.0	85.8
Mean monthly sunshine hours	48.8	53.1	49.9	99.9	165.8	158.4	168.5	166.3	155.7	126.2	107.6	77.2	1,363.5
Source: Vietnam Institute for Building Science and Technology
