= National Center for Hydro-Meteorological Forecasting =

National meteorological service of Vietnam

- Trung tâm Dự báo khí tượng thuỷ văn quốc gia

Agency overview
- Formed: 9 January 2003; 23 years ago
- Jurisdiction: Government of Vietnam
- Headquarters: Floor 12, No. 24 Huynh Thuc Lang Street, Lang Ward, Hanoi, Vietnam
- Parent department: Ministry of Agriculture and Environment
- Parent agency: Vietnam Meteorological and Hydrological Administration
- Website: kttv.gov.vn/kttvsite/ nchmf.gov.vn/kttvsite/

The National Center for Hydro-Meteorological Forecasting (Note: Also spelt National Centre for Hydro-Meteorological Forecasting.) (NCHMF; Vietnamese: Trung tâm Dự báo khí tượng thủy văn quốc gia, lit. 'Center for National forecasting of meteorology and hydrology') is the central and national-level meteorological and weather forecasting service of Vietnam. It belongs to Vietnam Meteorological and Hydrological Administration (VNMHA) under the Ministry of Agriculture and Environment with authority to issue forecasting and warning information for weather, climate, hydrology, water resource, marine weather (i.e. hydro-meteorology) and provide hydro-meteorology services.

== History ==
The National Center for Hydro-Meteorological Forecasting was founded on 9 January 2003. At the time of establishment, its Vietnamese name was Trung tâm Dự báo Khí tượng Thủy văn Trung ương (lit. 'Center for Central-level Forecasting of Meteorology and Hydrology'). However, the NCHMF previously stated that it was founded on 16 May 1995 from the Cục dự báo KTTV (lit. 'Meteo-Hydrorological Forecasting Bureau'), as Trung tâm Quốc gia Dự báo khí tượng thuỷ văn (lit. 'Center for National Meteorology and Hydrology Forecasting').

In November 2016, it was determined that the NCHMF's Vietnamese name would be changed to Trung tâm Dự báo khí tượng thủy văn quốc gia.

It was re-established again on 8 April 2025 as a part of the new Vietnam Meteorological and Hydrological Administration (Cục Khí tượng Thủy văn), after the foundation of the Ministry of Agriculture and Environment. It happened just months after Typhoon Yagi made historical impacts on Vietnam.
