= XXIV Corps =

24 Corps, 24th Corps, Twenty Fourth Corps, or XXIV Corps may refer to:

== Germany ==
- XXIV Reserve Corps, Imperial German Army, World War I
- XXIV Army Corps (Wehrmacht), World War II

== Italy ==
- XXIV Army Corps (Italy)

== Russia and Soviet Union ==
- 24th Army Corps (Russian Empire)

=== Soviet Union ===
- 24th Rifle Corps
- 24th Mechanized Corps
- 24th Tank Corps

== United Kingdom ==
- 24th (Budleigh Salterton) Devonshire Rifle Volunteer Corps
- 24th Middlesex Volunteer Rifle Corps
- 24th (Havelock's Own) Surrey Rifle Volunteer Corps
- 24th (Eccleshill) Yorkshire West Riding Rifle Volunteer Corps

== United States ==
- XXIV Corps (Union Army), American Civil War
- XXIV Corps (United States)

== See also ==
- List of military corps by number
- 24th Army (disambiguation)
- 24th Battalion (disambiguation)
- 24th Brigade (disambiguation)
- 24th Division (disambiguation)
- 24th Regiment (disambiguation)
- 24th Squadron (disambiguation)
- 24th (disambiguation)
