= 24th Army =

24th Army may refer to:

- 24th Group Army, People's Liberation Army
- 24th Air Army, Soviet Union
- 24th Army (Soviet Union)
- 24th Army (Wehrmacht)

== See also ==
- List of armies by number
- XXIV Corps (disambiguation)
- 24th Division (disambiguation)
- 24th Brigade (disambiguation)
- 24th Regiment (disambiguation)
- 24th Battalion (disambiguation)
- 24th Squadron (disambiguation)
- 24th (disambiguation)
