= 24th Cavalry =

24th Cavalry may refer to:

== Divisions ==
- 24th Cavalry Division (Soviet Union)
- 24th Cavalry Division (United States)

== Regiments, battalions, and companies ==
- 24th Cavalry (Frontier Force)
- 24th Cavalry Regiment (United States)
- 24th (Metropolitan Mounted Rifles) Battalion, Imperial Yeomanry
- 24th (Westmorland and Cumberland) Company, Imperial Yeomanry

=== American Civil War regiments ===
==== Confederate Army ====
- 24th and 25th Consolidated Texas Cavalry Regiment
- 24th Virginia Cavalry Regiment

== See also ==
- 24th Division (disambiguation)
- 24th Regiment (disambiguation)
- 24th (disambiguation)
