= 24th =

24th is the ordinal form of the number 24. 24th or twenty-fourth may also refer to:

- A fraction, 1/24, equal to one of 24 equal parts
- 24th of the month, a recurring calendar date

== Geography ==
- 24th meridian east, a line of longitude
- 24th meridian west, a line of longitude
- 24th parallel north, a circle of latitude
- 24th parallel south, a circle of latitude
- 24th Avenue
- 24th Street (disambiguation)

== Military ==
- 24th Army (disambiguation)
- 24th Battalion (disambiguation)
- 24th Brigade (disambiguation)
- 24th Division (disambiguation)
- 24th Regiment (disambiguation)
- 24th Squadron (disambiguation)

== Other ==
- Twenty-fourth Amendment (disambiguation)
  - Twenty-fourth Amendment to the United States Constitution
- 24th century
- 24th century BC

== See also ==
- 24 (disambiguation)
