= 24 Hours =

24 Hours or Twenty Four Hours may also refer to:

== Film and television ==
- 24 Hours (1931 film), a 1931 drama
- 24 Hours (2000 film), a Russian film
- 24 Hours (2002 film), a Croatian anthology film
- 24 Hrs (film), a 2010 Malayalam language film
- 24 Hours (TV programme), a BBC news and current affairs series
- 24Hours (TV program), the name of CBWT Winnipeg's local newscast between 1970 and 2000
- "24 Hours" (ER), the pilot episode of the medical drama series ER

== Music ==
=== Bands and people ===
- 24hrs (rapper) (born 1990), American singer and rapper
- 24Hours (band), a South Korean rock band
- Twenty Four Hours (band), an Italian rock band

=== Albums and extended plays ===
- 24 Hours (Tom Jones album), a 2008 album by Tom Jones
- 24 Hours (The Kleptones album), 2006
- 24 Hrs (album), a 2016 album by Olly Murs
- 24H (EP), by Seventeen, 2020
- 24 Hours, a 2011 album by Richie Kotzen

=== Songs ===
- "24 Hours" (A Boogie wit da Hoodie song), 2021
- "24 Hours" (Agnes song), 2021
- "24 Hours" (Sunmi song), 2013
- "24 Hours" (TeeFlii song), 2014
- "24 Hours", a 1983 song by 10cc from Windows in the Jungle
- "24 Hours", a 2005 song by Alexz Johnson
- "24 Hours", a 2007 song by Andrea Corr from Ten Feet High
- "Twenty Four Hours", a song by Athlete from their 2005 album Tourist
- "24 Hours", a 1990 song by Betty Boo from Boomania
- "24 Hours", a 2005 song by Cueshé
- "24 Hours", a song by Duncan Faure from the 1987 soundtrack Who's That Girl
- "24 Hours" (or "Twenty Four Hours"), a 1953 song by Eddie Boyd
- "24 Hours", a 2011 song by Gucci Mane from The Return of Mr. Zone 6
- "24Hrs", a song by Itzy from their 2020 EP It'z Me
- "Twenty Four Hours", a song by Joy Division from their 1980 album Closer
- "24 Hours", a 2013 song by Sky Ferreira from Night Time, My Time
- "24 Hours", a song by Shawn Mendes from his 2020 album Wonder
- "24 Hours", a song by Vengaboys from their 1999 album The Party Album

== Other ==
- 24 Hours (magazine), the previous name of Limelight, an Australian classical music and arts magazine
- 24 Hours (novel), a 2000 novel by Greg Iles
- 24 Hours (newspaper), a chain of free daily newspapers published in Canada
- 24 Hours of Le Mans, the world's oldest active sports car race
- 24HR Art, former name of Northern Centre for Contemporary Art, Darwin, Australia
- Twenty Four Hours (sculpture), a 1960 sculpture by Sir Anthony Caro

== See also ==
- 24-hour clock
- 24 Hour Television: Love Saves The Earth, a Japanese telethon program
- 24 Heures (disambiguation)
- 24sata (Croatia), a Croatian newspaper
- 24 sata (Serbia), a newspaper from Serbia
- Il Sole 24 Ore, an Italian daily business newspaper
- 24 Chasa, a Bulgarian newspaper
- 24 Horas (disambiguation)
- 24 Oras, a Philippine early evening newscast
- 24 Hours a Day (disambiguation)
