= Channel 24 =

Channel 24 or TV24 may refer to several television, radio stations or websites:

- Channel 24 (Bangladesh), a Bengali-language television channel in Bangladesh
- Channel 24 (Israel), a Hebrew-language television channel in Israel
- Channel 24 (Pakistan), an Urdu-language television channel in Pakistan
- 24tv.ua, a Ukrainian-language television channel in Ukraine
- WEAC TV24, an East Alabama television news station
- ABC News 24, the former name of Australian television news channel ABC News (Australian TV channel), launched and owned by the Australian Broadcasting Corporation
- Nederland 24, a number of specialty digital television channels from Netherlands Public Broadcasting
- 24ore.tv, a financial news TV channel in Italy 2001–2007
- Channels TV 24, a 24-hour overseas news channel from Nigeria
- Channel24, a South African website operated by News24
- Radio Norge, a Norwegian radio channel formerly known as Kanal 24
- NTV News24, a Japanese television news channel
- KBS News 24, a South Korean television news channel
- 3/24, the former name of Catalan television news channel 3CatInfo (TV channel)
- 24 (Slovak TV channel), a Slovak television news channel
- YTN, a South Korean television news channel whose cable channel number was 24 at launch
- Russia-24, a Russian television news channel
- ČT24, a Czech television news channel
- SVT24, a Swedish television news channel
- Rai News 24, an Italian television news channel
- TgCom24, an Italian television news channel
  - TgCom24 (Canadian TV channel)
- Sky TG24
  - Sky TG24 Canada
- Tagesschau24, a German television news channel
- BR24, a German radio station
  - BR24live, a German radio station
- 24 Horas (Spanish TV channel), a Spanish television news channel
- TVN24
  - TVN24 BiS
- N24, the former name of German television news channel Welt (TV channel)
- América 24, an Argentine television news channel
- TVi24, the former name of Portuguese television news channel CNN Portugal
- 24KZ, a Kazakhstani television news channel
- Polskie Radio 24, a Polish radio station
- France 24, a French international television news channel
- News24 (Australia), an Australian television news channel

== Canada ==
The following television stations broadcast on digital channel 24 (UHF frequencies covering 530-536 MHz) in Canada:

- CHKL-DT in Kelowna, British Columbia
- CICO-DT-24 in Ottawa, Ontario
- CIVS-DT in Sherbrooke, Quebec

The following television stations operate on virtual channel 24 in Canada:

- CICO-DT-24 in Ottawa, Ontario
- CIVS-DT in Sherbrooke, Quebec

== Mexico ==
The following television stations broadcast on virtual channel 24 in Mexico:

- XHPBQR-TDT in Querétaro, Querétaro
- XHZHZ-TDT in Zacatecas, Zacatecas

== See also ==
- Channel 24 TV stations in Mexico
- Channel 24 digital TV stations in the United States
- Channel 24 virtual TV stations in the United States
- Channel 24 low-power TV stations in the United States
- Kanal 24 (disambiguation)
- 24 (disambiguation)
