= 24th Mechanized Division =

24th Mechanized Division may refer to:

- 24th Guards Mechanized Division, Soviet Union
- 24th Mechanized Division (Soviet Union)
- 24th Mechanized Division (Ukraine)
- 24th Infantry Division (United States), a mechanized infantry division

== See also ==
- 24th Division (disambiguation)
