= 260th Infantry Division =

WWII German infantry division

- German: 260. Infanterie-Division
- Active: 26 August 1939 – 9 July 1944
- Country: Nazi Germany
- Branch: Heer (Wehrmacht)
- Type: Infantry
- Size: Division
- Engagements: Phony War; Battle of France (reserves); Eastern Front

Commanders
- Notable commanders: Hans Schmidt; Walther Hahm; Dietrich von Choltitz; Alexander Conrady

The 260th Infantry Division (German: 260. Infanterie-Division) was an infantry division of the German Heer during World War II.

== History ==
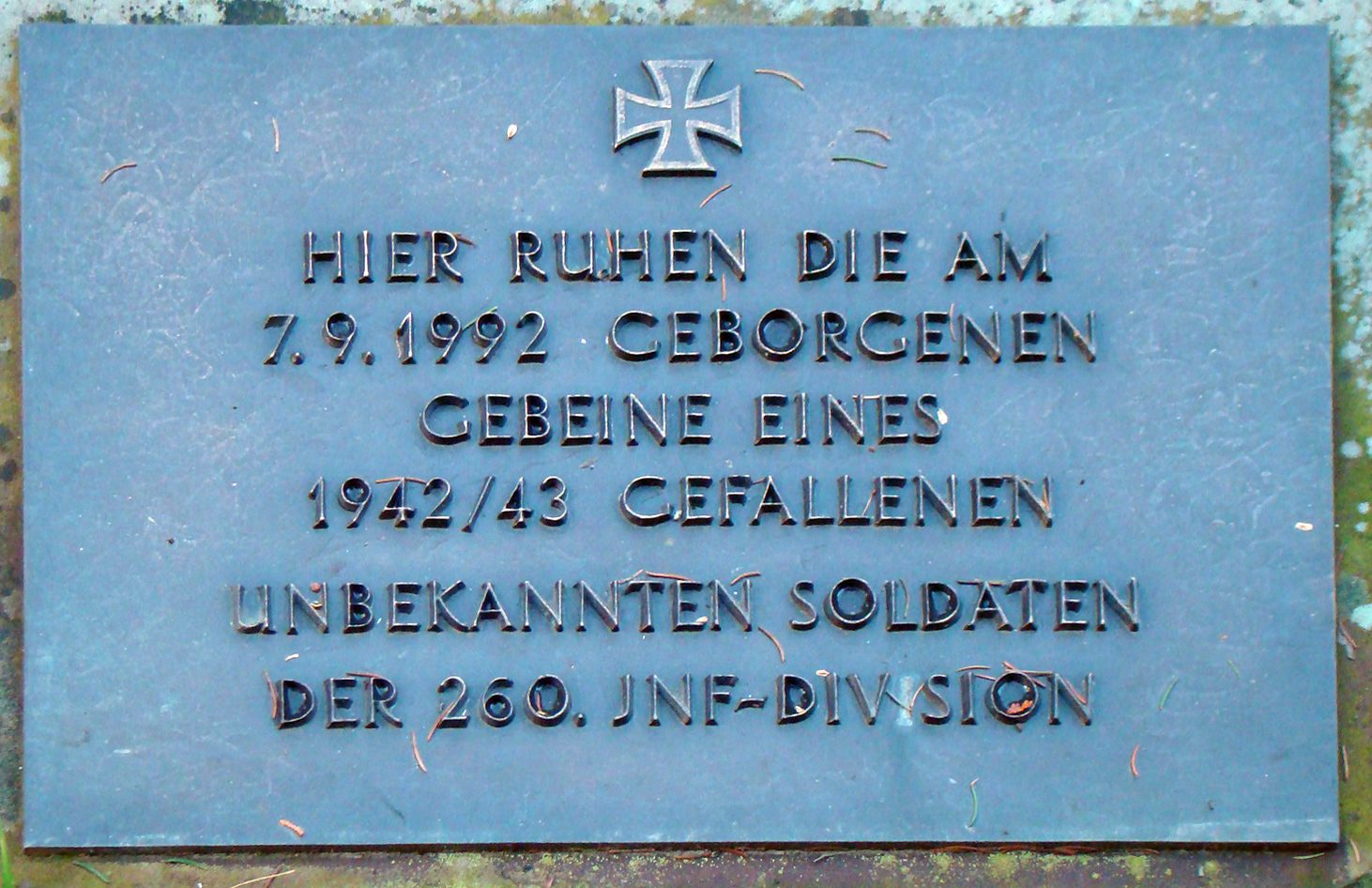
Ludwigsburg grave of an unknown soldier of the 260th Infantry Division, killed in action in 1942/43

The 260th Infantry Division was formed in Karlsruhe (Wehrkreis V) on 26 August 1939, the day of German mobilization, as a division of the fourth Aufstellungswelle. It initially consisted of the Infantry Regiments 460, 470, and 480, which were formed from various replacement battalions. Infantry Regiment 460 was formed from the Replacement Battalions 14 (Weingarten), 56 (Biberach), and 119 (Esslingen), Infantry Regiment 470 from the Replacement Battalions 34 (Heilbronn), 13 (Ludwigsburg), and 35 (Tübingen), and Infantry Regiment 480 from the Replacement Battalions 21 (Nuremberg), 42 (Hof), and 55 (Würzburg). Additionally, the 260th Infantry Division was equipped with the four artillery detachments of Artillery Regiment 260 and the Division Units 260, the later Pioneer Battalion 653. The initial commander of the division was Hans Schmidt.

The division was sent to the Upper Rhine region in October 1939, and spent the Battle of France in the reserves of OKH. It subsequently was placed on occupation duty in France and remained there until July 1941.

On 30 January 1940, the division passed an infantry battalion and an artillery battery to the 296th Infantry Division of the eighth Aufstellungswelle, and later an additional third of the division's strength to the 125th Infantry Division of the eleventh Aufstellungswelle on 21 October 1940. These transferred units were later replaced with division reservists and fresh recruits.

The 260th Infantry Division joined Operation Barbarossa between July and August 1941, and subsequently fought at Kiev, Babruysk, and Moscow before participating in the defensive operations against the Soviet winter campaign of 1941–42.

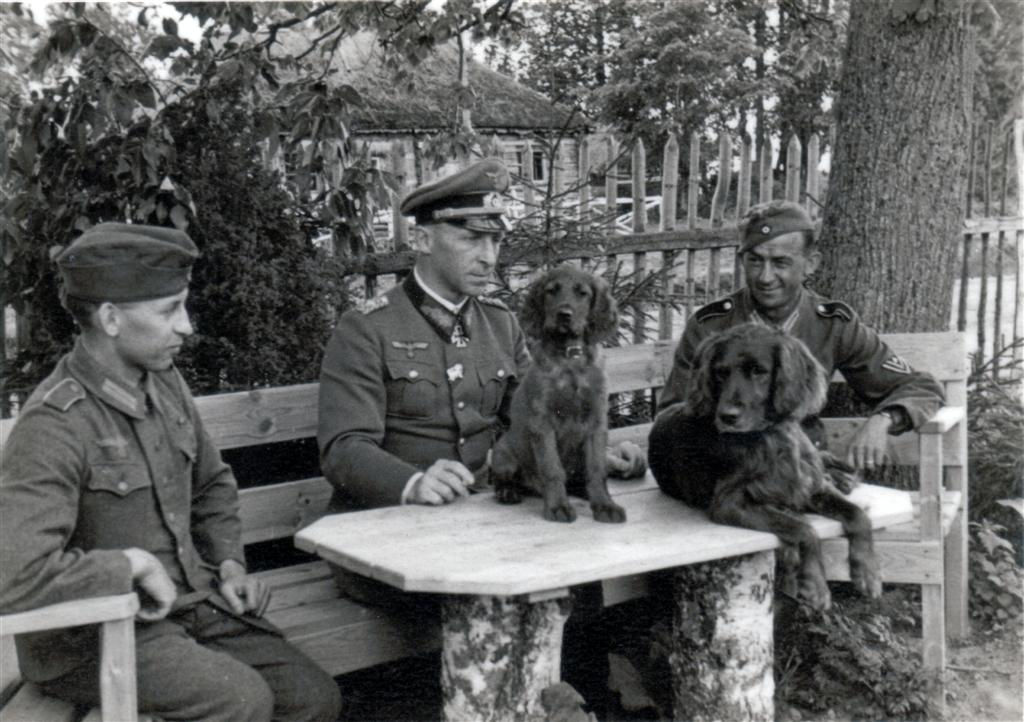
Walther Hahm, twice commander of the 260th Division during 1942/43 (photographed in May 1943).

On 1 January 1942, Walther Hahm took command of the division.

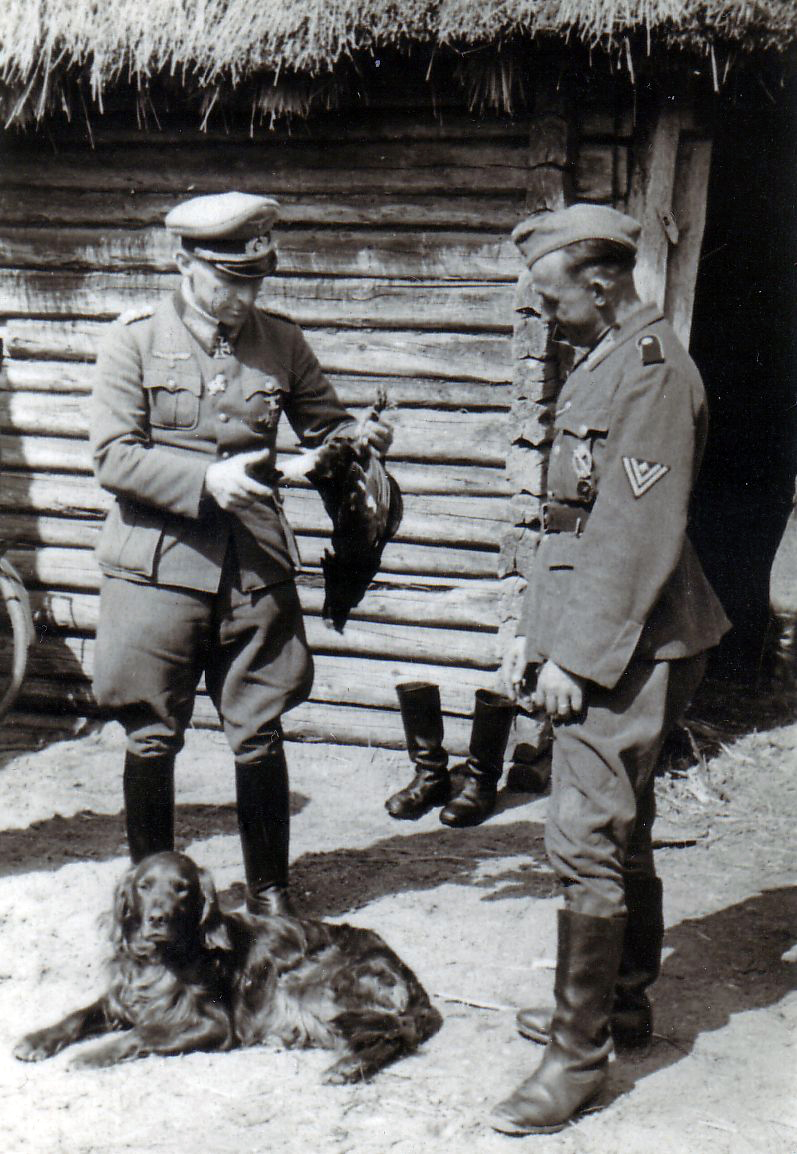
Walther Hahm during his time as commander of the 260th Division, pictured in the Soviet Union

In 1942, the third battalions of each of the three divisional regiments were dissolved due to casualties, downgrading the division from nine to six battalions across three regiments.

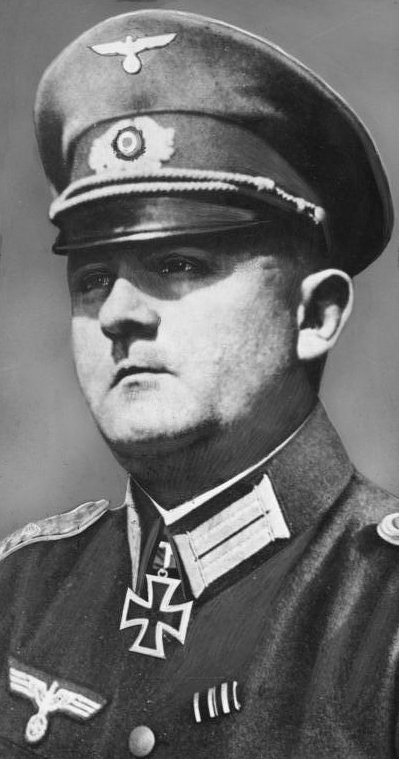
Dietrich von Choltitz, divisional commander of the 260th Division in mid-to-late 1942.

Between May and August 1942, the 260th Infantry Division fought at Spas-Demensk. On 27 August 1942, Dietrich von Choltitz took command of the division. He would hold the post until 6 October, upon which Hahm returned to a second tenure as division commander.

In summer 1943, Grenadier Regiment 470 was dissolved and its two battalions became the third battalions of each of the other regiments, thus shifting the 260th Infantry Division from a division of three regiments with two battalions each to a division of two regiments with three battalions each.

Between September 1943 and May 1944, the 260th Infantry Division took part in the defense of the Mogilev sector. On 9 November 1943, Robert Schlüter took command of the division.

In October 1943, the second battalion of Grenadier Regiment 367 of the 214th Infantry Division in occupied Norway was given to the 260th Infantry Division as Division Fusilier Battalion 260.

In April 1944, the two battalions of the dissolved Grenadier Regiment 470 were taken out of their respective regiments and the Grenadier Regiment 470 redeployed. With the addition of the Division Fusilier Battalion 260 of October 1943, the 260th Infantry Division had thus become a Division neuer Art 44, a division of three regiments of two battalions each that was additionally strengthened by a seventh independent battalion. On 21 April 1944, Alexander Conrady took command of the division, before he was replaced by Günther Klammt on 1 May 1944. Klammt would be the last commander of the 260th Infantry Division.

The 260th Infantry Division was captured and destroyed near Minsk on 9 July 1944. The divisional commander, Günter Klammt, was taken prisoner by the Red Army and would remain in captivity until 1955. Its status is listed as "unknown" in the German documents of July 1944. The division was not redeployed.

== Superior formations ==
Organizational chart of the 260th Infantry Division
Year	Month	Army Corps	Army	Army Group	Area
1939	September	Army reserves.	7th Army	Army Group C	Upper Rhine
1939	October – December	XXV	7th Army	Army Group C	Upper Rhine
1940	January	XXV	7th Army	Army Group C	Upper Rhine
1940	May	OKH reserves.			Donaueschingen
1940	June	XIII	12th Army	Army Group A	Rethel
1940	July	XXV	12th Army	Army Group C	Dijon
1940	August	XVIII	12th Army	Army Group C	Belfort
1940	September – October	XXVII	1st Army	Army Group C	France
1940	November – December	XXVII	1st Army	Army Group D	France
1941	January – April	XXVII	1st Army	Army Group D	France
1941	May – June	HK XXXXV	1st Army	Army Group D	France
1941	July	OKH reserves. Moving towards Army Group Center.			Brest-Litovsk
1941	August	XXXXIII	2nd Army	Army Group Center	Babruysk
1941	September – October	XIII	2nd Army	Army Group Center	Kiev / Bryansk
1941	November – December	XIII	4th Army	Army Group Center	Moscow
1942	January – April	XIII	4th Army	Army Group Center	Ugra
1942	May – December	XII	4th Army	Army Group Center	Spas-Demensk
1943	January – August	XII	4th Army	Army Group Center	Spas-Demensk
1943	September	XII	9th Army	Army Group Center	Mogilev
1943	October – December	XXXXI	9th Army	Army Group Center	Mogilev
1944	January	XXIII	4th Army	Army Group Center	Mogilev
1944	February – May	XII	4th Army	Army Group Center	Mogilev
1944	June	XXVII	4th Army	Army Group Center	Orsha / Minsk
1944	July	"Status unknown" (i.e. destroyed).			

== Noteworthy individuals ==
- Hans Schmidt, commander between 26 August 1939 and 1 January 1942.
- Walther Hahm, commander between 1 January 1942 and 27 August 1942 as well as between 6 October 1942 and 9 November 1943.
- Dietrich von Choltitz, commander between 27 August 1942 and 6 October 1942.
- Robert Schlüter, commander between 9 November 1943 and 21 April 1944.
- Alexander Conrady, commander between 21 April 1944 and 1 May 1944.
- Günther Klammt, commander between 1 May 1944 and the destruction of the division.
