= Jacob L. Devers =

US Army general (1887–1979)

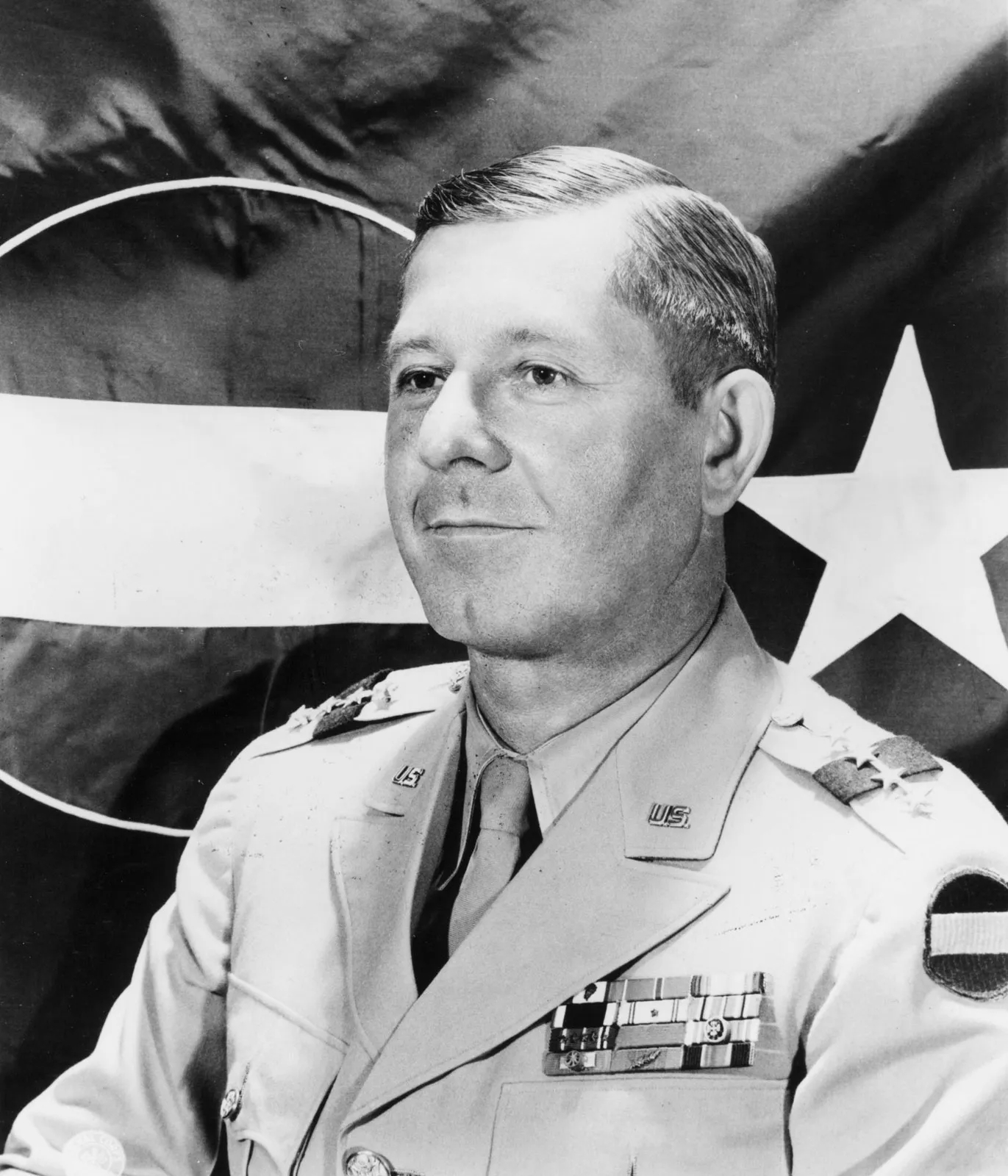
- Devers in 1945
- Born: 8 September 1887; York, Pennsylvania, United States
- Died: 15 October 1979 (aged 92); Washington, D.C., United States
- Burial place: Arlington National Cemetery
- Military career
- Allegiance: United States
- Branch: United States Army
- Service years: 1909–1949
- Rank: General
- Nicknames: "Jamie", "Jake"
- Service number: 0-2599
- Unit: Field Artillery Branch
- Commands: Army Field Forces Army Ground Forces; 6th Army Group; North African Theater of Operations, United States Army; European Theater of Operations, United States Army; Armored Force; 9th Infantry Division; 2nd Battalion, 6th Field Artillery; 1st Battalion, 16th Field Artillery; 1st Field Artillery
- Conflicts: World War I; World War II; Italian campaign; Battle of Monte Cassino; Operation Dragoon; Battle of the Bulge; Operation Nordwind; Colmar Pocket; Western Allied invasion of Germany; Operation Undertone
- Awards: Army Distinguished Service Medal (3); Navy Distinguished Service Medal; Bronze Star Medal; Full list
- Other work: Business executive Chairman, American Battle Monuments Commission

Jacob Loucks Devers (/ˈdɛvərz/; 8 September 1887 – 15 October 1979) was a United States Army general who commanded the 6th Army Group in the European Theater of World War II. He was involved in the development and adoption of numerous weapons, including the M4 Sherman and M26 Pershing tanks, the DUKW amphibious truck, the Bell H-13 Sioux helicopter, and the M16 rifle.

A graduate of the United States Military Academy, Devers was commissioned in the field artillery in 1909. During World War I, he was an instructor at the School of Fire at Fort Sill, Oklahoma, and the November 11 armistice ended the fighting before he received orders to go to France. He traveled to France soon afterwards, where he attended the French artillery school at Treves. Between the world wars, he was a staunch advocate of mechanization when the idea of phasing out horses met strong resistance from conservative gunners.

When World War II broke out in Europe, Devers was stationed in Panama. He was promoted to major general in October 1940 and took command of the newly formed 9th Infantry Division at Fort Bragg, North Carolina, a base whose construction he oversaw. Appointed Chief of the Armored Force in August 1941, he supervised its expansion from four armored divisions to sixteen. He was an articulate proponent of the emerging tactical doctrine of combined arms and rejected the American doctrine that held that tanks were for exploitation, not for fighting other tanks. He pressed American industry to produce more powerful engines and, often against the views of his superiors, pushed the development of the M4 Sherman, a medium tank with a 75 mm gun. Not satisfied with the Sherman, he called for still more heavily armed and -armored tanks. He wanted 250 of the new M26 Pershing tanks for Operation Overlord but was overruled.

In May 1943, Devers became European Theater of Operations, United States Army (ETOUSA) commander. His principal tasks were overseeing preparation of detailed plans and the buildup of men and materiel for Overlord, and supporting the Combined Bomber Offensive. He clashed with General Dwight D. Eisenhower over the diversion of ETOUSA resources to Eisenhower's North African Theater of Operations. Eisenhower succeeded him at ETOUSA in January 1944, and Devers went to the Mediterranean as Commander North African Theater of Operations, United States Army (NATOUSA), and Deputy Supreme Allied Commander, Mediterranean Theater, to British General Sir Henry Maitland Wilson. Devers was involved in the organization, planning and leadership of Operation Dragoon, the invasion of southern France in August 1944. He led the 6th Army Group in France and Germany through the advance to the Rhine, the German counterattack in Operation Northwind, the operations to reduce the Colmar Pocket and the Western Allied invasion of Germany. After the war, he commanded the Army Ground Forces.

== Early life and education ==
Jacob Loucks Devers was born in York, Pennsylvania, on 8 September 1887. His parents were Philip Devers, a watchmaker and partner in a jewelry store, and Ella Kate Loucks, a homemaker. He had two younger brothers, Frank and Phillip, and a younger sister, Catherine, known as Kitts. The Devers, of Irish and Alsatian ancestry, were strict, hardworking, and religious. The family belonged to the Evangelical Lutheran Church, which did not believe in smoking or drinking. While providing a comfortable middle-class life for their children, the couple taught them to value dependability, integrity, and industriousness.

Growing up in the heart of Pennsylvania Dutch country, the young Jamie Devers, as he was called by his family, enjoyed the outdoors: camping, fishing, and hunting. He played all the usual boyhood sports and made friends easily with his engaging smile and cheerful personality. In addition to his household chores, he did odd jobs around the neighborhood and worked on the farm of his maternal grandfather, Jacob Loucks. Initially, he was educated at Garfield Elementary School in York. He entered York High School in September 1901. A popular student, he was elected class president. He had an excellent academic record and earned high marks in mathematics and science. Always competitive despite being slightly built, the 120-pound (54 kg) 5-foot-10-inch (178 cm) Devers captained the basketball team, played defensive quarterback in football, and starred in baseball.

Devers graduated from York High School in May 1905. He was accepted to Lehigh University, where he intended to study engineering, but U.S. Representative Daniel F. Lafean offered him an appointment to the U.S. Military Academy at West Point. He entered in June with the class of 1909. Among his classmates were George S. Patton, William Hood Simpson, and Robert L. Eichelberger, who would also become four-star generals in World War II, and John C. H. Lee, who became a three-star general. Devers's classmates considered him a "puritanical" man with "a countercultural aversion to alcohol and tobacco". He did well in his studies and excelled in sports by playing shortstop on the Army baseball team and guard on the Army Black Knights' basketball squad. He also played polo. He graduated from West Point on 11 June 1909, ranking 39th in his class of 103, and was commissioned as a second lieutenant in his chosen branch, the field artillery. There were only nine positions available, but enough of the higher-ranking cadets chose other branches that Devers secured his first preference.

== World War I ==
Devers's first posting was the 1st Battalion, 4th Mountain Artillery, based at Vancouver Barracks, Washington. That was a pack artillery unit, with its howitzers, ammunition, and equipment carried by mules. It was equipped with the obsolescent QF 2.95-inch mountain gun. Three months after Devers joined, the unit moved to Fort David A. Russell, Wyoming, where it rejoined the 2nd Battalion, which was returning from the Philippines. Devers was assigned to Battery C. Soon afterwards, First Lieutenant Lesley J. McNair became the battery commander. On 11 October 1911, Devers married Georgie Hayes Lyon of Arlington, Virginia, daughter of Frank Lyon and niece of Major LeRoy S. Lyon, his battalion commander, in a ceremony at her parents' home in Arlington, Virginia. They had met when she visited her uncle at Fort Russell.

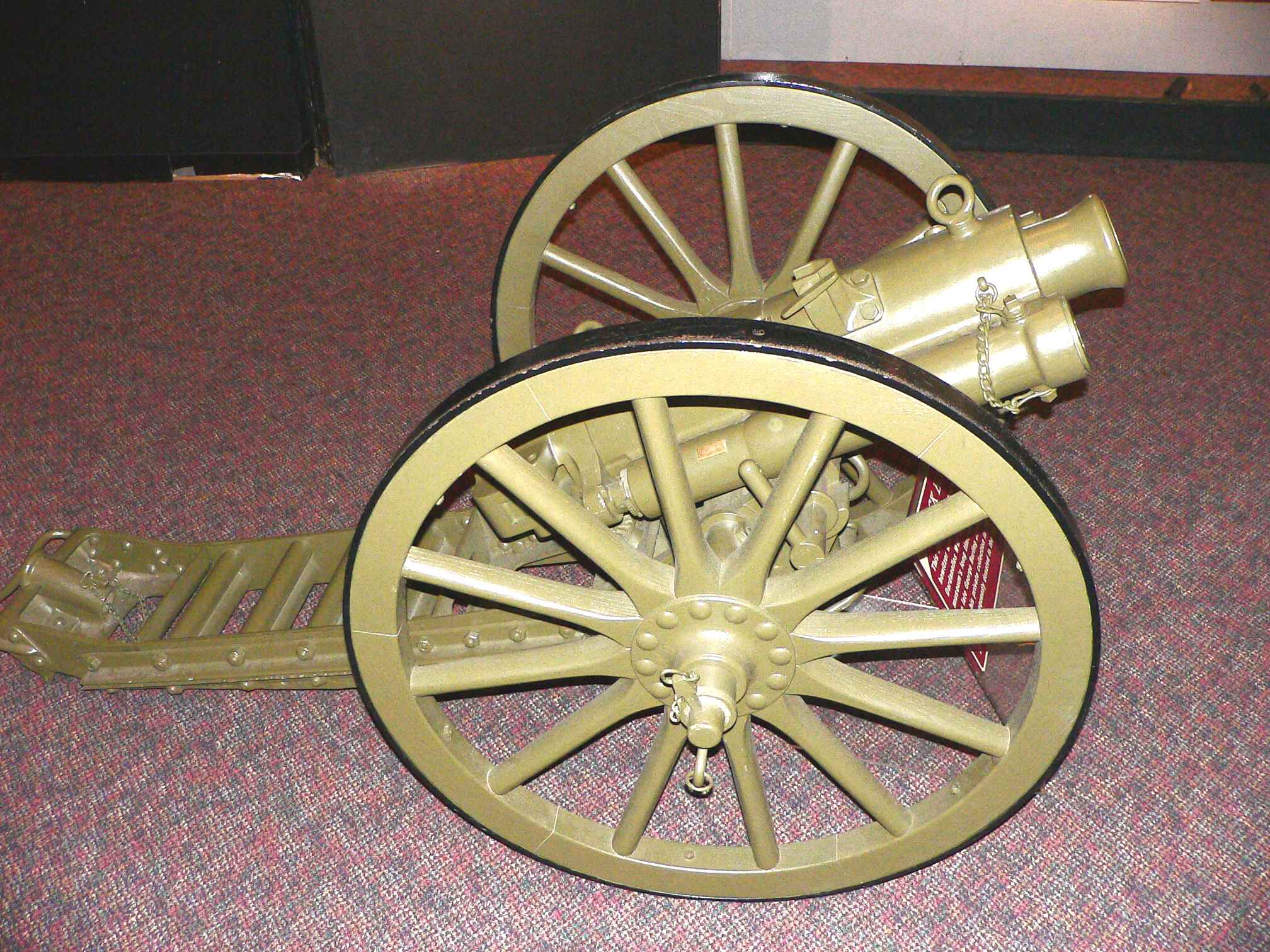
A QF 2.95-inch mountain gun

For his next assignment in December 1912, Devers was sent back to West Point to teach mathematics. He also managed the baseball program and coached the Cadet basketball team. His players included Dwight D. Eisenhower and Omar Bradley. On 1 April 1916, he was promoted to first lieutenant. That August, he was transferred to the newly activated 9th Field Artillery at Schofield Barracks, in what was then the Territory of Hawaii. His only child Frances Lyon, was born there on 20 July 1917. The 9th Field Artillery had a battalion of 4.7-inch guns and one of 155 mm guns. Medium artillery was new in the United States Army, and the 9th was its first artillery tractor-drawn regiment. Devers was given command of Battery F.

The United States entered World War I against Germany on 6 April 1917. Devers was promoted to captain on 15 May and major on 5 August. He was posted to the School of Fire at Fort Sill, Oklahoma, on 10 December as an instructor. He received promotions to lieutenant colonel on 30 July 1918 and colonel on 24 October 1918. He became executive officer of the 9th Field Artillery Regiment, his former unit from Hawaii now at Fort Sill, on 15 October 1918. In September, he was nominated to command the 60th Field Artillery, which was ordered to move to the Western Front in France, but he never took up the post. The Armistice of 11 November 1918 ended the fighting, and the orders were canceled. A disappointed Devers instead became commanding officer of the 1st Field Artillery at Fort Sill on 5 March 1919.

In May 1919, Devers was sent on a three-month temporary duty assignment to Europe with the American Army of Occupation. He attended the French artillery school at Trèves to study guns, ammunition, equipment, and tactics used by the Allies and the Germans during the war.

== Interwar Period ==
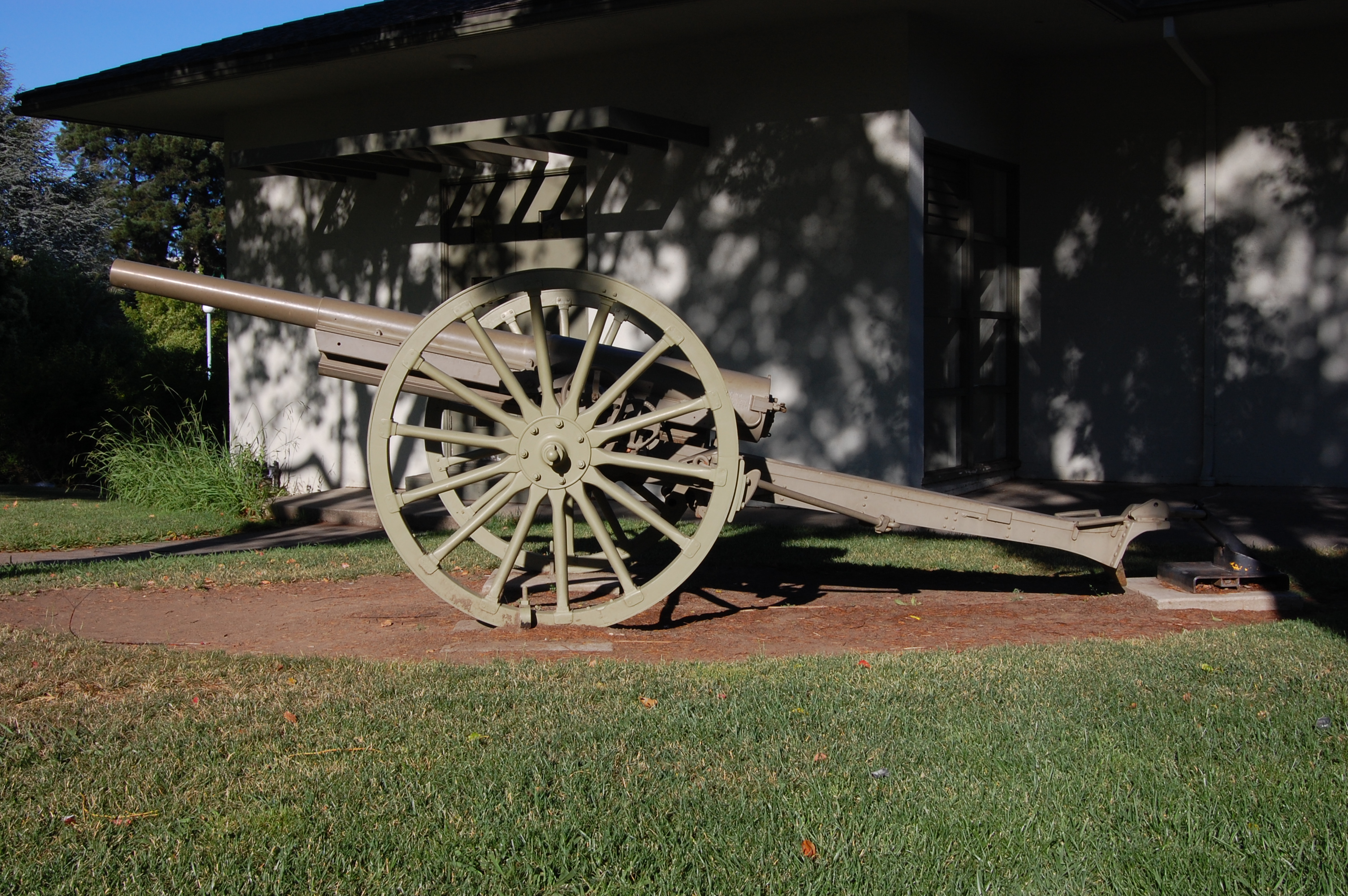
A 75 mm gun

Returning to the United States, Devers began a second tour of duty at West Point by serving as Senior Field Artillery Instructor and Commander, Field Artillery Detachment. He reverted from colonel to his substantive rank of captain on taking up the appointment on 20 August 1919. He was promoted to major again on 1 July 1920. The superintendent was Brigadier General Douglas MacArthur. MacArthur fought an uphill and unpopular battle to bring the curriculum up to date, and Devers defended MacArthur and his methods although his own department was unaffected.

After five years at West Point, Devers was selected to attend the Command and General Staff School at Fort Leavenworth, Kansas. He began his studies there on 3 September 1924 and finished as a Distinguished Graduate on 28 June 1925. He was ranked 42nd in the class of 258. He was then posted once again to Fort Sill, this time as the director the Field Artillery School's Gunnery Department until 31 August 1929. He worked with officers such as Captain Edward H. Brooks. During his tour, Devers was credited with making a number of innovative artillery tactical and technical improvements, including advanced fire-support techniques, which was later used successfully during World War II. He remained a staunch advocate of mechanization throughout the interwar period. The idea of phasing out horses met strong resistance from conservative gunners.

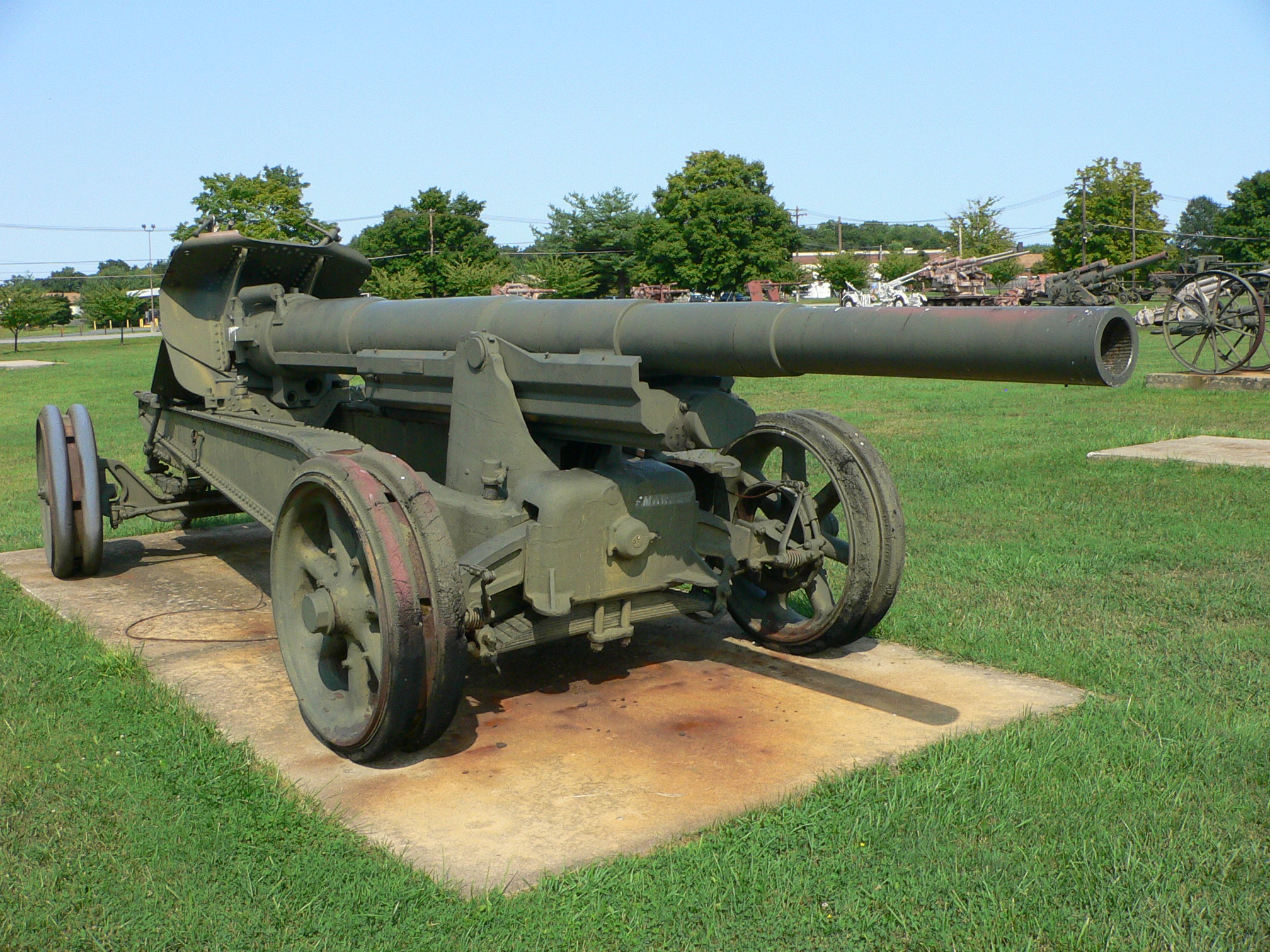
A 155 mm gun

In September 1929, Devers was ordered to Washington, DC, to serve on the staff of the Chief of Field Artillery. Chosen to attend the Army War College in Washington, he began his studies there on 15 August 1932 and graduated on 29 June 1933. That was followed by a one-year assignment to Fort Hoyle, Maryland, as executive officer of the 1st Field Artillery Brigade, and then as commander of the 2nd Battalion, 6th Field Artillery. After 14 years as a major, he was promoted to lieutenant colonel again on 26 February 1934. On 15 June, he was sent to Fort Myer, Virginia, near the District of Columbia, as commander of the 1st Battalion, 16th Field Artillery. The battalion was supposed to be a demonstration unit for parades and other public events, and was short of personnel because many were assigned to duty with the Civilian Conservation Corps. As a result, young regimental officers like Second Lieutenant Alexander Graham, who later married Devers's daughter Frances, were surprised when Devers had them conduct training in the field and fire their 75 mm guns at every opportunity.

In 1936, Devers returned to the Military Academy for the third time, now as graduate manager of athletics. The superintendent was now Major General William Durward Connor, an officer renowned for his sharp tongue. Devers later recalled, "A lot of people were afraid of General Connor. He called me a moron once a week". The responsibility had grown considerably since the days when Devers was a cadet. Then, there were only six varsity team sports; by 1936, there were eighteen. Despite the Great Depression, the Athletic Boards, which Devers ran, had accumulated considerable funds. His major task was the construction of new playing fields where there did not appear to be any available land. He came up with a plan to move the right of way of the West Shore Railroad. He found the railroad welcoming of the plan, as a shorter and straighter route saved them money. The new fields were completed in December 1936. He was promoted to full colonel on 1 July 1938.

== World War II ==
=== Emergency ===
In August 1939, Devers and his wife, Georgie, boarded the Army transport Leonard Wood, bound for the Panama Canal Zone. There was at the time a genuine fear that a hostile nation might strike at the United States with an attack on the Panama Canal and prevent the movement of ships between the Pacific and the Atlantic. The outbreak of World War II in Europe in September 1939 led to an escalation of fears. Reinforcements including the 5th and 13th Infantry were sent to Panama. Devers became Chief of Staff to Major General David L. Stone, and then to Daniel Van Voorhis, who replaced Stone in December. He supervised construction projects and other improvements to the Panama Canal Zone defenses.

On the recommendation of the new Chief of Staff of the Army, General George C. Marshall, and with the approval of Secretary of War Henry H. Woodring, Devers was promoted over 474 other colonels to brigadier general on 1 May 1940, becoming, at age 52, the youngest brigadier general in the army. In July he was recalled to Washington from the Panama Canal Zone to assume command of the Provisional Brigade in the District of Columbia area. In September, Marshall, with the approval of new Secretary of War Henry L. Stimson, named Devers Senior U.S. Army representative to the Presidential Board tasked with surveying bases in the Caribbean and Newfoundland to be leased from the British under the Destroyers for Bases Agreement. When Devers said that he could use an Air Corps officer, Lieutenant Colonel Townsend E. Griffiss, who was assigned as an Air Corps liaison in the Military Intelligence Division (G-2), happened to be outside Marshall's office; Marshall told Devers to take Griffiss.

Devers was promoted to major general on 1 October 1940 and was sent to command the newly formed 9th Infantry Division at Fort Bragg, North Carolina, to succeed Brigadier General Francis W. Honeycutt, who had been killed in an air crash. Devers supervised training of the 9th and managed Bragg's huge base expansion program. Devers directed basic and advanced infantry training at Bragg for the thousands of troops under his command: regular army, national guard, reservists, and draftees. Among his colonels was Alexander M. (Sandy) Patch, the commander of the 47th Infantry. During Devers's tour, Fort Bragg's strength grew from 5,400 to 67,000 soldiers. Meanwhile, he pushed forward immense construction projects for base housing, training facilities and roads on the overcrowded post. By working closely and co-operatively with engineers, local contractors, quartermasters and staff and by cutting through red tape, Devers oversaw completion of 2,500 buildings and 93 miles (150 km) of roads in six months.

=== Armored Force ===
On 1 August 1941, General Marshall named Devers Chief of the Armored Force, headquartered at Fort Knox, Kentucky, replacing the terminally-ill Major General Adna R. Chaffee Jr. Devers reported directly to Marshall. He was responsible for inspecting, organizing and training the army's armored divisions and separate non-divisional tank battalions, including all non-tank personnel assigned. McNair's Army General Headquarters (GHQ) was in tactical charge of all U.S. ground forces, but GHQ specifically did not control the semi-autonomous Armored Force, which was considered a "quasi-arm". The Armored Force had complete control of its own training, doctrine, and organization. In a major reorganization of the War Department in March 1942, McNair was named Commander of a new component, Army Ground Forces (AGF), which replaced GHQ. Relations between GHQ/AGF and the Armored Force were distant, and lines of authority and responsibility were often unclear. McNair seemed to prefer leaving Devers alone.

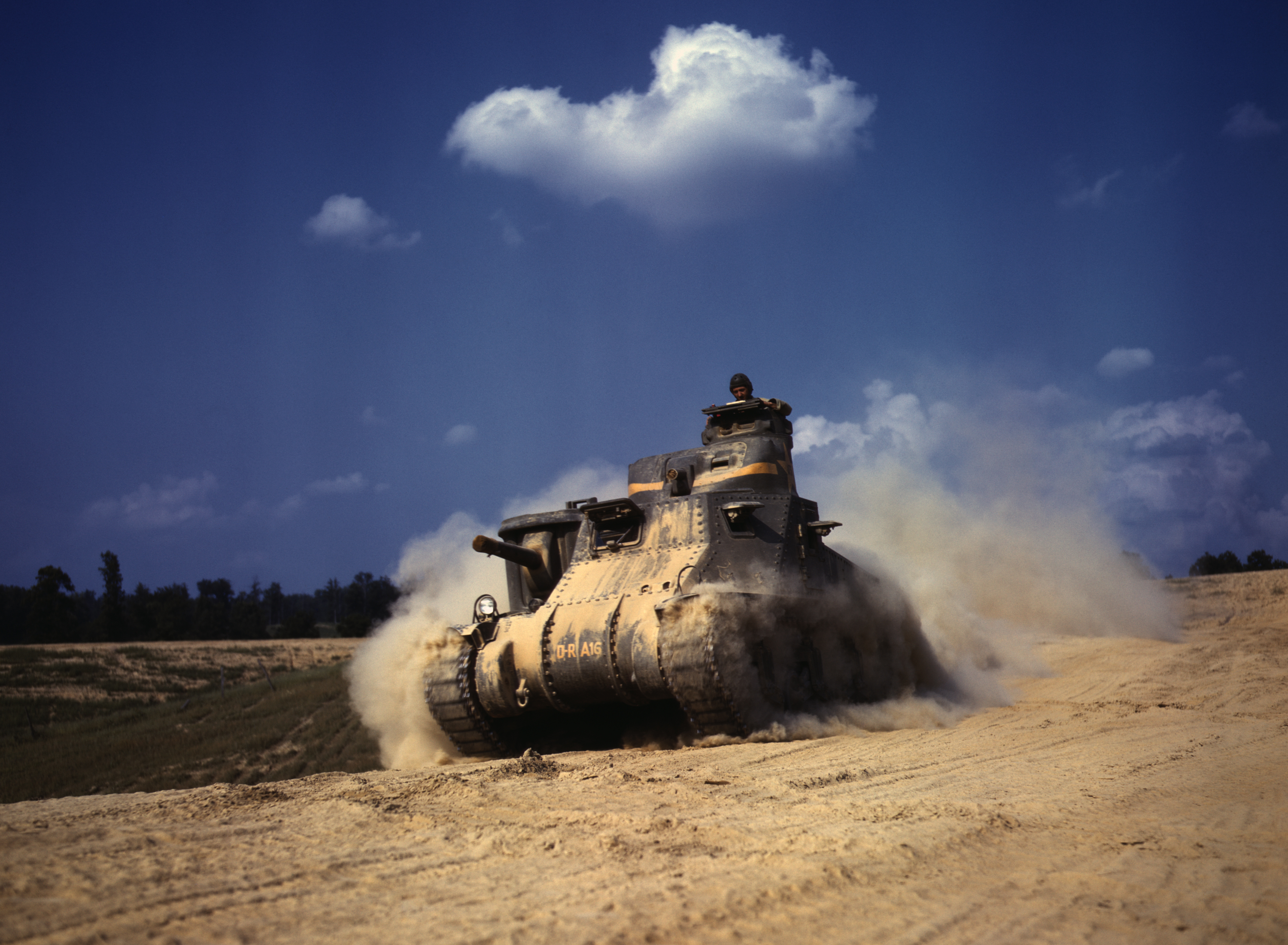
An M3 Lee tank at Fort Knox

When Devers took command, the Armored Force had two operational armored divisions: the 1st Armored Division at Fort Polk (now Fort Johnson), Louisiana, and the 2nd Armored Division at Fort Knox, as well as one independent tank battalion, the 70th Tank Battalion at Fort George G. Meade, Maryland. Both divisions participated in the large-scale war games of the Louisiana Maneuvers in August and September 1941 and the Carolina Maneuvers in November 1941. Despite some successes, the maneuvers revealed armored unit and equipment operational deficiencies, as well as a general lack of combat readiness. Devers attributed much of the poor performance to poorly trained junior and staff officers but also saw doctrinal deficiencies, which hampered the co-ordination of tanks, the infantry, and the artillery.

In particular, post-maneuver reports emphasized the vulnerability of tanks to antitank fire. That bolstered the antitank gun, which were strongly supported by McNair. Devers differed by countering that the number of tank "kills" credited to antitank gunners was unrealistic and biased and felt that "we were licked by a set of umpires' rules". McNair continued to push for an independent tank destroyer force, but Devers argued that "the weapon to best the tank is a better tank". Nevertheless, in November, Marshall authorized creation of a tank destroyer force. The Tank Destroyer Center was created, and the War Department ordered the activation of 53 tank destroyer battalions. Battlefield experience proved that Devers was correct. In combat, most tanks were knocked out by other tanks, and tank destroyers were mainly used as mobile artillery support. The tank destroyer program was scaled back, and tank destroyer battalions were deactivated. At the end of the war, the tank destroyer quasi-arm was disbanded.

Before Devers's arrival, Armored Force doctrine emphasized light tanks weighing no more than 15 short tons (14 t). American doctrine held that tanks were for exploitation, not fighting other tanks. He rejected the M6 heavy tank and recommended to McNair for it to be canceled, citing concerns about its weight, mobility, and reliability, which was seen as support for that position, but Devers wanted a medium tank, preferably by mounting something like a 105 mm howitzer. He was appalled to find that the Armored Force's tanks were armed with nothing heavier than a 37 mm gun. A new medium tank had started to come off the production line, the M3 Lee. Devers observed testing of one of them just days after taking command, and he was unimpressed. American industry was unable to cast a turret large enough to hold a 75 mm gun and so the M3 carried a 37 mm gun, with a 75 mm in a sponson. That gave it a limited traverse and made it difficult to engage moving targets. To make matters worse, the designers shortened the barrel to improve the M3's mobility, which Devers realized also reduced the gun's muzzle velocity and hence its effectiveness against armor. In practice, M3 crews attempted to engage German armor with the 75 mm, as the 37 mm was ineffective against it. It was found that the 75 mm could penetrate the frontal armor of German tanks at 400 yards (370 m), but German tanks destroyed M3s at up to 1,100 yards (1,000 m). Devers pronounced the M3 "overweight, underpowered, and insufficiently armed".

Often against the views of his superiors, Devers lobbied for a still more heavily armored and better-armed medium tank, the M4 Sherman. He played an important role in the M4's design, development and manufacturing, particularly its engine and armament. Throughout his tour as Chief of the Armored Force, he worked closely with the United States Army Ordnance Department, manufacturers and the Armored Force Board at Fort Knox on the research and testing of tanks, guns, armored vehicles and ammunition. The biggest obstacle was engines. Those of prewar tanks were rated at 250 horsepower (190 kW), insufficient for a 35 short tons (32 t) medium tank. Devers wanted an 800 horsepower (600 kW) engine, but that was beyond the ability of the American automotive industry to produce. Extraordinary efforts resulted in the development of a number of 400 horsepower (300 kW) engines. He controversially rejected the General Motors 6046 diesel engine in favor of a gasoline engine. Battlefield experience demonstrated that the diesel engine was superior. The quest for a better engine eventually settled on the Ford GAA engine, but there was a persistent shortage of tank engines. Some 49,234 of the reliable, versatile, low-cost M4 Sherman and its variants were produced.

After the GHQ Maneuvers, the Army expected to have a period of "remedial training" to fix problems. The Japanese attack on Pearl Harbor on 7 December 1941 shattered those expectations and plunged a not fully prepared United States into the war. In early 1942, two armored divisions were operational and three were in training: the 6th Armored Division was activated in February, followed by the 7th Armored Division in March. McNair recommended for one division in five to be an armored division, which meant up to 50 armored divisions by the end of 1943. Pressure increased on Devers, who was promoted to lieutenant general (equal in rank to McNair) on 6 September 1942, to push more armored units through the pipeline even more quickly. Training was sometimes neglected because of the pressing need to get units ready for overseas deployment. Initially, the Armored Force trained all of the components of the armored division, but after March 1942, it became restricted to tank personnel, with other personnel coming from their own branch training centers. Devers sent Patton, now commander of I Armored Corps, to set up the Desert Training Center (DTC) in the California-Arizona Mojave Desert, where soldiers could train for desert warfare. When it closed in 1944, 20 infantry and armored divisions had trained there; although none fought in the desert, and five of them were sent to the Pacific.

Devers was an articulate proponent of the Army's now-emerging tactical doctrine of combined arms: infantry-artillery-armor-close air support. He carried a translation of a German manual on the components of the Panzer division. Devers was neither the first nor the only general to embrace combined arms as the doctrinal solution to the problem of how best to employ tanks, but he was well-placed to act upon it. At his direction, an updated comprehensive (460 pages) Armed Force Field Manual: Tactics and Technique FM 17–10 was written, published, and distributed in March 1942. A German manual on tank platoon tactics, with a foreword by Heinz Guderian, was translated into English and issued as an Armored Force publication.

March 1942 saw a reorganization of the armored divisions in the wake of the 1941 maneuvers. Devers added an artillery headquarters to the armored division and reorganized the artillery component into three battalions, each of three batteries of six M7 Priest self-propelled guns. A division trains headquarters was added to coordinate logistical activities. In a first, at Devers's insistence, a flight of light aircraft to be used for artillery spotting and reconnaissance were included in the new Table of Organization and Equipment (TO&E) for each division. He was a strong and early supporter of the development of the DUKW, an amphibious truck. Vannevar Bush later recalled that in the early stages of its development, Devers was the only man in the Army who fully appreciated its possibilities. Its value was demonstrated during the Allied invasion of Sicily in July 1943.

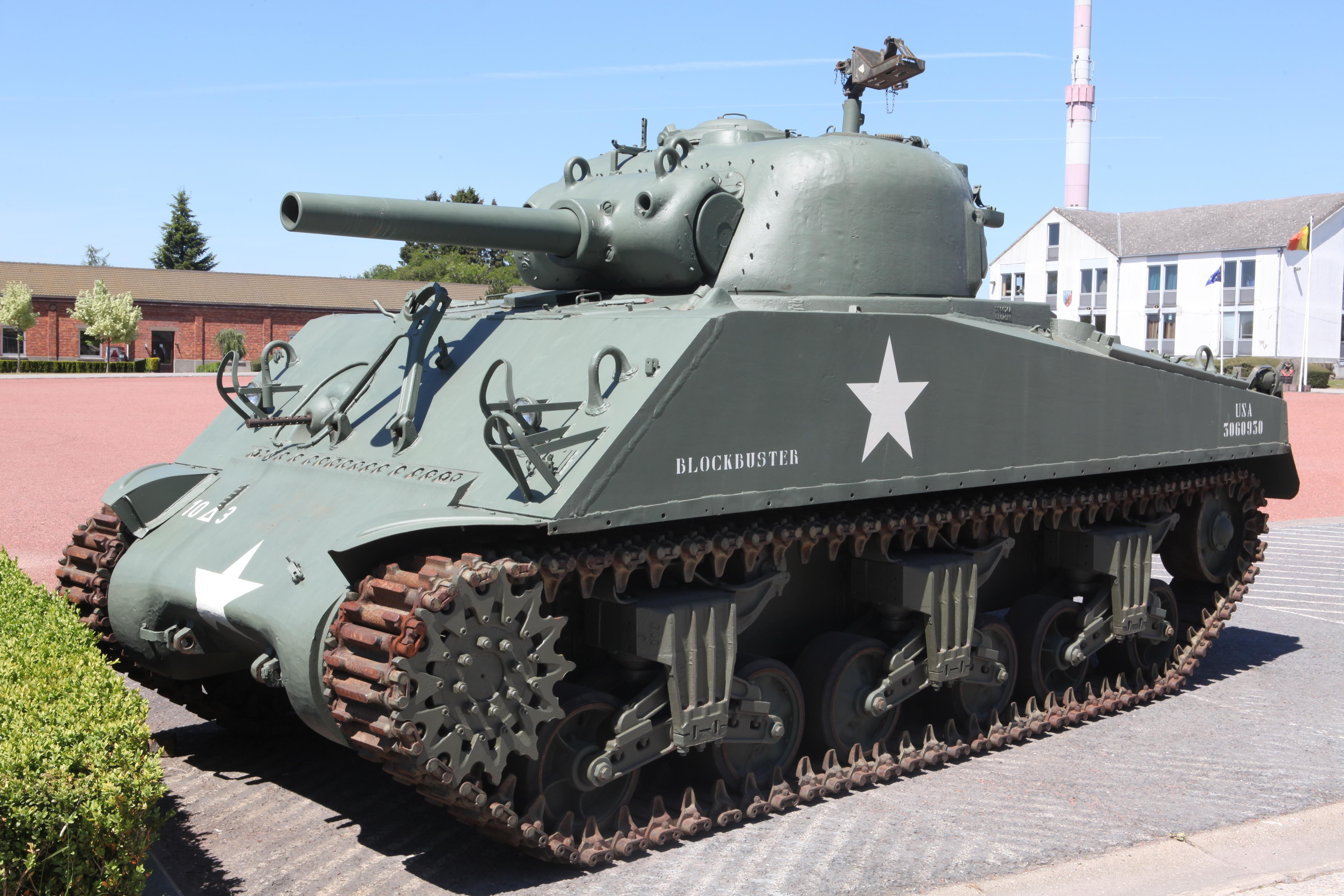
An M4 Sherman tank

From 14 December 1942 to 28 January 1943, Devers went on an inspection tour of the battlefields in North Africa, along with Major General Edward H. Brooks and Brigadier General Williston B. Palmer from the Armored Force, and Gladeon M. Barnes from the Ordnance Department. He spoke with key British generals, including Harold Alexander, Bernard Montgomery, and Richard McCreery, and U.S. commanders including Eisenhower, Patton, Thomas B. Larkin and Orlando Ward, and received a great deal of feedback about American equipment. Eisenhower was defensive since he was suspicious that Marshall may have sent Devers to replace him and was nervous when Devers had critical comments about the handling of the 1st Armored Division. Devers noted that the M4 Sherman was superior to the M3 Lee with which the 1st Armored Division was equipped, but he urged the development of the more powerful 76 mm gun.

The intelligence that was gathered was nearly lost when their B-17 lost its way returning to England and crashlanded in Athenry, Republic of Ireland. Fortunately, nobody was injured, and the entire group, with the critical intelligence, made their way by train to Northern Ireland early the following morning.

In 1943, McNair took an axe to the armored division organization and dramatically downsized it. For all but the 2nd and 3rd Armored Divisions, the number of armored battalions was reduced to three. Devers favored the older larger organization. The surplus armored battalions were utilized as separate armored battalions and so by the end of 1943, there were 54 armored battalions in armored divisions and 65 non-divisional battalions. By then, the planned number of Army Ground Force divisions had been dramatically cut to 90, and McNair considered that only ten armored divisions were required and suggested for six of the sixteen armored divisions already active to be broken up. His proposal was not accepted, and the number of armored divisions was frozen at sixteen.

=== European Theater of Operations, United States Army (ETOUSA) ===
On 3 May 1943, while on an aerial inspection tour, Lieutenant General Frank M. Andrews, European Theater of Operations, United States Army (ETOUSA) commander since replacing Eisenhower on 5 February 1943, was killed in an air crash in Iceland. Marshall appointed Devers to replace Andrews. Devers arrived in England on 9 May 1943. His principal tasks were overseeing preparation of detailed plans and the buildup of men and materiel for Operation Overlord and supporting the Combined Bomber Offensive. At the end of May 1943, there were 133,000 US troops in the United Kingdom, of which 19,000 were in the ground forces, 74,000 in the air forces, and 34,000 in the services of supply. By the end of the year, their numbers had grown to 774,000, of which 265,000 were in the ground forces, 286,000 in the air forces, and 220,000 in the services of supply. In preparing the plans for Overlord, he worked closely with the Chief of Staff to the Supreme Allied Commander (COSSAC), British Lieutenant General Frederick E. Morgan with whom he had a good working relationship. Devers's main objection to the COSSAC plan was that he did not want American units smaller than corps directly subordinated to British command, based on what he called "the Pershing Principl".

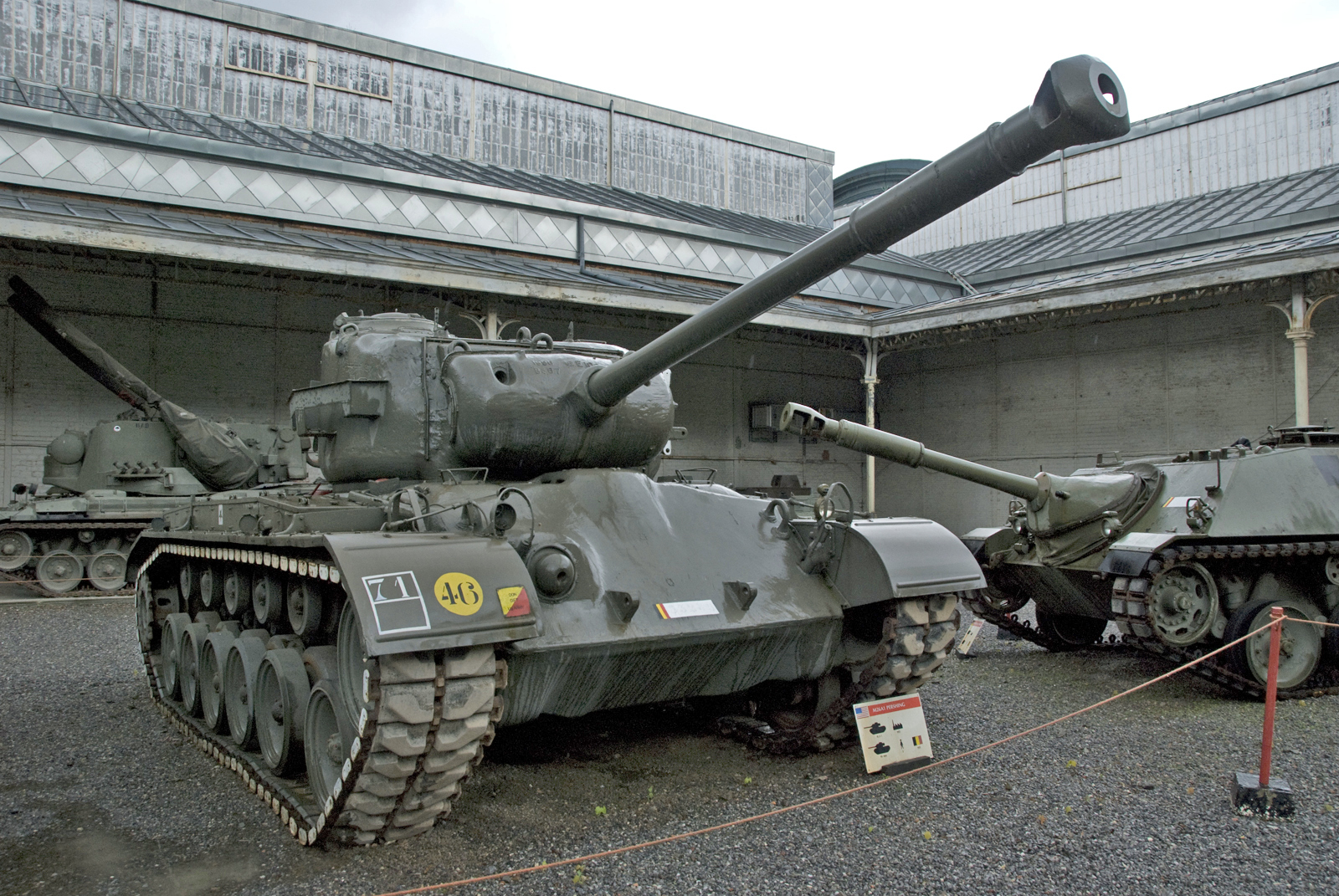
An M26 Pershing tank

Devers clashed with Eisenhower over the diversion of ETOUSA resources to Eisenhower's North African Theater of Operations. On 28 July 1943, Eisenhower and Lieutenant General Carl Spaatz asked that four groups of Boeing B-17 Flying Fortress bombers be sent to the North African Theater to help support Operation Avalanche, the Allied invasion of Italy. The planned assault area at Salerno was at the extreme range of Allied fighters based in Sicily, and long-range bombers were needed to isolate the battlefield. Eisenhower and Spaatz felt that their theater should have priority. However, the four groups represented about a third of the Eighth Air Force's heavy bombers, and their departure would greatly impact the Combined Bomber Offensive, so Devers turned down the request. Devers and Eighth Air Force's commander, Major General Ira C. Eaker, spoke to the British Chiefs of Staff Committee, who agreed with them. When Eisenhower appealed to Washington, Marshall and General Henry H. Arnold, the Chief of Army Air Forces, also supported Devers. In August, Eisenhower asked for permission to retain three groups of Consolidated B-24 Liberator bombers in the North African Theater. Devers again turned down his request, and Marshall and Arnold again supported him. In September, however, when Avalanche came under severe pressure from German counterattacks, Devers readily acceded to a request for the return of the three groups. Stephen Ambrose later noted, "Eisenhower was not accustomed to having his requests to Marshall turned down and found it difficult to accept".

In September 1943, AGF representatives met with Devers to discuss his needs, and he asked for 250 of the new T26E1 tanks, later redesignated the M26 Pershing, to be produced and shipped as a matter of urgency. The Ordnance Department concurred, but added on 1,000 T23 series tanks, an advanced design handicapped by problems with the reliability of its electric transmission. McNair rejected the request, writing that "the M4 tank, particularly the M4A3, has been widely hailed as the best tank on the battlefield today.... Other than this particular request, which represents the British view—there has been no call from any theater for a 90mm tank gun. There appears to be no fear on the part of our forces of the German Mark VI (Tiger) tank... there can be no basis for the T26 tank other than the conception of a tank versus tank duel—which is believed unsound and unnecessary.... there is no indication that the 76mm antitank gun is inadequate against the Mark VI (Tiger) tank".

=== North African Theater of Operations, United States Army (NATOUSA) ===
At the Tehran Conference in November 1943, President Roosevelt named Eisenhower as the Supreme Allied Commander for Overlord. Devers hoped that he would be appointed commander of the First Army Group, but he was instead sent to the Mediterranean as Commander North African Theater of Operations, United States Army (NATOUSA), which was primarily a logistical administrative organization. American formations in the theater included Lieutenant General Mark W. Clark's Fifth Army and George Patton's Seventh Army; the Twelfth Air Force, led by Major General John K. Cannon; the Fifteenth Air Force, commanded by Major General Nathan Twining; and the NATOUSA Services of Supply, headed by Major General Thomas B. Larkin. Eaker went with Devers as Commander in Chief of the Mediterranean Allied Air Forces. Devers, who arrived at Allied Force Headquarters (AFHQ) in Algiers on 4 January 1944, was also deputy to the Supreme Allied Commander, Mediterranean Theater, British General Sir Henry Maitland Wilson. Devers and Wilson worked well together, and despite the administrative nature of his position, Devers spent most of his time at the front. Wilson often had Devers deal with difficult cases like the French and the Poles, and Devers was later decorated by the Polish government-in-exile for allowing Poles who were captured in German uniform to join the Polish II Corps in Italy.

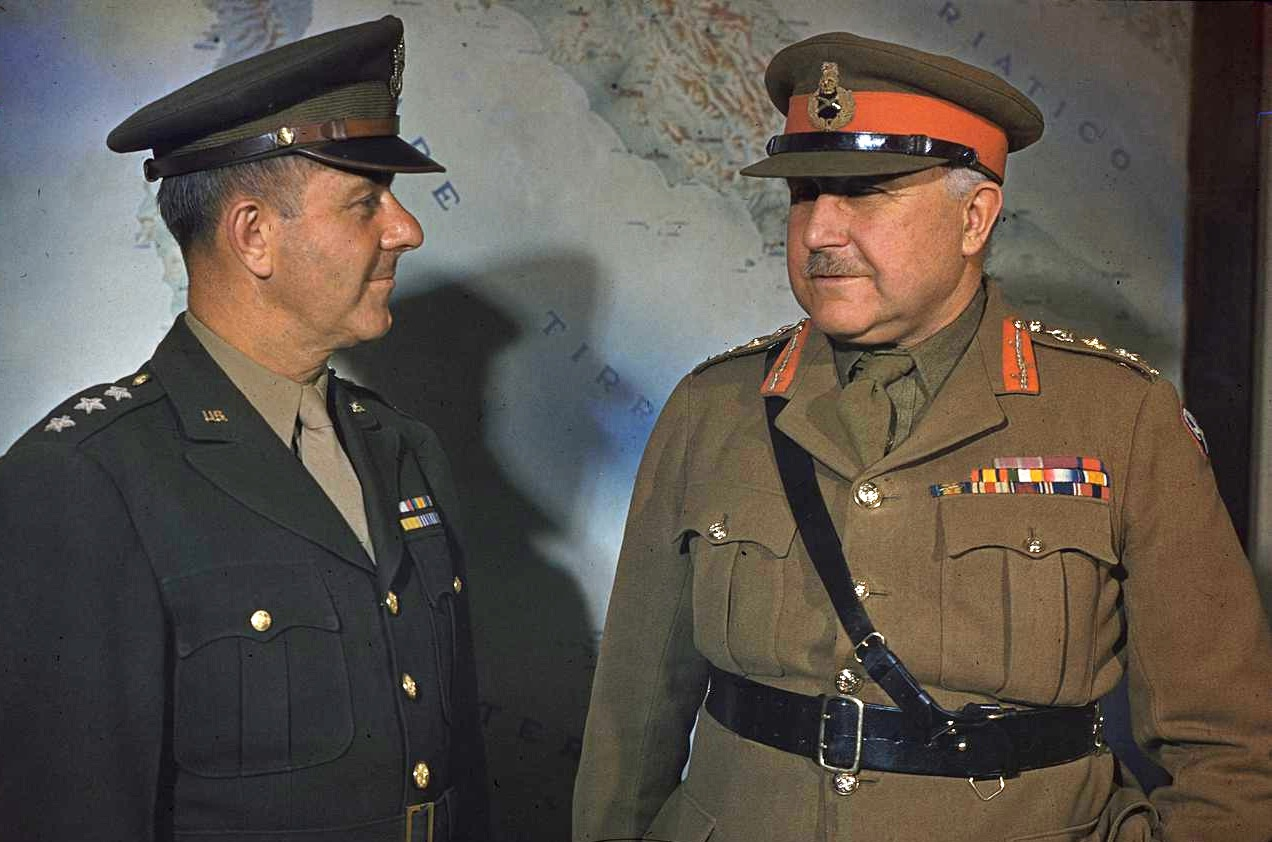
Devers (left) with British General Sir Henry Maitland Wilson

At the beginning of 1944, Allied Armies in Italy (AAI) fighting on the Italian Front were bogged down south of Rome in front of the German Gustav Line. The chain of strong defensive positions in mountainous terrain was anchored in the middle at Monte Cassino. Operation Shingle, Clark's plan for a surprise end run to outflank the German Winter Line called for Allied landings at Anzio on Italy's west coast, thirty miles south of Rome. On 7 January 1944, just days after he had become Wilson's deputy, Devers attended a conference in Marrakesh to discuss Shingle. In attendance was British Prime Minister Winston Churchill; General Wilson, General Sir Harold Alexander, Commander-in-Chief of the AAI; Admiral of the Fleet Sir Andrew Cunningham; and Major General Walter Bedell Smith. Devers wondered why such a high-level conference was required for what he saw as a simple military decision, but he noted in his diary that "the individuals present all favored an amphibious operation at Anzio".

Devers clashed with Smith over the latter's attempt to obtain officers for Eisenhower's command. He tried to be accommodating, and consented to release a number of officers, including Patton and Major General Everett Hughes, but declined to give up others, including Larkin, Brigadier General Clarence Adcock and in particular Major General Lucian Truscott, who was commanding the 3rd Infantry Division. Eisenhower wanted Truscott to command a corps in the assault in Operation Overlord. Devers foresaw him doing the same in southern France. Eisenhower appealed to Marshall, who supported him, but Devers protested that Truscott was about to lead the 3rd Infantry Division ashore at Anzio in a few days' time. Not wanting to deprive Devers of a key subordinate on the eve of battle, Marshall backed down. Soon after the landing, Devers flew to the beachhead to see Truscott but was dismayed to find that the advance had halted on Clark's orders. Major General John P. Lucas' VI Corps did not achieve the desired result at Anzio, and Clark's attempted crossing of the Rapido River was a disaster.

At Monte Cassino, the historic abbey overlooked Allied positions below. Ground commanders were sure the monastery was being used by the Germans as an observation post. Lieutenant-General Bernard C. Freyberg, commander of the New Zealand Corps, who was preparing for a new assault on the mountain, had repeatedly requested for the abbey to be bombed. Taking advantage of the German practice of not giving away their positions by firing on small planes, Devers and Eaker flew low over the monastery and saw what they believed to be a radio aerial and enemy soldiers moving in and out. Wilson reluctantly agreed to its bombing. On 15 February Devers watched waves of American bombers level the monastery with Alexander, Clark, Freyberg, and Eaker. However, follow-up attacks that day and over the next eight days, failed to take the position, much less break the Gustav Line. Devers visited Anzio on 16 February and agreed with Alexander that Lucas should be relieved. Clark did so on 22 February.

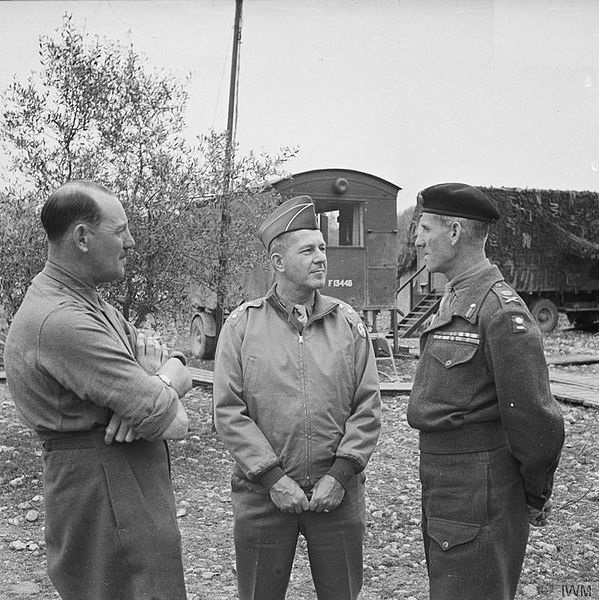
Lieutenant-General Sir Oliver W. H. Leese (left), commander of the British Eighth Army, with Devers and Lieutenant-General Sir Richard L. McCreery (right), commanding the British X Corps, at Eighth Army Tactical Headquarters

The continuing failure to advance in Italy prompted the Combined Chiefs of Staff to postpone Operation Anvil, the on-again-off-again proposal for Allied landings along the coast of Southern France coinciding with Overlord. Clark told Devers that another attack on the Gustav Line could not be mounted until May, and VI Corps could not be withdrawn from Anzio until it succeeded. However, planning continued for Anvil, which had begun in mid-January by AFHQ's Force 163 in Algiers. Initially, Clark was to lead the assault, with Lucas taking over Fifth Army. Devers did not have much faith in either of them, even before Lucas's relief. Lyman Lemnitzer later recalled that Fifth Army staff feared that Devers would relieve Clark every time both met.

Marshall insisted that Anvil required an experienced commander, and with Patton gone, Clark was the only one in the theater. Then, Devers received a cable that IV Corps headquarters was on its way to the theater. It was commanded by Major General Alexander Patch, who had a distinguished combat record by leading the soldiers and Marines of XIV Corps in the Guadalcanal campaign in the Pacific; before that, he had commanded the 47th Infantry Regiment of the 9th Division when Devers was commanding the division. With Marshall's concurrence, Devers appointed Patch to replace Patton as commander of the Seventh Army and Force 163 on 2 March. While Patch and his staff planned the operation, Devers ensured that the supplies that had been accumulated for it were not dissipated.

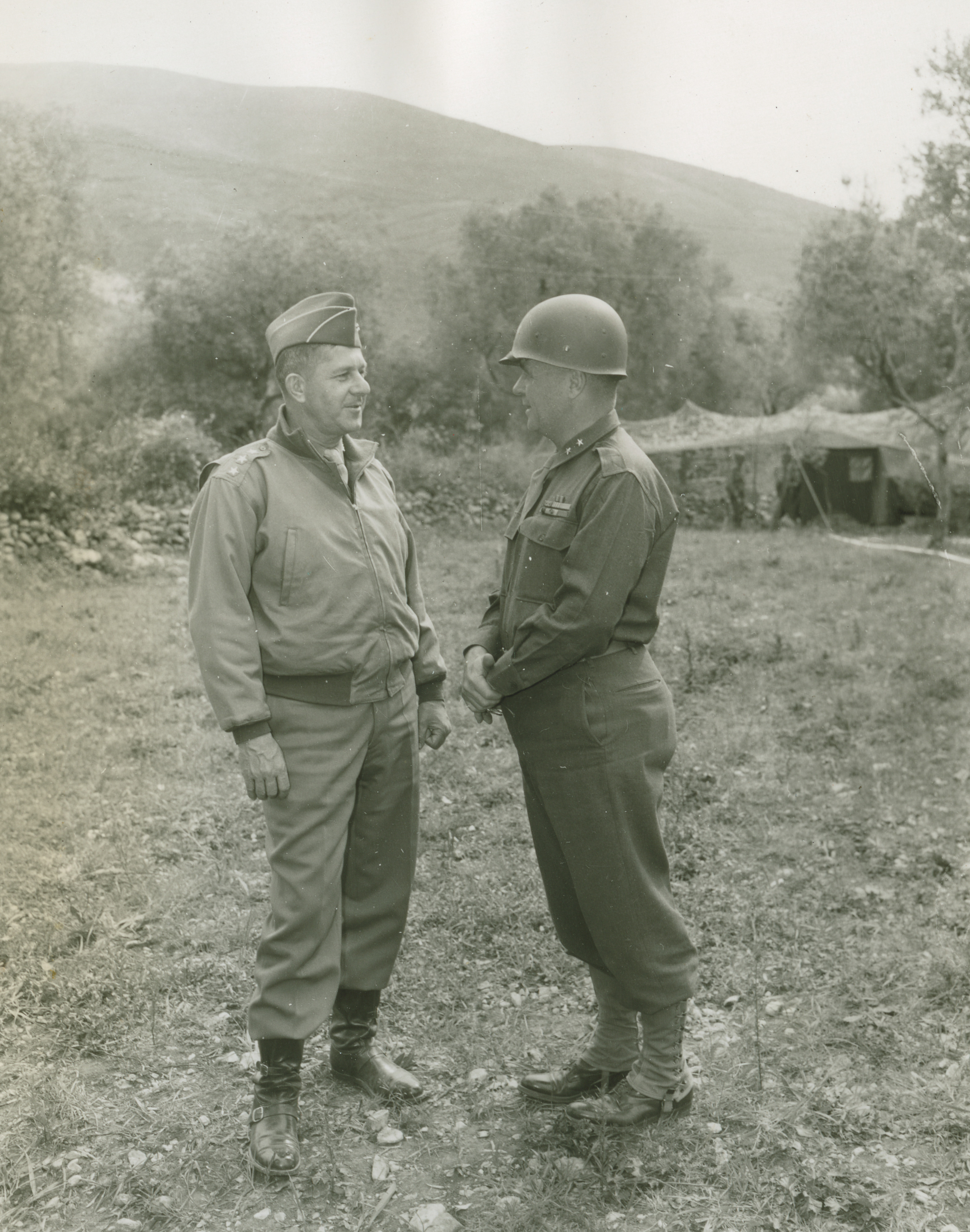
Lieutenant General Jacob L. Devers talks with Major General John B. Coulter outside a military camp in Italy, 29 May 1944.

A successful Allied offensive in May finally broke through the Gustav Line, and Rome fell to Clark's Fifth Army on 4 June. On 13 June, Devers ordered Larkin to shift priority for supplies from Fifth Army in Italy to Seventh Army. Two days later, Wilson ordered VI Corps to be withdrawn from the front line in preparation for Anvil. Virtually all of the material needed for the assault was on hand, on the way, or promised because of Devers's efforts to preserve the stockpile of Anvil stores and supplies even when the operation was in doubt. To command the assault, he created a special headquarters on Corsica called Advanced Detachment AFHQ, with Devers in command.

Devers sent a cable to Marshall on 1 July proposing for an army group to be formed, with himself as commander. Eisenhower concurred with this on 12 July. It would have been easy enough to add the Seventh Army to Bradley's 12th Army Group, but that would have meant that Eisenhower would have to deal with the French, and after his experience in Operation Torch, Eisenhower preferred to let Devers do so. Marshall made the appointment on 16 July. Thus, Devers wore four "hats" for the operation: Deputy Supreme Allied Commander, Mediterranean Theater; Commanding General NATOUSA; Commander, Advanced Detachment AFHQ, which was activated on 29 July; and Commanding General, 6th Army Group, which Devers activated on 1 August.

=== France and Germany 1944–1945 ===
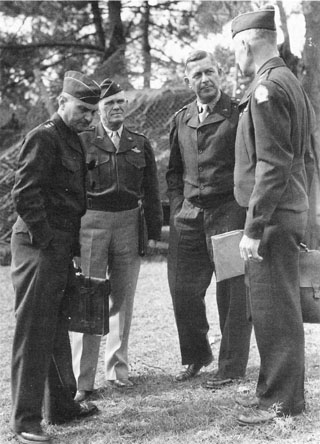
Anvil commanders (left to right): Lieutenant General Ira C. Eaker, Major General John K. Cannon, Devers, and Major General Thomas B. Larkin

Operation Dragoon was a crushing success. In a few short weeks, the French and American forces drove the Germans from southeastern France and captured major ports, including Marseille, on 28 August. On 15 September 1944, the 6th Army Group became operational and assumed control of Patch's Seventh Army and General Jean de Lattre de Tassigny's French First Army, as it became on 19 September. The French First Army was the largest French force that was ever amassed under a foreign military leader. Eisenhower's SHAEF assumed operational control of the 6th Army Group although Devers retained his own logistical system via the Mediterranean. The campaign was not without cost, and concurrent combat in Normandy and in Italy created a shortage of replacements, especially infantry, which left VI Corps about 5,200 men short.

Devers remained in command of NATOUSA and so he sent Clark a message on 19 October suggesting for units to be rested to keep casualties down. Devers had written to McNair on 4 February 1944 and noted that when divisions were left in the line for more than 30 to 40 days, fatigue, carelessness, and exposure resulted in increased casualty and sickness rates. Clark replied that "your radio indicates a lack of appreciation of our tactical situation, the terrain, enemy resistance, and my mission". Devers noted in his diary that Clark's response "shows quite well his lack of judgment and tact and indicate definitely that he is not a team player", and he recommended to Marshall that Eaker, not Clark, be his successor in the Mediterranean. Marshall chose Lieutenant General Joseph T. McNarney on 22 October.

The activation of the French First Army left Seventh Army with only one corps. Devers asked for IV Corps to be transferred from Italy, but Wilson argued that would adversely affect operations in Italy against the Gothic Line, and the Combined Chiefs agreed. Instead, Devers proposed on 26 September that Major General Wade H. Haislip's XV Corps to be transferred from Patton's Third Army, which had severe logistical difficulties, to the Seventh Army. Devers argued that they could better be supported over the 6th Army Group's line of communications from the Mediterranean. Eisenhower agreed and further ordered for three more divisions scheduled to join Bradley's 12th Army Group in Northern France (although they were unlikely to do so until the supply and the transport situations improved), be diverted to Marseilles, and join the 6th Army Group. Haislip was a good fit: he spoke French fluently, had fought in France during World War I, had attended the École supérieure de guerre from 1925 to 1927, and was attuned to French sensibilities. Above all, Haislip got along well with Major General Philippe Leclerc de Hauteclocque, the mercurial commander of the French 2nd Armored Division. Devers was shocked when Leclerc informed him that he and his men wanted to serve with the U.S. Army, not the French First Army, which he considered dominated by Vichy French traitors.

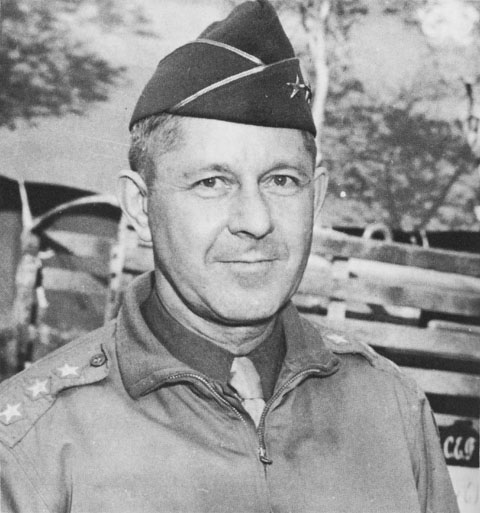
Despite the administrative nature of his position, Devers spent most of his time at the front

Devers may have oversold the benefits of the southern line of communications. Marseille had been captured, but the harbor entrance was blocked with 75 sunken ships; the harbor basin had been sown with naval mines; the quays, jetties and cranes had been demolished; and the surrounding area had been filled land mines and booby traps. The U.S. Navy cleared the harbor, and the 1051st Port Construction and Repair Group undertook the rehabilitation of the port. Ships were able to discharge in the stream from 5 September, and the first Liberty ship docked on 15 September. Beyond the port, there were numerous breakages in the rail network, and many bridges were down. To get the railroad from Marseille working, Devers turned to Brigadier General Carl R. Gray Jr., the commander of the 1st Military Railway Service. By 25 September, the railroad had reached Lyon with a capacity of 3,000 short tons (2,700 t) per day. Devers pressed Gray for 15,000 short tons (14,000 t). By 1 October, when Devers had promised Eisenhower that he could support ten divisions by rail, sufficient supplies were arriving for just one. The rest had to be supported by road. Not until the third week in October could all of the Seventh Army's needs, including those of XV Corps, be met.

Devers conceded that he could supply Patton with only 1,000 short tons (910 t) per day from 15 November, which only increased Eisenhower's resolve to give priority to opening the port of Antwerp, in the north. Devers was ordered to clear the Wehrmacht from the west bank of the Rhine in his sector. His offensive went well; the French 1st Armored Division reached the Rhine on 19 November, and Leclerc captured Strasbourg on 23 November. Devers inflicted a crushing defeat on the German Nineteenth Army, nearly destroying six of its eight divisions. A large German presence remained west of the Rhine, which came to be called the Colmar Pocket. When Eisenhower and Bradley visited 6th Army Group on 24 November, they were astonished to find Devers, Patch, and Haislip energetically planning a crossing of the Rhine in early December. Bradley drew attention to the formidable defenses on the far bank, and Devers told him that he had spoken to patrols, who had found them empty. Eisenhower would have none of it. His strategy remained to destroy the German forces on the west bank before he would attempt a crossing. Official historians described this decision as "difficult to understand".

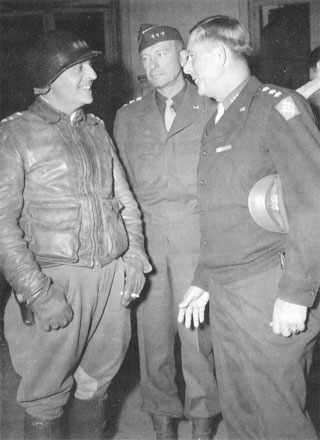
Lieutenant Generals Lucian K. Truscott Jr. and Alexander M. Patch with Devers

General Eisenhower discusses the war situation with some of his senior commanders at a forward command post, November 1944. From left to right: Lieutenant General Alexander Patch, Major General Edward H. Brooks, Lieutenant General Jacob L. Devers, General Eisenhower, and Lieutenant General Omar Bradley.

An attempt to reduce the Colmar Pocket on 15 December was called off by Eisenhower when Bradley was hit by the German Ardennes Offensive, which Brigadier General Garrison H. Davidson, the Seventh Army's chief engineer, felt might have been avoided entirely if Devers had been allowed to proceed with the Rhine crossing. In response to the crisis, Eisenhower ordered Devers to cease offensive operations and to assume responsibility for much of Patton's front, which would allow the Third Army to turn north. That left the Seventh Army holding a 126-mile (203 km) front with six infantry and two armored divisions. Eisenhower ordered Devers to withdraw to a shorter line, but Devers balked at that, and there was a violent French reaction to the prospect of abandoning Strasbourg. On 31 December 1944, the Seventh Army was struck by Operation Nordwind. Between 5 and 25 January 1945, there were four more major German attacks against the 6th Army Group by Heinrich Himmler's Army Group Oberrhein. Seventh Army suffered some 14,000 casualties, but the Germans did not break through, and Strasbourg was held. In Devers's estimation Brooks, the commander of VI Corps, "fought one of the great defensive battles of all times with very little".

Devers now turned his attention to the Colmar Pocket. He had expected the Germans to withdraw and thought that the French First Army could reduce the pocket. He later admitted that he had underestimated the German determination to hold it and had overestimated de Lattre's ability to keep moving against renewed and strengthened German resistance. Eisenhower regarded the pocket as a "sore" and sent five additional American divisions to 6th Army Group. After the Ardennes Offensive and Operation Northwind, Devers regarded it as petty of Bradley to begrudge him the additional divisions. French and American troops finally eliminated the Colmar Pocket on 5 February 1945. Against Eisenhower's preference, Devers was promoted to full general (four stars) on 8 March 1945, ahead of Spaatz, Bradley, and Patton, remaining the second-highest ranking American officer in Europe, after Eisenhower.

Seventh Army crossed the Rhine on 26 March and began advancing into Germany. On 5 May 1945, General Hermann Foertsch surrendered Army Group G unconditionally to Devers. Patch, Haislip, and other American generals were present, but there was no representative of the French First Army. That caused a final diplomatic tussle with the French over the status of the German Twenty-Fourth Army, which de Lattre insisted should surrender to him. Devers refused to hand the 24th Army's General Hans Schmidt over to de Lattre. Two days later, Eisenhower accepted a general surrender of the German armed forces at his headquarters at Reims.

=== Army Ground Forces ===
Following the surrender of Germany on 8 May 1945, Seventh Army was transferred to 12th Army Group, and the French First Army reverted to French control, which left 6th Army Group with little to do, although Devers acted as commander of 12th Army Group in Bradley's absence. In June 1945, Devers was appointed Chief of Army Ground Forces, in succession to General Joseph Stilwell, who had left to command the Tenth United States Army on Okinawa. Army Ground Forces still controlled schools and training centers in the United States, but their focus was demobilization and the co-ordination of the redeployment of units from Europe to the Pacific, where the war with Japan continued until it also surrendered on 14 August 1945. Devers hired a civilian secretary, Dorothy Benn, a widow whose husband, an Army Air Forces pilot, had been listed as missing in action in New Guinea in 1943 and was presumed dead until his body was found in 1957.

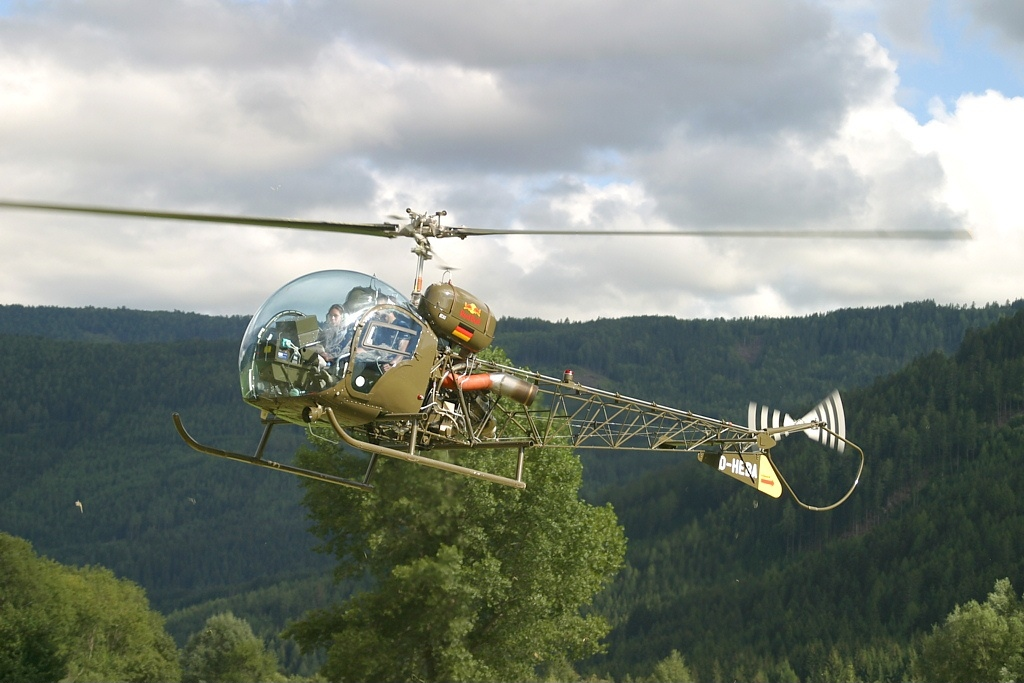
A Bell 47 helicopter

The Army Service Forces were abolished on 14 May 1946 on the recommendation of the War Department's Simpson Board, but the Army Ground Forces remained. Devers's November 1945 testimony before the board had urged for the Army Service Forces to be retained. Army Ground Forces was given control of the six armies in the United States, but as demobilization continued, the strength of the army shrank dramatically. Devers was faced with the unpleasant task of informing many officers that they were being demoted. One reform that he achieved was to reduce the number of combat branches to three: infantry, armor, and artillery.

McNair had established Army Ground Forces headquarters at the Army War College campus, where Devers lived, but Stilwell had moved the headquarters into the Pentagon. Eisenhower, as the new Chief of Staff of the Army, decided that the Army Ground Forces headquarters should be co-located with the Army Air Forces' Tactical Air Command at Fort Monroe, Virginia, not far from Langley Field. Devers opened his headquarters there on 1 October 1946. Further reorganization occurred on 10 March 1948, when Army Ground Forces was renamed Army Field Forces. Control of the armies was transferred to the Department of the Army, and Army Field Forces were reduced to a coordinating staff agency.

As a member of the Joint Research and Development Committee with Spaatz, Devers took an interest in the development of helicopters and took rides in different machines. He met with Larry Bell, the founder of Bell Aircraft. The company was in a poor financial situation, and Bell hoped the army would buy fifty of his new Bell 47 helicopters. Devers was impressed with the aircraft and agreed to do so but for $25,000 each, rather than the $35,000 asked for by Bell; Devers found the money from Army Ground Forces funds. The Bell H-13 Sioux became one of the world's most recognizable helicopters.

== List of major assignments ==
- Commander, 9th Infantry Division - 1 October 1940 to 31 July 1941
- Commander, Armored Force - 1 August 1941 to 8 May 1943
- Commander, European Theater of Operations, US Army - 9 May 1943 to 15 February 1944
- Commander, North African Theater of Operations, United States Army - 8 January 1944 to 22 October 1944
- Deputy Supreme Allied Commander, Mediterranean Theater - 8 January 1944 to 22 October 1944
- Commander, Sixth Army Group - 1 August 1944 to 15 June 1945
- Chief, Army Ground Forces - 29 June 1945 to 9 March 1948
- Commander, Army Field Forces - 10 March 1948 to 30 September 1949

== Retirement and post-military career ==
Devers was given mandatory retirement on his 62nd birthday, 30 September 1949. Devers and his wife, Georgie, decided to buy a farm in Herndon, West Virginia, although they retained their "Yellow House" in Georgetown, District of Columbia, where Georgie had resided during the war. Devers settled into the role of a cattle rancher. He hired Curtis and Beatrix Murphy as handyman and cook. When he discovered that they owed $2,000 in hospital bills, he paid it for them and never accepted repayment. They continued working for him until his death.

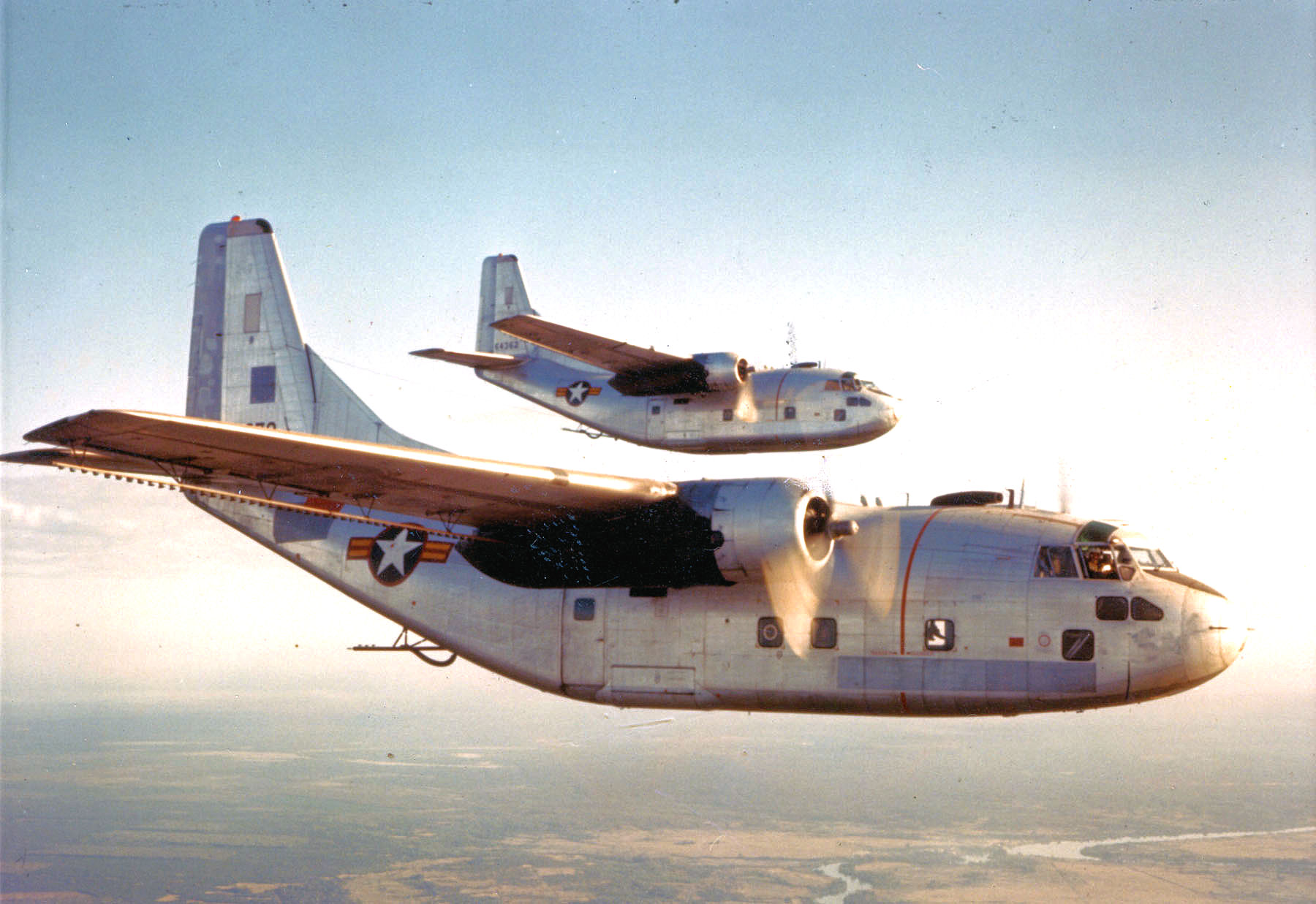
Fairchild C-123 Providers

Finding that the life of a rancher did not sufficiently hold his interest, Devers accepted a job as managing director of the American Automobile Association Foundation for Traffic Safety. He hired Dorothy Benn as his executive assistant. The job mostly involved fund-raising, which Devers did not enjoy, and he left when a better opportunity as technical assistant to the president of Fairchild Aircraft presented itself in 1950. He successfully lobbied the U.S. Air Force to buy the Fairchild C-123 Provider. He was also a strong advocate of Fairchild's AR-15 rifle, which he maintained was a much better weapon than the Army's M14 rifle, which he described as "obsolescent". As the M16 rifle, the AR-15 ultimately supplanted the M14.

Devers also served briefly in 1951 as military advisor to Frank P. Graham, the United Nations mediator in the dispute between India and Pakistan over the status of Kashmir. Eisenhower, now president, had Devers represent the United States at 10th anniversary ceremonies for the invasion of Southern France in 1954, for the dedication of Epinal American Cemetery and Memorial and the Rhone American Cemetery and Memorial in France, and for that of the Sicily–Rome American Cemetery and Memorial in Italy. In 1960, as Devers was leaving Fairchild, Eisenhower asked him to replace Marshall as chairman of the American Battle Monuments Commission. He remained in that role until 1969. In May 1964, he joined a number of other retired generals, including Eaker, Clyde Eddleman and Merrill B. Twining, for Joint Exercise Desert Strike, a major military exercise.

The farm was sold, and Devers and Georgie moved back to the Yellow House in 1957. Her health declined in the 1960s; she died on 8 February 1967, and was buried at Arlington National Cemetery. Dorothy Benn's second husband, a Harvard economics professor who worked for the Department of Agriculture, died in 1973, and she married Devers on 28 May 1975. He died at Walter Reed Army Medical Center on 15 October 1979, and was buried with Georgie at Arlington National Cemetery. He was survived by Dorothy, who died in 2007; his daughter Frances, who died in 1986; his sister Catherine and stepdaughter Bonnie Benn Stratton; and her sons, Troy DuVal Stratton and W. Benn Stratton, who graduated with the West Point class of 1983. Alex Graham died in 1977; Alex and Frances are buried at Arlington near Devers and Georgie. Devers's papers are at the York County History Center in York.

== Dates of rank ==
Insignia	Rank	Component	Date	Reference
No insignia in 1909	Second Lieutenant	Regular Army	11 June 1909	
	First Lieutenant	Regular Army	1 April 1916	
	Captain	Regular Army	15 May 1917	
	Major	National Army	5 August 1917	
	Lieutenant Colonel	National Army	30 July 1918	
	Colonel	National Army	24 October 1918	
	Reverted to permanent rank of captain	Regular Army	20 August 1919	
	Major	Regular Army	1 July 1920	
	Lieutenant Colonel	Regular Army	26 February 1934	
	Colonel	Regular Army	1 July 1938	
	Brigadier General	Regular Army	1 May 1940	
	Major General	Army of the United States	1 October 1940	
	Major General	Regular Army	22 February 1941	
	Lieutenant General	Army of the United States	6 September 1942	
	General	Army of the United States	8 March 1945	
	General	Retired List	30 September 1949	

== Awards and decorations ==
U.S. military decorations
Army Distinguished Service Medal with two oak leaf clusters
Navy Distinguished Service Medal
Bronze Star Medal
U.S. Military Service Medals
World War I Victory Medal
Army of Occupation of Germany Medal
American Defense Service Medal
American Campaign Medal
European-African-Middle Eastern Campaign Medal with five service stars
World War II Victory Medal
Army of Occupation Medal with "Germany" clasp
International and Foreign Awards
Grand Officer of the Order of the Liberator General San Martín (Argentina)
Commander of the Order of Leopold (Belgium)
Croix de guerre with palm (Belgium)
Order of Military Merit, Grand Cross (Brazil)
Star of Gold (Chile)
Grand Cordon of the Order of the Nile (Egypt)
Legion of Honor, Grand Officer (France)
Croix de guerre 1939–1945 with palm (France)
Order of the Bath, Knight Commander (United Kingdom)
Order of Military Merit (1st Class) (Mexico)
Order of Virtuti Militari, Silver Cross (Poland)

== Footnotes ==
Military offices
Preceded by Newly activated organization	Commanding General 9th Infantry Division; 1940–1941	Succeeded by Rene Edward De Russy Hoyle
Preceded by Adna R. Chaffee Jr.	Commanding General, Armored Force; 1 August 1941 – May 1943	Succeeded by Alvan Cullom Gillem Jr.
Preceded by Frank M. Andrews	Commanding General of U.S. Army Europe; 7 May 1943 – 16 January 1944	Succeeded by Dwight D. Eisenhower
Preceded by Joseph W. Stilwell	Commanding General of U.S. Army Ground Forces; 29 June 1945 – 9 March 1948	Succeeded by becomes Army Field Forces
Preceded by was Army Ground Forces	Commanding General of U.S. Army Field Forces; 10 March 1948 – 10 September 1949	Succeeded by Mark W. Clark
