= NS24 =

NS24, NS 24, NS-24, NS.24, or variation, may refer to:

== Places ==
- Dhoby Ghaut MRT station (station code: NS24), Dhoby Ghaut, Museum Planning Area, Singapore; a mass transit station
- Glace Bay-Dominion (constituency N.S. 24), Nova Scotia, Canada; a provincial electoral district

== Other uses ==
- New Penguin Shakespeare volume 24
- Blue Origin NS-24 (20 December 2023), an uncrewed suborbital spaceflight by the New Shepard

== See also ==
- NS (disambiguation)
- 24 (disambiguation)
