= 24 =

24 may refer to:

- 24 (number), the natural number following 23 and preceding 25
- one of the years 24 BC, AD 24, 1924, 2024

== Science ==
- Chromium, a transition metal in the periodic table
- 24 Themis, an asteroid in the asteroid belt

== Film and television ==
- 24 frames per second, a common frame rate in film and television
- 24 (TV series), an American show depicting the events of a single day in 24 real-time episodes per season
  - 24: Live Another Day, a 2014 continuation of the original television series
  - 24: Redemption, a 2008 television movie related to the television series
  - 24: The Game, a 2006 video game based on the television series
- 24 (Indian TV series), an Indian TV series based on the American show of the same name
- 24 (2001 film), a Czech thriller film
- 24 (2016 film), an Indian Tamil film
- 24 (2021 film), a Singaporean art film
- BR24 (TV program), a German television news program

== Music ==
=== Albums ===
- 24 (album), a compilation album by Christian group Point of Grace
- 24 (soundtrack), the soundtrack for the 2016 Tamil film of the same name
- 24: The Soundtrack, the soundtrack for the TV series of the same name

=== Songs ===
- "24" (Game Theory song), on the 1985 album Real Nighttime
- "24" (Jem song), on the 2004 album Finally Woken
- "24" (Money Man song), on the 2020 album Epidemic Deluxe
- "24" (Kanye West song), on the 2021 album Donda
- "24", a song by Fitz and the Tantrums on the deluxe edition of their 2022 album Let Yourself Free
- "24", a song by Lana Del Rey on the 2015 album Honeymoon
- "24", a song by TripleS on the 2024 album Assemble24
- "Twenty Four", a song by Karma to Burn from the album Appalachian Incantation, 2010
- "Twenty-Four", a song by Ogbert the Nerd from the 2020 album I Don't Hate You
- "24-24" a song by Cabaret Voltaire on the 1983 album The Crackdown

=== People ===
- Jeong Hoon Seo, nicknamed 24 (b. 1990), South Korean record producer

== Other uses ==
- 24 (puzzle), a mathematical card game

== See also ==
- 24 Horas (disambiguation)
- 24 Oras, a Filipino newscast of GMA Network
- Channel 24 (disambiguation)
- 2/4 (disambiguation)
- 24/7 (disambiguation)
- 24th (disambiguation)
- List of highways numbered 24
