= Kanal 24 =

Kanal 24 may refer to:

- 24 Kanal, a Ukrainian TV channel
- 24 (Turkey), a Turkish TV channel called Kanal 24 in Turkish
- Radio Norge, formerly Kanal 24, a Norwegian radio

== See also ==
- Channel 24 (disambiguation)
- 24 (disambiguation)
