= 24th Rifle Division =

24th Rifle Division can refer to:

- 24th Guards Rifle Division, Soviet Union, later the 42nd Guards Motor Rifle Division
- 24th Motor Rifle Division, Soviet Union, previously the 24th Rifle Division, later the Ukrainian 24th Mechanized Brigade

== See also ==
- 24th Division (disambiguation)
