= 24 Hours a Day =

24 Hours a Day or Twenty-Four Hours a Day may refer to:

- Twenty-Four Hours A Day, a 1954 book by Richmond Walker
- 24 Hours a Day, a 1997 album by the Bottle Rockets
- "Gotta Find Me a Lover (24 Hours a Day)", a 1969 song by Erma Franklin
- "24 Hours a Day", a 1976 song by Triumph

== See also ==
- 24 Hours (disambiguation)
