= Twenty-fourth of the month =

Recurring ordinal calendar date

The twenty-fourth of the month or twenty-fourth day of the month is the recurring calendar date position corresponding to the day numbered 24 of each month. In the Gregorian calendar (and other calendars that number days sequentially within a month), this day occurs in every month of the year, and therefore occurs twelve times per year.

- Twenty-fourth of January
- Twenty-fourth of February
- Twenty-fourth of March
- Twenty-fourth of April
- Twenty-fourth of May
- Twenty-fourth of June
- Twenty-fourth of July
- Twenty-fourth of August
- Twenty-fourth of September
- Twenty-fourth of October
- Twenty-fourth of November
- Twenty-fourth of December

In addition to these dates, this date occurs in months of many other calendars, such as the Bengali calendar and the Hebrew calendar.

== See also ==
- 24th (disambiguation)
