= 24 Heures =

24 Heures (French for "24 hours") may refer to:

== Events ==
- 24 Heures du Mans, the French-language name of 24 Hours of Le Mans, an annual sports car race held near Le Mans, France
- 24 heures vélo de Louvain-la-Neuve (English: The 24-Hour Bike Ride of Louvain-la-Neuve), an annual bicycle festival held in Louvain-la-Neuve, Belgium

== Publications ==
- 24 heures (Switzerland), a regional daily newspaper published in Lausanne, Switzerland
- 24 heures (Abidjan), a daily newspaper published in Abidjan, Côte d'Ivoire
- 24 Heures, the French-language edition in Montreal, Canada, of 24 Hours (newspaper), a chain of free daily newspapers published in Canada

== See also ==
- 24 Hours (disambiguation)
