= 24Hours (band) =

South Korean band

- Origin: Seoul, South Korea
- Genres: K-pop; alternative rock
- Years active: 2011–present
- Members: Beautiful Jin(Lee Seung Jin); Hyemi; Hyukjae; Eunhong
- Past members: Jiwon(~2014); Taewook(2015)

24Hours (Korean: 24아워즈) is an independent South Korean alternative rock band formed 2011 in Seoul. The group consists of four members: Seungjin, Hyemi, Hyukjae and Eunhong. They debuted on March 3, 2012 with the single album Blackhole.

== Career ==
=== Pre-debut ===
The members formed the band after they became an adult, but Seungjin(also known as Beautiful Jin) was a high school friend of some of the members of the band.Hyukjae joined the band as a friend of Seungjin as they were doing the same major in music. The name of the band was inspired from the group's musical endeavours at a 24 hour cafe where they discussed musical creations.

== Influences ==
The band initially had british bands such as The Kooks as role models of the music the group is aiming for.The group also mentioned they were influenced by the American band The Strokes.

== Members ==
Current

- Beautiful Jin (뷰리플진) — vocal, guitar
- Kim Hye-mi (김혜미) — lead guitar
- Kim Hyuk-jae (김혁재) — bass
- Min Eun-hong (민은홍) — drums (2014–present)

Former

- Kang Ji-won (강지원) — drums (2011–2014)

== Discography ==
=== Studio albums ===
| Title | Album details |
|---|---|
| Party People | Released: April 29, 2013; Label: Tripper Sound; Formats: CD, digital download; Track listing: 1. Party People inst.; 2. Tick Tock Tick Tock (째깍째깍); 3. Why; 4. I Can't Breathe (숨 쉴 수 없어); 5. Mirror Ball; 6. Don't Give Up; 7. John; 8. But I (그래도 난); 9. Orbital Sleep (잠이 안와); 10. Full (가득찬); 11. I'm Thinking About You (널 생각해) |

=== Extended plays ===
| Title | Album details |
|---|---|
| No Way Out | Released: September 25, 2014; Label: Mirrorball Music; Formats: CD, digital download; Track listing: 1. No Way Out inst.; 2. Rot (썩); 3. Today (오늘도); 4. Hey (있잖아); 5. Into Dreams (꿈 속으로) |
| Jane | Released: December 19, 2016; Formats: CD, digital download; Track listing: 1. Escape; 2. Get It On; 3. Our Night (우리밤); 4. Jane |

=== Single albums ===
| Title | Album details |
|---|---|
| Blackhole | Released: March 3, 2012; Label: Open Music; Formats: CD, digital download; Track listing: 1. Blackhole; 2. ABCD; 3. Jane |

=== Singles ===
| Title | Year | Album |
|---|---|---|
| "Tick Tock Tick Tock" (째깍째깍) | 2013 | Party People |
| "Escape" | 2015 | Jane |
| "Get It On" | 2016 | Jane |
| "Our Night" (우리밤) | 2016 | Jane |
