= Channel 24 TV stations in Mexico =

The following television stations broadcast on digital channel 24 in Mexico:

- XHAE-TDT in Saltillo, Coahuila de Zaragoza
- XHCAM-TDT in Campeche, Campeche
- XHCBM-TDT in Pátzcuaro, Michoacán de Ocampo
- XHCER-TDT in Chilpancingo, Guerrero
- XHCGC-TDT in Nuevo Casas Grandes, Chihuahua
- XHCHZ-TDT in Chihuahua, Chihuahua
- XHCTDG-TDT in Durango, Durango
- XHCTEN-TDT in Ensenada, Baja California
- XHCTOB-TDT in Ciudad Obregón, Sonora
- XHCTTR-TDT in Torreón, Coahuila
- XHCUI-TDT in Culiacán, Sinaloa
- XHCV-TDT in Coatzacoalcos, Veracruz de Ignacio de la Llave
- XHCVT-TDT in Ciudad Victoria, Tamaulipas
- XHFM-TDT in Veracruz, Veracruz de Ignacio de la Llave
- XHGA-TDT in Guadalajara, Jalisco
- XHGAT-TDT in Atarjea, Guanajuato
- XHGCN-TDT in Coroneo, Guanajuato
- XHGDM-TDT in Dr. Mora, Guanajuato
- XHGNB-TDT in Guerrero Negro, Baja California Sur
- XHGZG-TDT in Ciudad Guzmán, Jalisco
- XHHC-TDT in Monclova, Coahuila de Zaragoza
- XHHSS-TDT in Hermosillo, Sonora
- XHIMT-TDT in Mexico City
- XHINC-TDT in Santiago Pinotepa Nacional, Oaxaca
- XHJCC-TDT in San José del Cabo, Baja California Sur
- XHJCH-TDT in Ciudad Jiménez, Chihuahua
- XHLEJ-TDT in León, Guanajuato
- XHNOA-TDT in Nogales, Sonora
- XHPUR-TDT in Puebla, Puebla
- XHSLP-TDT in San Luis Potosí, San Luis Potosí
- XHSMA-TDT in San Miguel de Allende, Guanajuato
- XHSRB-TDT in Santa Rosalía, Baja California Sur
- XHTGN-TDT in Tulancingo, Hidalgo
- XHTMYC-TDT in Mérida, Yucatán
- XHTPG-TDT in Tepic, Nayarit
- XHTX-TDT in Tuxtla Gutiérrez, Chiapas
- XHTZL-TDT in Tamazunchale, San Luis Potosí
- XHVAD-TDT in Valladolid, Yucatán
- XHZHZ-TDT in Zacatecas, Zacatecas
