= Channel 24 virtual TV stations in the United States =

The following television stations operate on virtual channel 24 in the United States:

- K08PT-D in Bakersfield, California
- K15MW-D in Bellingham, Washington
- K19LY-D in Scipio, Utah
- K20OH-D in Ardmore, Oklahoma
- K24AG-D in Trapper Creek, Alaska
- K24CH-D in Cortez, etc., Colorado
- K24CY-D in St. George, Utah
- K24HH-D in Wichita Falls, Texas
- K24JE-D in Sunriver, Oregon
- K24JV-D in St. James, Minnesota
- K24KT-D in Walker, Minnesota
- K24KV-D in Logan, Utah
- K24NA-D in Delta, Utah
- K24OE-D in Jackson, Wyoming
- K25PE-D in Decorah, Iowa
- K29MP-D in Garrison, Utah
- K31ND-D in Oroville, California
- K31NJ-D in Lansing, Iowa
- K32OV-D in Lubbock, Texas
- K33KW-D in Delta, etc., Utah
- KAAP-LD in Santa Cruz, California
- KBCB in Bellingham, Washington
- KCCX-LD in Corpus Christi, Texas
- KFTA-TV in Fort Smith, Arkansas
- KGMM-CD in San Antonio, Texas
- KJHP-LD in Morongo Valley, California
- KKFX-CD in San Luis Obispo, California
- KLPB-TV in Lafayette, Louisiana
- KLTS-TV in Shreveport, Louisiana
- KMHC in Steamboat Springs, Colorado
- KMLN-LD in Fort Collins, Colorado
- KNDM in Minot, North Dakota
- KNLC in St. Louis, Missouri
- KNMT in Portland, Oregon
- KNVN in Chico, California
- KOMI-CD in Woodward, Oklahoma
- KPEJ-TV in Odessa, Texas
- KPJC-LD in San Francisco, California
- KPNZ in Ogden, Utah
- KQUP in Pullman, Washington
- KRUM-LD in Seattle, Washington
- KSAS-TV in Wichita, Kansas
- KSEE in Fresno, California
- KVCR-DT in San Bernardino, California
- KVUE in Austin, Texas
- KYCW-LD in Branson, Missouri
- KYIN in Mason City, Iowa
- W02CY-D in New York, New York
- W16DT-D in Keyser, West Virginia
- W19EP-D in Culebra, Puerto Rico
- W21DZ-D in Romney, West Virginia
- W21EA-D in Parkersburg, West Virginia
- W22CV-D in Moorefield, West Virginia
- W22DO-D in Utica, New York
- W24CP-D in Durham, North Carolina
- W24DB-D in Clarks Summit, Pennsylvania
- W24EI-D in Naranjito, Puerto Rico
- W24ET-D in Atlantic City, New Jersey
- W24FB-D in Brazil, Indiana
- W24FC-D in Augusta, Georgia
- W27EE-D in Martinsburg, West Virginia
- W27EJ-D in Sterling, Illinois
- W30CO-D in Wheeling, West Virginia
- W35DQ-D in Midland, Michigan
- WASA-LD in Port Jervis, New York
- WATN-TV in Memphis, Tennessee
- WCNY-TV in Syracuse, New York
- WDDA-LD in Chattanooga, Tennessee
- WDGT-LD in Miami, Florida
- WDLH-LD in Evansville, Indiana
- WDTT-LD in Knoxville, Tennessee
- WEAC-CD in Jacksonville, Alabama
- WEDH in Hartford, Connecticut
- WEQT-LD in Gainesville, Georgia
- WFXZ-CD in Boston, Massachusetts
- WGXA in Macon, Georgia
- WILT-LD in Wilmington, North Carolina
- WJET-TV in Erie, Pennsylvania
- WJPX in San Juan, Puerto Rico
- WKYU-TV in Bowling Green, Kentucky
- WMDN in Meridian, Mississippi
- WMYO-CD in Louisville, Kentucky
- WNPB-TV in Morgantown, West Virginia
- WNPX-LD in Nashville, Tennessee
- WNWO-TV in Toledo, Ohio
- WPHA-CD in Philadelphia, Pennsylvania
- WPVN-CD in Chicago, Illinois
- WQPT-TV in Moline, Illinois
- WTAT-TV in Charleston, South Carolina
- WTBM-CD in Birmingham, Alabama
- WTLF in Tallahassee, Florida
- WUCF-TV in Orlando, Florida
- WUTB in Baltimore, Maryland
- WVTV-DT2 in Milwaukee, Wisconsin
- WWEO-LD in Defuniak Springs, Florida
- WXOD-LD in Palm Beach, Florida
- WZBJ in Danville, Virginia
- WZBJ-CD in Lynchburg, Virginia

The following stations, which are no longer licensed, formerly operated on virtual channel 24 in the United States:

- K24IQ-D in Billings, Montana
- K24JI-D in Hermiston, Oregon
- K24KD-D in Salix, Iowa
- KIJK-LD in Lincoln, Nebraska
- KRUB-LD in Cedar Rapids, Iowa
- KXLJ-LD in Juneau, Alaska
- KVAW in Eagle Pass, Texas
- KZSA-LD in San Angelo, Texas
- W07DN-D in Wardensville, etc., West Virginia
- W09CT-D in Mathias, etc., West Virginia
- W24BB-D in East Stroudsburg, Pennsylvania
- W24DE-D in Miami, Florida
- W24DM-D in Gainesville, Florida
- W24DN-D in Clarksburg, West Virginia
- WDLP-CD in Pompano Beach, Florida
- WLNN-CD in Boone, North Carolina
- WODX-LD in Springfield, Illinois
