= Hans Schmidt (general of the Infantry) =

German general (1877–1948)

- Born: 28 April 1877; Ulm, Kingdom of Württemberg, German Empire
- Died: 5 June 1948 (aged 71); Stuttgart, Germany
- Military career
- Allegiance: German Empire; Weimar Republic; Nazi Germany
- Branch: Imperial German Army; Reichswehr; German Army (Wehrmacht)
- Service years: 1895–1945
- Rank: General der Infanterie
- Commands: 260th Infantry Division; IX Army Corps; 24th Army
- Conflicts: World War I World War II
- Awards: Knight's Cross of the Iron Cross with Oak Leaves; German Cross in gold

Hans Schmidt (28 April 1877 – 5 June 1948) was a German general during World War II. He was also a recipient of the Knight's Cross of the Iron Cross with Oak Leaves of Nazi Germany.

Schmidt was born at Ulm in 1877 and joined the Imperial German Army in 1895. He served in World War I and, at the end of the war, he was a Major on the staff of the 9th Infantry Division. He was awarded both classes of the Iron Cross, the House Order of Hohenzollern and many other decorations. He remained in the post-war Reichswehr as a career officer. Schmidt was promoted to Generalmajor in October 1929, to Generalleutnant in September 1940 and to General der Infanterie in January 1942. In World War II, he commanded the 260th Infantry Division from September 1939 until January 1942. At that time, he was given the command of IX Army Corps until October 1943 when he was placed into the Führerreserve. He returned to command the newly formed German 24th Army on the western front from November 1944 until it surrendered in May 1945.

== Decorations ==
- Iron Cross (1914), 2nd class and 1st class
- Knight's Cross of the House Order of Hohenzollern with swords
- Knight's Cross 4th class, Order of the Crown (Prussia)
- Military Merit Order of Bavaria, 4th class with swords and crown
- Knight's Cross 2nd class of the Albert Order
- Knight's Cross 1st class with swords of the Friedrich Order
- Knight's Cross of the Württemberg Military Merit Order
- Hanseatic Cross of Hamburg
- Military Merit Cross of Austria-Hungary, 3rd class with war decoration
- Honour Cross of the World War 1914/1918
- Clasp to the Iron Cross (1939) 2nd class (31 December 1939) & 1st class (4 July 1940)
- German Cross in gold on 6 November 1942 as General der Infanterie zur Verwendung (for disposition) and commanding general of the IX. Armeekorps
- Knight's Cross of the Iron Cross with Oak Leaves
  - Knight's Cross on 22 September 1941 as Generalleutnant zur Verwendung (for disposition) and commander of the 260. Infanterie-Division
  - 334th Oak Leaves on 24 November 1943 as General der Infanterie and commanding general of the IX. Armeekorps (Note: According to Scherzer as Generalleutnant.)
