= 2/4 =

2/4 may refer to

- February 4 (month-day date notation)
- 2 April (day-month date notation)
- 2/4 time, a duple time signature used, for example, for polkas
- 2nd Battalion 4th Marines
- 2/4 (single album), a single album by South Korean band Onewe

== See also ==
- One half (the reduced fraction 2/4)
