= 24th Battalion =

24th Battalion may refer to:

- 24th Battalion (Australia), an infantry battalion of the Australian Army that served in World War I
- 2/24th Battalion (Australia), an infantry battalion of the Australian Army that served in World War II
- 24th Battalion (International Brigade), Cuban volunteer unit that fought for the Republicans during the Spanish Civil War
- 24th Battalion (Victoria Rifles), CEF, a Canadian infantry battalion that served in World War I
- 24th Battalion (New Zealand), a World War II infantry battalion from New Zealand
- 24th Battalion (Ukraine), a volunteer battalion of the Ukrainian Army that served in War in Donbas
- 24th Battalion, Royal Fusiliers (2nd Sportsmen's)

== See also ==
- 24th Division (disambiguation)
- 24th Brigade (disambiguation)
- 24th Regiment (disambiguation)
