= 24th Street =

24th Street may refer to:

- 24th Street (San Diego Trolley station), San Diego, California
- North 24th Street, Omaha, Nebraska
- South Omaha Main Street Historic District, a.k.a. South 24th Street, Omaha, Nebraska
- 24th Street (Manhattan), New York, New York
- 24th Street (PTC station), Philadelphia, Pennsylvania

== See also ==
- 24th Street Mission (BART station)
- 24th Street and Washington Street and 24th Street and Jefferson Street (Metro Light Rail station), Phoenix, Arizona
