= Alexander Conrady =

German Army general

- Born: 16 July 1903; Neu-Ulm
- Died: 21 December 1983 (aged 80)
- Military career
- Allegiance: Weimar Republic; Nazi Germany
- Branch: German Army
- Service years: 1923–1945
- Rank: Generalmajor
- Commands: 36. Infanterie-Division
- Conflicts: World War II; Invasion of Poland; Battle of France; Operation Barbarossa; Battle of Kursk; Operation Bagration
- Awards: Knight's Cross of the Iron Cross with Oak Leaves

Alexander Conrady (16 July 1903 – 21 December 1983) was a German general during World War II who commanded the 36th Infantry Division. He was a recipient of the Knight's Cross of the Iron Cross with Oak Leaves of Nazi Germany. Conrady was taken prisoner by Soviet troops during Operation Bagration on the night of the 30th of June 1944 while traveling in a halftrack containing two other German Generals, General Hoffmeister and General Engel. They had originally been reported missing but it was later revealed that they were captured. He was released in 1955.

== Awards and decorations ==
- Wehrmacht Long Service Award 3rd Class (2 October 1936)
- Iron Cross (1939) 2nd Class (4 October 1939) & 1st Class (2 July 1940)
- Eastern Front Medal (16 July 1942)
- Infantry Assault Badge (23 November 1941)
- German Cross in Gold on 24 December 1941 as Major in the I./Infanterie-Regiment 118 (motorized)
- Knight's Cross of the Iron Cross with Oak Leaves
  - Knight's Cross on 17 October 1942 as Oberstleutnant and commander of I./Infanterie-Regiment 118
  - 279th Oak Leaves on 22 August 1943 as Oberst and commander of Grenadier-Regiment 118

Military offices
Preceded by Generalleutnant Egon von Neindorff	Commander of 36. Infanterie-Division; 19 January 1944 – 1 July 1944	Succeeded by Generalmajor August Well
