= 24th Army (Wehrmacht) =

- German: 24. Armee
- Active: November 1944 – May 1945
- Country: Nazi Germany
- Branch: Heer ( Wehrmacht)
- Type: Field army
- Engagements: World War II

Commanders
- Sole commander: Hans Schmidt

The 24th Army (German: 24. Armee) was a field army–level organization of the German Army during World War II. Created in November 1944, it existed for the final seven months of the war in Europe and never reached significant combat strength before surrendering to the Western Allies in May 1945.

== History ==
The 24th Army was formed in November 1944 from an auxiliary corps command at the Germany–Switzerland border. The army command was assigned to the control of 19th Army, but did not possess combat formations of its own. After March 1945, it appears in German documents as "Fortress Alps" command. Still on border duty and under command by Hans Schmidt, the army command (strengthened by Volkssturm and frontier battalions) was overtaken by the French invasion of southwestern Germany and had to flee across Lake Constance by boat to escape envelopment. In late April and early May, as the German front was collapsing, the nominal 24th Army was assigned with two understrength divisions, the 405th Division and 465th Division.

In the final days of the war, the scattered elements of 24th Army were attacked by the 1st Army Corps of 1st French Army (Jean de Lattre de Tassigny) in North Tyrol and Vorarlberg. On 30 April 1945, the 4th Moroccan Mountain Division and 5th French Armored Division seized Bregenz. On 4 May, Hans Schmidt made contact with French forces to negotiate a surrender with de Lattre de Tassigny, while negotiations were also going on between Franco–American forces with the 19th Army. De Lattre de Tassigny hoped to secure 24th Army's surrender in an exclusive fashion (as only French forces opposed the 24th Army), but Schmidt settled in the interim to fall in with the greater policy of Army Group G to surrender to the 6th US Army Group (Jacob L. Devers). The surrender by Army Group G, as well as by broader German forces in southern Germany (under overall command by Albert Kesselring), had gone into effect at noon on 6 May, but De Lattre de Tassigny, insulted at the American commanders' non-concern with French opinions, did not recognize 24th Army as a subordinate of 19th Army, choosing instead to view it as a continually active force. Intermittent fighting thus continued late on 6 May 1945, but the French demands for Hans Schmidt's surrender to France were ignored. The issue eventually died down along with the fighting as the German forces disintegrated in the aftermath of surrender.

== Commanders ==
No.	Portrait	Commander	Took office	Left office	Time in office
1	Hans Schmidt	General der Infanterie; Hans Schmidt (1877–1948)	November 1944	6 May 1945	6 months
