= Twenty-Four Hours A Day =

Self-help book by Richmond Walker

- Author: Richmond Walker
- Language: English
- Subject: Spiritual
- Genre: non-fiction
- Publication place: United States

Twenty-Four Hours A Day, written by Richmond Walker (1892–1965), is a book that offers daily thoughts, meditations and prayers to help recovering alcoholics live a clean and sober life. It is often referred to as "the little black book." The book is not official ("conference approved") Alcoholics Anonymous literature.

== History ==
In 1952, while looking for educational materials for alcoholics, Hazelden President Pat Butler came across a small volume titled Twenty-Four Hours A Day. The author, Richmond Walker of Daytona Beach, Florida, was publishing, selling, and distributing the volume himself. Butler offered to assume publication and distribution of the work. Walker agreed after the General Service Board of Alcoholics Anonymous showed no interest in the undertaking. In May 1954, Hazelden purchased the rights to Twenty-Four Hours A Day. Close to 5,000 copies were sold in the first year. Today, Twenty-Four Hours a Day has sold over eight million copies in 30 countries and is a staple of many twelve-step groups.
