= Ogbert the Nerd =

American emo band

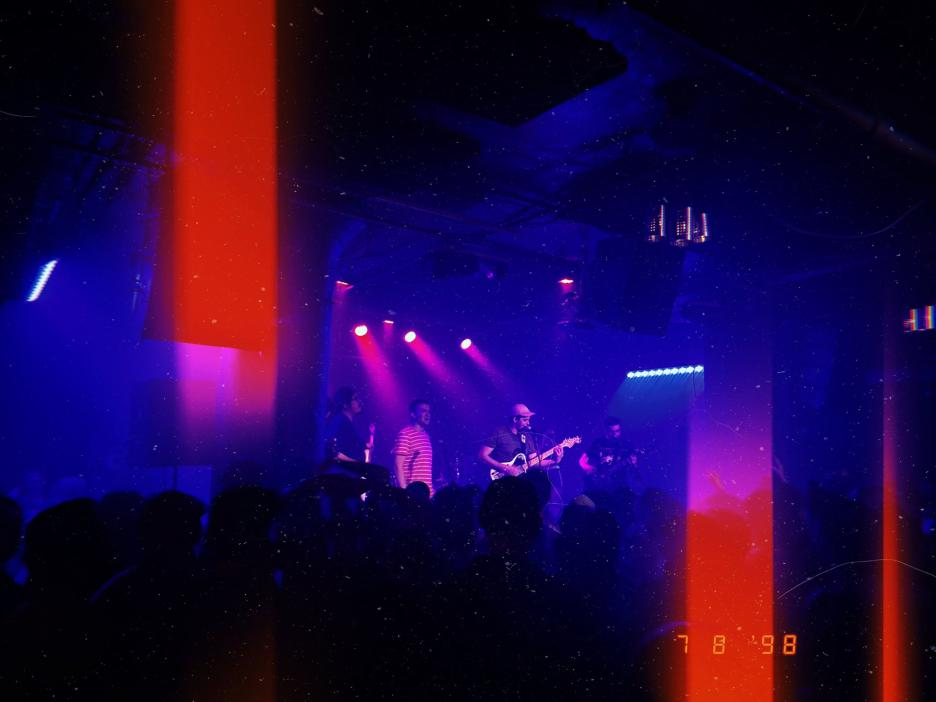
- Ogbert the Nerd performing in Philadelphia, Pennsylvania in 2021

Background information
- Origin: New Brunswick, New Jersey
- Genres: Punk rock; indie rock; emo revival
- Years active: 2018–present
- Members: Madison James; Shawn Ofray; Ross Lane; Geoffery Swanson; Matthew Renzo

Ogbert the Nerd is an American emo band from New Brunswick, New Jersey. The band formed in 2018 and has released two albums, I Don't Hate You in 2020 and What You Want in 2024, an EP, and a few singles.

== History ==
Named after a joke from 30 Rock, the band members grew up in the New Jersey music scene, attending shows and playing in various bands, then formed Ogbert the Nerd in 2018.

On February 24, 2019, the band put out their first release, an EP simply titled EP. Recorded between January and February of that year, it featured three songs that would later be re-recorded for the band's debut.

On Halloween 2020, the band released "Do It For Elio" and announced that their debut album would be released on December 11. On November 27, the band released the second single for the album, "Snail". I Don't Hate You, their debut, was released through Sun Eater Records. In an overall positive review, Stereogum's Chris DeVille called the album "extremely fun and shouty", as well as "raw, unhinged, [and] massively catchy". IDIOTEQ referred to as "brilliantly contagious and emotionally raw".

The following two years, NJ.com included the band on their lists of "N.J. Bands You Need To Hear".

In 2021, the band released I Don't Hate You: Bric-à-brac Edition, featuring instrumentals, demos, and live performances of songs from I Don't Hate You.

In 2022, Ogbert the Nerd released the single A New Kind of Borkulator. Stereogum's DeVille noted that the song "leads with a piercing vocal line that will be a litmus test for your tolerance of screechy, neurotic emo vocals." He concluded, "Those who vibe with that style will be treated to another chaotically catchy barnburner full of rad riffs and memorable lyrics".

The following year, the band released the single Bike Cops. Stereogum's DeVille wrote, "It’ll raise your pulse, test your lung capacity, and send tingles down your spine". IDIOTEQ called it "an adrenaline-fueled, emo-drenched spectacle, with intense lyrics". The single was later issued as a limited edition 7" vinyl in 2024 on lead singer Madison James' Bored Science Ltd label.

In 2024, James attracted media attention for releasing three singles under the domain name "taylorswift.bandcamp.com". They, in the past, had also released music under "mychemicalromance", "daftpunk", and "nickiminaj" Bandcamp pages. On May 2, Bandcamp usurped the URLs for those pages. On May 24, Ogbert released the "For Posterity" single, along with the announcement of their second album, What You Want, releasing that summer.

== Members ==
- Madison James (lead vocals, guitar)
- Ross Lane (guitar, backing vocals)
- Shawn Ofray (bass)
- Geoffery Swanson (bass)
- Douglas Kinsella (DJ)
- Matthew Renzo (drums)

== Discography ==
=== Albums ===
- I Don't Hate You (2020, Sun Eater Records)
- What You Want (2024)

=== EPs ===
- EP (2019)
- Live from Minecraft (2020)

=== Singles ===
- "Do It For Elio" (2020)
- "Snail" (2020)
- "A New Kind of Borkulator" (2022)
- "Bike Cops" (2023)
- "For Posterity" (2024)
- "Rudolph the Red-Nosed Reindeer" (2025)
- "Stapler" (2026)

=== Compilation appearances ===
- When The Sun Is Blinding (2020, Good Authority)
- Clubhouse Pride (2020)
- Good Noise: Vol. 1 (2020)
- Never Hungover Again (Again!) (2021)
