= 24 Squadron =

24 Squadron may refer to:

- No. 24 Squadron RAF
- No. 24 Squadron RAAF
- No. 24 Squadron PAF, Pakistan Air Force
- 24 Squadron SAAF
