= 24 Horas =

24 Horas may refer to:

- 24 horas (Chilean TV program), a Chilean newscast by Televisión Nacional de Chile
- 24 Horas (Colombian TV program), broadcast by the programadora 24 Hours
- 24 Horas (Mexican TV program), broadcast by Televisa
- 24 Horas (Peruvian TV program), broadcast by Panamericana Televisión
- 24 Horas (Spanish TV channel), a Spanish television news channel

== See also ==
- 24 Oras, a Filipino newscast
