= 24th Brigade =

24th Brigade may refer to:

== Australia ==
- 24th Brigade (Australia)

== Bangladesh ==
- 24th Artillery Brigade (Bangladesh)

== Greece ==
- 24th Armoured Brigade (Greece)

== India ==
- 24th Indian Infantry Brigade

== Japan ==
- 24th Independent Mixed Brigade (Imperial Japanese Army)
- 24th Mixed Brigade (Imperial Japanese Army)

== Russia/Soviet Union ==
- 24th Separate Guards Special Forces Brigade

== Ukraine ==
- 24th Mechanized Brigade (Ukraine)

== United Kingdom ==
- 24th Armoured Brigade (Dummy Tanks)
- 24th Armoured Brigade (United Kingdom)
- 24th Infantry Brigade (United Kingdom)
- 24th (Gold Coast) Brigade later 2nd (West Africa) Infantry Brigade
- 24th Reserve Brigade
- 24th Brigade, Royal Field Artillery

== See also ==
- 24th Division (disambiguation)
- 24th Regiment (disambiguation)
- 24 Squadron (disambiguation)
