= 24th Division =

24th Division may refer to:

== Infantry divisions ==
- 24th Infantry Division (Bangladesh)
- 24th Airborne Division, France
- 24th Division (German Empire)
- 24th Reserve Division, German Empire
- 24th Infantry Division (Wehrmacht), Germany
- 24th Waffen Mountain Division of the SS Karstjäger, Germany
- 24th Infantry Division "Pinerolo", Italy
- 24th Division (Imperial Japanese Army)
- 24th Infantry Division (Poland)
- 24th Infantry Division (Russian Empire)
- 24th Guards Mechanized Division, Soviet Union
- 24th Guards Rifle Division, Soviet Union
- 24th Mechanized Division (Soviet Union)
- 24th Motor Rifle Division, Soviet Union, previously the 24th Rifle Division, later the Ukrainian 24th Mechanized Division
- 24th Division (Spain)
- 24th Infantry Division (Syrian rebel group)
- 24th Mechanized Division (Ukraine), previously the Soviet 24th Motor Rifle Division
- 24th Division (United Kingdom)
- 24th Infantry Division (United States)
- 24th Division (Yugoslav Partisans)

== Cavalry divisions ==
- 24th Cavalry Division (Soviet Union)
- 24th Cavalry Division (United States)

== Armoured divisions ==
- 24th Panzer Division, Wehrmacht, Germany
- 24th Tank Division (Soviet Union)

== Aviation divisions ==
- 24th Fighter Aviation Division, People's Republic of China
- 24th Air Division, United States

== Other divisions ==
- 24th Submarine Division, Soviet Union/Russia

== See also ==
- 24th Division War Memorial
- List of military divisions by number
- 24th Army (disambiguation)
- XXIV Corps (disambiguation)
- 24th Brigade (disambiguation)
- 24th Regiment (disambiguation)
- 24th Battalion (disambiguation)
- 24th Squadron (disambiguation)
