= 24th Regiment =

24th Regiment may refer to:

== Infantry regiments ==
- 24th Regiment of Foot, a unit of the British Army
- 24th Regiment of Bengal Native Infantry, a unit of the British Army
- 24th Punjabis, a unit of the British Army
- 24th Infantry Regiment (United States), a unit of the United States Army
- 24th Marine Regiment (United States), a unit of the United States Army
- 24th Arkansas Infantry Regiment, a unit of the United States Army
- 24th Indiana Infantry Regiment, a unit of the United States Army
- 24th Tennessee Infantry Regiment, a unit of the United States Army
- 24th Connecticut Infantry Regiment, a unit of the United States Army
- 19th and 24th Consolidated Arkansas Infantry Regiment, a unit of the United States Army
- 24th Wisconsin Volunteer Infantry Regiment, a unit of the United States Army
- 24th New York Volunteer Infantry Regiment, a unit of the United States Army
- 24th Michigan Volunteer Infantry Regiment, a unit of the United States Army
- 24th Iowa Volunteer Infantry Regiment, a unit of the United States Army
- 24th Illinois Volunteer Infantry Regiment, a unit of the United States Army

== Cavalry regiments ==
- 24th Regiment of (Light) Dragoons, a unit of the British Army
- 24th Regiment Grey's Horse, a former unit of Canadian Army 1908 to 1936

== Engineering regiments ==
- 24 Commando Regiment (United Kingdom), a unit of the British Army's Royal Engineers

== Artillery regiments ==
- 24th Field Artillery Regiment (Canada), a unit of the Canadian Army
- 24th Field Artillery Regiment (United States), a unit of the United States Army
