= Delattre =

Delattre or de Lattre is a surname, and may refer to:

- Adolphe Delattre, French ornithologist
- Alfred Louis Delattre, French archaeologist
- Bernard de Lattre de Tassigny, French army officer
- Jean de Lattre de Tassigny, French army general
- Marie Delattre
