= Battle of the Day River =

1951 battle of the First Indochina War

- Part of the First Indochina War
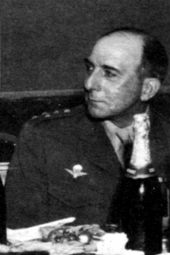
- Jean de Lattre de Tassigny, commander of the French Union forces, who lost his only son (Bernard de Lattre de Tassigny) in the battle.
| Date | May 30 – June 18, 1951 |
| Location | Vietnam, French Indochina |
| Result | French Union victory |
| Territorial changes | Red River Delta remains under the control of France and the State of Vietnam |

Belligerents
| French Union: France; French Indochina; State of Vietnam | Democratic Republic of Vietnam: (North Vietnam) Việt Minh |

Commanders and leaders
| (French Fourth Republic) Jean de Lattre de Tassigny | (North Vietnam) Võ Nguyên Giáp |

Strength
| (French Fourth Republic) 3 mobile groups (French Fourth Republic) 2 para battalions (French Fourth Republic) 1 dinassaut (South Vietnam) Local Catholic militia | Three divisions |

Casualties and losses
| (French Fourth Republic) 107 killed, 289 wounded, 189 missing (South Vietnam) Few hundreds | Western estimates: 9,000 killed 1,000 captured Việt Minh figures: 546 killed, 1,700 wounded, 280 missing |

The Battle of the Day River (French: bataille du Day) took place between late May and early June 1951, around the Day River Delta in the Gulf of Tonkin. Part of the First Indochina War, the battle was the first conventional campaign of Võ Nguyên Giáp, and saw his Việt Minh People's Army of Vietnam (VPA) forces tackle the Catholic-dominated region of the Delta in order to break its resistance to communist Việt Minh infiltration. On the back of two defeats at similar ventures through March and April that year, Giap led three divisions in a pattern of guerrilla and diversion attacks on Ninh Bình, Nam Định, Phủ Lý and Phat Diem beginning on May 28 which saw the destruction of commando François, a naval commando.

The French army and Vietnamese National Army, under Jean de Lattre de Tassigny, who lost his son in the first day of the battle at Ninh Bình, mobilised three mobile groups (groupements mobiles, similar to regimental combat teams) and two paratrooper battalions as well as one dinassaut, and the ebb and flow of captured and retaken positions continued until Giap's supply lines were cut around June 6. His forces, moving in large numbers and during daylight, were vulnerable to French firepower and to French ground forces supported by a friendly local Catholic militia. The Việt Minh army units were forced into withdrawing between June 10 and June 18. The Western's sources estimated Việt Minh lost 1,000 prisoners to the French and 9,000 casualties. Việt Minh reported they were suffered 546 killed, 1,700 wounded, 280 missing
