= Jean de Lattre de Tassigny =

French general (1889–1952)

Marshal Jean de Lattre de Tassigny
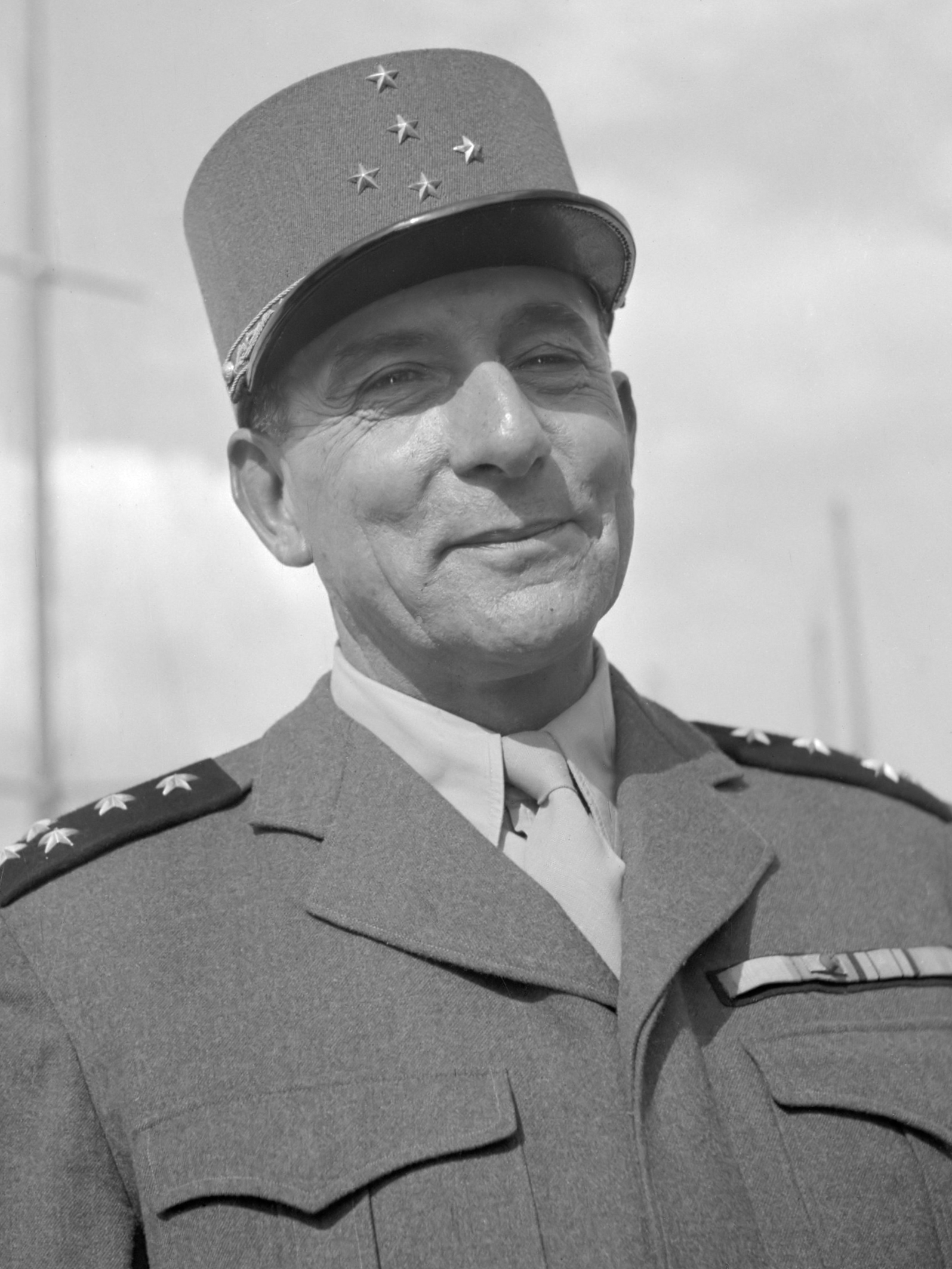
- General de Lattre in 1946

32nd Chief of the Army Staff
- In office 30 November 1945 – 12 March 1947
- Preceded by: Maurice Gamelin
- Succeeded by: Georges Revers

Personal details
- Born: 2 February 1889 Mouilleron-en-Pareds, France
- Died: 11 January 1952 (aged 62) Paris, France
- Spouse: Simonne Calary de Lamazière
- Children: Bernard de Lattre de Tassigny
- Education: École spéciale militaire de Saint-Cyr; École de guerre
- Nickname: Le Roi Jean

Military service
- Allegiance: Third Republic; Vichy France; Free France; Provisional Government; Fourth Republic
- Branch/service: French Army; Cavalry (until 1915); Infantry (from 1915)
- Years of service: 1911–1952
- Rank: Army general (Note: Marshal of France is a dignity and not a rank.)
- Unit: List: 12th Dragoons Regiment; 93rd Infantry Regiment; 49th Infantry Regiment; 21st Tirailleurs Regiment; 4th Infantry Regiment; 46th Infantry Regiment; 5th Infantry Regiment
- Commands: List: 151st Infantry Regiment; 14th Infantry Division; 16th Military Region; 2nd Army; First Army; Commander-in-Chief of Ground Forces in Western Europe; Far East Expeditionary Corps
- Battles/wars: World War I; Battle of the Frontiers; Battle of Verdun; Nivelle offensive; 3rd Battle of the Aisne; Meuse-Argonne offensive; Rif War; Operations in Upper Moulouya; Operations in Taza; World War II; Battle of France; Invasion of Elba; Operation Dragoon; Colmar Pocket; Invasion of Germany; First Indochina War; Battle of Vĩnh Yên; Battle of Mạo Khê; Battle of the Day River; Battle of Hòa Bình

Jean Joseph Marie Gabriel de Lattre de Tassigny (Note: French pronunciation: [ʒɑ̃ də latʁ də tasiɲi]) (2 February 1889 – 11 January 1952) was a French général d'armée during World War II and the First Indochina War. He was posthumously elevated to the dignity of Marshal of France in 1952.

As an officer during World War I, he fought in various battles, including at Verdun, and was wounded five times, surviving the war with eight citations, the Legion of Honour, and the Military Cross. During the Interwar period, he took part in the Rif War in Morocco, where he was again wounded in action. He went on to serve in the Ministry of War and the staff of Conseil supérieur de la guerre under the vice president Général d'armée Maxime Weygand.

Early in World War II, from May to June 1940, he was the youngest French general. He led the 14th Infantry Division during the Battle of France in the battles of Rethel, Champagne-Ardenne, and Loire, until the Armistice of 22 June 1940. During the Vichy Regime he remained in the Armistice Army, first in regional command posts then as commander-in-chief of troops in Tunisia. After the Allied invasion of French North Africa in November 1942 the Germans invaded the unoccupied portion of France; de Lattre, Commander of the 16th Military Division at Montpellier, refused the orders not to fight the Germans and was the only active general to order his troops to oppose the invaders. He was arrested but escaped and defected to Charles de Gaulle's Free French Forces at the end of 1943. From 1943 to 1945 he was one of the senior leaders of the Liberation Army, commanding the forces that landed in the South of France on 15 August 1944, then fought up to the Rivers Rhine and Danube. He commanded large numbers of American troops when the US XXI Corps was assigned to his First Army during the battle of the Colmar Pocket. He was also the French representative at the signing of the German Instrument of Surrender in Berlin on 8 May 1945.

He became Commander-in-Chief of French Forces in Germany in 1945, then Inspector General and Chief of Staff of the French Army. In March 1947 he became the vice-president of the Conseil supérieur de la guerre. From 1948 to 1950 he served as Commander-in-chief of the Western Union's ground forces. In 1951 he was the High Commissioner, commander-in-chief in Indochina and commander-in-chief of the French Far East Expeditionary Corps, winning several battles against the Việt Minh. His only son was killed there, and then illness forced him to return to Paris where he died of cancer in 1952. He was elevated to the dignity of Marshal of France posthumously in 1952 during his state funeral.

== Early life ==
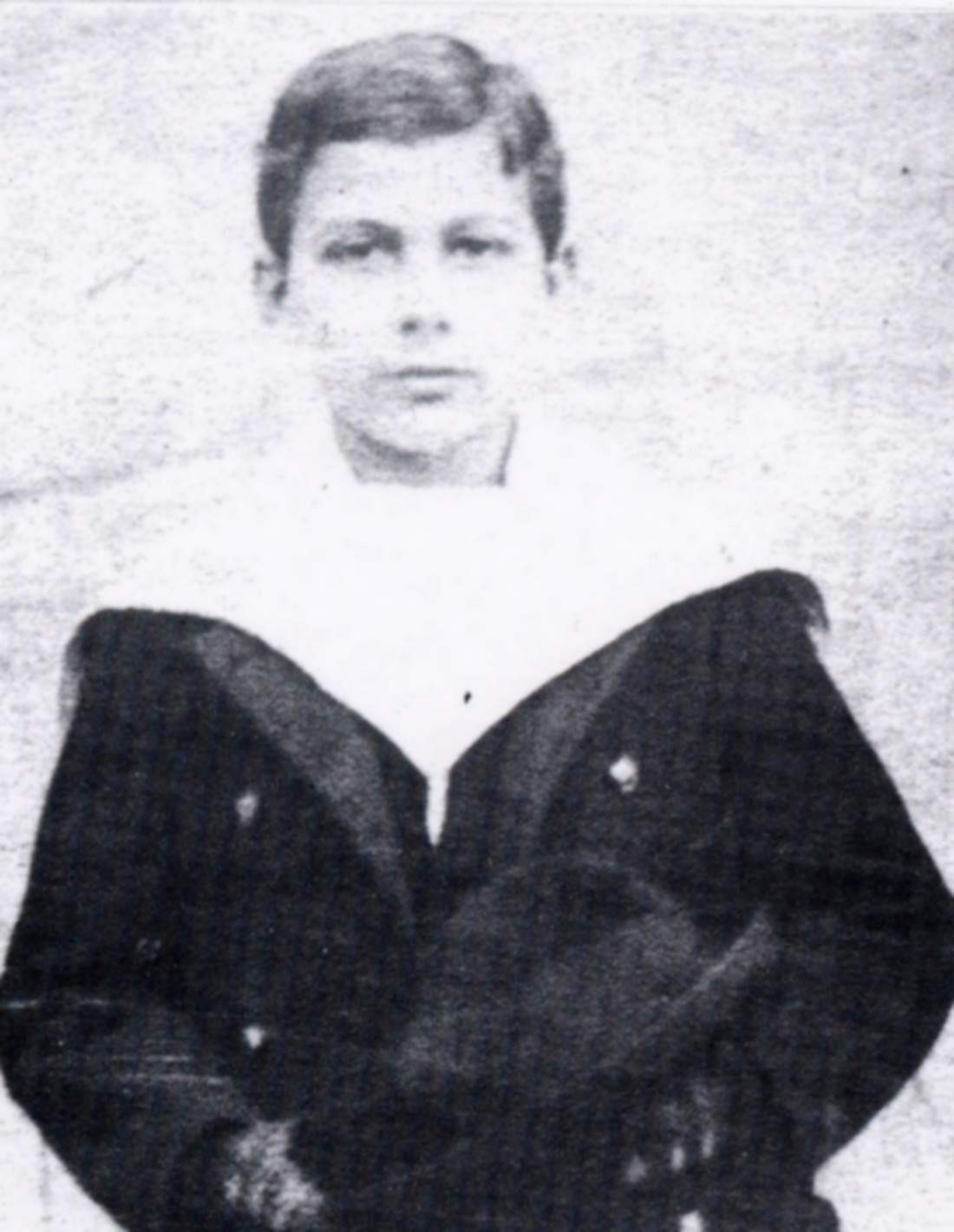
De Lattre as a student, c. 1903

Arms of the de Lattre de Tassigny family

Jean Joseph Marie Gabriel de Lattre de Tassigny was born on 2 February 1889 in Mouilleron-en-Pareds, Vendée, in the same village as World War I leader Georges Clemenceau. He was the son of Roger de Lattre de Tassigny and Anne-Marie Louise Henault, the daughter of the mayor of Mouilleron. Her grandfather had been his predecessor, assuming the office in 1817. In turn, Roger de Lattre succeeded his father-in-law as mayor in 1911, and still held the office forty years later. An ancestor had added the suffix "de Tassigny" to the family name in 1740, after the family property of Tassigny near Guise. He had an older sister, Anne-Marie, who later became the Comtesse de Marcé.

From 1898 to 1904 de Lattre attended the College of Saint-Joseph in Poitiers, where his father had gone. He then decided that he would join the Navy, and to prepare he went to the College de Vaugirard, where Henri de Gaulle was a teacher. He passed the written examinations for the Navy but missed the oral examination owing to illness. He then went to the Corniche at Lycée privé Sainte-Geneviève in Versailles to prepare for the École spéciale militaire de Saint-Cyr, where he won a place in 1908. Before he entered, his father sent him to Brighton in England to improve his English. As was the custom in the French Army, he also served in the ranks for four months, in his case, with the 29th Dragoon Regiment at Provins, south east of Paris. He was a cadet at Saint-Cyr from 1909 to 1911 (Mauritanie promotion). One instructor expressed the hope that de Lattre was not related to the one who had raised the white flag of Henri, Count of Chambord over Saint-Cyr in 1873. This was his uncle, and henceforth de Lattre refused to have anything to do with the instructor. He ultimately graduated 201st out of 210 in his class, and was commissioned as a second lieutenant on 1 October 1910. He then went on to the Saumur Cavalry School.

== First World War ==
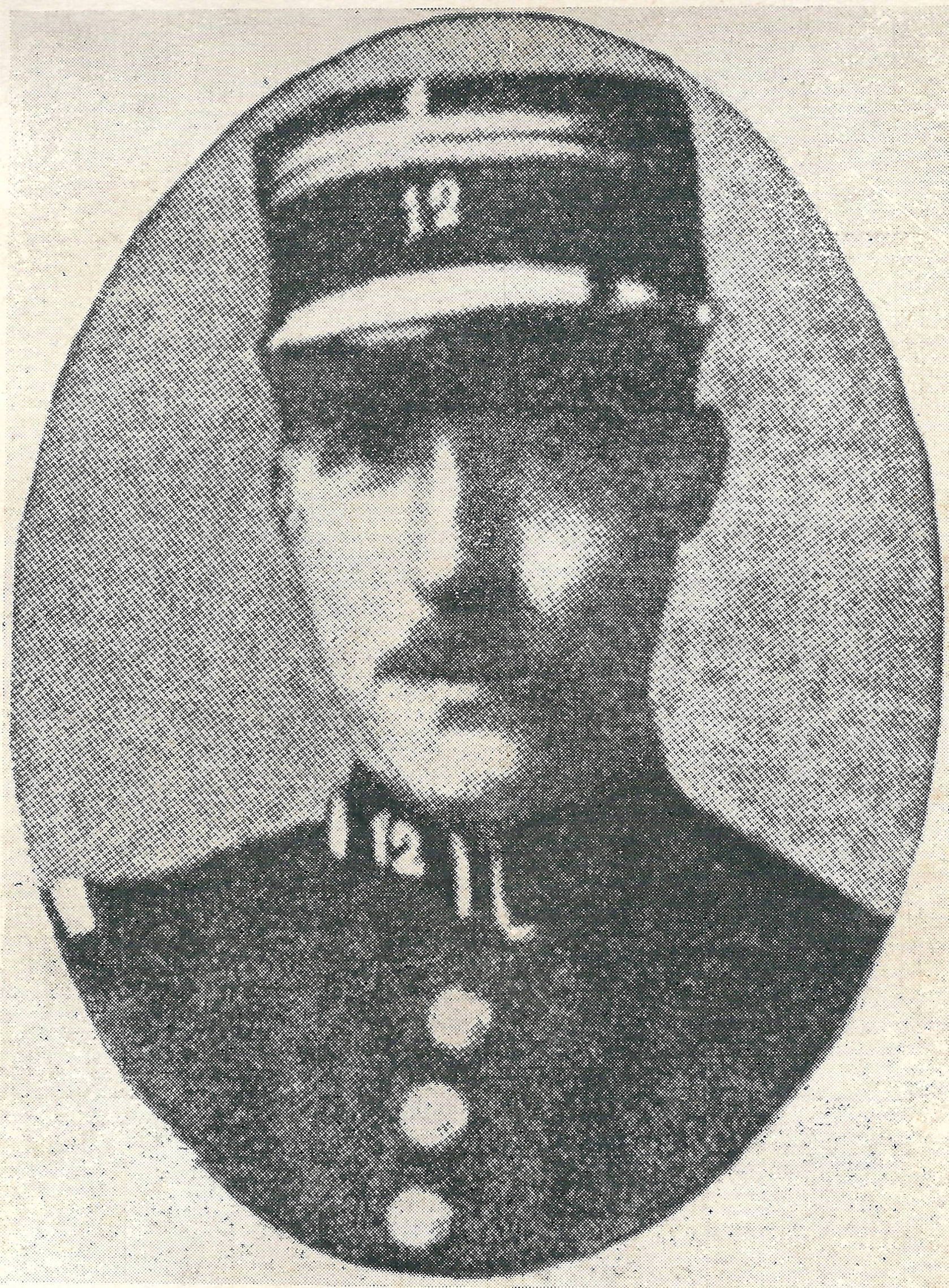
De Lattre as a lieutenant in the 12th Dragoon Regiment, 1914

De Lattre was assigned to the 12th Dragoon Regiment, which was stationed at Toul and Pont-à-Mousson near the frontier with Germany and still wore red riding breeches and a helmet with a plume. He was promoted to lieutenant on 1 October 1912. He was still serving there when the First World War broke out in August 1914. On 11 August 1914, he was wounded for the first time when he was hit in the knee by a shell fragment during a reconnaissance mission. On 14 September, he was wounded a second time, in an engagement with four Bavarian Uhlans during which he killed two with his sword, but a third struck him in the chest with a lance, perforating his lung. His troop sergeant took him to a cellar in Pont-à-Mousson, where they hid from German patrols until one from the 5th Hussar Regiment reached them. He received the Legion of Honour on 20 December 1914.

In 1915, de Lattre responded to an appeal for cavalry officers to volunteer for service in the infantry, and he joined a Vendée regiment, the 93rd Infantry Regiment. He was promoted to captain on 18 December 1915, and was a company commander and then assistant battalion commander in its 3rd Battalion. As part of the 21st Infantry Division, the 93rd Infantry Regiment fought in the Battle of Verdun, where he was gassed in July 1916. The mustard gas affected his injured lung, necessitating time in hospital. He was back with the 21st Infantry Division in time to participate in the ill-fated Nivelle offensive in April 1917. In an attack on 5 May, his battalion suffered 300 casualties, but captured 500 prisoners. De Lattre received his eighth mention in despatches. He was hospitalised again that month, and did not return until December, when he became an intelligence officer on the 21st Infantry Division staff. The division was decimated in the Third Battle of the Aisne in May 1918, but it was reconstituted and fought in the Meuse-Argonne offensive later that year, during which de Lattre liaised with the staffs of three divisions of the United States Army.

== Between the wars ==
In February 1919, de Lattre was assigned to the 18th Military District section at Bordeaux, where his duties included providing recreation for American troops prior to their repatriation. At the end of the year he joined the 49th Infantry Regiment, which was stationed at Bayonne. From 1921 to 1926, he was in Morocco, where he participated in the campaigns of the Rif War. He became the head of the Third Bureau (the staff section responsible for operations) of the Meknes area, and directed operations in Upper Moulouya. These normally involved two or more columns, each with between four and eight battalions of infantry and attached artillery and transport, converging on a locality. The following year operations moved on to the rugged Taza Province. De Lattre was critical of the tactics used by Marshal Philippe Pétain, which he regarded as slow, expensive and materialistic. He was slashed in the right cheek by an assailant wielding a dagger on 13 March 1924, resulting in a prominent scar, and he was wounded in the knee by a bullet on 26 August 1925 during a reconnaissance mission. He was promoted to the rank of chef de bataillon (commandant) on 25 June 1926.

De Lattre returned to France, where he spent several weeks with his parents at Mouilleron-en-Pareds. At a luncheon given by a deputy for Vendée, he met Simonne Calary de Lamazière, the nineteen-year-old daughter of a Paris deputy. They met again at a party on the Île d'Yeu, an island off the Vendée coast. They were married on 22 March 1927, at Saint-Pierre-de-Chaillot in Paris. They had one child, Bernard de Lattre de Tassigny, who was born on 11 February 1928. De Lattre was also "generally suspected of homosexual leanings." (Driving with him on his daily tour of inspection in January 1945, the seventeen-year-old John Julius Norwich recalled: "I did have a little trouble keeping his hand off my thigh in the car on the way home...but nothing serious.")

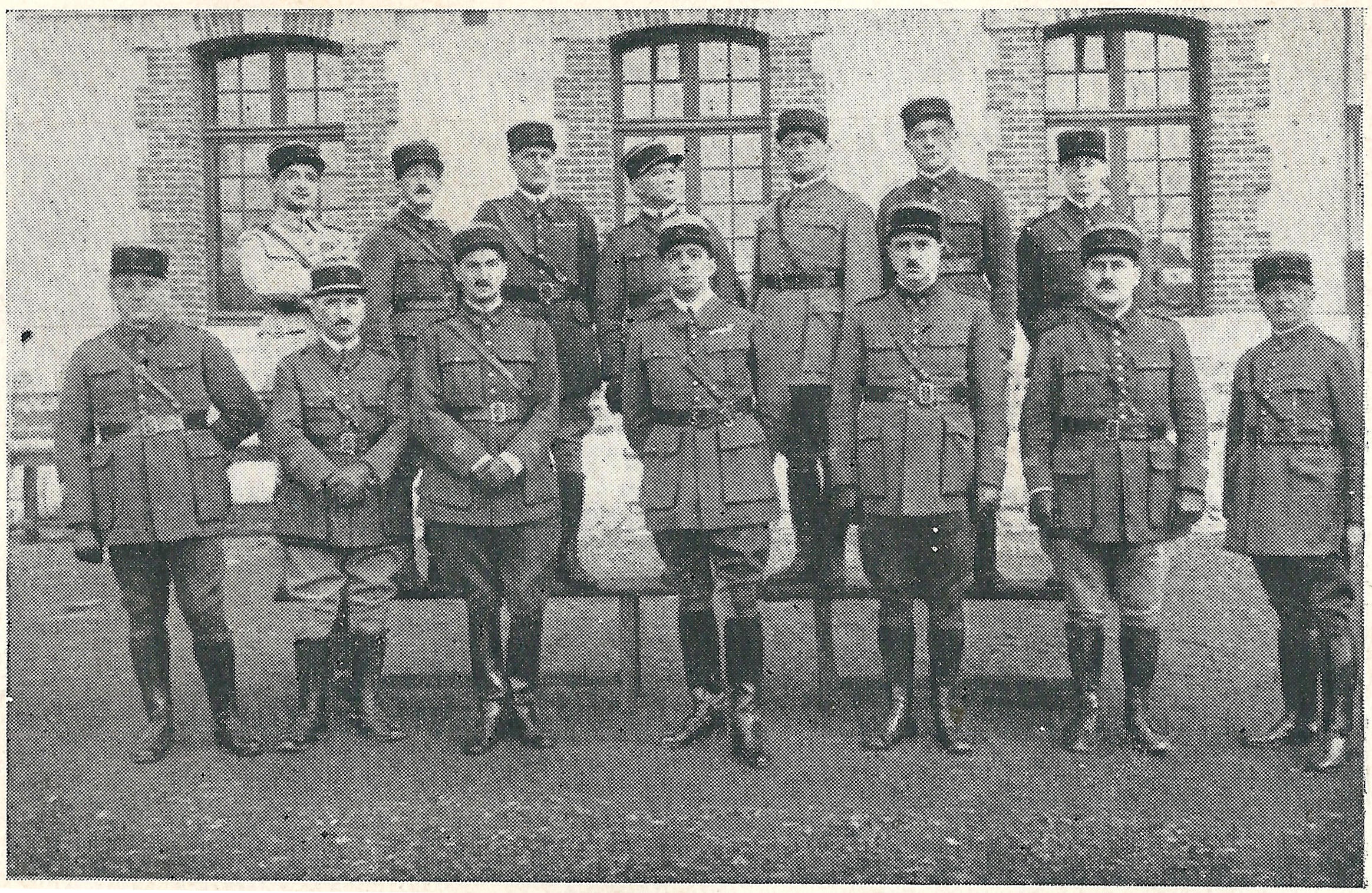
De Lattre (center) as a battalion commander in the 5th Infantry Regiment at Coulommiers, 1928

De Lattre commanded a battalion of the 4th Infantry Regiment, which was stationed at Auxerre, and prepared for the entrance examination for the École de guerre, coached by Captain Augustin Guillaume, an officer he had met while serving in Morocco. He managed to pass the examinations, and entered the École de guerre as the senior officer of his year. One of the staff exercises involved command of an invading force tasked with capturing Cherbourg from the sea. After graduation in 1928, he was assigned to the 5th Infantry Regiment at Coulommiers as a battalion commander.

In 1931, de Lattre was assigned to the 4th Bureau of the Ministry of War, responsible for logistics. He was promoted to lieutenant-colonel on 24 March 1932. On 20 June, he joined the staff of the Conseil supérieur de la guerre, serving under the vice president, Général d'armée Maxime Weygand. During this posting, he was tasked mainly with following foreign international policies, internal politics, and the challenges of complex military budget initiatives. He became embroiled in the Stavisky affair and had to appear before a parliamentary commission. With the retirement of Weygand, who had reached mandatory retirement age, de Lattre was retained on the general headquarters staff of Général Alphonse Joseph Georges. On 20 June 1935, he was promoted to colonel and appointed commander of the 151st Infantry Regiment at Metz. Between 1937 and 1938, he studied at the Centre des hautes études militaires (CHEM), an advanced staff college for generals. In July 1938 he became Chief of Staff at the headquarters of the military governor of Strasbourg, Général d'armée Pierre Héring. Hering retired in March 1939, and was succeeded by Général d'armée Victor Bourret. On 20 March, de Lattre was promoted to général de brigade.

== World War II ==
=== Battle of France ===
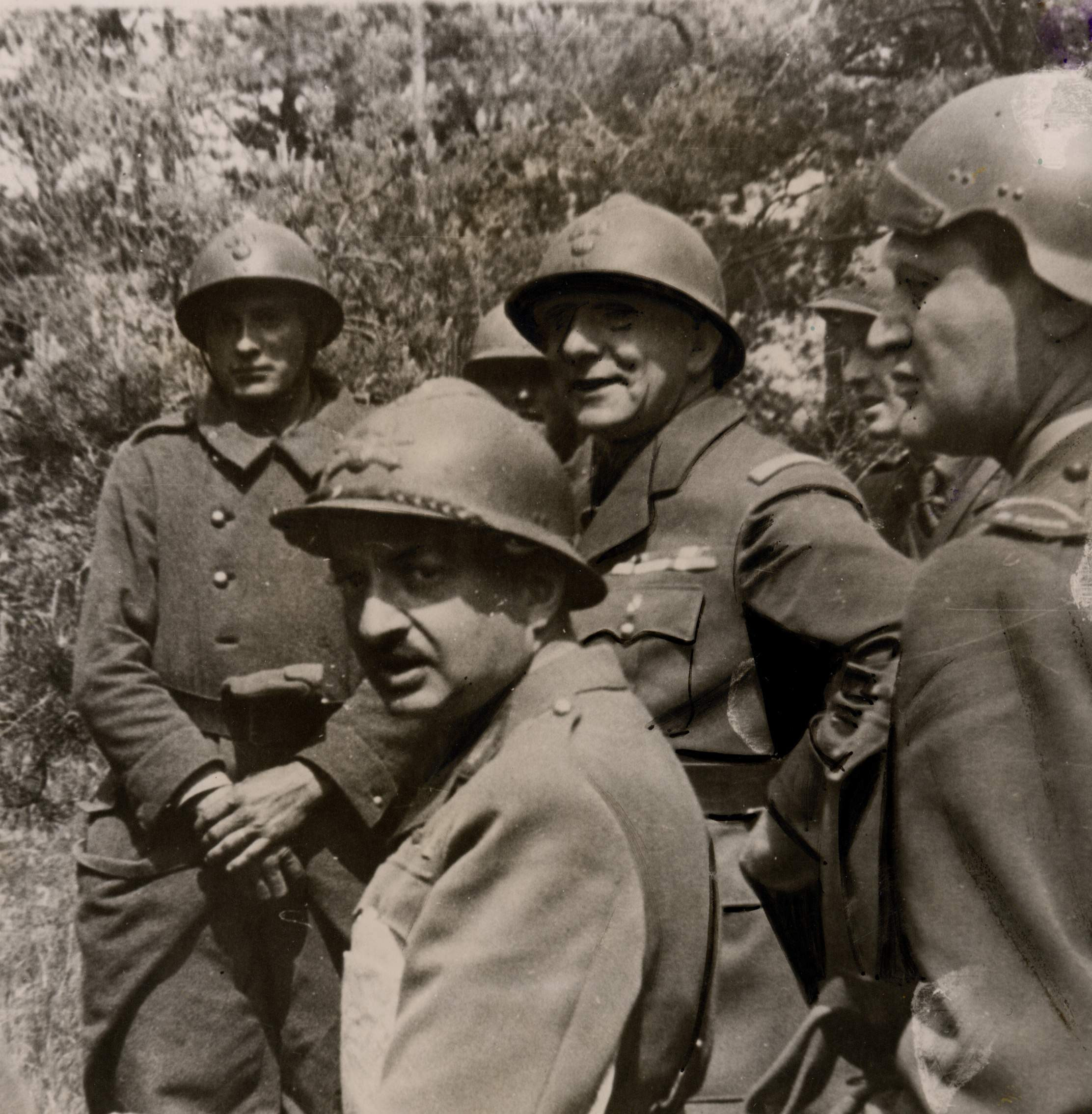
General de Lattre during the battles near Rethel, 20 May 1940

De Lattre became the chief of staff at general headquarters of the Fifth Army on 2 September 1939. The following day France declared war on Germany again. In January 1940, he was given command of the 14th Infantry Division, which was holding the sector between Sarreguemines and Forbach. On 14 May, four days after the main German offensive began, the 14th Infantry Division was ordered to move to Rheims, where it came under the command of André Corap's Ninth Army.

De Lattre engaged the German forces around Rethel, where his division resisted for an entire month, repelling German assaults in front of the River Aisne. On 9 June, the German Twelfth Army launched a major assault on the 14th Infantry Division's positions. Although it managed to hold on, the divisions on its flanks could not, and de Lattre was forced to retreat to the Marne, and then the Loire. Part of his division was cut off at Chalons. Although it lost about two-thirds of its strength, the division retained its cohesion in the midst of chaos. When the Armistice of 22 June 1940 ended the fighting, the 14th Infantry Division was at Clermont-Ferrand.

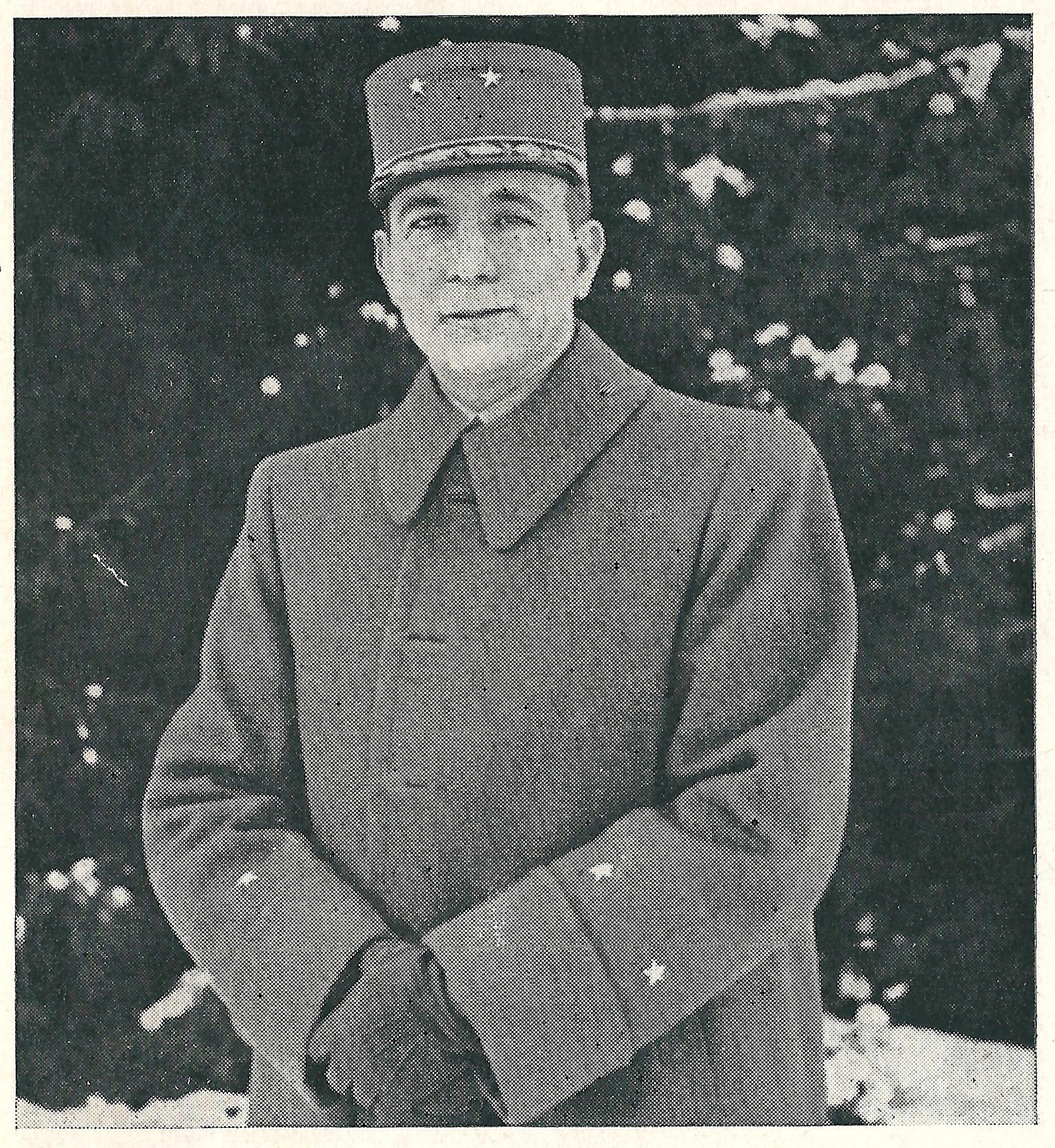
De Lattre as général de brigade, 1939

=== Army of Vichy ===
Following the armistice de Lattre remained in the Army of Vichy France. He was made a Grand Officer of the Legion of Honour on 12 July for his handling of the 14th Infantry Division in the Battle of France, an award Weygand, to whom he remained loyal, conferred on him in person. De Lattre was appointed to command the 13th Military Division, the military district at Puy-de-Dôme in the Massif Central, where he established a training centre for officers and non-commissioned officers at Château d'Opme. He was promoted to général de division on 26 June 1941.

In September 1941 Weygand, now the Delegate-General of The Vichy government in North Africa, summoned de Lattre to North Africa as the commander-in-chief of troops in the protectorate of Tunisia. De Lattre opened another military instruction centre there at Salammbô near Carthage, modelled on the one at Opme. He clashed with his superior, Général de Corps d'Armée Alphonse Juin, over the best way to defend Tunisia against a British attack. De Lattre was determined to resist on the frontier, fearing that a fighting withdrawal might lead to the Germans and Italians occupying Vichy France; Juin, a native of North Africa, was more concerned with the security of Algeria. De Lattre may have also hoped that he would have been appointed head of the French forces in North Africa instead of Juin. Nonetheless Juin recommended de Lattre for promotion. He was promoted to général de corps d'armée on 2 January 1942, but Weygand had been recalled to France in October 1941, and on 2 February 1942 de Lattre was also recalled.

Returning to France, de Lattre took charge of the 16th Military Division, based in Montpellier. The post was a backwater, and one usually held by an officer of lower rank. Following the Allied landings in French North Africa on 8 November 1942, German and Italian troops occupied southern France and disbanded the Vichy Army. De Lattre received orders from Vichy that troops were to remain in their barracks, which he decided to disobey, instead carrying out a previously prepared plan to resist the German occupation. Staff officers informed de Lattre's superior in Avignon of his intentions. The troops did not move, and the Vichy Minister of War, Eugène Bridoux, ordered de Lattre's arrest. He was brought before a special State Tribunal on 9 January 1943, charged with treason and abandoning his post. The former charge was dropped but he was found guilty of the latter and was sentenced to ten years' imprisonment.

De Lattre was initially held at Montluc prison, but was later transferred to Riom. Simonne secured accommodation where the garden adjoined the prison wall and worked with de Lattre's driver, Louis Roetsch, and accomplices inside the prison to plan an escape. They managed to smuggle in tools, including a hammer, screwdriver and gimlet, along with paint, a paintbrush, putty and a rope. De Lattre had noticed that the sentry underneath his window went to wake up his relief in the middle of the night instead of being relieved in place, leaving the window unguarded for up to ten minutes. He also found that with one of the bars on his window removed he was able to squeeze through. On the night of 1 September 1943 he removed the window frame and one bar, squeezed through, and used the rope to descend, although it proved to be several feet too short. Bernard threw a rope ladder over the prison wall, allowing de Lattre to scale it. They then departed in two cars that Roetsch provided, along with false papers identifying de Lattre as Charles Dequenne, his headquarters clerk who had been killed in the fighting in June 1940. They hid on a farm near Compains until 1 October, when some of his prison break accomplices were arrested. De Lattre then made his way to a field near Pont-de-Vaux, whence he and others, including Eugène Claudius-Petit, were whisked away by a British aircraft and taken to London. Simonne and Bernard moved to Paris, where they lived under false names.

=== Operation Dragoon ===
De Lattre was promoted to the rank of général d'armée by Général de brigade Charles de Gaulle on 11 November 1943. Problems with his damaged lung led to de Lattre being admitted to Middlesex Hospital. He was discharged from hospital on 11 December, and on 19 December he flew from Glasgow Prestwick Airport to Algiers, where he met with de Gaulle. He then went to see the Commander-in-Chief of the French forces in North Africa, Général d'Armée Henri Giraud. On 26 December, Giraud appointed him the commander of the Second Army, which was renamed Army B on 23 January 1944. This put him in change of all the forces in North Africa being re-equipped by the Americans. Army B was as an amalgam of Free French forces, the Army of Africa forces and volunteers, with a strength of 256,000, including 5,000 women of the AFAT (auxiliaire féminine de l'armée de terre – Women's Auxiliary Army). In the first half of 1944 over 100,000 personnel departed for Italy, where they formed the French Expeditionary Corps (CEF) under Juin's command. This left de Lattre with just three divisions. Once again, he opened a cadre training centre, this time at Douéra in Algiers. His manner at this time gave rise to the sobriquet Le Roi Jean (King John).

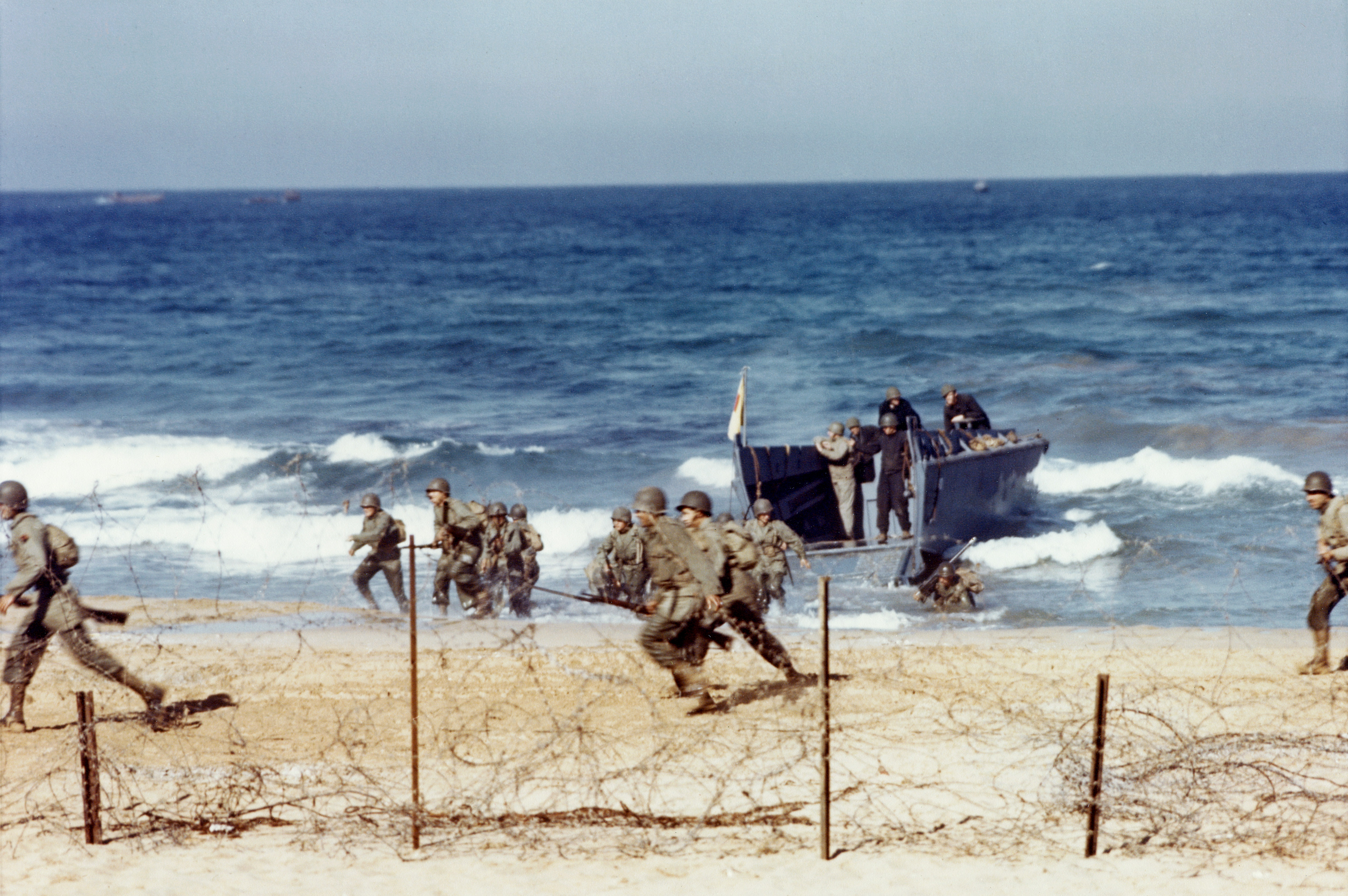
French Foreign Legion troops with US weapons, uniforms and equipment land on a North African beach during amphibious exercises.

On 17 April 1944, de Gaulle informed General Sir Henry Maitland Wilson's Allied Force Headquarters (AFHQ) in Algiers that de Lattre would be in command of all French forces participating in Operation Anvil, the projected Allied landings in Southern France. He was also placed in charge of Operation Brassard, the invasion of Elba. This involved landing a force of about 12,000 under Général de brigade Joseph Magnan, and largely drawn from his 9th Colonial Infantry Division on Corsica. Increases in the size of the German garrison, a need to provide more amphibious warfare training for the assault troops, and a desire to minimise casualties and maximise the chance of success led to de Lattre securing a postponement of the operation from 25 May to 17 June. The rapid advance of the Allied forces, which captured Rome on 5 June, caused the need for the operation to be questioned, but the Germans showed no sign of immediately withdrawing from the area north of Rome, nor from Elba. Operation Brassard therefore went ahead, although Wilson cancelled the planned parachute assault by the 1st Parachute Chasseur Regiment, as the required transport aircraft were committed to the Italian campaign. Operation Brassard was successful, liberating the island in two days of hard fighting between 17 and 19 June.

As commander of Army B, de Lattre assisted in the preparations for Operation Anvil, which was renamed Operation Dragoon on 1 August 1944. He was successful in securing Allied agreement for an independent French command, although the II Corps, under Général de corps d'armée Edgard de Larminat, would operate as part of American Lieutenant General Alexander Patch's US Seventh Army in the initial stages, as would Army B until the American Sixth United States Army Group, under Lieutenant General Jacob L. Devers, became active. Juin handed over command of the CEF in Italy to de Lattre on 23 July, and its headquarters was absorbed into that of Army B, with Juin's chief of staff, General de brigade Marcel Carpentier, becoming de Lattre's. De Lattre embarked for France from Taranto on a Polish liner, the MS Batory. Accompanying him was Bernard. Fearing that at age sixteen he would soon become eligible for forced labour in Germany, Simmone and Bernard had fled to Algiers via Spain. Bernard was then sent to Douera for training, becoming one of the youngest soldiers in de Lattre's army.

The Operation Dragoon landings commenced on 15 August, and de Lattre came ashore the following evening. The American advance had proceeded faster than anticipated, and the 9e division d'infanterie coloniale to arrive early. In a characteristically aggressive move, de Lattre moved immediately on Toulon and Marseille in the hope that they could be secured before the Germans could organise their defence. He sent General de division Joseph de Goislard de Monsabert's 3rd Algerian Infantry Division to encircle Toulon while General de brigade Diego Brosset's 1st Motorised Infantry Division attacked along the coast and Magnan's 9th Colonial Infantry Division, which had been landed early, attacked in the middle. Toulon was encircled on 21 August, and the port was taken by the 9th Colonial Infantry Division five days later. Meanwhile, de Lattre had already moved on Marseille, which was reached by General de brigade Aimé Sudre's Combat Command 1 of the 1st Armoured Division on 21 August. De Lattre had not intended to rush the city, but Sudre's arrival sparked a popular uprising, enabling Combat Command 1 to reach the old port. The progress of operations against Toulon allowed de Lattre to release the 3rd Algerian Infantry Division to participate in the Battle of Marseille. The German garrison surrendered on 28 August, and a thanksgiving ceremony was held at Notre-Dame de la Garde the following day.

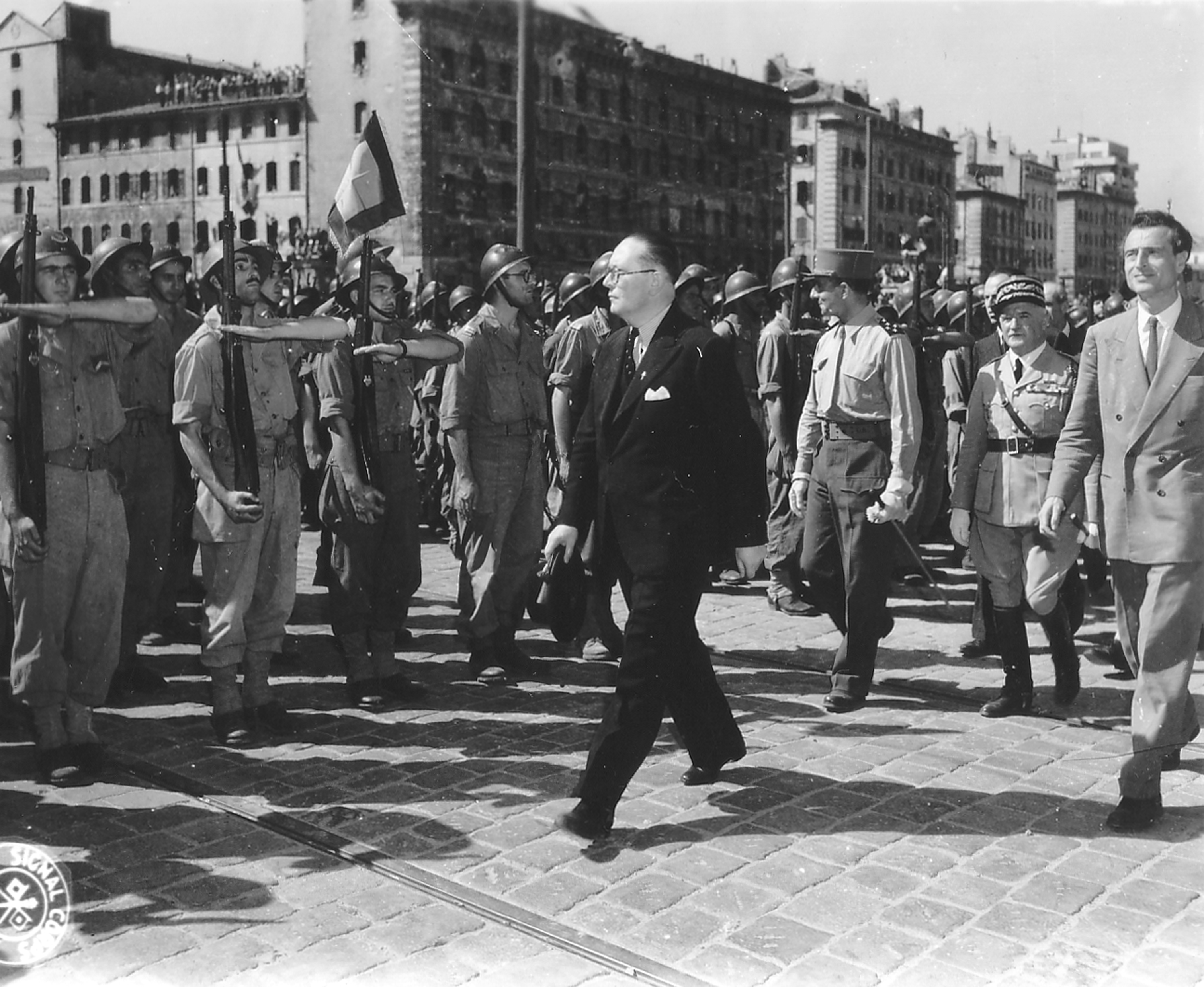
André Diethelm reviews the troops in Marseille on 29 August 1944. De Lattre walks behind him in dark pants and shirt without jacket

Lyon was taken by the 1st Motorised Infantry Division on 3 September, and on 12 September contact was made with Général de division Philippe Leclerc de Hauteclocque's 2nd Armoured Division, which had come from Normandy. This allowed Army B to officially become the French 1st Army on 25 September 1944. As summer turned to autumn and units moved into higher altitudes and latitudes of the Vosges, many of them still wearing summer uniforms, the troops began to feel the cold. This was especially true of the Army of Africa and Colonial Army units that made up the bulk of de Lattre's forces, which had come from warmer climates. Many of them had been fighting in Italy since early in the year, and had become exhausted by the rapid advance up the Rhône Valley. Equipment wore out even faster, and the French logistical system was stretched to its limit just to provide the army with its daily requirements of food, fuel and ammunition. On occasion they encountered an apathetic local population, and what de Lattre regarded as a dangerous sentiment arose among the North African troops that the French people should be making a bigger contribution.

De Lattre sought to address this by incorporating units of the French Forces of the Interior (FFI) into the Army, which would enable him to replace his losses and relieve the burden on African units of his Army. The French authorities were eager to bring the estimated 200,000 armed men of the FFI under control as soon as possible, but this was no easy task; the soldiers were suspicious of the discipline and reliability of FFI units, and resented the ranks and titles its leaders had accorded themselves. The FFI were also suspicious of the army, but by the end of the year 137,000 had enlisted in the French Army for the duration of the war. Uniforms and equipment had to be provided by the Americans, but while they agreed to equip security battalions and five regiments to replace North African ones, they were reluctant to provide equipment for the activation of new divisions. Eventually they relented, and among the reactivated divisions in February 1945 was de Lattre's old command, the 14th Infantry Division. Once agan, he opened a training centre, this time at Rouffach near Colmar.

=== Final campaigns ===
The Americans envisaged a passive role for the First Army in view of its logistical difficulties, but de Lattre pressed for a more active role. A combination of stubborn German resistance and bad weather brought operations in Alsace to a halt in October. On the eve of the resumption of his offensive in November, de Lattre learned that the Provisional Government wanted to take the 1st Armoured Division and 1st Infantry Division from him for an operation to clear German forces from the Royan pocket on the Gironde Estuary and reopen the port of Bordeaux. De Lattre appealed to Devers, who agreed to seek a postponement of the Bordeaux operation. He ultimately managed to get it postponed until April 1945. De Lattre's attack went ahead on 14 November. Belfort was taken on 25 November, but his attempt at encircling the German forces did not cut off any many as he hoped, although 17,000 prisoners were taken.

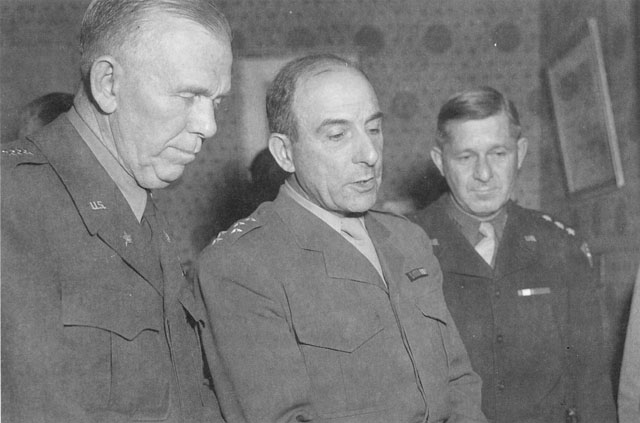
De Lattre with American General George C. Marshall (left) and Lieutenant General Jacob L. Devers (right), October 1944

In December, the Battle of the Bulge briefly halted the Allied advance, and for a while it seemed they would have to abandon Alsace and Strasbourg. This was not a politically feasible option for de Gaulle, especially since Strasbourg had so recently been liberated. De Lattre assumed responsibility for the defence of Strasbourg on 5 January; he had already acted to save it on his own initiative and contrary to his orders. Despite heavy pressure from the advancing German forces, which came within 10 miles (16 km) of the city, he managed to hold it. The German offensive was finally halted by the US VI Corps in the north and the 1st Motorised Division in the south. De Lattre then moved to eliminate the Colmar Pocket. For this operation, Devers placed the four US divisions of Major General Frank W. Milburn's US XXI Corps under de Lattre's command. Colmar was liberated on 2 February 1945. On 11 February, de Gaulle visited the city and invested de Lattre with the Grand Cross of the Legion of Honour.

The First Army breached the Siegfried Line on 19 March 1945. On 31 March 1945, it crossed the Rhine at Speyer and Germersheim and advanced through the Black Forest to Karlsruhe and Stuttgart. The Danube was crossed on 22 April. Ulm lay 40 miles (64 km) outside the First Army's zone, but meant a great deal to French people as the site of Napoleon's victory in the Battle of Ulm in 1805. On the way, they passed through Sigmaringen, to whence the heads of the Vichy government had fled in August 1944 to establish a government in exile in Germany, although de Lattre's forces did not reach it in time to capture Pétain or Pierre Laval. Ulm was taken by American and French units on 24 April, and they raised the tricolour over the city's old fort, as Napoleon had done. Devers ordered de Lattre to withdraw from the city, and with the mission accomplished, this was done. In a tribute to de Lattre on 13 May, Devers quipped: "For many months we have fought together – often on the same side."

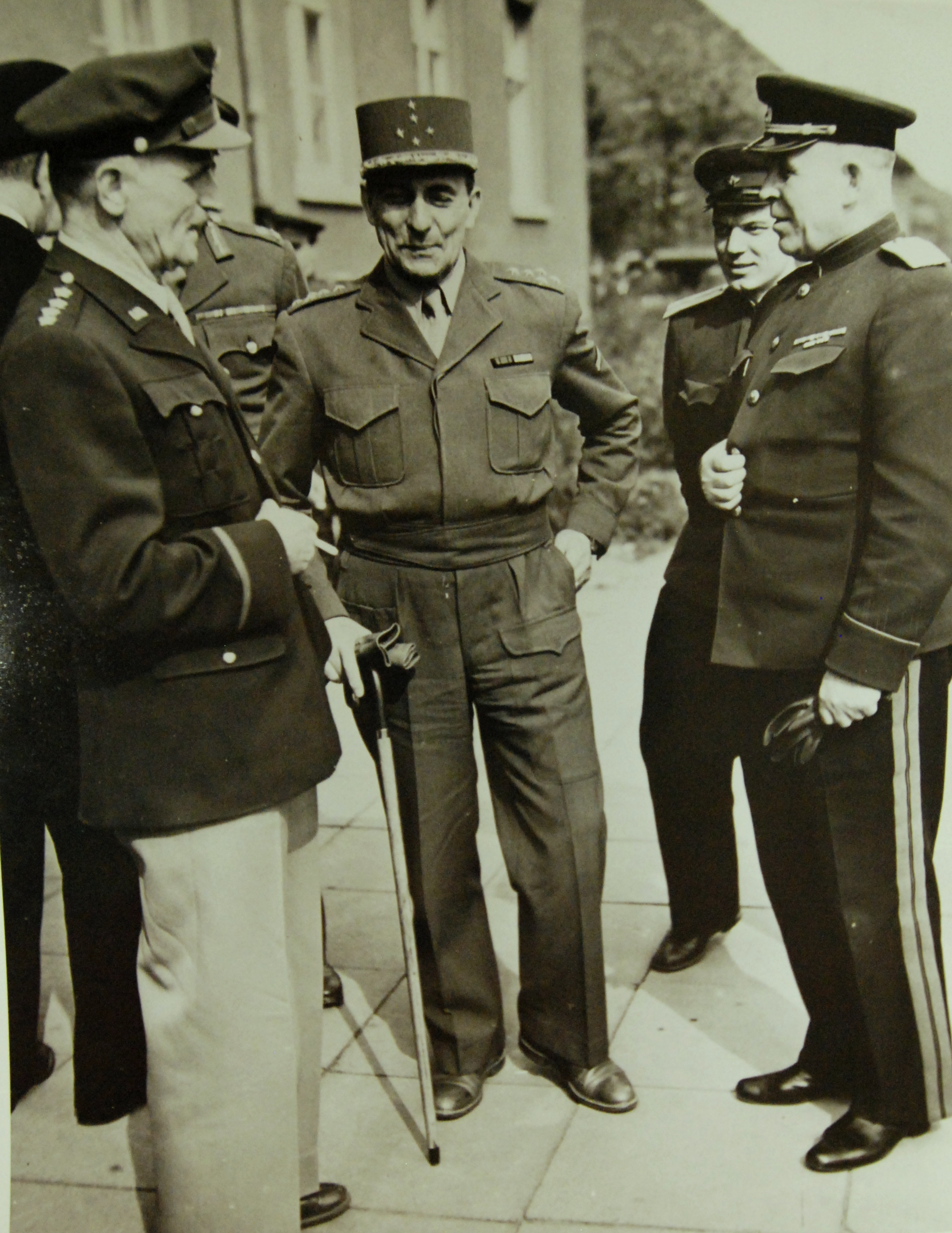
From left to right: Carl Spaatz, de Lattre and Ivan Susloparov in front of the SHAEF building in Reims, 7 May 1945

On 8 May 1945, de Lattre flew to Berlin, where he went to headquarters of Marshal of the Soviet Union Georgy Zhukov for the official German surrender ceremony. Already there was Air Chief Marshal Sir Arthur Tedder, General Carl Spaatz and Admiral Sir Harold Burrough. No preparations had been made for a French representative, but some Russian women improvised a tricolour from a flag of Nazi Germany, a white bed sheet and blue mechanic's boiler suit. Tedder championed de Lattre's right to sign the document as the French representative, and as a compromise it was signed by Zhukov and Spaatz with Tedder and de Lattre as witnesses. On the nine copies that Zhukov signed first de Lattre was first witness while Tedder signed as first witness on the nine that Spaatz signed first.

On 15 June, de Lattre attended the first meeting of the Allied Control Council. The First Army was dissolved on 24 July, and he succeeded as Commander in Chief of the French Army of Occupation by Général de Corps d'Armée Marie-Pierre Koenig three days later. On 4 August 1945 de Lattre departed. Colour parties from each of the regiments of the First Army were drawn up along the banks of the Rhine at Kehl, and he saluted each one in turn.

== Postwar ==
In July 1945, de Lattre was offered the position of Inspector General of the Army an honorific position he regarded as beneath the status that he had earned as commander of the First Army. He declined and asked to be retired instead. De Gaulle then offered to combine the position with that of the Chief of Staff of the French Army, and de Lattre accepted, assuming the post on 29 November 1945. His task was demobilising the wartime army and building a new one. Most of the officer corps had spent the war since 1940 in prisoner of war camps in Germany, and their training was out of date. To build a force that was both democratic and national, he resolved to create a conscript army rather than a professional one. To prepare the 1946 conscripts, de Lattre opened a dozen new training centres modelled on those he had created during the war at Opme, Douera and Rouffach, where they would be schooled in citizenship. To address the shortage of instructors, he devised a system whereby the national servicemen would train themselves. Careers in the post-war army would be open to the best regardless of their social status. In his personal selection, though, de Lattre tended to favour those who had served with the First Army.

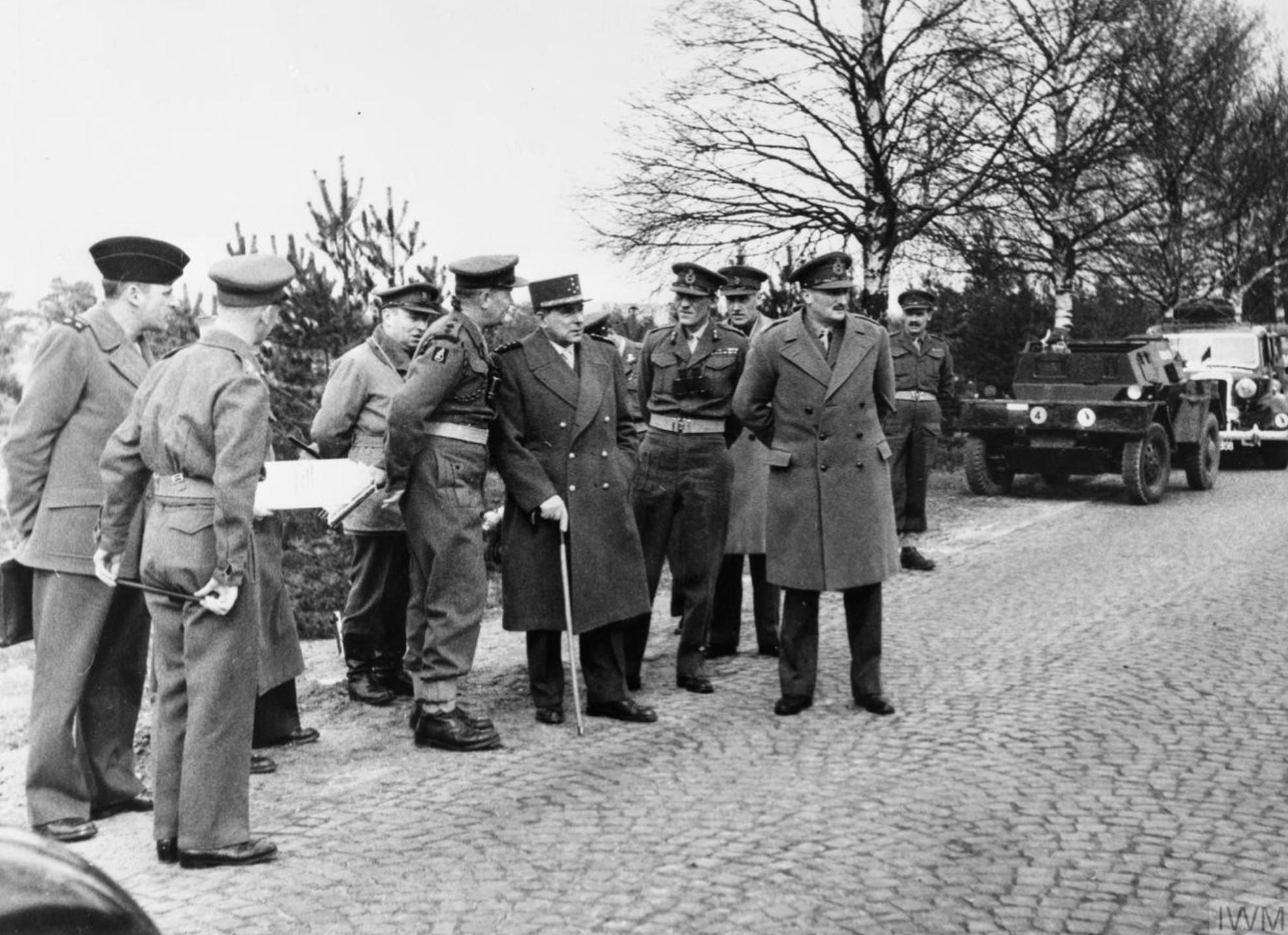
De Lattre (in képi) and senior British Army officers observe a NATO exercise in Germany, c. 1950

De Lattre was abruptly relieved of his responsibilities as Chief of Staff in March 1947, although he remained Inspector General, and was elevated to Inspector General of the Armed Forces in the spring of 1948, and on 2 June 1948 he was made vice president of the Conseil supérieur de la guerre, positions which had little authority in peacetime. From September to November 1947, he led a diplomatic and economic mission to South America where he held numerous talks with presidents from Argentina, Chile, Uruguay, and Brazil and high-ranking ministers, including French communities there. He also took part in several related economic and diplomatic conferences.

From 4 October 1948 to 13 December 1950, de Lattre was the first commander-in-chief of Western Union Defence Organisation ground forces in Western Europe. While in that post he often came into conflict with British Field Marshal Lord Montgomery, the Commander-in-Chief of the Western Union forces. The two clashed over many issues, the most important of which was whether the Allies were prepared to meet a Soviet attack on the Rhine, something Montgomery tried hard to get his government to accept. De Lattre insisted on speaking to Montgomery in French, although he had a good command of English. However, on the occasion of Montgomery's 63rd birthday in November 1950, Montgomery invited de Lattre to tea. Montgomery cut his birthday cake and gave de Lattre an extra slice for Bernard, who was then serving in French Indochina. What was a spontaneous gesture touched de Lattre deeply.

== Indochina ==
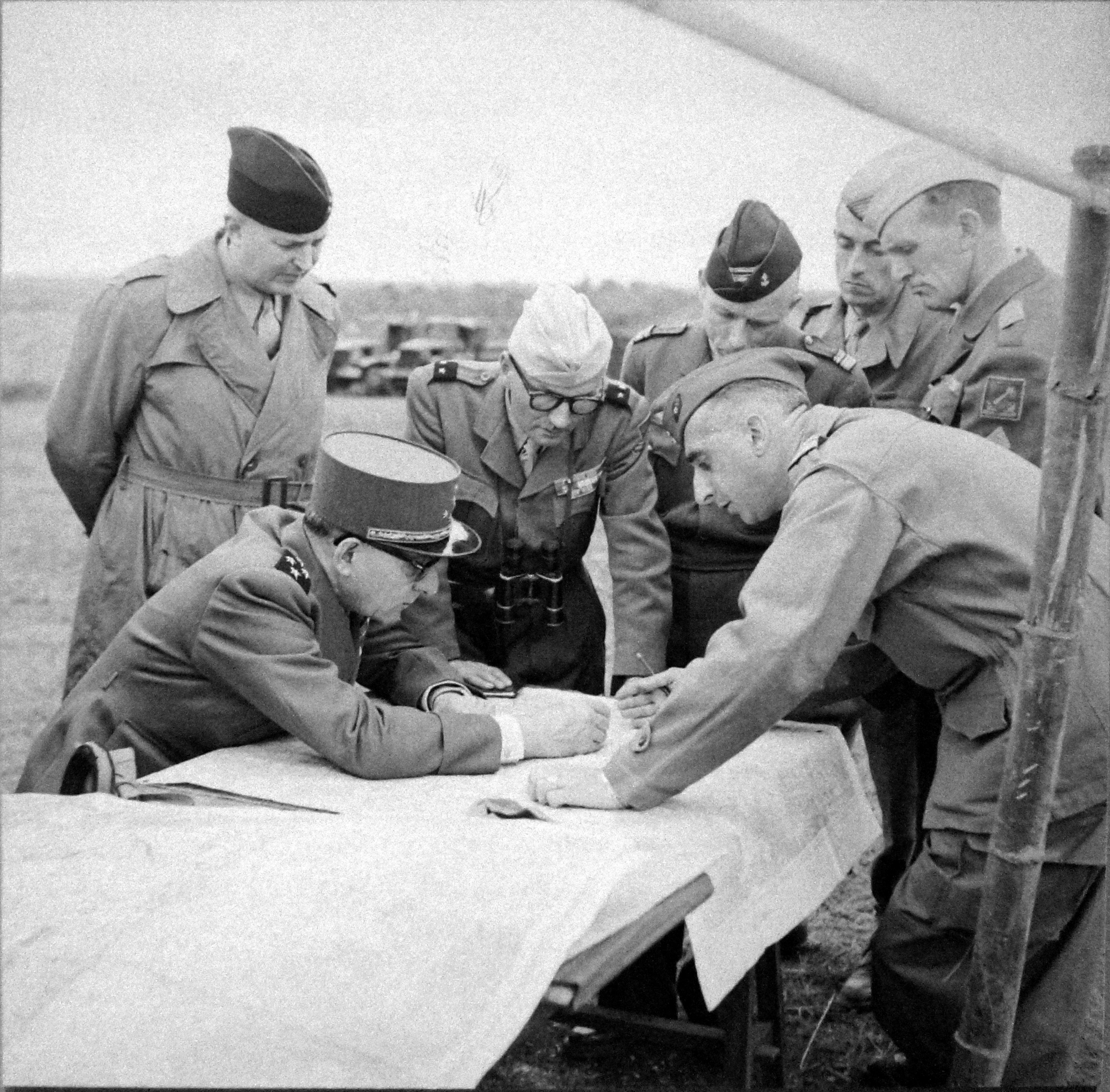
De lattre (in képi) with General de Castries (right) in Indochina

From December 1950 to November 1951, de Lattre commanded French troops in Indochina during the First Indochina War. He implemented scorched earth tactics in an effort to limit Việt Minh access to food and other supplies. French forces burned crops in areas of Việt Minh activity. These tactics increased the anger of the Vietnamese people against the French and were a strategic failure.

After de Lattre's arrival in Vietnam, Việt Minh General Giap proclaimed that his army would face "an adversary worthy of its steel". De Lattre's arrival raised the morale of French troops significantly and inspired his forces to inflict heavy defeats on the Việt Minh. He won three major victories at Vĩnh Yên, Mạo Khê and Yen Cu Ha and successfully defended the north of the country against the Việt Minh. At the Battle of Vĩnh Yên, he defeated 2 Việt Minh divisions, totalling 20,000 men under Giap's personal command. He personally took charge of the outnumbered French forces, flying in reinforcements and mustering every available aircraft for airstrikes against the massive Việt Minh formation. Giap retreated after three fierce days of combat that killed 6,000 and wounded 8,000. De Lattre had anticipated Giap's attacks and had reinforced French defences with hundreds of cement blockhouses and new airfields.

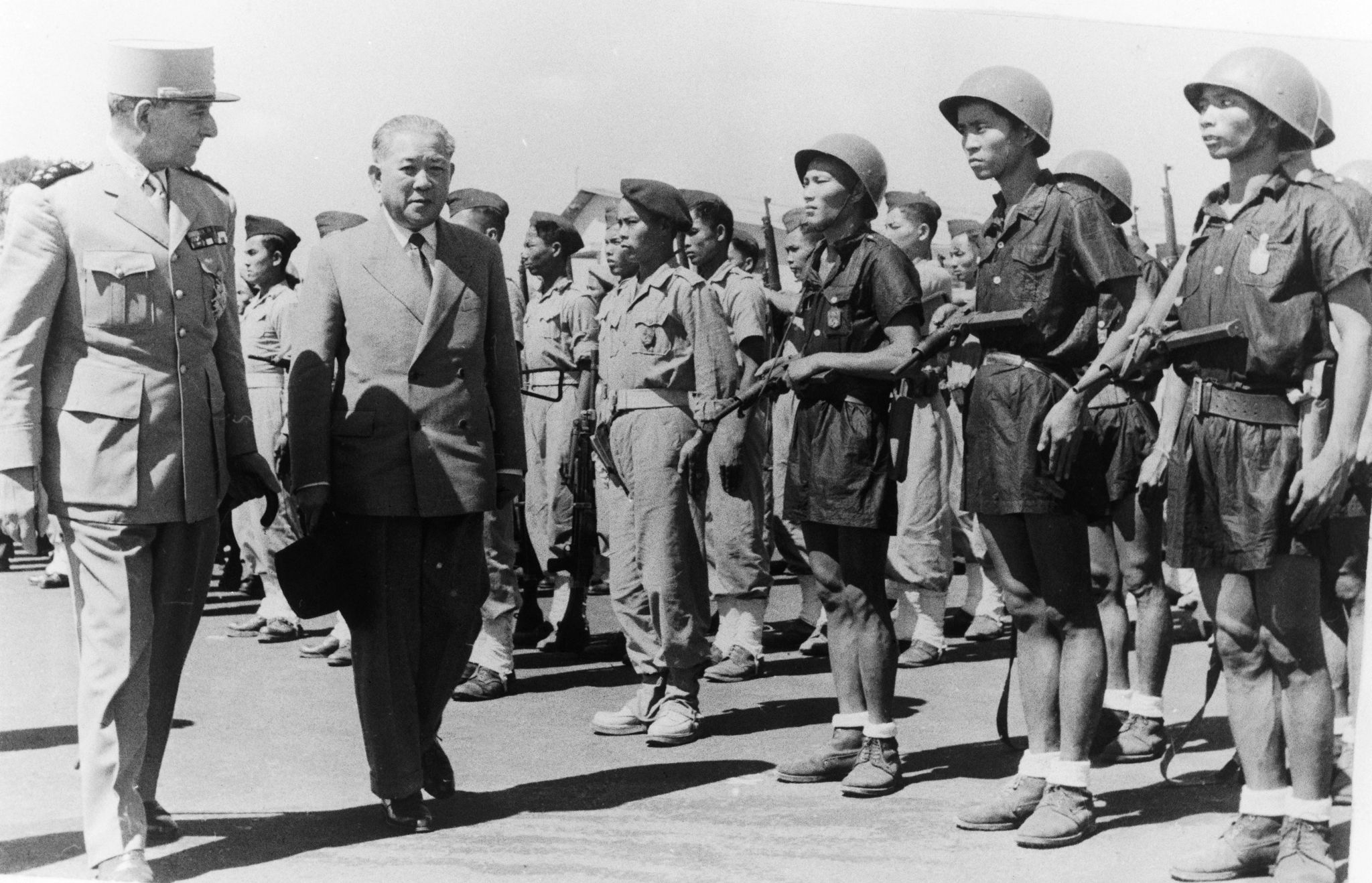
General de Lattre and Prime Minister Trần Văn Hữu reviewing VNA soldiers, January 1951

In March 1951, at the Battle of Mạo Khê near the port of Haiphong, de Lattre again defeated Giap, who had underestimated de Lattre's army's ability to deploy naval guns and to move reinforcements aboard assault boats on deep estuaries and canals. However, Bernard was killed in action in the Battle for Nam Định, in late May 1951. He had obeyed his father's orders to hold the town at all costs against three Việt Minh divisions. After three weeks of battle the French victory halted Giap's offensive in the Red River Delta. On 20 September 1951, de Lattre spoke at The Pentagon to request American aid and warned of the danger of the spread of communism throughout Southeast Asia if northern Vietnam fell completely to the Việt Minh. However, the United States was preoccupied with the Korean War. The US sent de Lattre some transport planes and trucks and other equipment: a "significant contribution" but "scarcely enough to turn the tide for France" in Vietnam.

He was highly regarded by both his French subordinates and Việt Minh adversaries and has been described as the "Gallic version of [General Douglas] MacArthur – handsome, stylish, sometimes charming, yet egocentric to the point of megalomania" and "brilliant and vain" and "flamboyant".

== Death ==
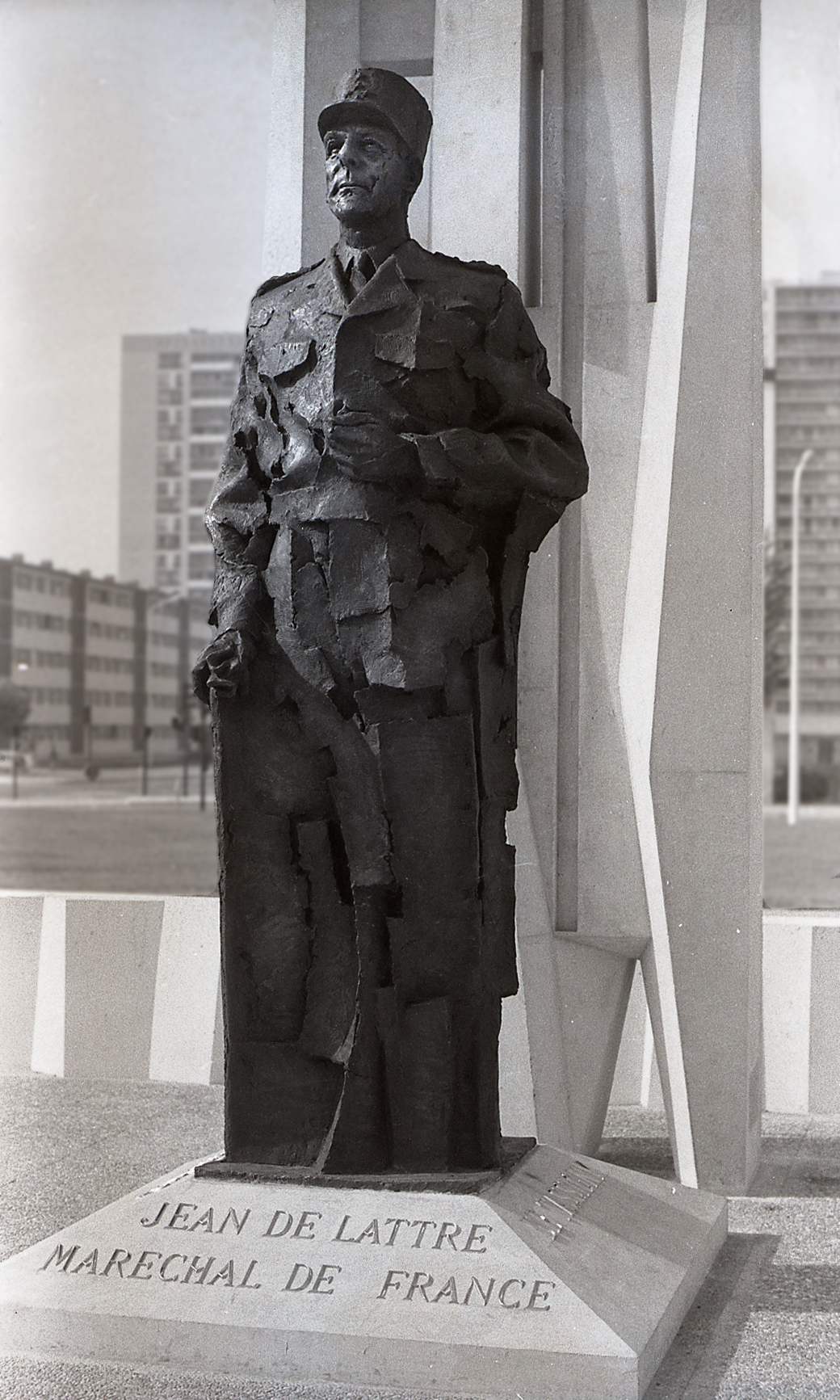
Statue of Marshal de Lattre de Tassigny in Mantes-la-Jolie

On 20 November 1951, illness forced de Lattre to return to Paris for medical treatment for prostate cancer. He entered the Clinique Maillot in Neuilly-sur-Seine on 18 December. His condition deteriorated in January. His last words before losing consciousness on 9 January were: "Where is Bernard?" He died on 11 January.

De Lattre was posthumously elevated to the dignity of Marshal of France by the President of France, Vincent Auriol, on the day of his funeral procession, 15 January 1952 at Notre-Dame de Paris, Les Invalides in presence of de Gaulle, Dwight D. Eisenhower, and Montgomery. He was buried in a state funeral lasting five days, in what Life magazine described as the "biggest military funeral France had seen since the death of Marshal Foch in 1929". His body was moved through the streets of Paris in a series of funeral processions, with the coffin lying in state at four separate locations: his home, the chapel at Les Invalides, the Arc de Triomphe and before Notre-Dame. Those marching in the funeral procession included members of the French cabinet, judges, bishops and Western military leaders. The route included the Rue de Rivoli and the Champs-Élysées.

The processions went from the Arc de Triomphe to Notre-Dame and then from Notre-Dame to Les Invalides. The stage of the journey from the Arc de Triomphe to Notre-Dame took place in the evening, and cavalrymen from the Garde républicaine flanked the coffin on horseback bearing flaming torches. Walking behind the soldiers marching in the funeral processions was the lone figure of the Marshal's widow, Simonne de Lattre de Tassigny, who was dressed in black and prayed as she walked. Thousands of people lined the funeral route, forming crowds that were ten-deep. The pageantry included the tolling of bells, and flags being flown at half-mast. The final stage of the funeral was a journey of 400 kilometres (250 mi) to his birthplace of Mouilleron-en-Pareds, in western France. There his 97-year-old father, Roger de Lattre, aged and blind, ran his hands over the ceremonial accoutrements on the coffin, which included the posthumously-awarded marshal's baton and his son's képi. The family line became extinct with his death. The coffin was lowered into the ground and the Marshal was laid to rest beside his only son, Bernard, who had been killed fighting under his father's command in Indochina about eight months earlier.

== Military ranks ==
Volunteer Private, 2nd class	Brigadier	Marshal of Lodgings	Aspirant	Second lieutenant
3 October 1908	10 February 1909	5 November 1909	5 May 1910	1 October 1910
Lieutenant	Captain	Battalion chief	Lieutenant colonel	Colonel
1 October 1912	4 April 1916	26 June 1926	24 March 1932	24 June 1935
Brigade general	Division general	Corps general	Army general	Marshal of France
20 March 1939	26 June 1941	2 January 1942	10 November 1943	15 January 1952 Posthumous

== Honours and decorations ==
De Lattre was awarded the following awards and decorations:

Honours and decorations
National honours
Ribbon bar	Name	Date	Source
	Grand Cross of the National Order of the Legion of Honour	10 February 1945	
	Grand Officer of the National Order of the Legion of Honour	12 July 1940	
	Commander of the National Order of the Legion of Honour	20 December 1935	
	Officer of the National Order of the Legion of Honour	16 June 1920	
	Knight of the National Order of the Legion of Honour	3 January 1915	
	Companion of the National Order of Liberation	24 September 1944	
Military decorations
Ribbon bar	Name	Date	Source
	Military medal	16 June 1920	
	War Cross 1914–1918 – Three palms, two silver-gilt stars, three bronze stars		
	War Cross 1939–1945 – Eight palms		
	War Cross for foreign operational theatres – Three palms		
	Colonial Medal – Clasp "Maroc"		
	Escapees' Medal		
	1914–1918 Inter-Allied Victory medal		
	1914–1918 Commemorative war medal		
	Military Health Service honour medal – Gold grade		
	Medal of Honor of Physical Education – Gold grade	1 April 1947	
Foreign honours
Ribbon bar	Name	Country	Source
	Knight Grand Cross of the Order of the Bath	United Kingdom	
	Military Cross	United Kingdom	
	Army Distinguished Service Medal	United States	
	Commander of the Legion of Merit	United States	
	Order of Suvorov – 1st class	Soviet Union	
	Grand Officer of the Order of Leopold – One palm	Belgium	
	War Cross – One palm	Belgium	
	War Cross	Czechoslovakia	
	Grand Cross of the Order of the White Lion	Czechoslovakia	
	Grand Cross of the Order of St Olav	Norway	
	Grand Cross of the Order of Orange-Nassau	Netherlands	
	Commander's Cross of the Order of Virtuti Militari – 16 July 1946	Poland	
	Cross of Grunwald – 1st class	Poland	
	Grand Cross of the Order of the Dannebrog	Denmark	
	Grand Cordon of the Nichan Iftikar	Tunisia	
	Grand Cross of the Order of Blood	Tunisia	
	Sherifian Order of Military Merit	Morocco	
	Grand Cross of the Order of Ouissam Alaouite	Morocco	
	Grand Cross of the Order of the Million Elephants and the White Parasol	Laos	
	Grand Cross of the Royal Order of Cambodia	Cambodia	
	Grand Cross of the National Order of Vietnam	Vietnam	
	Commander of the National Order of Merit	Brazil	
	Grand Cross of the Order of the Liberator General San Martín	Argentina	
	Order of Military Merit – White distinction	Cuba	
	Medal of Military Merit	Mexico	
	Grand Cross of the Order of Military Merit	Chile	
	Grand Cross of the Order of the Black Star	Benin	

=== Citations ===
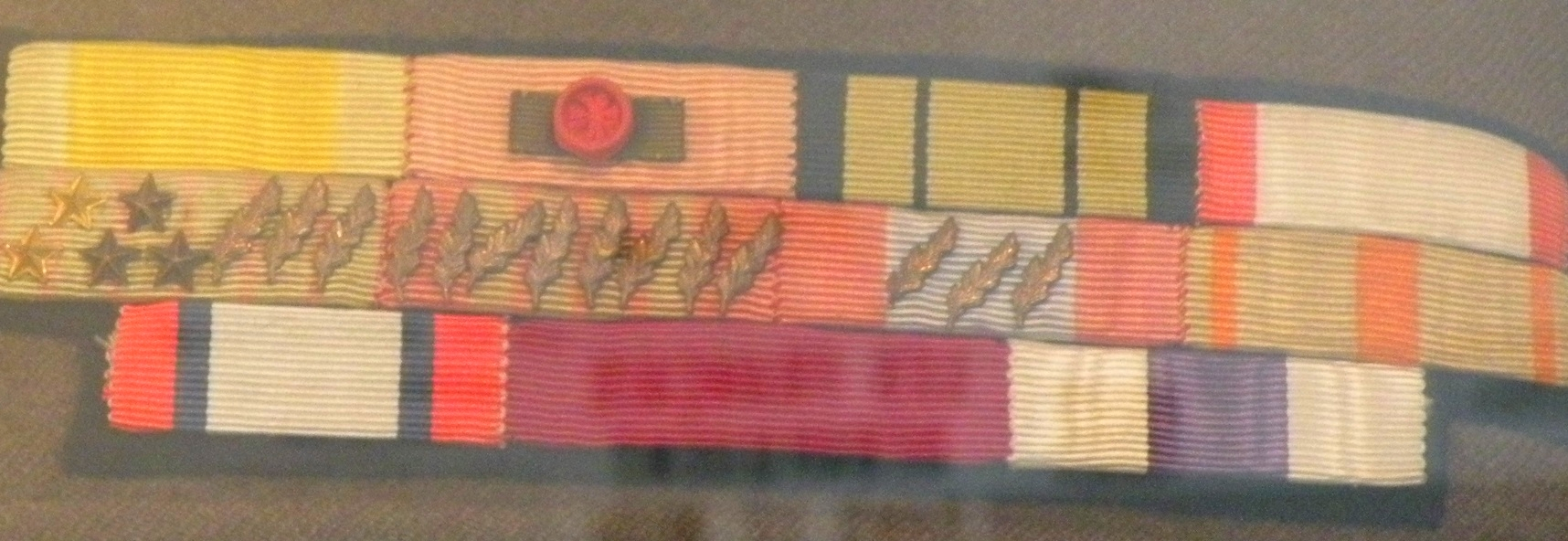
Military orders, awards and decorations of Général de Lattre de Tassigny preserved at the musée de l'Armée.

For his promotion to Grand Officer of the National Order of the Legion of Honour:

Young leading division commander. In the midst of the hard fights from 14 May to 4 June 1940, was by his valor as much as by the wisdom of his dispositions, one of the main elements of the recovery of the entire army of the Aisne. Rethel, where six times it rejected the enemy in the Aisne, will be inscribed on the flags and standards of the 14th division as a name of glory and victory.

— Journal Officiel de l'État français, 15 January 1941

For his promotion to Knight of the National Order of the Legion of Honour:

Performed several perilous reconnaissance with remarkable audacity and safety. First wounded on 11 August of a shrapnel during a reconnaissance. Sent on 14 September in reconnaissance, was wounded with a spear and cleared enemy riders who surrounded him by killing two of his hand.

— Journal Officiel de la République Française, 5 January 1915

== Legacy ==
An annual military service, involving serving soldiers, veteran associations, and ceremonial carriage of the Marshal's baton, takes place at the graves of his family in his birthplace, Mouilleron-en-Pareds.

Memorials and squares, boulevards, avenues and streets that bear his name
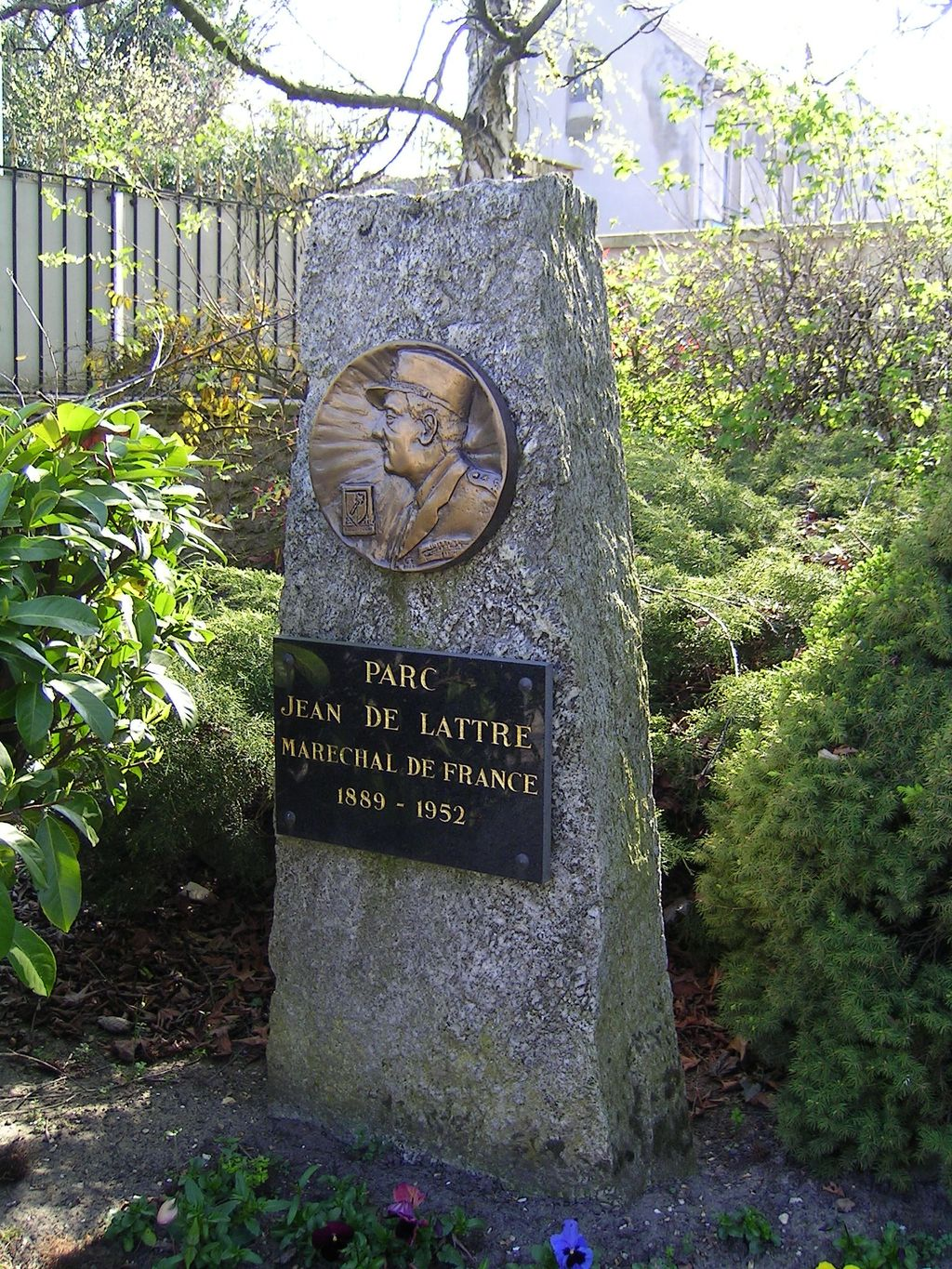
Statue de Jean De Lattre, parc de la Mairie

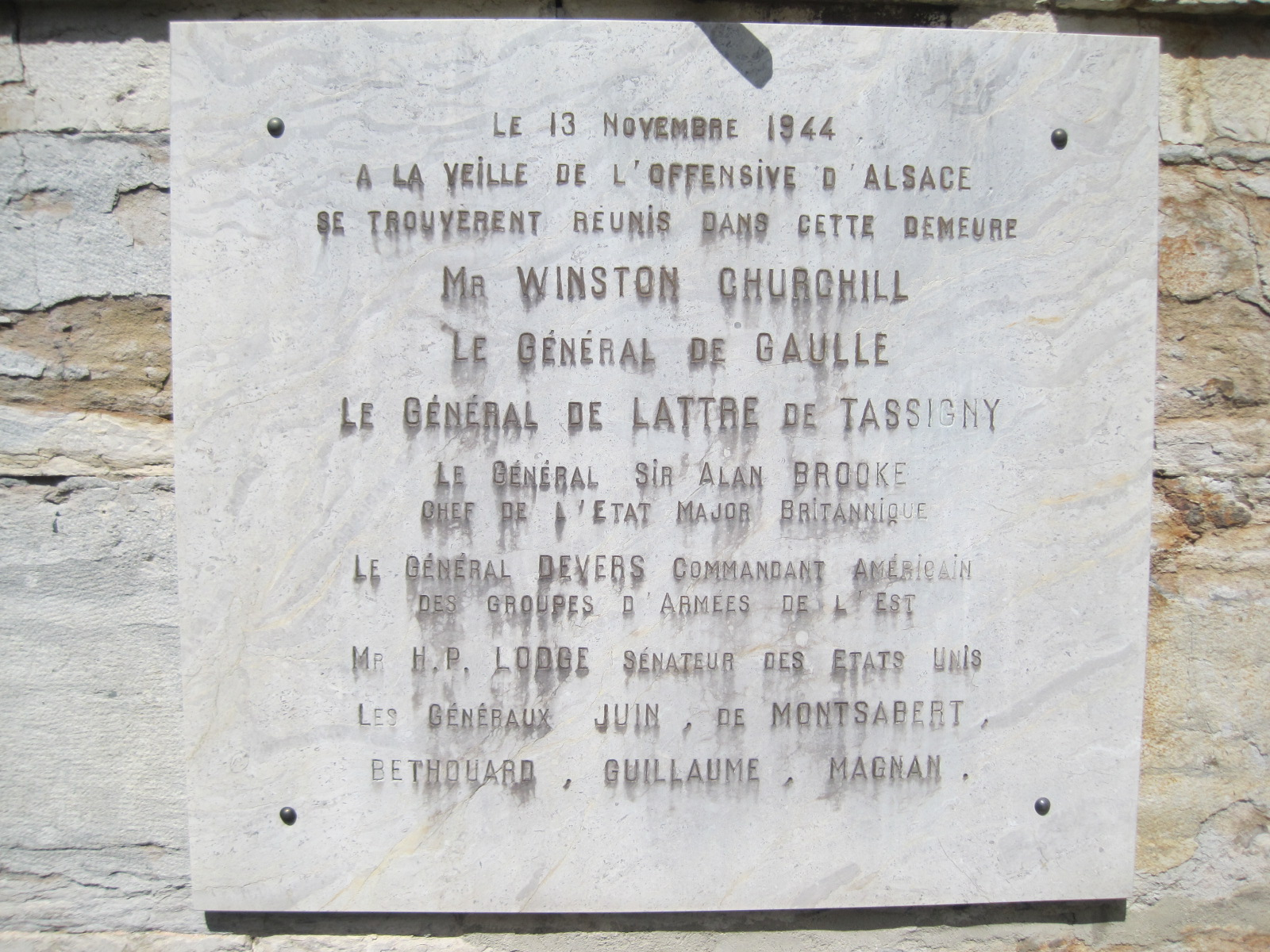
Château Montelambert – Maîche – Franche Comté – France

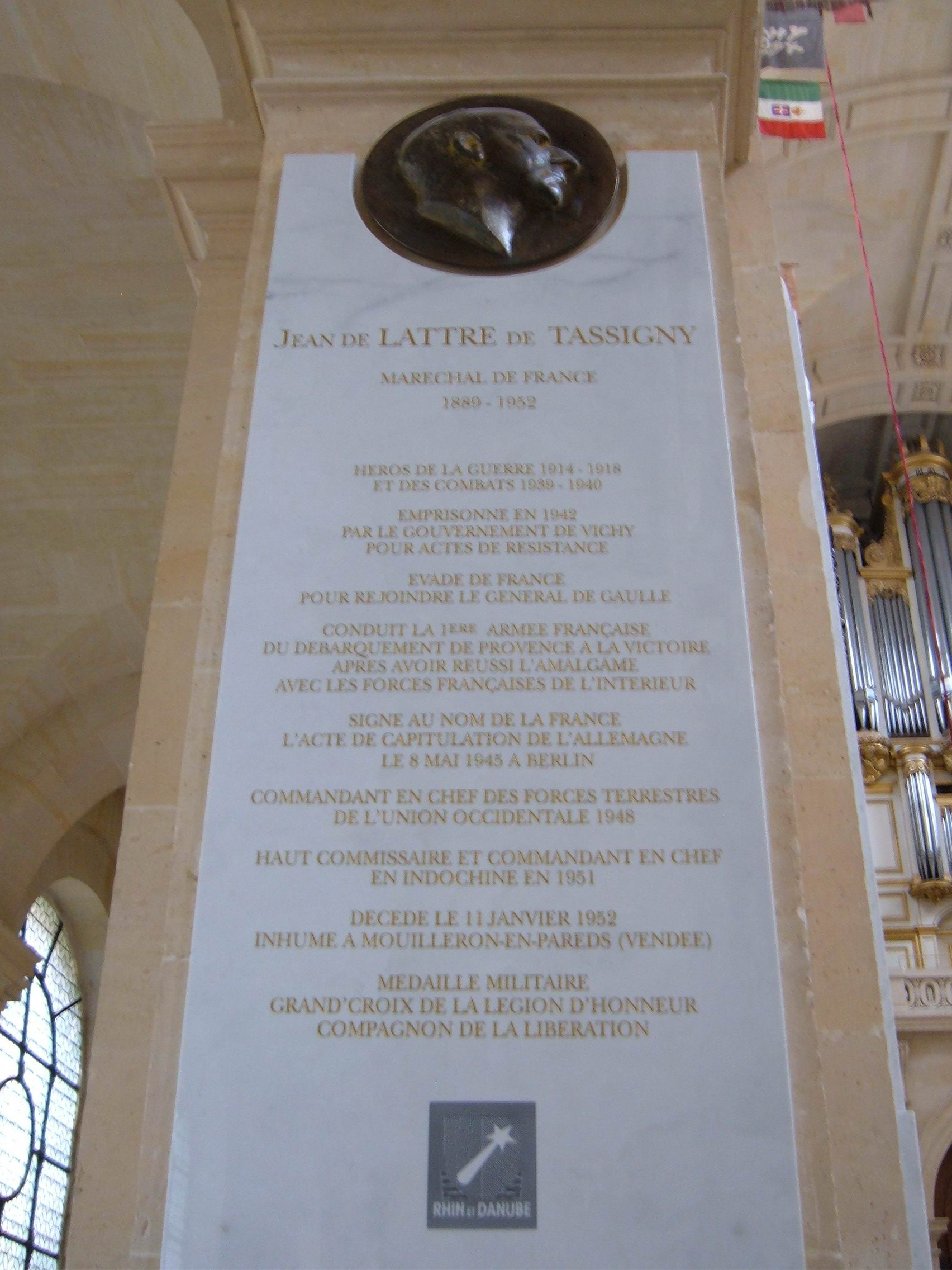
Memorial plaque at Saint-Louis-des-Invalides in Les Invalides

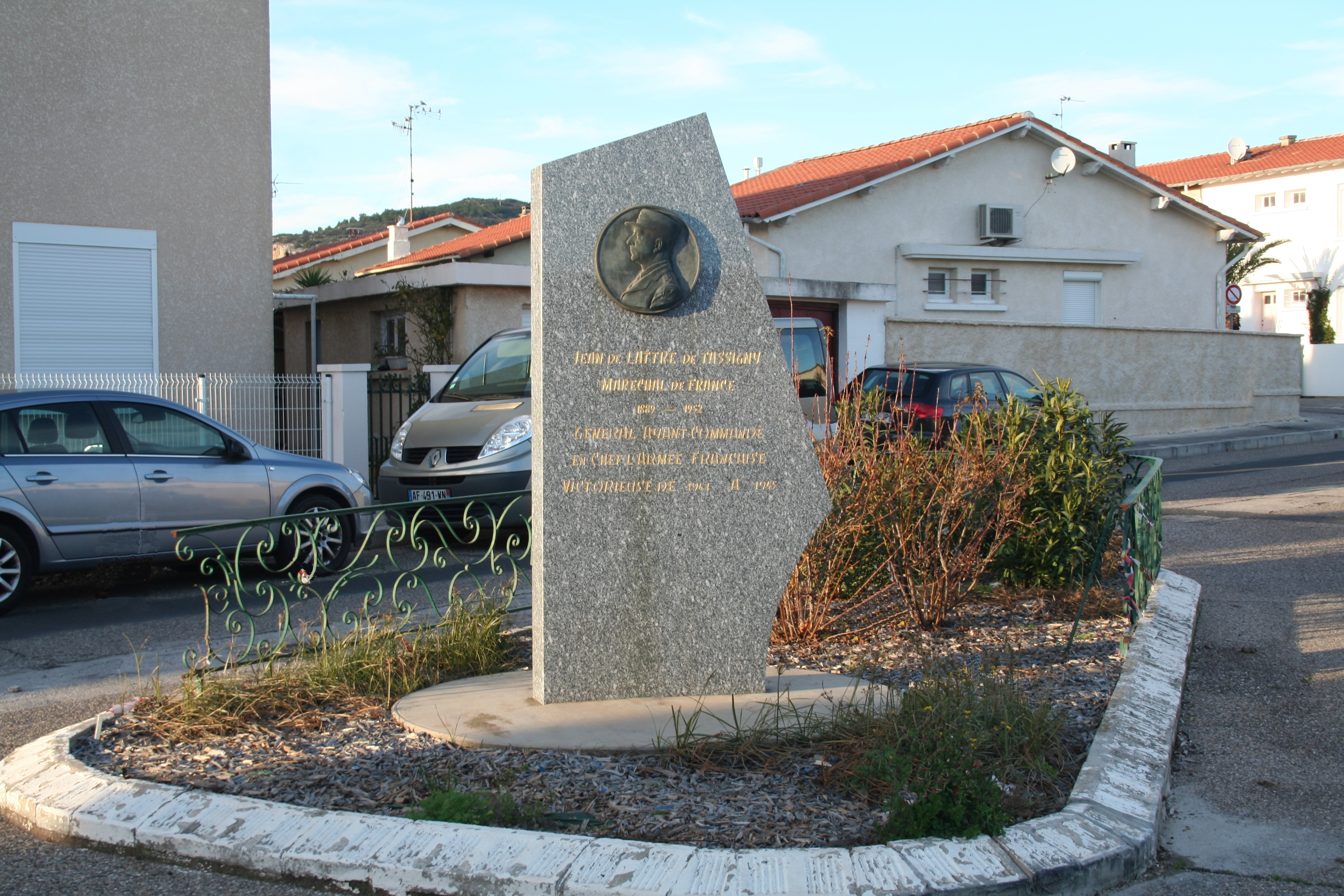
Frontignan memorial

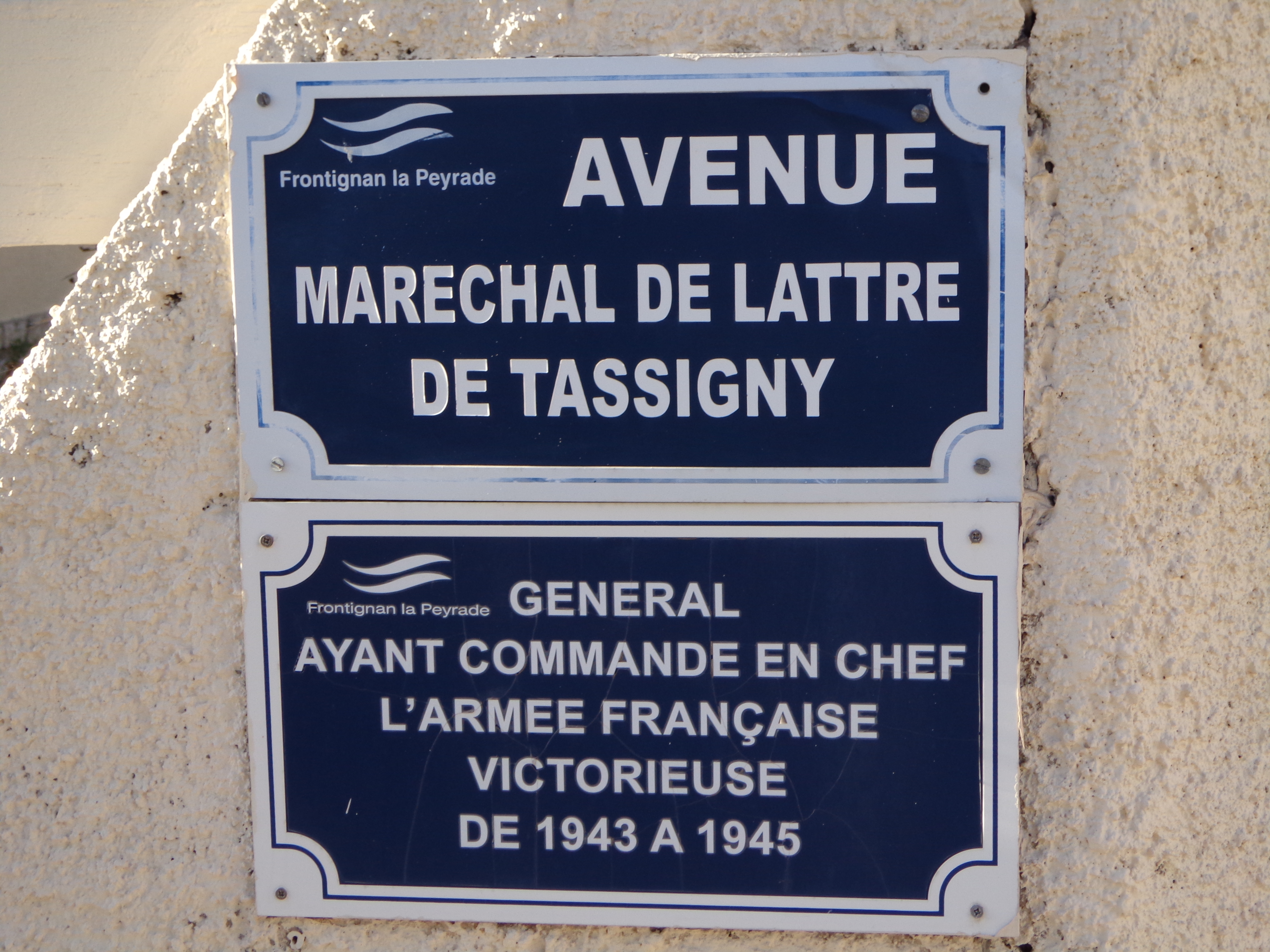
Avenue de Marechal de Lattre de Tassigny

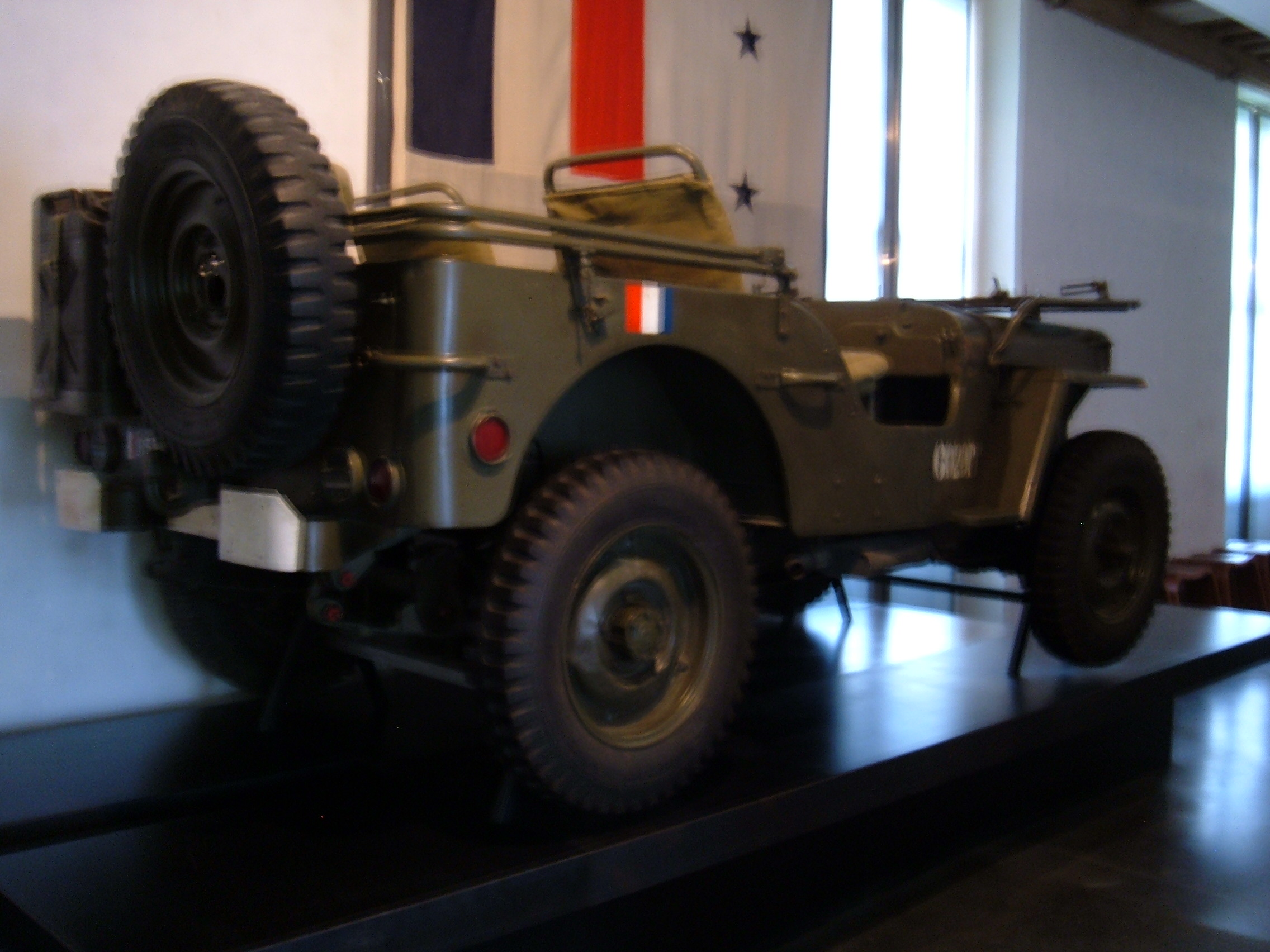
His jeep on display at the Musée de l'Armée in Paris

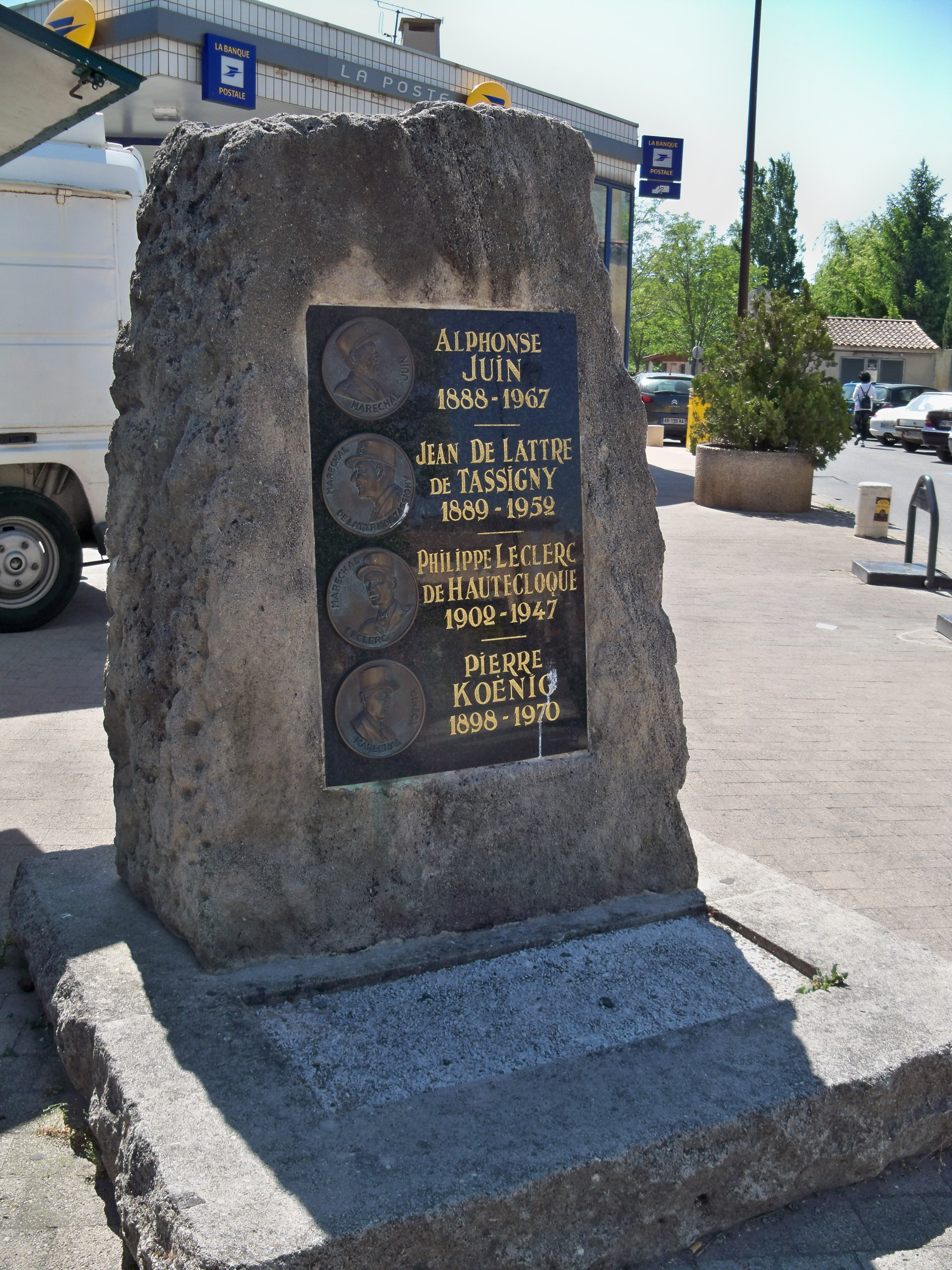
Memorial à L'Isle sur la Sorgue

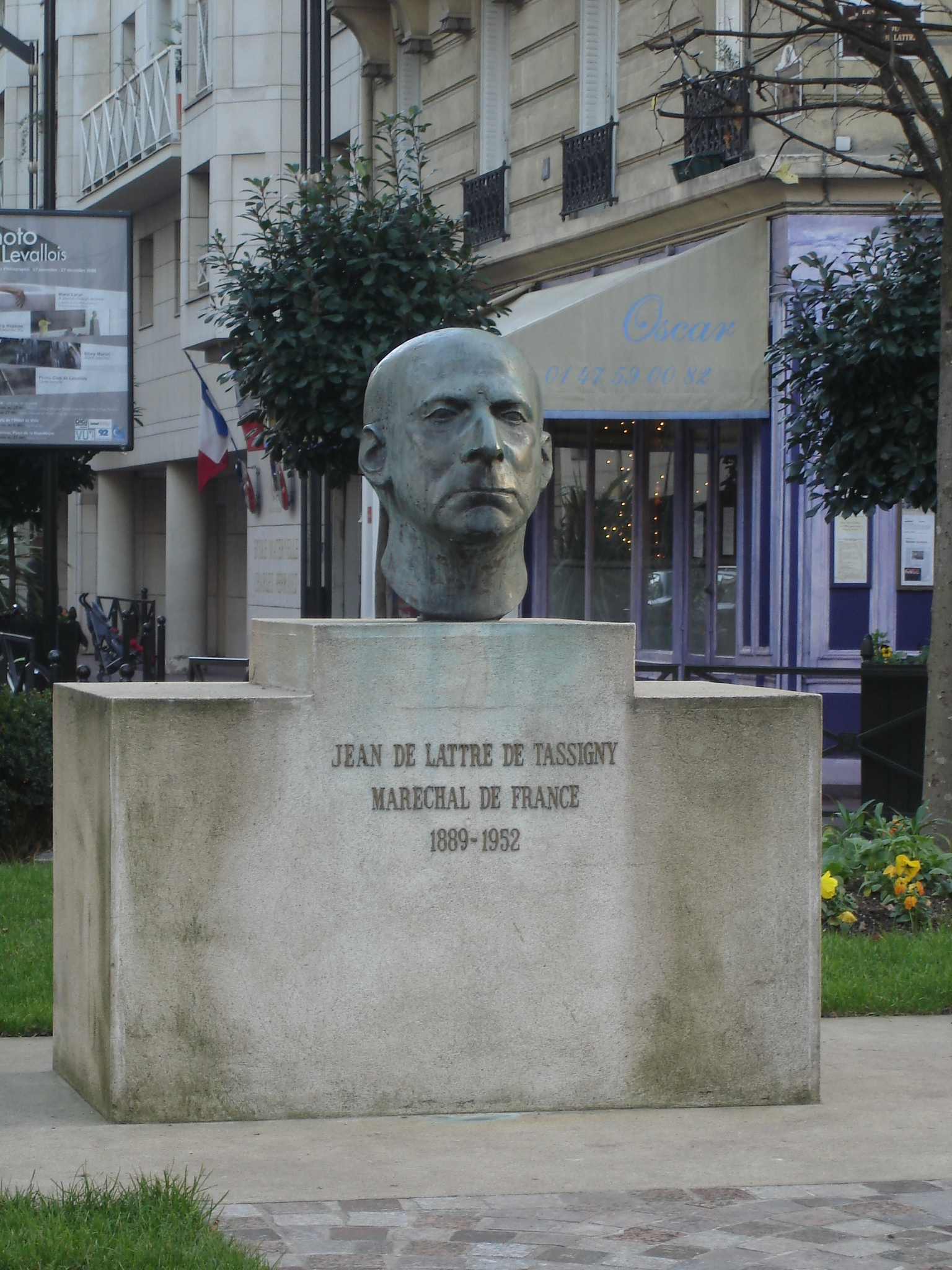
Place de Lattre de Tassigny in the Levallois-Perret suburb of Paris

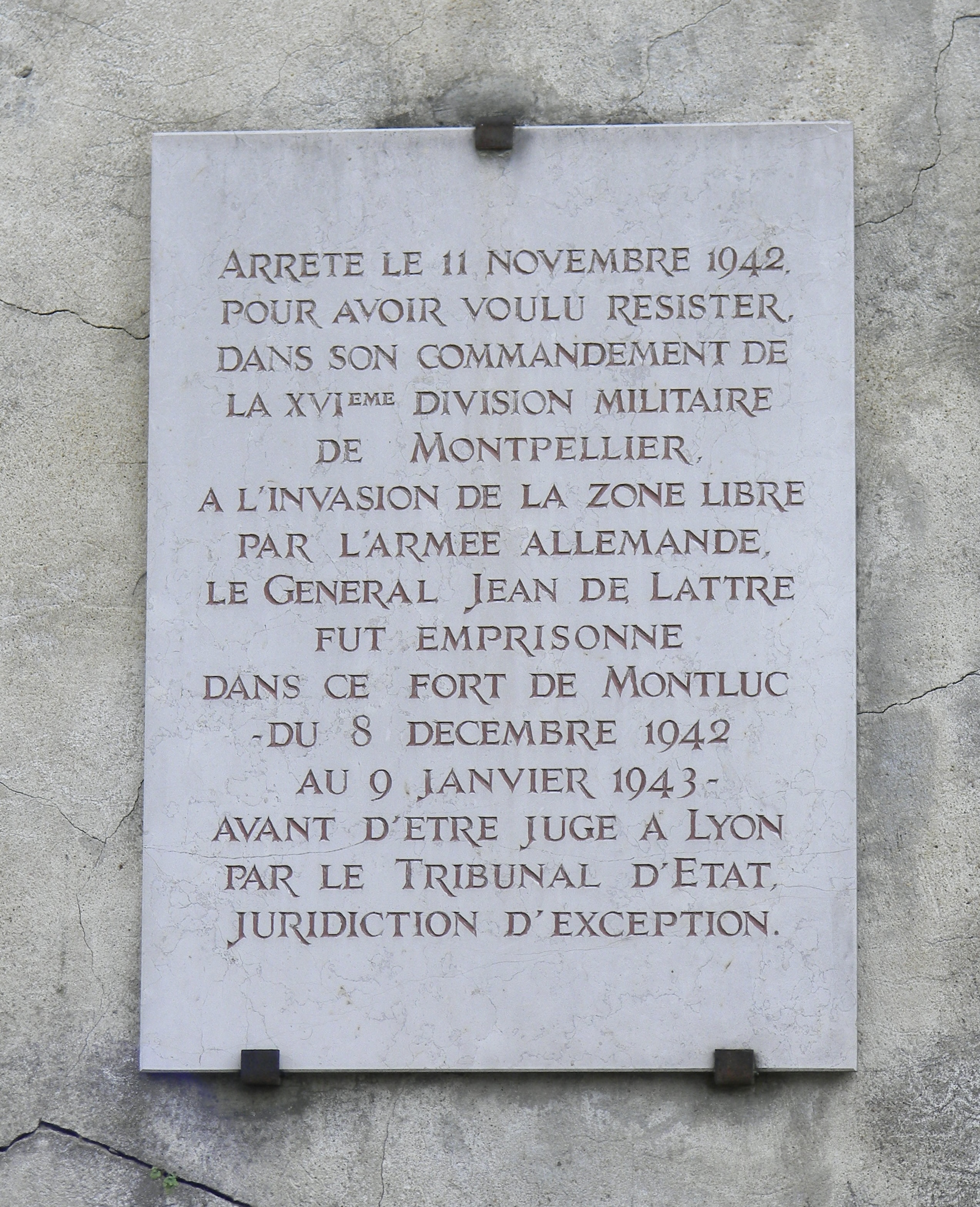
Plaque at Fort Montluc, Lyon

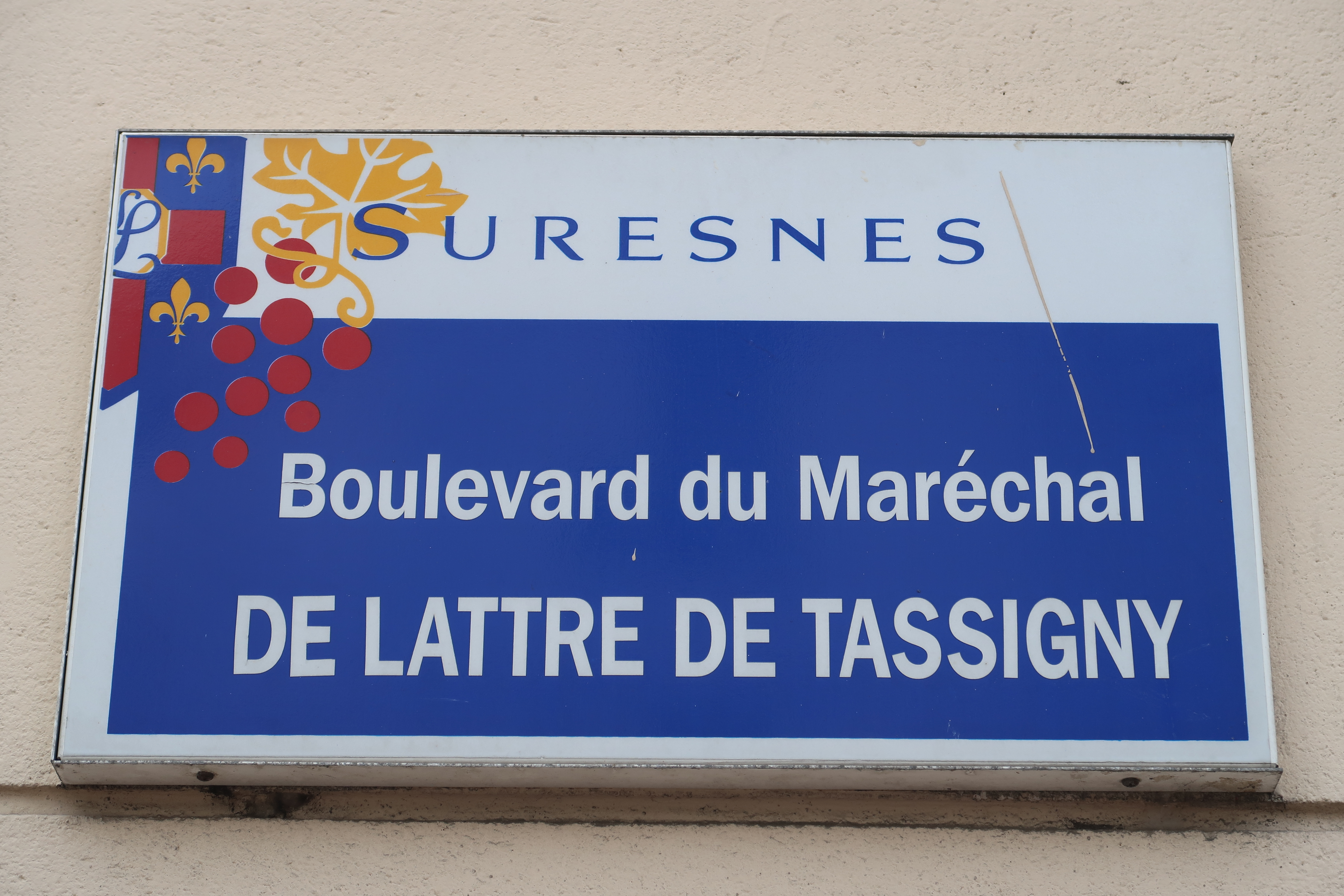
Boulevard Maréchal de Lattre de Tassigny in Suresnes

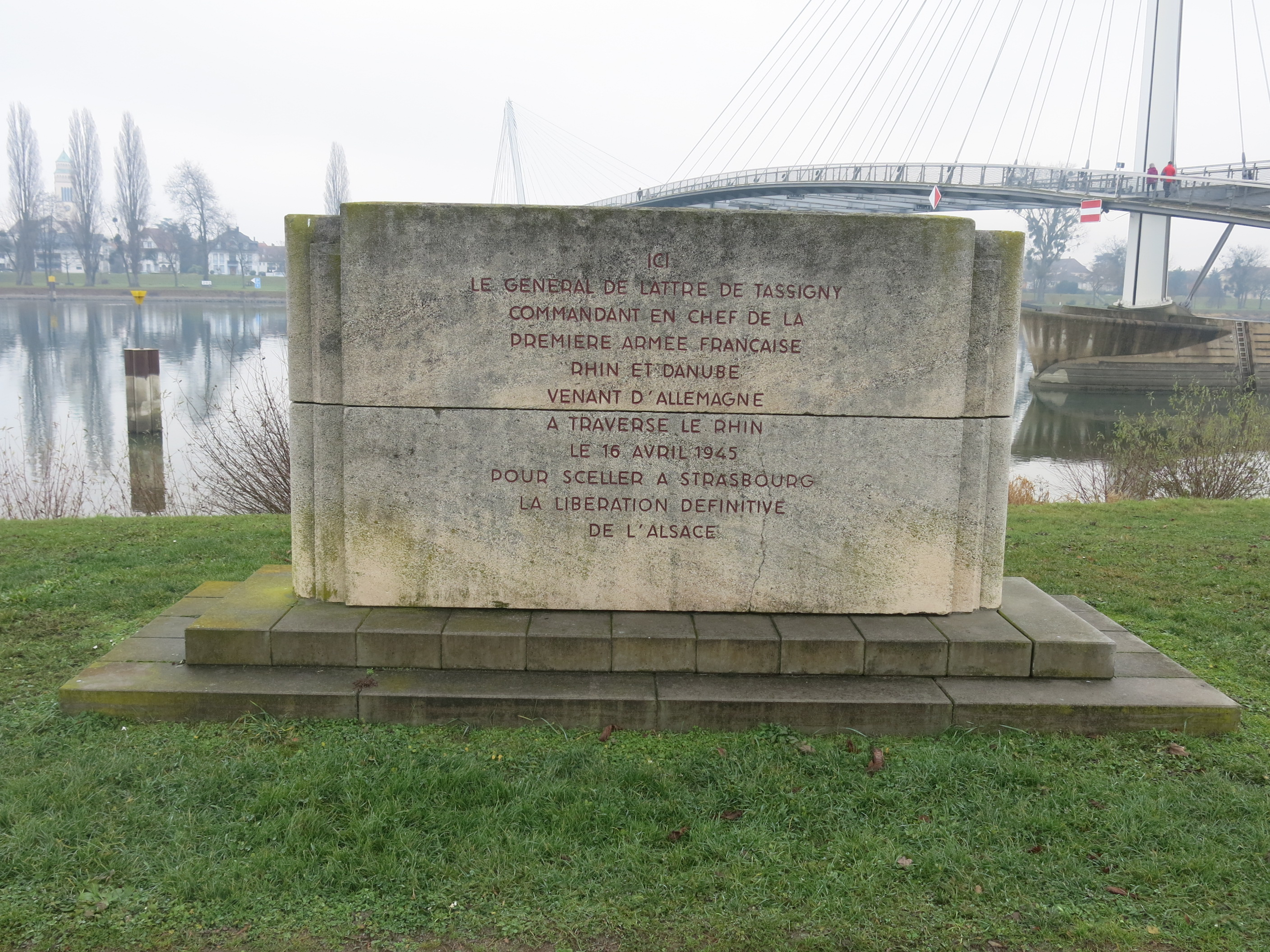
Memorial in the Jardin des Deux-Rives, Strasbourg

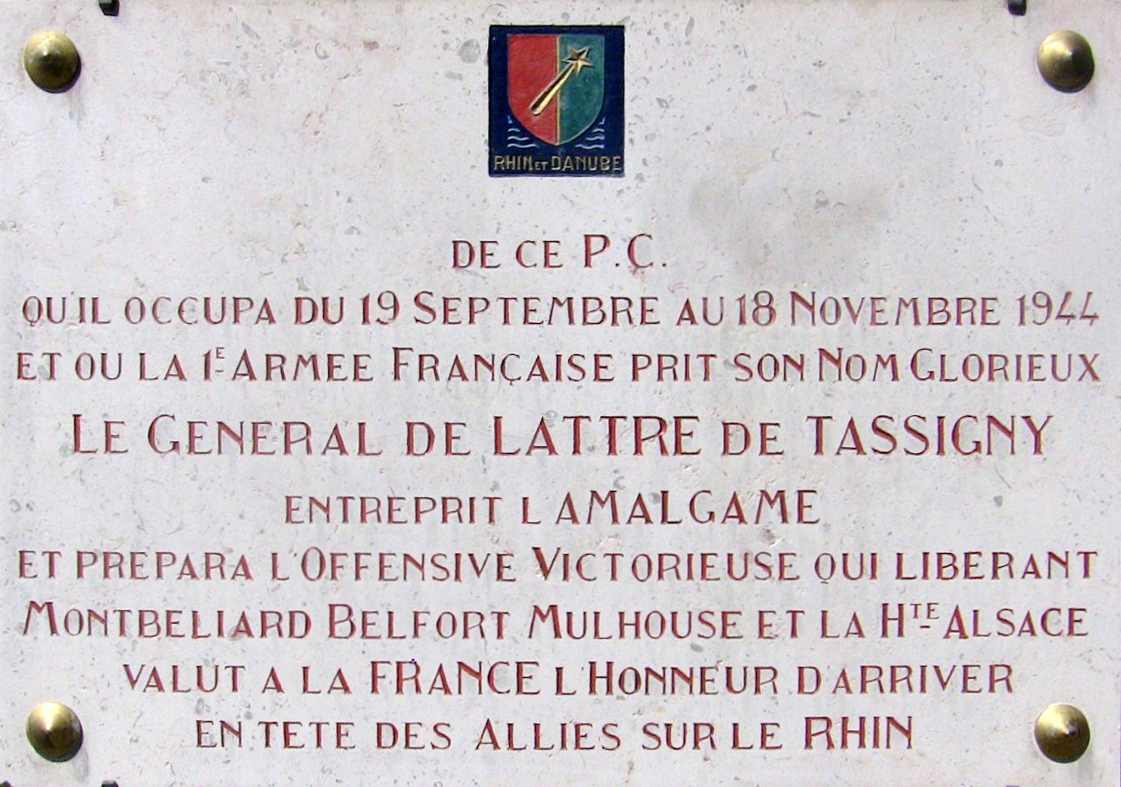
Plaque in Besançon

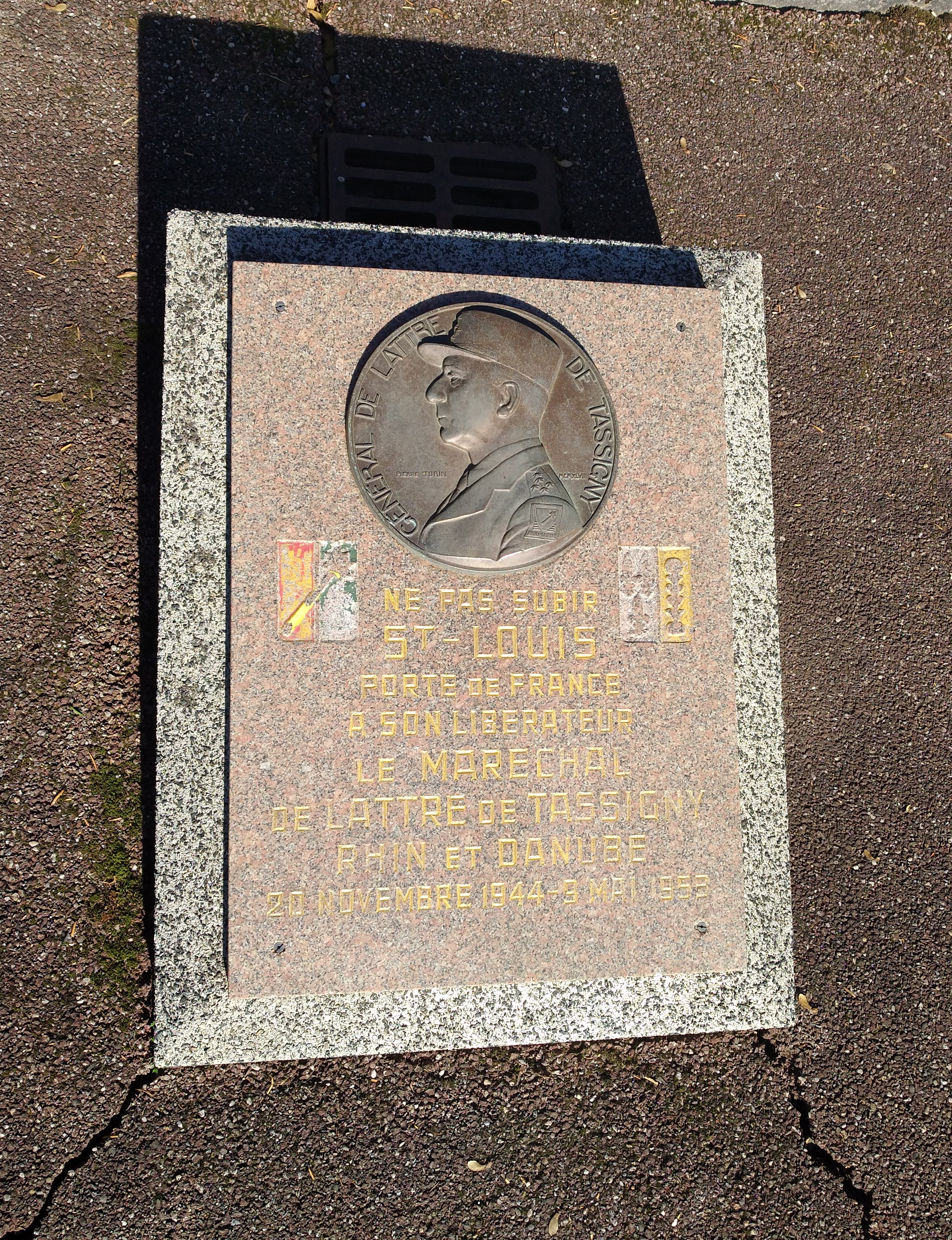
Plaque in Saint-Louis, Haut-Rhin

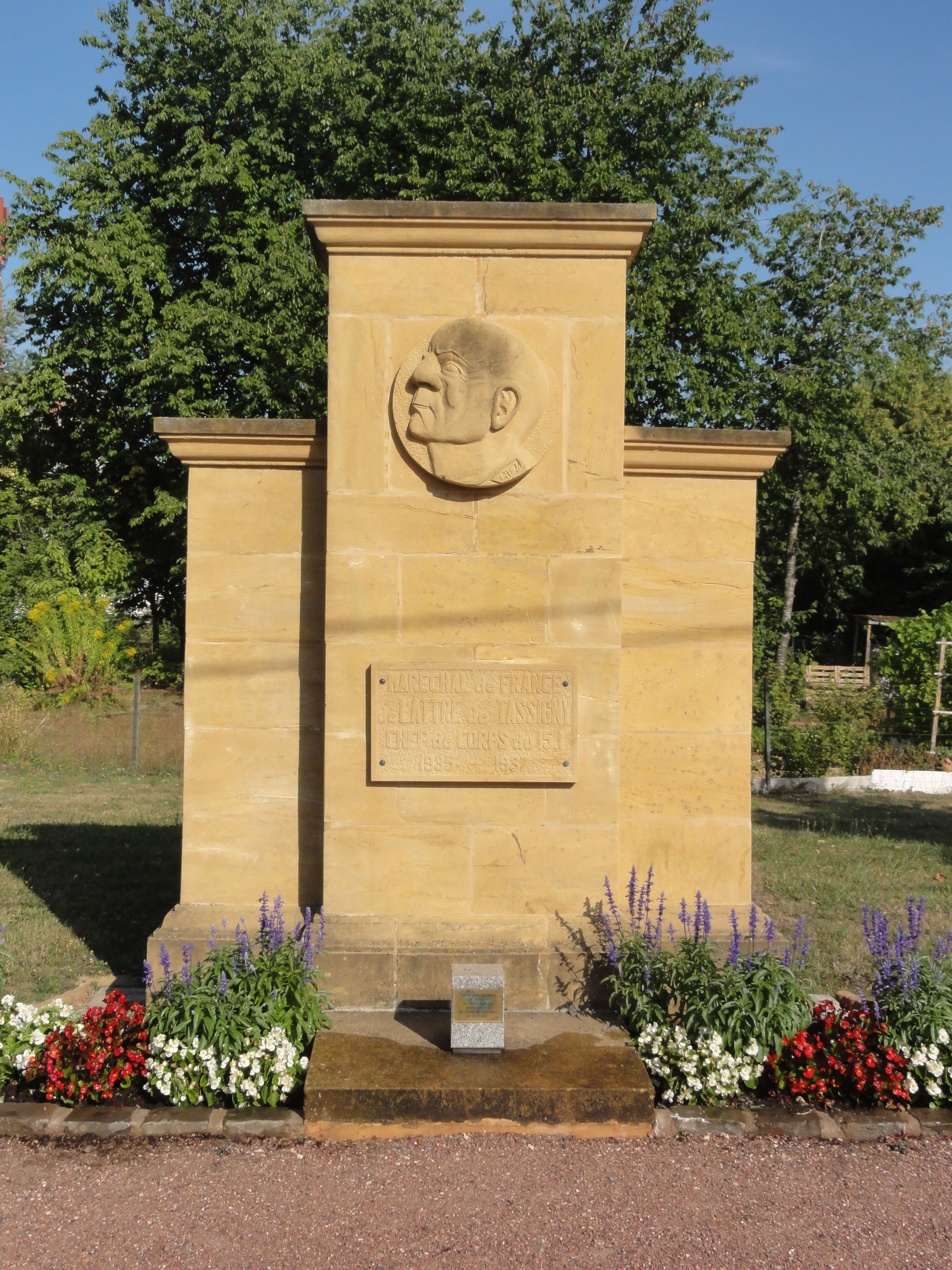
Memorial in Thierville-sur-Meuse

== Publications ==
- Histoire de la Première Armée française Rhin et Danube. Plon, Paris 1949
- Ne pas subir. Writings between 1914 and 1952, Plon, Paris 1984
- Reconquérir : 1944–1945. Texts gathered and presented by Jean-Luc Barré, Plon, Paris 1985
- La Ferveur et le sacrifice : Indochine 1951. Texts gathered and presented by Jean-Luc Barré, Plon, Paris 1987
