= Bernard de Lattre de Tassigny =

French military officer, resistance member

- Born: 11 February 1928; Paris, France
- Died: 30 May 1951 (aged 23); Ninh Binh, Vietnam
- Relatives: Jean de Lattre de Tassigny
- Military career
- Allegiance: France
- Branch: French Army
- Service years: 1944–1951
- Rank: Lieutenant
- Conflicts: World War II; First Indochina War; Battle of the Day River †
- Awards: Médaille militaire Croix de guerre 1939–1945; Croix de guerre TOE

Bernard de Lattre de Tassigny (11 February 1928 – 30 May 1951) was a French Army officer, who fought during World War II and the First Indochina War. Bernard de Lattre received several medals during his military career, including the Médaille militaire. He was killed in action at the age of 23, fighting near Ninh Binh. At the time of his death, his father, General Jean de Lattre de Tassigny, was the overall commander of French forces in Indochina. Bernard's death received widespread newspaper coverage, with headlines drawing attention to the death of the son of a general. His mother worked to preserve the memory of her son, as well as that of her more famous husband who died in 1952. Their legacy includes an open-air memorial chapel and centre in Wildenstein, Alsace, France. The death of Bernard de Lattre is mentioned in histories of the First Indochina War, and it has been compared to the deaths of other sons of generals and military leaders.

== Early life and World War II ==
Bernard de Lattre de Tassigny was born on 11 February 1928 in Paris, France. He was the only child of the French battalion chief and future war hero and general Jean de Lattre de Tassigny, and his wife Simonne de Lamazière, both French aristocrats.

Bernard was 12 when France was conquered by Nazi Germany in July 1940 during World War II. His father fought in the army during the invasion, later commanding forces in the "free zone" in Montpellier and Tunisia, but he was arrested for resisting the German military occupation of Vichy France in November 1942, and sentenced to 10 years in prison. Bernard de Lattre, then aged 15, aided his father's escape from Riom prison on 3 September 1943. His father went to Algiers via London, while Bernard and his mother went into hiding. Bernard eventually escaped France through the Pyrenees, and crossed Spain to reach North Africa. There, like his father, he joined the forces of the Free French.

Still only 16, Bernard received special dispensation from General Charles de Gaulle to join the army being assembled to invade France, and subsequently fought in the liberation of southern France and also in Germany. He was seriously wounded on 8 September 1944, at Autun, returning later to fight again in Germany. It was for his actions in these campaigns that he received the Médaille militaire, the youngest to receive that medal, and his first Croix de Guerre.

Following the war, Bernard de Lattre studied at the French military school (the EMIA) from August 1945, training in the armoured cavalry section. He was promoted to Lieutenant on 26 November 1948.

== First Indochina War and death ==
Bernard de Lattre served in the French army during the First Indochina War, embarking at Marseille on 1 July 1949. He became a platoon and then squadron leader, and took part in the Battle of Dien Mai. He received his second Croix de Guerre during this campaign, being awarded the medal by his father on 11 May 1951. He was killed in action 19 days later, near Ninh Binh, during the Battle of the Day River. He had died obeying his father's orders to hold the town at all costs; this stubbornly fought battle is credited with halting Vietminh General Giap's advance on the Red River Delta at that time. The citation for his actions concluded:

He fell heroically, giving an example of the finest military virtues.

— (translated by Time magazine)

Following his son's death, his father arranged for a Catholic mass to be held in the cathedral in Hanoi. Two days after the battle, Bernard de Lattre's body was flown home to France, accompanied by his father, and the young soldier was buried with military honours. The graves of all three de Lattre are now located side-by-side in the cemetery in Mouilleron-en-Pareds, the birthplace of Jean de Lattre.

Bernard de Lattre's death received widespread press coverage at the time, including articles in Le Figaro, Le Monde, The New York Times and Time magazine. His funeral was featured in Life magazine as Picture of the Week. Bernard Fall in his book Street Without Joy describes the death of Bernard in the context of the bigger battle for the delta:

The initial Viet-Minh attack, which began on May 29, benefited, as was almost always the case, from complete surprise. As dawn broke, the bulk of the 308th Infantry Division overran the French positions in and around Ninh-Binh, penetrating into the town and pinning down the remaining French survivors in the church. During that chaotic first night of the battle, a battalion of hastily-gathered Vietnamese reinforcements from nearby Nam-Dinh was thrown into the battle. One of its companies, headed by the French commander-in-chief's only child, Lieutenant Bernard de Lattre, was ordered to hold at all costs a French fort situated on a crag overlooking Ninh-Binh. In spite of intense mortar shelling, de Lattre's company held on, but when dawn came, young de Lattre and two of his senior NCO's lay dead on the crag. (Before the Indochina war was over, twenty more sons of French marshals and generals were to die in it as officers; another twenty-two died in Algeria later.)

— Bernard Fall, Street Without Joy, pg. 45.

== Decorations ==
- 1945 – Médaille militaire
- 1945 – Croix de guerre 1939–1945
- 1951 – Croix de guerre des théâtres d'opérations extérieures

== Legacy ==
Bernard de Lattre's death greatly impacted his father and mother. His father in particular was said to have been deeply affected, and he died of cancer less than eight months later. His mother, now entitled to call herself Madame la Maréchale following the posthumous promotion of her husband, is described in an obituary published in 2003, as having "devoted herself to the memory of her son and to the history of her husband and the armies that he had commanded".

In 1952, a 308-page book titled Un destin héroïque: Bernard de Lattre (A heroic destiny: Bernard de Lattre), was published. The book is a collection of stories of Bernard's life, along with letters that he wrote. The book was written and edited by the French professor of philosophy Robert Garric. A further written response to Bernard de Lattre's death was provided by his mother in her two-volume work on her husband: Jean de Lattre: mon mari (Paris, 1972). In this work, Madame de Lattre writes about her husband's response to the death of their son, but also writes about her own feelings, and the idealism of a generation of French soldiers dying as her son had.

One of the lasting memorials to Bernard de Lattre is a small open-air chapel in the commune of Wildenstein, in the Haut-Rhin département in Alsace in north-eastern France. Now known as the Chapelle Saint-Bernard, this structure was inaugurated in 1955. It consists of an altar and a small shelter beside a hiking trail. Construction at the site began in 1954, using plans approved by Madame de Lattre. The building material used was pink sandstone from nearby Rouffach. The site is dedicated to the memory of Bernard de Lattre, his father Jean de Lattre, and the French forces that fought in the area in 1944 to liberate Alsace from the Germans in World War II. The chapel later fell into disrepair, but was renovated and reinaugurated during a service on 20 August 2004, the day dedicated to Saint Bernard of Clairvaux. There is an annual service held here in honour of Bernard de Lattre de Tassigny, attended by veteran associations, local dignitaries and relatives of the de Lattre.

Also located in Wildenstein is the Centre Bernard de Lattre, which includes a memorial to Jean de Lattre. This memorial was originally located in Algeria, but was moved to Wildenstein in 1962 after Algeria gained independence from France. Additional commemoration of Bernard de Lattre's name came when the 1984–1985 class of the Ecole Militaire Interarmes, the military school at which he had studied, was named 'Promotion Lieutenant Bernard de Lattre de Tassigny' in his honour. An annual service also takes place at the graves of the de Lattre in Mouilleron-en-Pareds.

Historians and other authors writing about the First Indochina War have commented on the symbolism of Bernard de Lattre's death. In Soldats perdus: de l'Indochine à l'Algérie, dans la tourmente des guerres (2007), French journalist and author Hélène Erlingsen says that Bernard de Lattre's death was symbolic "of the modern world devastated by war" and that his life was "representative of our time". Bernard de Lattre's death has been placed in context in relation to other deaths in this war, with Brian Moynahan, in the 2007 work The French century: an illustrated history of modern France, noting that "in all 21 sons of French marshals and generals died in Indochina".
