= Battle of Vyazma–Bryansk =

Series of encirclement battles during Operation Typhoon

- Part of Eastern Front (World War II)
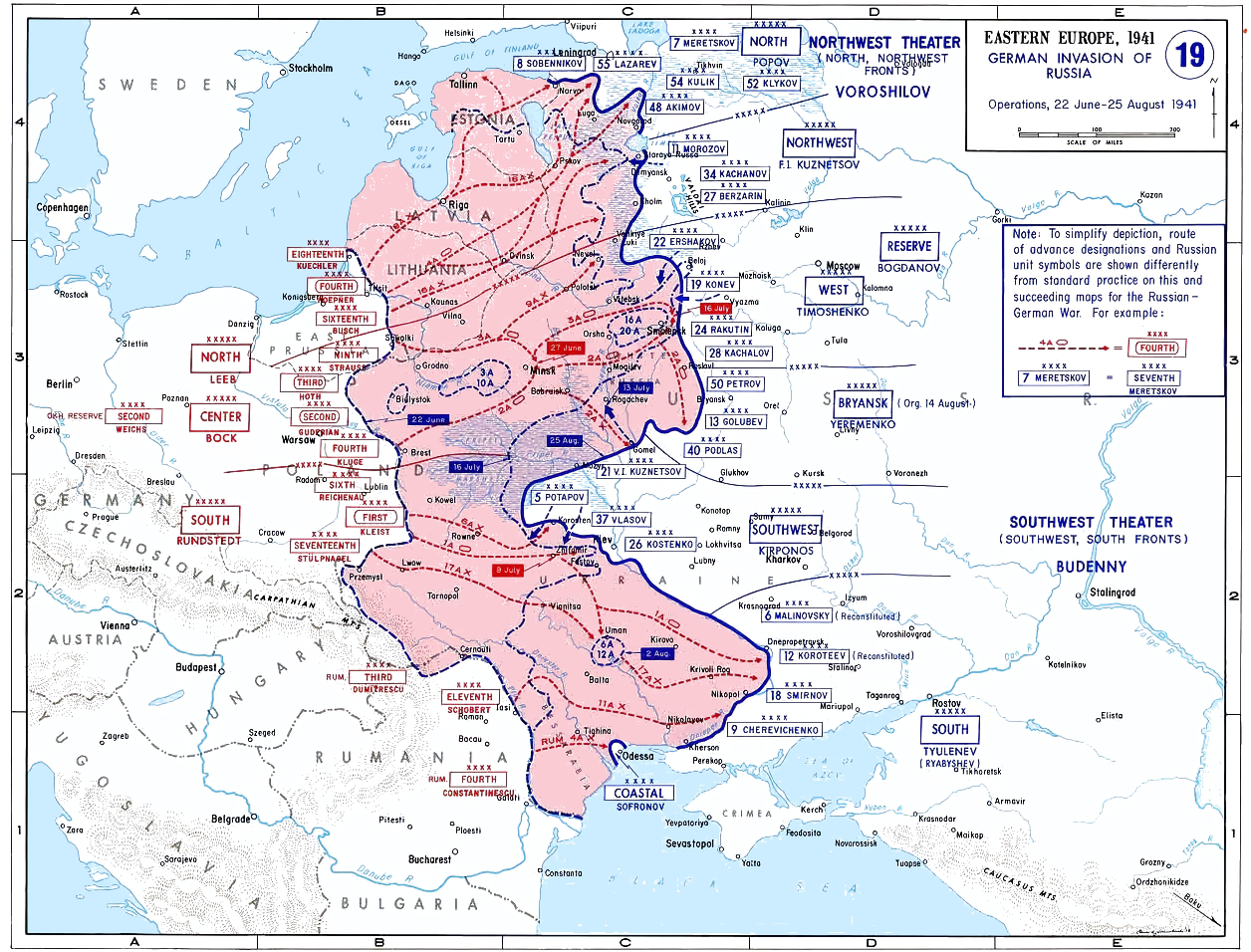
- The frontline on the Eastern Front (1941)
Date	September 30 – October 30, 1941
Location	Vyazma and Bryansk, Russian SFSR, Soviet Union near Moscow
Result	German victory

Belligerents
Germany	Soviet Union

Commanders and leaders
Fedor von Bock; Günther von Kluge; Hermann Hoth; Erich Hoepner; Adolf Strauss; Georg-Hans Reinhardt	Ivan Konev; Semyon Budyonny; Georgy Zhukov; Mikhail Lukin

Strength
46 infantry divisions 1 cavalry division 14 armored divisions 8 motorized infantry divisions 6 security divisions 1 SS cavalry brigade Total: 1,929,406 soldiers*	84 rifle divisions 1 rifle brigade 9 cavalry divisions 3 motorized divisions 13 tank brigades Total: 1,250,000 soldiers

Casualties and losses
unknown	67 rifle divisions 6 cavalry divisions 7 armored divisions 1,242 tanks 5,412 guns 663,000 prisoners
- Not all German soldiers participated in the offensive.

The twin battles of Vyazma and Bryansk were a military confrontation during World War II on the German-Soviet front. They began under the code name Operation Typhoon on September 30, 1941, with the attack of the German Army Group Centre against the Soviet Western, Reserve and Bryansk Front. The goal of the German offensive was the destruction of the formations of the Red Army before Moscow and subsequently the capture of the city itself. Despite initial successes of the Wehrmacht, which was able to encircle and destroy large parts of the Soviet defenders at Vyazma and Bryansk, the advance stalled by October 30, 1941, in the autumn mud and the strengthening Soviet resistance. Only after more than two weeks could it resume the offensive with the onset of frost weather and thus open the Battle of Moscow.

== Background ==
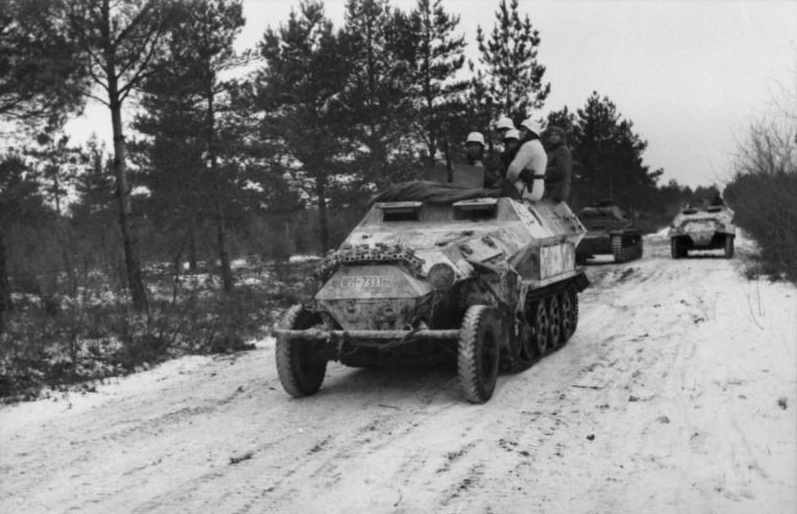
Two German armored personnel carriers Sd.Kfz. 251 (Hanomag half-track) with winter camouflage and an uncamouflaged Panzer II at the end of October 1941 advancing towards Moscow

Since the beginning of the attack on the Soviet Union on June 22, 1941, the three German army groups had broken through the defense of the Red Army and destroyed numerous Soviet formations in several encirclements. The Army Group Centre was directed towards Moscow. It had won the battles of Minsk and Smolensk, but on July 30, 1941, received the order to temporarily halt the advance.

In the days before, the so-called August crisis had arisen in the German leadership regarding the question of how the further operations should be shaped. Hitler was of the opinion that the capture of Moscow was not a priority. In his view, the economically important areas of Ukraine should first be occupied and Leningrad conquered. Therefore, the Army Group Centre should hand over its armored forces to the neighboring army groups North and South, in whose operational areas these goals lay. For the advance on Moscow, however, only the weakened infantry armies would remain, which were not up to this task in view of ongoing Soviet counterattacks. The military leadership in the Oberkommando des Heeres (OKH) considered this decision wrong and tried to dissuade Hitler from it. The Chief of the Army General Staff Colonel General Franz Halder pointed out the danger that by renouncing the advance on Moscow, the enemy would gain time and could bring a later German offensive to a halt with the onset of winter, whereby the military goal of Operation Barbarossa would not be achieved. Nevertheless, Hitler enforced his ideas on July 28 by turning the 2nd Army and the 2nd Panzer Group south into Ukraine, where they participated in the Battle of Kiev. The 3rd Panzer Group was relocated to the north to participate in the conquest of Leningrad.

Only after some "persuasive work" could the OKH and the Wehrmachtführungsstab prevail in mid-August. Hitler stipulated in Führer Directive No. 34 on August 12 that the "state, armaments, and transportation center" Moscow should be occupied before the onset of winter. However, the goals of Leningrad and Ukraine still had priority, so the fighting there should first be concluded before an offensive on Moscow could be prepared. The fighting in Ukraine and before Leningrad dragged on until September. Already before their final conclusion, however, Hitler issued on September 6, 1941, Führer Directive No. 35, which formed the basis of the future offensive:

The initial successes against the enemy forces located between the inner flanks of Army Groups South and Centre have [...] created the basis for a decisive operation against the Army Group Timoshenko (Note: There was no "Army Group Timoshenko". Meant is the "High Command of the Troops of the Western Direction" led by Marshal of the Soviet Union Semyon Timoshenko, which was dissolved shortly thereafter. Timoshenko was subsequently transferred to the Southwestern Front.) fixed in attack battles before the Army Centre. It must be decisively defeated in the limited time available before the onset of winter weather. For this purpose, all forces of the Army and the Air Force that become dispensable on the flanks and can be brought up in time must be concentrated.

— Adolf Hitler

As the goal of the operation, the directive stipulated "to destroy the enemy located in the area eastward of Smolensk in a double envelopment set in the general direction of Vyazma [...]. [...] Only then [...] will Army Group Centre have to advance to the pursuit direction Moscow – leaning right on the Oka, left on the upper Volga." With this, Hitler had swung back to the rough line of the OKH and the High Commands of the Army Group Centre after the "August crisis".

=== German attack preparations ===
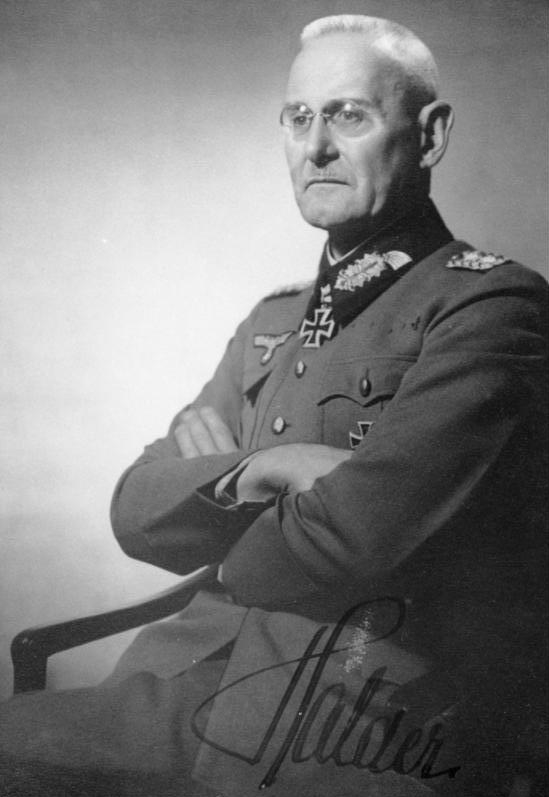
Colonel General Franz Halder, planner of "Operation Typhoon"

The German General Staff had already presented an operational plan on August 18, 1941, before the decision to turn the armored formations against Kiev, which provided for a double envelopment of the Soviet formations before the Army Group Centre. In this planning, it was initially left open whether after a successful advance, the envelopment of Moscow should be directly transitioned to or whether first the Soviet formations before the capital should be encircled and destroyed. Already in a discussion between Hitler and the Commander-in-Chief of the Army Field Marshal Walther von Brauchitsch on August 30, 1941, they had agreed on a new advance towards Moscow. Already before Hitler's official directive, the commanders of the affected armies were informed. A few days later, Directive No. 35 followed from Hitler's headquarters.

The Oberkommando des Heeres (OKH) issued a Directive for the Continuation of Operations on September 10, 1941, in which Chief of the General Staff Franz Halder specified Hitler's directive and partially reinterpreted it. In Hitler's plan, the capture of Moscow was only envisaged after the destruction of the Soviet forces, while Halder ordered to let formations advance on the capital simultaneously. Furthermore, he included the 2nd Army and the 2nd Panzer Group, which were still bound before Kiev at that time, in the plans. These should advance from the area of Romny against Oryol. With this, Halder had additionally created a third assault group for the attack to the east. (Note: According to other information, the idea of a third assault grouping went back to the plans of Fedor von Bock; cf. Reinhardt, Klaus (1972). Die Wende vor Moskau – Das Scheitern der Strategie Hitlers im Winter 1941/42 [The Turning Point before Moscow – The Failure of Hitler's Strategy in the Winter of 1941/42] (in German). Stuttgart: Deutsche Verlags-Anstalt. pp. 50f.) The directive also provided for the handover of troops from the other army groups. The Army Group South had to hand over two general commands, four infantry divisions, two armored divisions and two motorized infantry divisions, while from the Army Group North with the 4th Panzer Group three general commands, five armored divisions and two motorized infantry divisions.

While Hitler wanted to set the pincer arms of the armored troops directly on Vyazma, Field Marshal Fedor von Bock, the Commander-in-Chief of the Army Group Centre, wanted to carry out the envelopment of the enemy only far behind Vyazma at Gzhatsk. Colonel General Halder agreed and assured von Bock of his support. On September 17, 1941, both discussed the concrete operational plans worked out by von Bock. On September 24, the Commanders-in-Chief of the armies, panzer groups and the 2nd Air Fleet (Luftflotte 2) met with von Bock and Halder in Smolensk for a final discussion of the undertaking, which had received the designation Operation Typhoon on September 19. In it, it was determined that the 2nd Panzer Group should already advance to the attack on September 30, two days before the other formations. This had been enforced by Colonel General Heinz Guderian; since there were hardly any paved roads in his attack area, he was of the opinion that he had to gain paved roads at Oryol as quickly as possible and from there lateral connections to Bryansk.

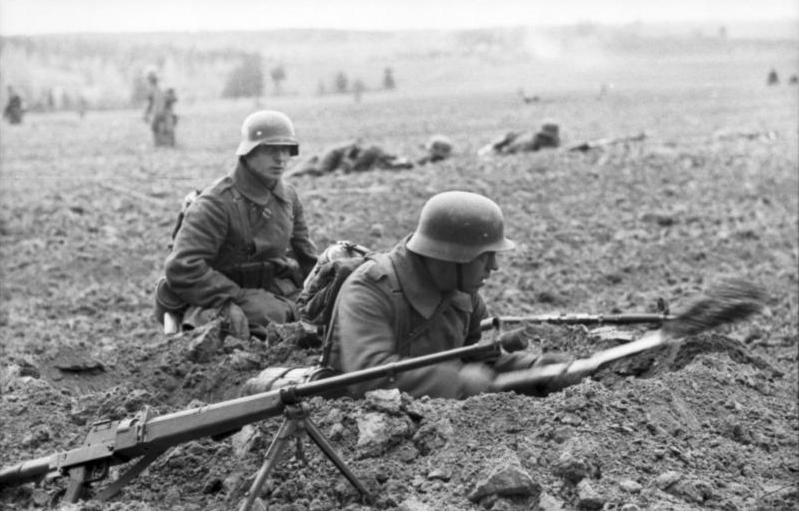
Soldiers of the 4th Panzer Group in September/October 1941

The final orders to the individual armies were issued on September 26. To ensure close cooperation between panzer groups and infantry armies, the 4th Panzer Group was operationally subordinated to the 4th Army. It should attack along the road Roslavl–Moscow and after the successful breakthrough swing in on both sides of Vyazma against the Smolensk–Moscow highway. North of that, the 3rd Panzer Group, which was subordinated to the 9th Army, was to break through the Soviet lines south of Bely and gain the road Vyazma–Rzhev, before turning in west of Vyazma. Meanwhile, the inner flanks of both groupings should bind the enemy before them. The 2nd Army was ordered to advance against Sukhinichi and Meshchovsk to protect the flank of the 9th Army. Finally, the 2nd Panzer Group, which was directly under the High Command of the Army Group Centre, was to roll up the Soviet positions from the south. In cooperation with the 2nd Army, the enemy in the area of Bryansk was to be destroyed. The start of the attack should be (except for the 2nd Panzer Group) October 2, 1941, at 5:30 a.m.

Hitler had demanded from Halder on September 6 that the operation should begin within eight to ten days, which the latter described as impossible given the condition of the troops. The 2nd Panzer Group and the 2nd Army first had to be detached from the encirclement ring of the Kiev pocket, moreover, the formations had lost their offensive power in the long defensive battles before Smolensk. The relocation of formations from the other army groups over more than 600 km distance as well as the bringing up of the 2nd and 5th Panzer Division from Germany (Note: Hitler had these divisions newly equipped and refreshed to use them after a victory over the Soviet Union.) took a lot of time. Moreover, it was no longer possible to compensate for the personnel losses of the previous months. Nevertheless, the Army Group Centre could field a total of 1,929,406 soldiers in 78 divisions (46 inf div, 1 cav div, 14 pz div, 8 mot inf div, 6 sec div, 1 SS cav bde) on October 2, 1941, but not all participated in the planned offensive. However, these formations had suffered considerable loss of combat power, as both the soldiers and the material had been in continuous use for months.

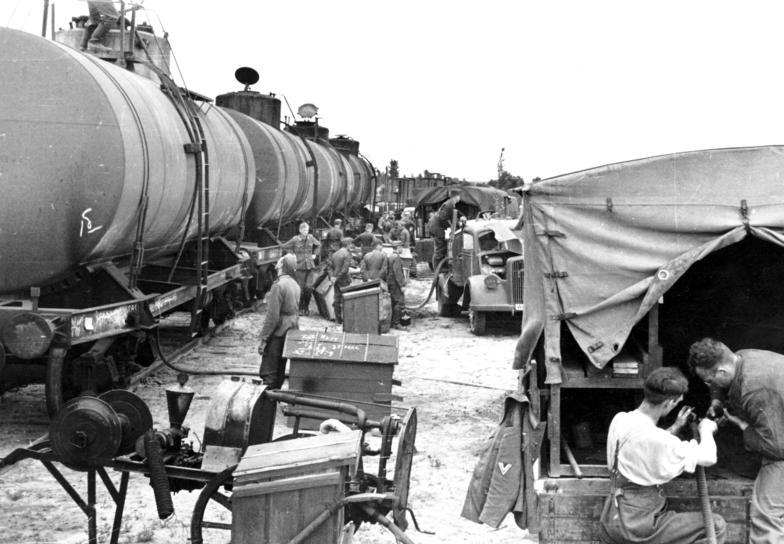
Provision of fuel by the Reichsbahn

In addition, Hitler held back large quantities of tanks that he had intended for use after the collapse of the Soviet Union. Since the constant failures were therefore not replaced, the tank inventory of the 2nd Panzer Group at the beginning of the operations was only 50 percent, that of the 3rd Panzer Group 70 to 80 percent and only that of the 4th Panzer Group slightly below 100 percent. However, hardly all vehicles were operational from these inventories. In addition, there was a deficit of 22 percent in motor vehicles and 30 percent in tractors. (Note: Operational tanks available: 3rd Pz Div 20 %, 17th Pz Div 17 %, 4th Pz Div 29 %, 18th Pz Div 31 %, 20th Pz Div 34 %, 11th Pz Div 72 %, 10th Pz Div 88 %, 2nd Pz Div 94 %, 5th Pz Div 100 % and 1st, 6th and 7th Pz Div at about 30 %; cf. Reinhardt, Klaus (1972). Die Wende vor Moskau – Das Scheitern der Strategie Hitlers im Winter 1941/42 [The Turning Point before Moscow – The Failure of Hitler's Strategy in the Winter of 1941/42] (in German). Stuttgart: Deutsche Verlags-Anstalt. pp. 54f.) Only 125 tanks were promised as replacements, although Colonel General Halder unsuccessfully requested the release of another 181 tanks. But even with their delivery, the operational readiness of the particularly weakened armored divisions would have increased by only 10 percent. The claim of Soviet historiography that the German assault formations were fully replenished and equipped, with 1700 tanks available to them, does not correspond to the facts. The historian Klaus Reinhardt determined the figure of 1220 tanks for the actual inventory.

In Gomel, Roslavl, Smolensk and Vitebsk, supply depots were also established for the supply of the troops during the planned offensive. However, to replenish the depots in September, 27 supply trains would have been necessary daily, in October even 29. The actual performance, however, amounted to these numbers only in the first 13 days. At the end of September and in October, only 22 trains arrived daily, before the number fell further to 20 in November. The supply was therefore only considered "satisfactory".

=== Soviet situation ===
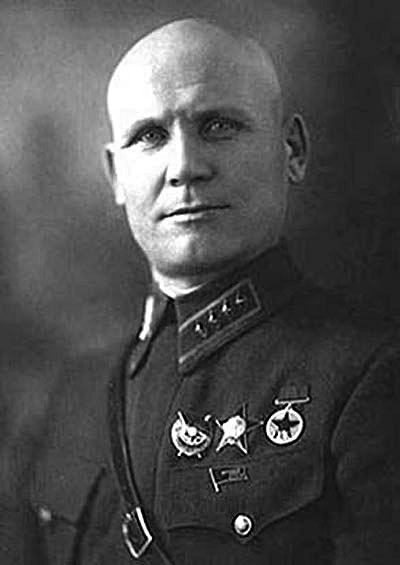
Colonel General Konev, commander of the Soviet Western Front

Already shortly after the battles for Smolensk, the Soviet State Defense Committee (GKO) ordered the expansion of defensive positions before Moscow. Since July 16, 1941, the construction of a fortified defense line was carried out in the area of Mozhaysk with the involvement of civilians. About 85,000–100,000 Muscovites, mainly women, are said to have participated in the work. Until the beginning of the German offensive, the various defensive structures (bunkers, anti-tank obstacles, trenches) were only completed to 40 to 80 percent each.

On September 12, 1941, Colonel General I. S. Konev took command of the Western Front. This included at that time the 22nd, 29th, 30th, 19th, 16th and 20th Armies, which stood side by side from Lake Seliger in the north to Yelnya in the south. In addition, there was the Reserve Front of Marshal of the Soviet Union S. M. Budyonny, whose 24th and 43rd Armies stood along the Desna and thus connected left to the Western Front, but with its main mass (31st, 49th, 32nd and 33rd Armies) in the area of Vyazma 35 km behind the front also formed a second defense line. Further south stood the 50th, 3rd and 13th Armies of the Bryansk Front under Colonel General A. I. Yeryomenko in the area between Zhukovka and Vorozhba. These fronts comprised about 40 percent of the personnel and artillery as well as 35 percent of the tanks and aircraft of all Soviet forces.

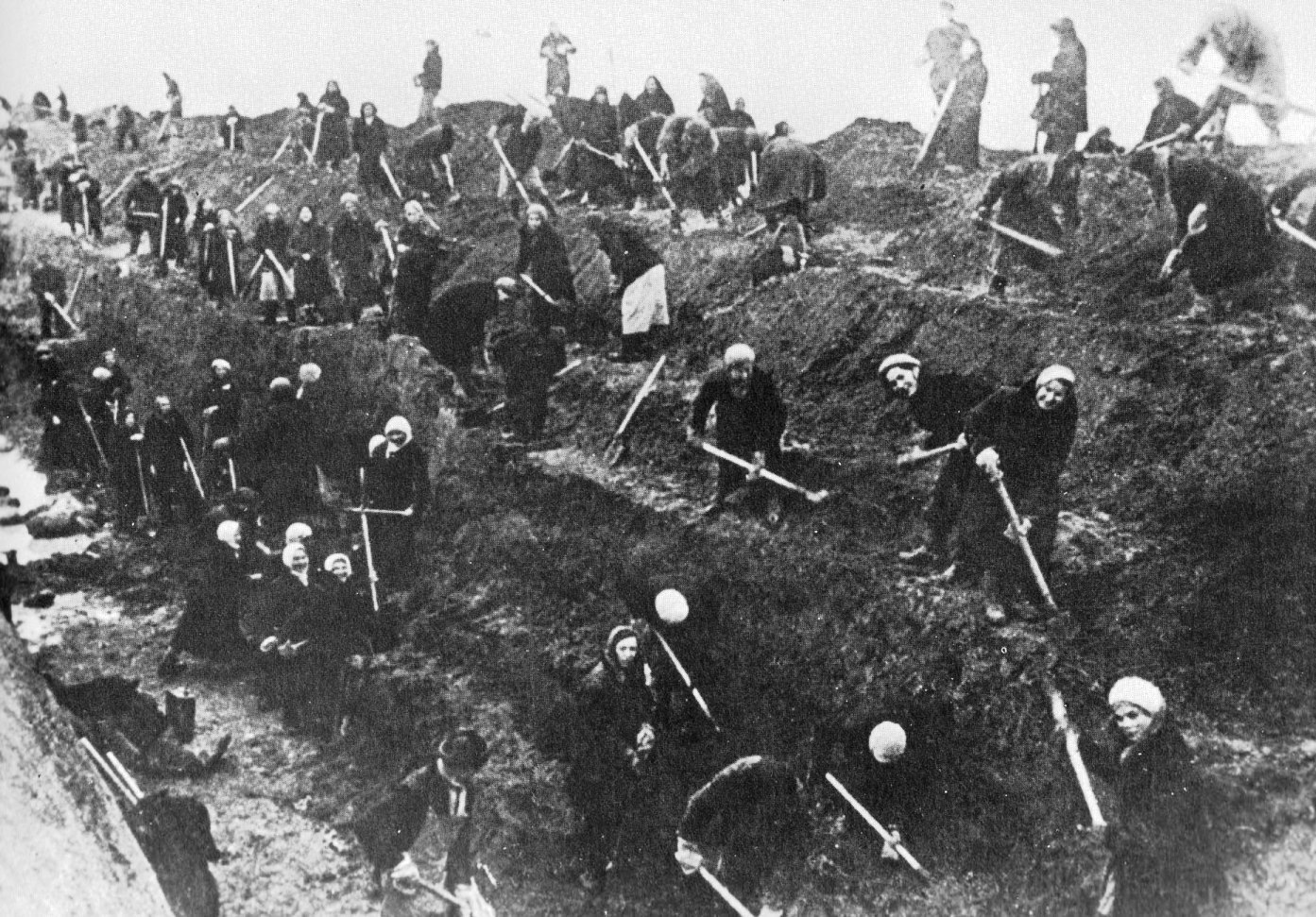
Soviet women working on an anti-tank ditch before Moscow

After the enormous losses that the Red Army had suffered in the summer of 1941, it now lacked trained general staff officers. In addition, there was a lack of signal equipment, so that the connection between the individual staffs was poor and susceptible to disruptions. In part, the frontline was also too thinly occupied. The six armies of the Western Front defended a section of 340 km, with each army having 5–6 rifle divisions in the first line and only one in reserve. The formations consisted only partially of trained veterans, supplemented with practically untrained volunteers. Due to their hasty mobilization, they lacked machine guns and other infantry weapons. Allegedly, only 6 to 9 guns were available per front kilometer. The Red Army had also not been able to compensate for the losses of tanks in the numerous battles of the previous months. Colonel General Konev had 479 tanks, but only 45 of them were of a modern type. In the official Soviet representation, the number of 770 tanks was later given for the entire western section of the front. However, there are no reliable figures on the extent of the Soviet forces in the three fronts. In various Soviet publications, they range from 800,000 soldiers, 6,800 guns, 780 tanks and 360–527 aircraft to a maximum of 1,250,000 soldiers, 10,598 guns, 990 tanks and 930 aircraft. According to the archive-based figures of the Russian historian G. F. Krivosheev from 2001, the higher numbers are more likely.

Extent of the Soviet fronts on October 1, 1941
Front	Rifle divisions	Rifle brigades	Cavalry divisions	Motorized divisions	Tank brigades	Personnel strength
Western Front	31	1	3	2	4	558,000
Reserve Front	28	—	2	—	5	448,000
Bryansk Front	25	—	4	1	4	244,000
Total	84	1	9	3	13	1,250,000

Colonel General Konev pointed out to the Stavka on September 26 the detected German attack preparations, which suggested an offensive for October 1. However, he expected only a relatively limited advance in the area of the 19th, 16th and 20th Armies. The Stavka therefore reacted in its directive of September 27 only with general instructions. It ordered to accelerate the expansion of the defensive positions. The front commanders were instructed to relieve weakened divisions and move them behind the front for refreshment. In this way, reserves were to be created. The front troops themselves were put on heightened alert. However, the individual army commanders were not sufficiently informed. Lt. Gen. K. K. Rokossovsky, then commander of the 16th Army, wrote later in his memoirs: "The information of the army commanders was generally poorly organized at that time. Practically, we knew nothing about what was happening within, let alone outside the front, which greatly hindered our work." Only on September 28 was the Bryansk Front also warned of impending attacks. Colonel General Yeryomenko therefore proposed a regrouping of the troops. However, this did not happen because the German attack began two days later. In the area of the Western Front, Lieutenant General Konev prohibited any form of evasion. The troops should defend every meter of ground. To be prepared for possible breakthroughs of the enemy, he assembled at Vadino north of Dorogobuzh an operational reserve under his deputy Lieutenant General I. V. Boldin.

On express order of Stalin, the front commanders continued to undertake limited offensive operations, which weakened the defensive power of the troops and cost them heavy losses even before the beginning of the German attack. For example, the 43rd Army under Major General P. P. Sobennikov carried out an advance at Roslavl, while on September 29 Major General A. N. Yermakov received the order to recapture the city of Glukhov with his operational group. In both cases, the Soviets advanced directly into the assembly areas of the German troops and suffered high losses. In the following days, this facilitated the German troops' breakthrough through the Soviet lines.

== Comparison of forces ==
Structure of Army Group Centre on October 2, 1941

Army Group Centre (Field Marshal Fedor von Bock)
9th Army (Colonel General Adolf Strauss)
XXIII Army Corps (General of the Infantry Albrecht Schubert)
251st Infantry Division (Lieutenant General Karl Burdach)
102nd Infantry Division (Lieutenant General John Ansat)
256th Infantry Division (Lieutenant General Gerhard Kauffmann)
206th Infantry Division (Lieutenant General Hugo Höfl)
VIII Army Corps (General of the Artillery Walter Heitz)
28th Infantry Division (Lieutenant General Johann Sinnhuber)
8th Infantry Division (Major General Gustav Höhne)
87th Infantry Division (Lieutenant General Bogislav von Studnitz)
XXVII Army Corps (General of the Infantry Alfred Wäger)
255th Infantry Division (General of the Infantry Wilhelm Wetzel)
162nd Infantry Division (Lieutenant General Hermann Franke)
86th Infantry Division (Lieutenant General Joachim Witthöft)
Army reserve
161st Infantry Division (Lieutenant General Heinrich Recke)
3rd Panzer Group (Colonel General Hermann Hoth) (operationally subordinated to the 9th Army)
VI Army Corps (General of the Pioneers Otto-Wilhelm Förster)
110th Infantry Division (Lieutenant General Ernst Seifert)
26th Infantry Division (Lieutenant General Walter Weiß)
V Army Corps (General of the Infantry Richard Ruoff)
5th Infantry Division (Major General Karl Allmendinger)
35th Infantry Division (General of the Infantry Walther Fischer von Weikersthal)
106th Infantry Division (General of the Infantry Ernst Dehner)
XLI Army Corps (mot.) (General of Panzer Troops Georg-Hans Reinhardt)
36th Infantry Division (mot.) (Lieutenant General Otto-Ernst Ottenbacher)
1st Panzer Division (Major General Walter Krüger)
6th Infantry Division (Lieutenant General Helge Auleb)
LVI Army Corps (mot.) (General of Panzer Troops Ferdinand Schaal)
14th Infantry Division (mot.) (Major General Heinrich Wosch)
129th Infantry Division (Lieutenant General Stephan Rittau)
6th Panzer Division (Lieutenant General Franz Landgraf)
7th Panzer Division (Major General Hans Freiherr von Funck)
4th Army (Field Marshal Günther von Kluge)
IX Army Corps (General of the Infantry Hermann Geyer)
137th Infantry Division (Lieutenant General Friedrich Bergmann)
263rd Infantry Division (Lieutenant General Ernst Haeckel)
183rd Infantry Division (from October 4 Lieutenant General Richard Stempel)
292nd Infantry Division (Lieutenant General Willy Seeger)
XX Army Corps (General of the Infantry Friedrich Materna)
78th Infantry Division (Major General Emil Markgraf)
15th Infantry Division (Lieutenant General Ernst-Eberhard Hell)
268th Infantry Division (Lieutenant General Erich Straube)
VII Army Corps (General of the Artillery Wilhelm Fahrmbacher)
7th Infantry Division (Lieutenant General Eccard Freiherr von Gablenz)
267th Infantry Division (Major General Friedrich-Karl von Wachter)
23rd Infantry Division (Lieutenant General Heinz Hellmich)
197th Infantry Division (Major General Hermann Meyer-Rabingen)
4th Panzer Group (Colonel General Erich Hoepner) (operationally subordinated to the 4th Army)
LVII Army Corps (mot.) (General of Panzer Troops Adolf-Friedrich Kuntzen)
20th Panzer Division (Colonel Georg von Bismarck)
3rd Infantry Division (mot.) (Lieutenant General Curt Jahn)
SS Division Das Reich (mot.) (SS Group Leader Paul Hausser)
XXXXVI Army Corps (mot.) (Colonel General Heinrich von Vietinghoff)
5th Panzer Division (Major General Gustav Fehn)
11th Panzer Division (Major General Hans-Karl Freiherr von Esebeck)
252nd Infantry Division (Lieutenant General Diether von Böhm-Bezing)
XL Army Corps (mot.) (General of the Cavalry Georg Stumme)
2nd Panzer Division (Lieutenant General Rudolf Veiel)
10th Panzer Division (Major General Wolfgang Fischer)
258th Infantry Division (Major General Karl Pflaum)
XII Army Corps (General of the Infantry Walter Schroth)
98th Infantry Division (Lieutenant General Erich Schröck)
34th Infantry Division (General of the Artillery Hans Behlendorff)
2nd Army (Colonel General Maximilian von Weichs)
XIII Army Corps (General of the Infantry Hans Felber)
17th Infantry Division (Lieutenant General Herbert Loch)
260th Infantry Division (Lieutenant General Hans Schmidt)
XXXXIII Army Corps (General of the Infantry Gotthard Heinrici)
52nd Infantry Division (Major General Lothar Rendulic)
131st Infantry Division (Lieutenant General Heinrich Meyer-Buerdorf)
LIII Army Corps (General of the Infantry Karl Weisenberger)
56th Infantry Division (Lieutenant General Karl von Oven)
31st Infantry Division (Major General Gerhard Berthold)
167th Infantry Division (Major General Wolf-Günther Trierenberg)
2nd Panzer Group (from October 5 2nd Panzer Army, Colonel General Heinz Guderian)
XXXXVIII Army Corps (mot.) (General of Panzer Troops Werner Kempf)
9th Panzer Division (Lieutenant General Alfred Ritter von Hubicki)
25th Infantry Division (mot.) (Lieutenant General Heinrich Clößner)
16th Infantry Division (mot.) (Major General Johannes Streich)
XXXXVII Army Corps (mot.) (General of the Artillery Joachim Lemelsen)
17th Panzer Division (General of Panzer Troops Hans-Jürgen von Arnim)
18th Panzer Division (Major General Walther Nehring)
29th Infantry Division (mot.) (Major General Max Fremerey)
XXIV Army Corps (mot.) (General of Panzer Troops Leo Geyr von Schweppenburg)
3rd Panzer Division (Lieutenant General Walter Model)
4th Panzer Division (Major General Willibald von Langermann und Erlencamp)
10th Infantry Division (mot.) (Lieutenant General Friedrich-Wilhelm von Loeper)
Higher Command XXXV (General of the Artillery Rudolf Kämpfe)
95th Infantry Division (Lieutenant General Hans-Heinrich Sixt von Armin)
296th Infantry Division (Lieutenant General Wilhelm Stemmermann)
262nd Infantry Division (Lieutenant General Edgar Theißen)
293rd Infantry Division (Lieutenant General Justin von Obernitz)
1st Cavalry Division (Major General Kurt Feldt)
Higher Command XXXIV (General of the Infantry Hermann Metz)
45th Infantry Division (Major General Fritz Schlieper)
134th Infantry Division (Lieutenant General Conrad von Cochenhausen)
Army Group reserve
Infantry Regiment Großdeutschland (Colonel Walter Hörnlein)
19th Panzer Division (Lieutenant General Otto von Knobelsdorff)
Motorized Brigade 900 (Colonel Walter Krause)
Commander Rear Army Area Centre (General of the Infantry Max von Schenckendorff)
707th Infantry Division (Major General Gustav Freiherr von Mauchenheim)
339th Infantry Division (Major General Georg Hewelke)
SS Cavalry Brigade (SS Lieutenant Colonel Hermann Fegelein)
221st Security Division (Lieutenant General Johann Pflugbeil)
286th Security Division (Lieutenant General Kurt Müller)
403rd Security Division (Lieutenant General Wolfgang von Ditfurth)
454th Security Division (in transit)

Structure of the 2nd Air Fleet on October 10, 1941

2nd Air Fleet (Field Marshal Albert Kesselring)
VIII Air Corps (General of the Air Force Wolfram Freiherr von Richthofen)
2./Long-Range Reconnaissance Group 11, 7./Close Reconnaissance Group 21, IV./Transport Wing for Special Purposes 1, Combat Group for Special Purposes 106, I./Air Landing Wing 1
Staff and I./Bomber Wing 2, III./Bomber Wing 3, III./Bomber Wing 4
Staff, I. and III./Bomber Wing 76
Staff, I. and III. Dive Bomber Wing 2, II./Training Wing 2, 10./Training Wing 2
Staff and III. and 15./Fighter Wing 27, I. and II./Fighter Wing 52, II./Destroyer Wing 26
II Air Corps (General of the Air Force Bruno Loerzer)
1./Long-Range Reconnaissance Group 122, 5./Close Reconnaissance Group 23, II./Transport Wing for Special Purposes 1, Combat Group for Special Purposes 9, Combat Group for Special Purposes 105
Staff, I. and II./Bomber Wing 3
Staff, I., II. and III./Bomber Wing 53
Staff and I./Bomber Wing 28, Combat Group 100, III./Bomber Wing 26
Staff and II./Fast Bomber Wing 210
Staff, II. and III./Dive Bomber Wing 77
Staff, II. and III./Dive Bomber Wing 1
Staff, I., II., III. and IV./Fighter Wing 51
Staff, II. and III. Fighter Wing 3
I Flak Corps (Major General Walther von Axthelm)
Flak Regiment 101
Flak Regiment 104

Structure of the involved formations of the Red Army on October 2, 1941

Western Front (Colonel General Ivan Konev from October 12 Army General Georgy Zhukov, Chief of Staff: Lieutenant General V. D. Sokolovsky)
22nd Army (Major General Vasily Yushkevich)
126th Rifle Division (Colonel Yefim Vasilyevich Bedny)
133rd Rifle Division (Major General Vasily Ivanovich Shvetsov)
174th Rifle Division (Colonel Pavel Fedoseyevich Ilyinich)
179th Rifle Division (Brigade Commander Nikolai Ivanovich Konchits)
186th Rifle Division (Colonel Anton Petrovich Pilipenko)
256th Rifle Division (Major General Sergei Georgiyevich Goryachev)
29th Army (Lieutenant General Ivan Maslennikov)
178th Rifle Division (Lieutenant Colonel Alexander Petrovich Kvashnin)
243rd Rifle Division (Colonel Yakov Gavrilovich Zarkov)
246th Rifle Division (Major General Ivan Ivanovich Melnikov)
252nd Rifle Division (Colonel Alexander Alekseyevich Zabaluev)
3rd Cavalry Corps Dovator (Major General Lev Dovator)
50th Cavalry Division, Major General Issa Pliyev
53rd Cavalry Division, Colonel Kondrat Semyonovich Melnik
30th Army (Major General Vasily Khomenko)
162nd Rifle Division (Colonel Nikolai Fyodorovich Kolkunov)
242nd Rifle Division (Major General Kyrill Alekseyevich Kovalenko)
250th Rifle Division (Colonel Pavel Afinogenovich Stepanenko)
251st Rifle Division (Colonel Vladimir Filippovich Stenin)
107th Motorized Division (Colonel Porfiry Georgiyevich Chanchibadze)
Operational Group Boldin (Lieutenant General Ivan Boldin)
152nd Rifle Division (Colonel Pyotr Nikolayevich Chernyshev)
101st Motorized Rifle Division (Colonel Grigory Mikhailovich Mikhailov)
126th Tank Brigade (Colonel Ivan Petrovich Kortschagin)
128th Tank Brigade (Lieutenant Colonel Pyotr Vladimirovich Shupilyuk)
143rd Tank Brigade (Colonel Nikolai Ivanovich Sumonov)
147th Tank Brigade (Colonel Ivan Ivanovich Kasanzev)
214th Rifle Division (Colonel Vasily Dmitriyevich Bunin)
19th Army (Lieutenant General Mikhail Lukin)
50th Rifle Division (Colonel Arkady Aleksandrovich Boreyko)
89th Rifle Division (Colonel Tit Fyodorovich Kolesnikov)
91st Rifle Division (Colonel Ivan Alekseyevich Volkov)
166th Rifle Division (Colonel Mikhail Yakovlevich Dodonov)
244th Rifle Division (Colonel Ivan Aleksandrovich Istomin)
45th Cavalry Division (Major General Nikolai Mikhailovich Dreyer)
16th Army (Lieutenant General Konstantin Rokossovsky)
38th Rifle Division (Colonel Maksim Gavrilovich Kirillov)
108th Rifle Division (Major General Nikolai Ivanovich Orlov)
112th Rifle Division (Colonel Ivan Andreyevich Kopyak)
214th Rifle Division (Colonel Vasily Dmitriyevich Bunin)
127th Tank Brigade (Major Fyodor Timofeyevich Remizov)
20th Army (Lieutenant General Filipp Yershakov)
73rd Rifle Division (Colonel Alexander Ivanovich Akimov)
129th Rifle Division (Lieutenant Colonel Fyodor Dmitriyevich Yablokov)
144th Rifle Division (Brigade Commander Mikhail Andreyevich Pronin)
229th Rifle Division (Major General Mikhail Ivanovich Kozlov)
Front troops
134th Rifle Division (Colonel Mikhail Arsentyevich Zashibalov)
5th Guards Rifle Division (Colonel Pavel Vasilyevich Mironov)
Reserve Front (Marshal Semyon Budyonny, Chief of Staff: Major General A. F. Anisov)
24th Army (Major General Konstantin Rakutin)
19th Rifle Division (Colonel Alexander Ivanovich Utvenko)
103rd Rifle Division (Major General Ivan Ivanovich Birichev)
106th Rifle Division (Colonel Aleksei Nikolayevich Pervushin)
139th Rifle Division (Major General Boris Dmitriyevich Bobrov)
170th Rifle Division (Colonel Nikolai Matveyevich Laskin)
309th Rifle Division (Colonel Nikifor Alekseyevich Ilyantsev)
144th Tank Brigade (Colonel Ivan Dmitriyevich Illarionov)
146th Tank Brigade (Major Stepan Afanasyevich Sevastyanov)
43rd Army (Major General Pyotr Sobennikov)
53rd Rifle Division (Colonel Nikolai Pavlovich Krasnoretskin)
149th Rifle Division (Major General Fyodor Dmitriyevich Zakharov)
211th Rifle Division (Major General Matvey Stepanovich Batrakov)
222nd Rifle Division (Colonel Fyodor Aleksandrovich Bobrov)
145th Tank Brigade (Colonel Yustin Fyodorovich Urban)
148th Tank Brigade (Lieutenant Colonel Alexander Ivanovich Potapov)
31st Army (Major General Vasily Dalmatov)
5th Rifle Division (Colonel Anisim Illarionovich Svetlyakov)
110th Rifle Division (Colonel Stepan Trofimovich Gladyshev)
119th Rifle Division (Colonel Alexander Dmitriyevich Beresin)
247th Rifle Division (Colonel Sergei Pavlovich Tarasov)
249th Rifle Division (Major General German Tarasov)
49th Army (Major General Ivan Zakharkin)
194th Rifle Division (Colonel Pavel Andreyevich Firsov)
220th Rifle Division (Colonel Nikifor Gordeyevich Khorushchenko)
248th Rifle Division (Major General Karl Swertschevski)
303rd Rifle Division (Colonel Nikolai Pavlovich Rudnev)
29th Cavalry Division (Colonel Yemelyan Parfenovich Serashev)
31st Cavalry Division (Lieutenant Colonel Mikhail Dmitriyevich Borisov)
32nd Army (Major General Sergey Vishnevsky)
2nd Rifle Division (Colonel Vladimir Romanovich Bashkevich)
8th Rifle Division (Colonel Grigory Aleksandrovich Sverev)
29th Rifle Division (Brigade Commander Ivan Vasilyevich Zaikin)
140th Rifle Division (Colonel Pavel Yefremovich Morozov)
33rd Army (Major General Dmitry Onuprienko)
17th Rifle Division (Brigade Commander Terenty Kirillovich Batsanov)
18th Rifle Division (Colonel Pyotr Kirillovich Shivalyov)
60th Rifle Division (Colonel Markye Bichmulovich Salikhov)
113th Rifle Division (Colonel Konstantin Ivanovich Mironov)
173rd Rifle Division (Colonel Alexander Vladimirovich Bogdanov)
Bryansk Front (Lieutenant General Andrey Yeryomenko, Chief of Staff: Major General Georgy Zakharov)
50th Army (Major General Mikhail Petrov)
217th Rifle Division (Colonel Mikhail Alekseyevich Grachev)
258th Rifle Division (Brigade Commander Kuzma Petrovich Trubnikov)
260th Rifle Division (Colonel Vasily Danilovich Khokhlov)
278th Rifle Division (Colonel Vasily Ivanovich Meleshko)
279th Rifle Division (Colonel Pavel Grigoryevich Sheludko)
290th Rifle Division (Colonel Nikolai Vasilyevich Ryakin)
299th Rifle Division (Colonel Ivan Fedotovich Seregin)
Front troops
287th Rifle Division (Colonel Yakov Petrovich Yeremin)
7th Guards Rifle Division (Colonel Afanasy Sergeyevich Gryaznov)
154th Rifle Division (Colonel Yakov Stepanovich Fokanov)
Operational Group Yermakov (Major General Arkady Yermakov)
121st Tank Brigade (Colonel Nikolai Radkevich)
150th Tank Brigade (Colonel Boris Bakharov)
127th (= 2nd Guards)-Rifle Division (Colonel Andrian Zakharovich Akimenko)
52nd Cavalry Division (Colonel Nikolai Petrovich Yakunin)
55th Cavalry Division (Major General Konstantin Gavrilovich Kalmykov)
160th Rifle Division (Colonel Mikhail Borisovich Anashkin)
283rd Rifle Division (Colonel Alexander Nikolayevich Nechayev)
3rd Army (Major General Yakov Kreizer)
137th Rifle Division (Colonel Ivan Grishin)
148th Rifle Division (Colonel Filipp Cherokmanov)
269th Rifle Division (Colonel Andrei Yevseyevich Chekharin)
280th Rifle Division (Major General Sergei Yevlampiyevich Danilov)
282nd Rifle Division (Colonel Mikhail Vasilyevich Grachev)
278th Rifle Division (Colonel Vasily Ivanovich Meleshko)
4th Cavalry Division (Colonel Teofan Agapovich Parkhomenko)
13th Army (Major General Avksenty Gorodnyansky)
6th Rifle Division (Colonel Mikhail Danilovich Grishin)
121st Rifle Division (Brigade Commander Pyotr Maksimovich Zykov)
132nd Rifle Division (Major General Sergei Semyonovich Biryuzov)
143rd Rifle Division (Major General Georgy Alekseyevich Kurnosov)
155th Rifle Division (Major General Pyotr Alekseyevich Aleksandrov)
298th Rifle Division (Colonel Mikhail Yemelyanovich Yerokhin)
307th Rifle Division (Colonel Vasily Grigoryevich Terentyev)
2nd Cavalry Corps Belov (Major General Pavel Belov)
5th Cavalry Division (Major General Viktor Kirillovich Baranov)
9th Cavalry Division (Major General Alexander Fyodorovich Bychkovsky)

== Course ==
=== Bryansk pocket ===
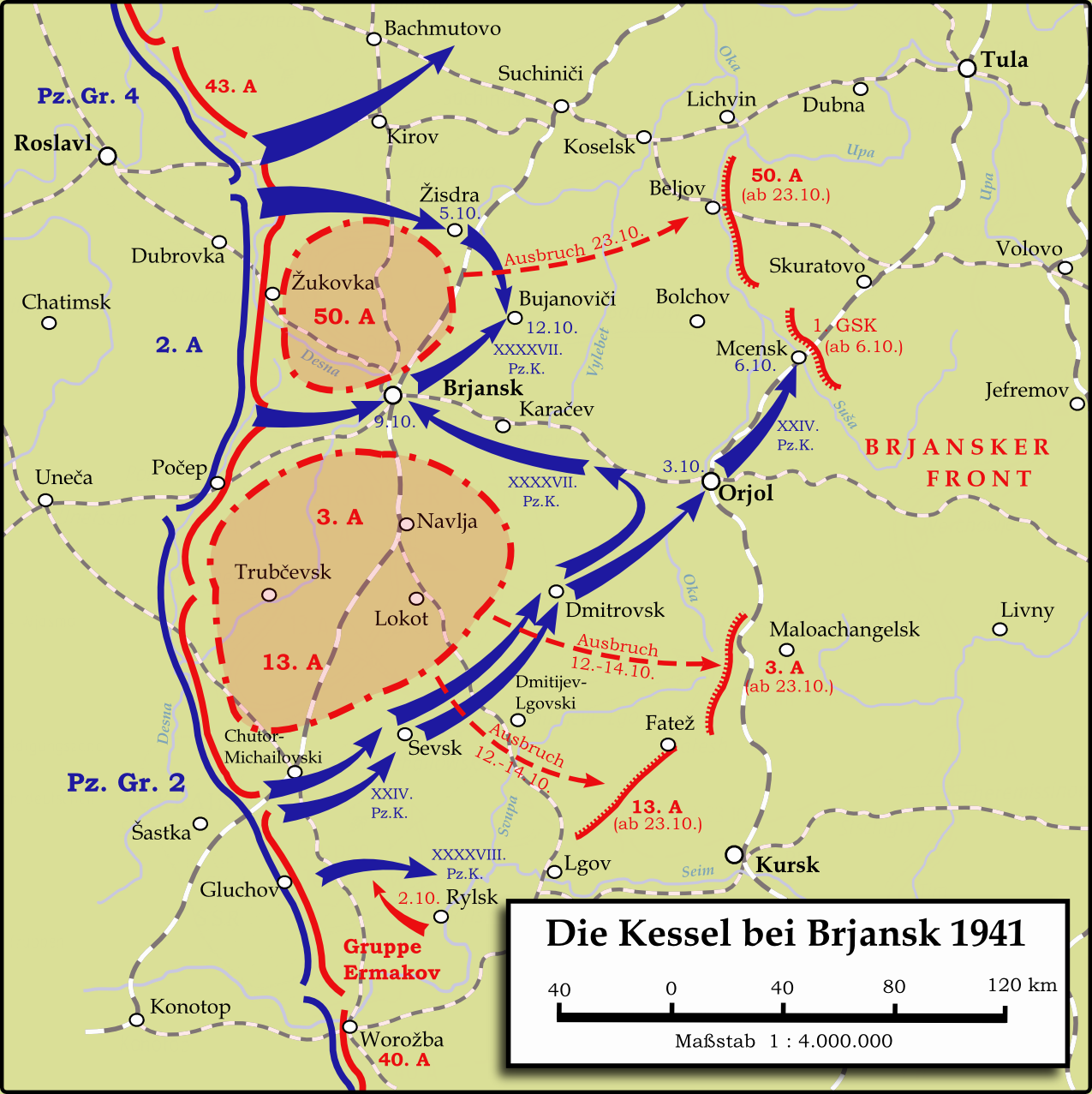

On September 30, the 2nd Panzer Group under Colonel General Guderian began its attack against the Bryansk Front east of Glukhov under the best weather conditions. By around 1:00 p.m. on October 1, the XXIV motorized Army Corps (AK (mot.)) had broken through the left flank of the Yermakov Group and advanced on Sevsk, while the XXXXVII AK (mot.) advanced on Karachev. Stalin and Chief of the General Staff B. M. Shaposhnikov ordered during the night to cut off the broken-in German formations by flank attacks of the 13th Army (Maj. Gen. Gorodnyansky) and the Yermakov Group. These isolated counterattacks of individual tank brigades did hit the German XXXXVIII motorized Army Corps used in the flank, whose advance was also slowed, but by the deployment of the 9th Panzer Division, the situation was quickly restored. On October 3, German vanguard formations of the 4th Panzer Division were able to take the strategically important, but due to omissions of the local commander Lt. Gen. A. A. Tyurin undefended Oryol. (Note: Tyurin had already been warned on September 30. In addition to some infantry formations, he had four anti-tank regiments and a howitzer regiment at his disposal. Nevertheless, German troops were able to surprisingly enter the city and occupy it. Cf. Yeremenko, A.I. (1961). Tage der Bewährung [Days of Probation] (in German). Berlin (East): Militärverlag der DDR. pp. 125f.)

The German 2nd Army under Colonel General Maximilian von Weichs advanced from October 2 against the right flank of the Bryansk Front and met there bitter resistance of the Soviet 3rd (Maj. Gen. J. G. Kreizer) and 50th Army (Maj. Gen. M. P. Petrov). Only with the breakthrough of the 4th Panzer Group through the further north located positions of the Soviet 43rd Army (Maj. Gen. P. P. Sobennikov, from October 10 Lt. Gen. Stepan Akimov) did the 2nd Army succeed in bypassing the Soviet front through the resulting gap. By October 5, it finally took Zhizdra. Almost simultaneously, from the south, the advance of the XXXXVII AK (mot.) via Karachev on Bryansk took place, which on October 6 was taken together with its important Desna bridges. Thus, the supply and communication lines of the Bryansk Front were cut off.

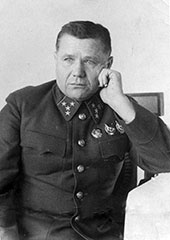
Lt. Gen. Yeryomenko (1938), commander of the Bryansk Front

On the Soviet side, greatest confusion prevailed in these days. Already the first German air attacks interrupted the connection between the front staff and the subordinate armies. The operational reserve group at Bryansk could not be used because it was soon attacked by German troops itself. Lt. Gen. Yeryomenko soon recognized the danger threatening his troops. He therefore requested from Chief of the General Staff Shaposhnikov in Moscow the permission to switch to a flexible defense with evasion possibilities. This was refused and Yeryomenko instructed to defend every meter of ground. On October 5, the commander of the Bryansk Front reported that he was forced to withdraw immediately to the east. However, he received no answer until the morning of October 6. At noon, German tanks appeared near his command post, so he had to flee with three tanks and some infantrymen. Thus, a unified leadership on the Soviet side was temporarily no longer given. The Stavka could no longer transmit the order to withdraw later. Since it assumed that Yeryomenko had fallen, it entrusted the commander of the 50th Army Maj. Gen. M. P. Petrov with the leadership of the front.

By October 9, a further advance of the 167th Inf Div (2nd Army) led to a union with the 17th Pz Div (2nd Panzer Army) (Note: After a Führer order, the Panzer Group was renamed "2nd Panzer Army" on October 6.) at Bryansk, whereby the ring around the Soviet 3rd and 13th Armies standing southwest around Trubchevsk closed. On the same day, Field Marshal von Bock ordered that the clearing of this pocket be transferred to the 2nd Panzer Army. The 2nd Army should take care of the destruction of the enemy standing to the north. In fact, it advanced further, and on October 12, a further pocket around the Soviet 50th Army could be closed at Buyanovichy. However, since both the 2nd Panzer and the 2nd Army had to advance with strong parts further east on order of the OKH and the Commander-in-Chief of the Army Group Centre without having previously "cleared" the pockets, only few forces were available for the encirclement of the enemy.

On October 12, 13 and 14, the Soviet armies broke out. The 3rd Army succeeded at the Navlya, the 13th Army at Khomutovka. The 50th Army, however, failed under heavy losses at the Resseta. Last Soviet groups succeeded only on October 22/23 in a breakout towards Belev. In the line Belev–Fatezh, Yeryomenko collected the Bryansk Front again between October 17 and 24. However, the troops had suffered enormous losses. Thus, the 13th Army had lost all its artillery and rear services during the breakthrough. In addition, the combat strength of its seven rifle divisions was only 1,500–2,000 men. The five rifle divisions of the 3rd Army had an average combat strength of only 2,000 men. The 50th Army, on the other hand, had been able to save some material. Lt. Gen. Yeryomenko had been wounded on October 12 and subsequently flown out. Maj. Gen. Petrov died during the fighting from the consequences of gangrene. German reports speak of 108,000 Soviet prisoners alone besides 257 tanks and 763 guns that were destroyed or captured. On the other hand, Lt. Gen. Yeryomenko reported later in his memoirs that the 3rd Soviet Army alone during its breakout had inflicted losses on the German troops of 5,500 dead and wounded, as well as 100 prisoners, 250 vehicles and 50 tanks.

=== Vyazma pocket ===
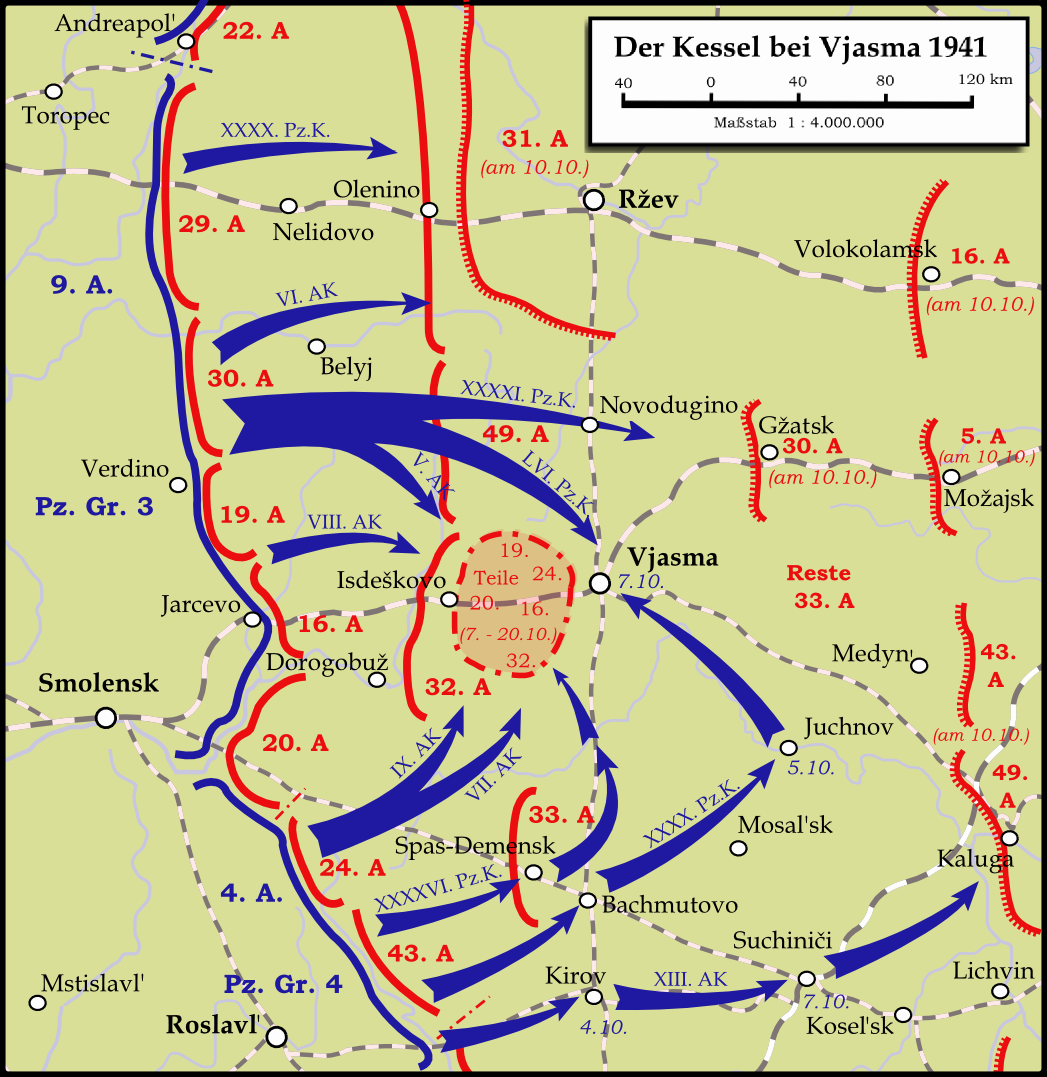

On October 2, the 3rd and 4th Panzer Groups as well as the 4th and 9th Armies also advanced to the offensive. The attack of the 4th Panzer Group of Colonel General Erich Hoepner broke through the Soviet defensive lines of the 43rd Army (Maj. Gen. P. P. Sobennikov) at the Desna in the morning at 5:30 a.m. The XL AK (mot.) advanced into the rear area and was able to take Kirov and Mosal'sk already on October 4 with the 10th Panzer Division, which was 110 km from the starting position. The next day Yukhnov also fell. In Moscow, the Stavka initially remained without news from the front. When the aviation forces of the 120th Fighter Regiment reported the advance of motorized columns on Yukhnov, their messages were not believed. The chief of the Moscow aviation forces Colonel Sbytov was even accused by the chief of the NKVD Lavrentiy Beria of "spreading panic". The breakthrough of the 4th Panzer Group was in the area of the Soviet Reserve Front of Marshal Budyonny. After he had already used his few reserves early, he reported to the Stavka on October 5: "The situation on the left flank of the Reserve Front is extremely serious. No forces are available for sealing the [...] breakthrough that has occurred. [...] The forces of the front are not sufficient to halt the enemy's attack [...]." Col. Gen. Hoepner could therefore operate relatively freely and first turned the XL AK (mot.) northwest towards Vyazma to meet there with the troops of the 3rd Panzer Group. On the left flank thereof, the XXXXVI AK (mot.) advanced against stronger Soviet resistance. It took Spas-Demensk on October 4 and was then turned north on instruction of the commander of the 4th Army, Field Marshal Günther von Kluge, to form the southern part of the planned pocket. The securing of the operations to the east was taken over by the LVI A.K. (mot.).

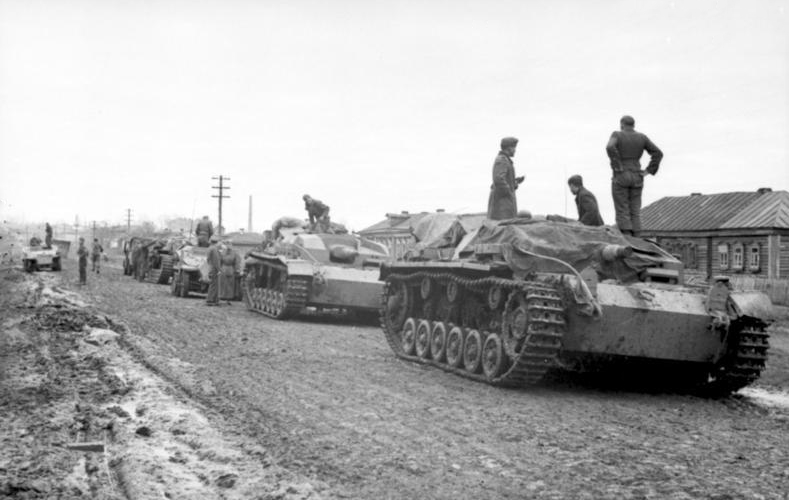
Assault guns of the 4th Army in the Vyazma area

The advance of the 3rd Panzer Group under Colonel General Hermann Hoth proved more difficult. Although it broke through the Soviet positions at the seam of the 19th (Lt. Gen. Lukin) and 30th Army (Maj. Gen. Khomenko) and established a bridgehead over the Dnieper on October 3, then Colonel General Konev used his operational group under I.V. Boldin (3 tank brigades; 1 motorized rifle division; 1 rifle division) to seal the German breakthrough. On October 3/4, it attacked at Kholm-Zhirkovsky. The place changed hands several times, but ultimately Lt. Gen. Boldin's troops had to withdraw. According to Soviet figures, 59 German tanks were destroyed. Now, however, supply bottlenecks in fuel occurred at the 3rd Panzer Group, whereby the advance of the armored divisions came to a halt. Only after supplies by the 2nd Air Fleet was the operational readiness restored in the afternoon of October 5. Meanwhile, the 4th and 9th Armies advanced behind the panzer groups to later relieve them at the pocket front. At the same time, however, they also attacked the Soviet positions frontally from the west to narrow the forming pocket.

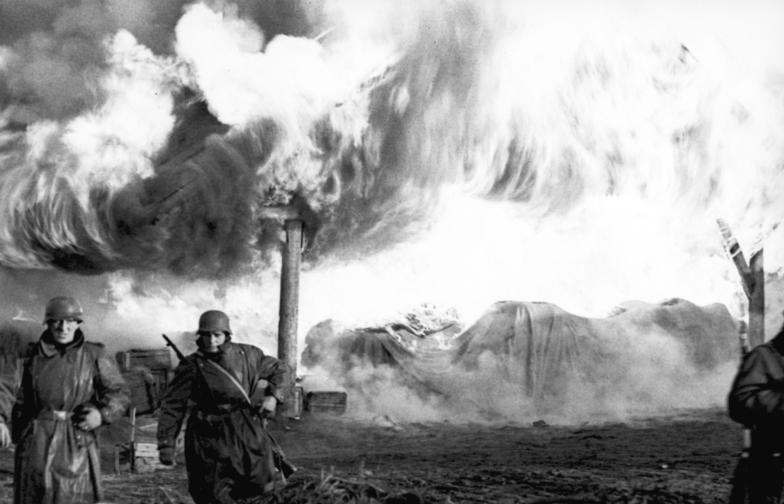
Soldiers of the 3rd Panzer Group in front of a burning village

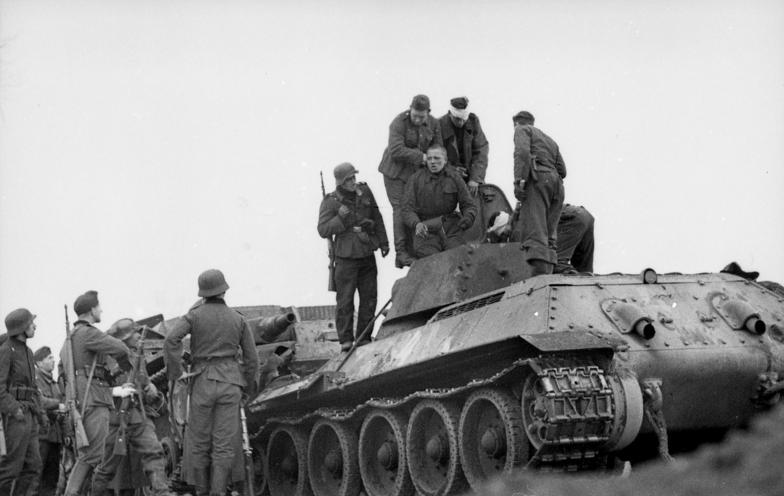
Soldiers of the 3rd Panzer Group capturing the crew of a Soviet T-34

After the counterattacks had failed, Colonel General Konev requested on October 4 to withdraw his front to the line Gzhatsk-Vyazma. But only in the afternoon of October 5 did the Stavka make a decision. Konev was allowed to withdraw to the line Rzhev-Vyazma. At the same time, it subordinated the 31st and 32nd Army of the Reserve Front to him to unify the leadership in the Vyazma area. But these two deeply echeloned formations were already involved in battles, so they failed as real reinforcement of the Western Front. A similar withdrawal order also reached the Reserve Front. Thus began a slow and disorganized withdrawal of the Soviet formations. The covering of the withdrawal was entrusted to the Boldin Group and the 31st Army, while the 22nd and 29th Army withdrew to Rzhev and Staritsa, the 49th and 43rd Army to Kaluga and Medyn. Since soon the connection to the Boldin Group and the 31st Army was lost, the leadership of the withdrawal and its covering was transferred to the 32nd Army of Maj. Gen. Vishnevsky. By October 7 at 10:30 a.m., however, Vyazma fell into the hands of the XL AK (mot.) of the 4th Panzer Group and in the course of the morning, the LVI AK (mot.) of the 3rd Panzer Group also arrived there. Thus, the pocket was closed.

In the encirclement were besides the Boldin Group the Soviet 19th Army (Lt. Gen. Lukin), 24th Army (Maj. Gen. Rakutin), 32nd Army (Maj. Gen. Vishnevsky) and the 20th Army (Lt. Gen. Yershakov). However, the troops of the 16th Army (Lt. Gen. Rokossovsky) had previously been incorporated into the latter, so that in total more than five armies were encircled. Lt. Gen. M.F. Lukin took over the supreme command of the encircled formations. He received only on October 10 and on October 12 each an instruction from the new commander of the Western Front Army General G.K. Zhukov with the order to break through to the east. However, these radio messages remained unanswered. In the first days, the breakout attempts were directed against the XL and XXXXVI AK (mot.) standing before Vyazma. When this had no success, Lt. Gen. Lukin shifted the attacks to the more unclear terrain in the south, where the heaviest attack took place in the night of October 10/11 against the German 11th Panzer Division. At least two divisions succeeded in breaking out of the encirclement. From October 12, these breakout attempts abated and in the following days only smaller groups succeeded in reaching the Soviet lines. On October 14, still before the "clearing" of the pocket, the 4th Panzer Group alone reported in its area 140,000 prisoners as well as 154 tanks and 933 guns that could be captured or destroyed. Lt. Gen. Lukin had the guns and vehicles blown up in the following days, before the mass of his troops went into German captivity by October 20, 1941.

=== Reorganization of the Soviet defense ===
On October 6, the State Defense Committee (GKO) met for a crisis session in view of the emerging destruction of three fronts and the threat to the capital. The committee determined the at least partially expanded position at Mozhaysk as the new defense line and instructed the Stavka to bring it into defensive condition as quickly as possible. Initially, four rifle divisions of the Western Front were ordered there to organize a makeshift defense. At the same time, all retreating formations and all available reserves were thrown into this position. On October 10, in addition to the four rifle divisions, three rifle regiments, five MG battalions and the classes of various military schools had gathered there. Further newly established five MG battalions, five tank brigades and ten anti-tank regiments (each of which had only battalion strength) were on the march. By mid-October, 11 rifle divisions, 16 tank brigades, 40 artillery regiments, in all about 90,000 men, had gathered at Mozhaysk. Gradually, further reinforcements from other front sections as well as Siberian rifle divisions arrived in the Moscow area. From these formations, the Stavka organized two new armies. In the area of Volokolamsk, a 16th Army was formed again under Lt. Gen. Rokossovsky and at Mozhaysk Maj. Gen. D. D. Lelyushenko took command of the 5th Army. After Lelyushenko's wounding, however, on October 18 Maj. Gen. L.A. Govorov became commander of the army. The troops of the 1st Guards Rifle Corps standing at Mtsensk formed the core for the formation of the 26th Army under General A. V. Kurkin. Into the new defense line, parts of the 33rd Army (Lt. Gen. M. G. Yefremov) could also withdraw at Naro-Fominsk and parts of the 43rd Army (Gen. Golubev) at Maloyaroslavets, parts of the 49th Army (Gen. I. G. Zakharkin) at Kaluga and. After their breakout, the remnants of the 3rd, 13th and 50th Armies (after Petrov's death commanded by Major General Yermakov) of the Bryansk Front could also be integrated into the frontline again.

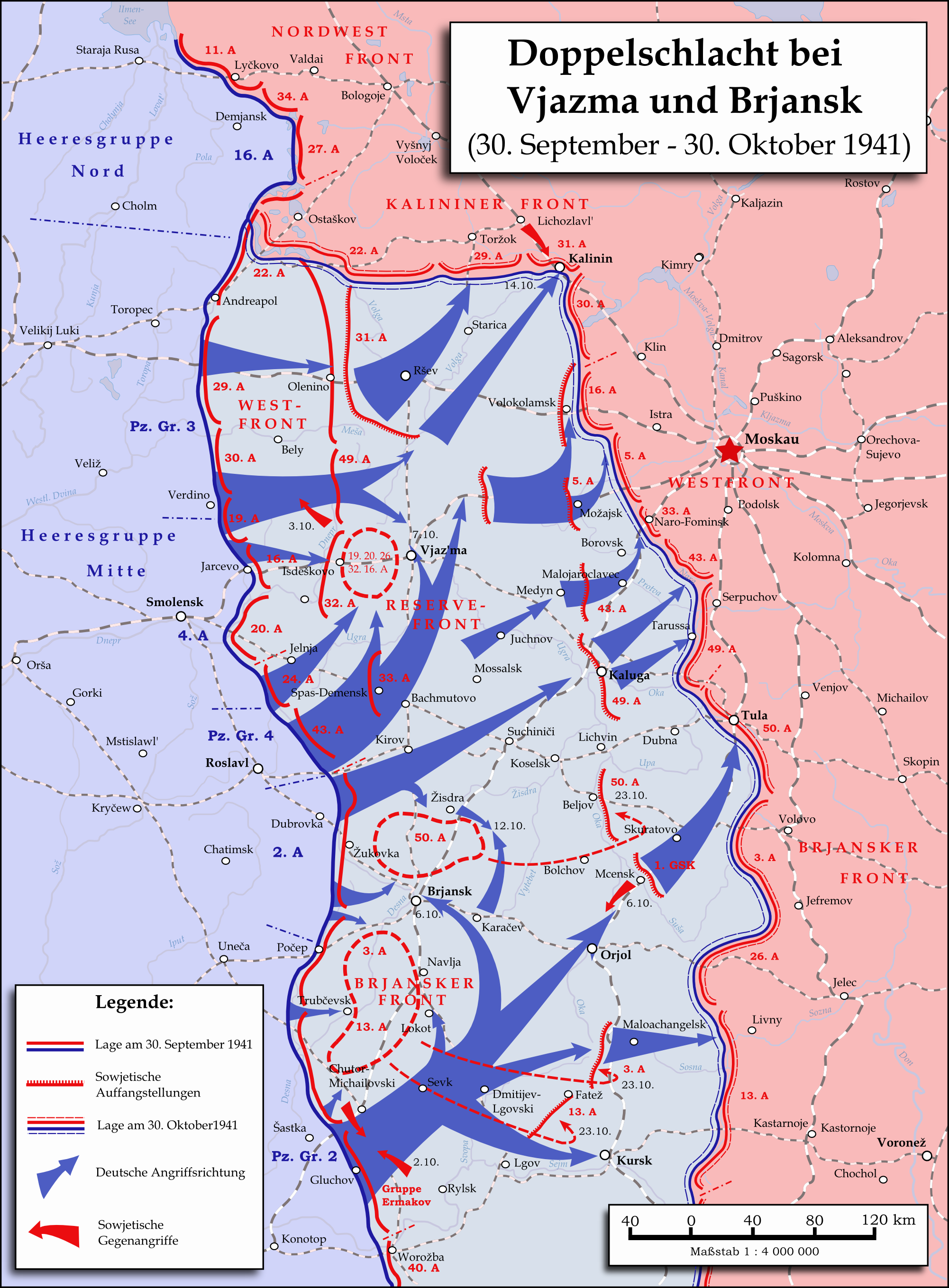

In a second step, the GKO tried to create order in the chaos of the military leadership. Initially, the troops gathered at Mozhaysk were summarized on October 9 as Front of the Mozhaysk Defense Line under Lt. Gen. P.A. Artemyev (chief of the Moscow Defense District). At the same time, a commission of the GKO, consisting of Molotov, Mikoyan, Malenkov, Voroshilov and Vasilevsky, went to the front to act there in the sense of the headquarters. Independent of this, Stalin also called the former Chief of the General Staff and previous commander of the Leningrad Front, Army General G.K. Zhukov, to Moscow to inspect and assess the critical front areas for him. These representatives found chaos at the front. Thus, no one in the staff of the Reserve Front could say where their commander was. In Medyn, an access possibility to Moscow, no defense was organized except for three soldiers. The three fronts had no contact with each other and often they had also lost the connection to their armies. The Stavka reacted by reorganizing the supreme leadership. On October 9, Army General Zhukov took over the leadership of the Western Front. This was also subordinated the troops of the Reserve Front on the following day and on October 12 the formations of the Front of the Mozhaysk Defense Line. Thus, the defense troops were under a unified command. On October 17, there was a change insofar as the Soviet 22nd, 29th and 30th Armies in the area of Kalinin were summarized to a new Kalinin Front and subordinated to Colonel General Konev to unify the leadership in this sector.

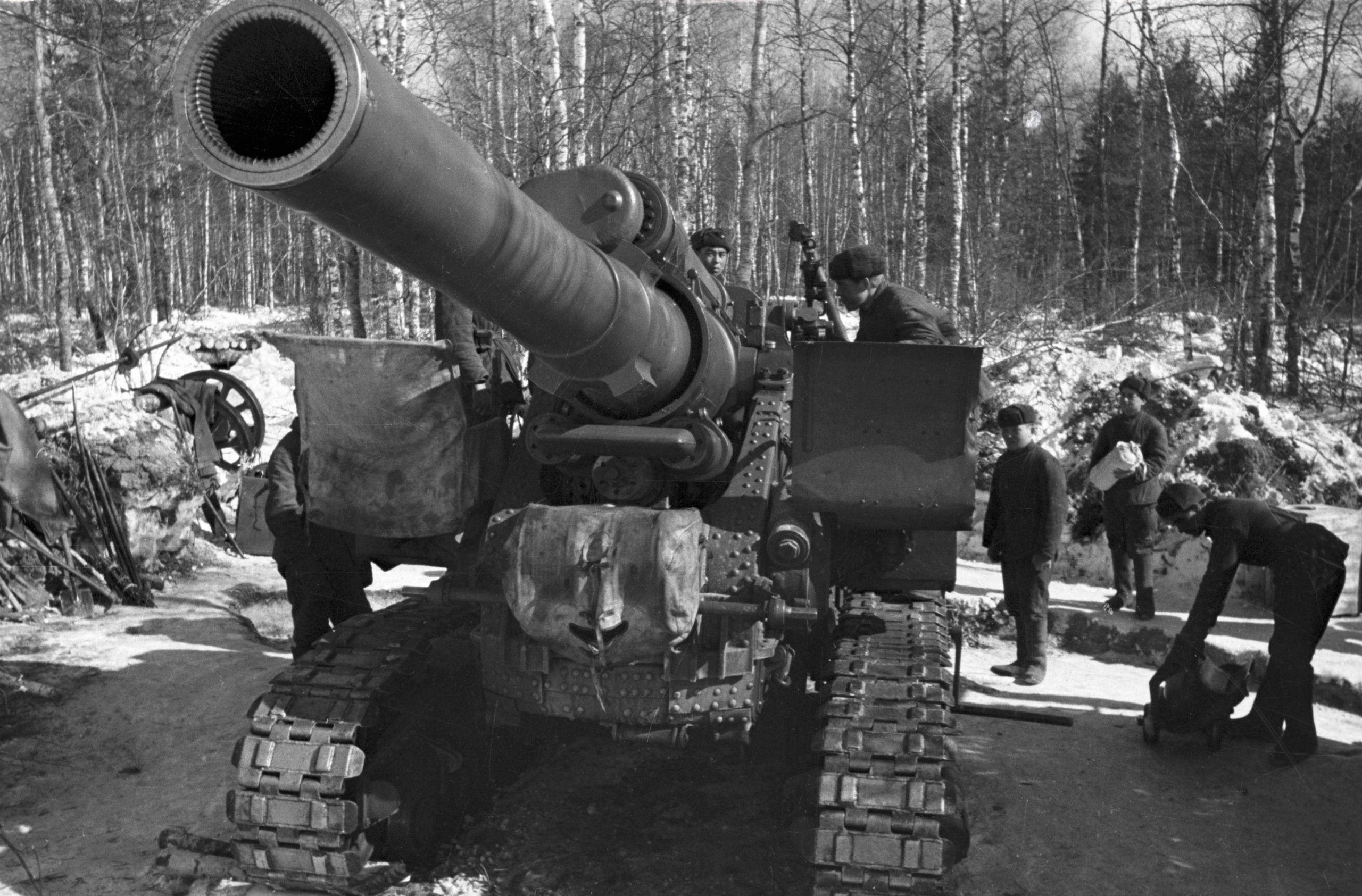
Heavy howitzer M1931, October 1941

Since his troops were numerically weak and battered, Army General Zhukov tried to stabilize the front with all means. In his Order No. 0345 of October 13, 1941, he demanded full commitment from all soldiers and announced: "Cowards and panic-mongers who leave the battlefield, who abandon the occupied positions without permission, who throw away their weapons and equipment, are to be shot on the spot." To compensate for the loss of motor vehicles, he also had all available vehicles in the Moscow area requisitioned. The beginning mud period also favored the Soviet defense. Zhukov quickly recognized that the Wehrmacht formations could only advance on the paved roads. He therefore concentrated the few available formations on the few paved access roads to Moscow at Volokolamsk, Istra, Mozhaysk, Maloyaroslavets, Podolsk and Kaluga. The strongly decimated formations of the Bryansk Front, which defended the road Oryol-Tula with emphasis, proceeded similarly. At the same time, the commander of the Rear Services of the Red Army, General A.V. Khrulev, ordered to form supply formations with panje wagons, since the mud also brought the Soviet supply to a halt and supply aircraft were not available in sufficient number. This measure helped to overcome the supply crises on the Soviet side.

=== German pursuit operations ===
Even during the fights for the pockets, the German troops proceeded to exploit the gaps they had punched in the Soviet lines. This corresponded to the plans of the OKH and the Commander-in-Chief of the Army Group Centre. Thus, Field Marshal von Bock had ordered the 2nd Panzer Group immediately after the capture of Oryol on October 4 "to take possession of Mtsensk ... " and if possible to advance towards Tula. The Stavka had meanwhile taken measures to prevent a German breakthrough via Tula towards Moscow. It relocated 5,500 soldiers to Mtsensk by air transport. Other reserves also arrived there. When finally the 5th and 6th Guards Rifle Divisions, the 4th and 11th Tank Brigades, the 5th Airborne Corps, the 36th Motorcycle Rifle Regiment and a worker regiment from Tula were assembled at Mtsensk, these formations were summarized as 1st Guards Rifle Corps under the command of Lt. Gen. D.D. Lelyushenko (who took over the 5th Army a few days later). When the 4th Panzer Division arrived before Mtsensk on October 6, it ran into an ambush of the 4th Tank Brigade (Colonel Mikhail Katukov), which was equipped with superior T-34s. The 4th Panzer Division suffered heavy losses and had to withdraw. Only on October 12 could it finally take Mtsensk without being able to advance further. The pocket battles themselves also delayed the German advance. According to an army group order of October 4, the pockets should only be cleared by a part of the 2nd Panzer Group, but soon it showed that the 2nd Army was also necessary for this. The breakout attempts of the Bryansk Front also prevented a reinforcement of the German pursuit forces in the following days.

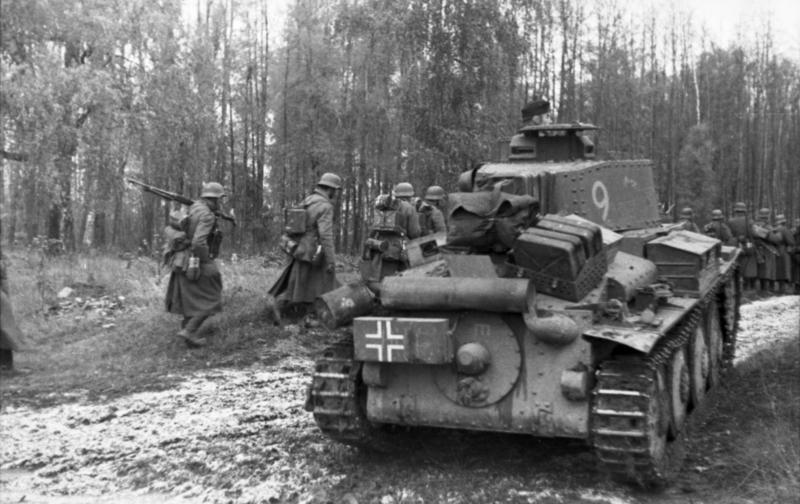
Troops of the 4th Panzer Group during the advance

At Vyazma, it was important to relieve the 3rd and 4th Panzer Groups, which had closed the pocket on October 7, by the infantry forces of the 4th and 9th Armies and thus make them available for a further advance towards Moscow. But these armies advanced only slowly due to tenacious Soviet resistance. After the closure of the pocket, OKH and the High Command of the Army Group Centre were of the opinion that the enemy had no significant forces left for the defense of Moscow. On October 7, Colonel General Halder and Field Marshal von Bock met at the headquarters of the army group. It was decided to seize the opportunity immediately. Field Marshal von Bock was convinced that he was strong enough to clear the pockets and at the same time advance on Moscow. Only about the direction of the pursuit was there disagreement. In the OKH, one was of the opinion that the enemy was so weak that it was sufficient to pursue him only with a part of the forces towards Moscow. Hitler demanded the capture of Kursk by the 2nd Panzer Army. In addition, the 3rd Panzer Group and parts of the 9th Army should be diverted north to destroy the Soviet forces in the area of Ostashkov in cooperation with the Army Group North. Field Marshal von Bock did not agree with this splitting of his forces, but the next day a Führer order fixed the turning of the 3rd Panzer Group as soon as the pocket battles allowed it. The XLI AK (mot.) therefore shortly thereafter advanced on Kalinin. The 4th Panzer Group remained bound to the front of the Vyazma pocket with its XXXVI and XL AK (mot.) until mid-October. Thus, finally, only the LVII AK (mot.) (19th and 20th Pz Div 3rd Inf Div (mot.)) as well as the XII and XIII AK were available for the pursuit to Moscow.

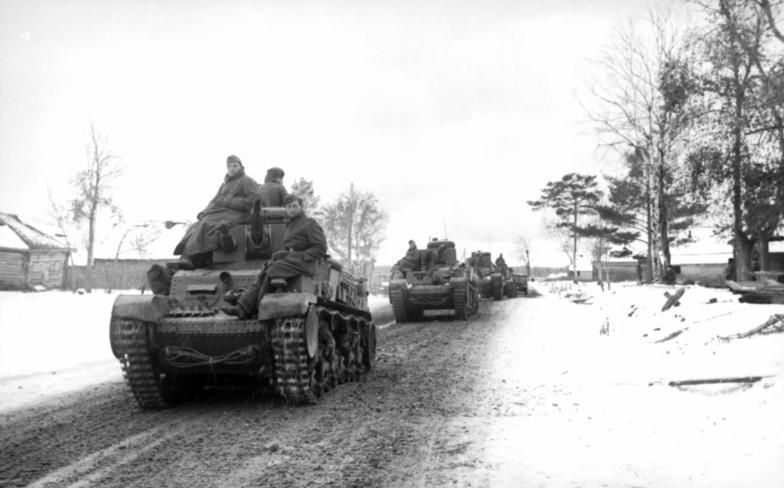
Tank of the 3rd Panzer Group advancing on Kalinin

On October 11, the German pursuit forces could first take Medyn and the next day Kaluga, with which they had already broken into the Mozhaysk defense line. They could exploit these successes to also take Tarusa and bypass Maloyaroslavets. Thereafter, heavy fighting developed in the area of Borovsk between the LVII AK (mot.) and the Soviet 110th Rifle Division and 151st Motorized Rifle Brigade, which lasted until October 16. The Germans are said to have lost 20 tanks alone, before the Soviets had to withdraw to Naro-Fominsk. After Maloyaroslavets had also fallen, the Soviet 43rd Army had to withdraw behind the Nara on October 18. North of that, Mozhaysk itself fell to the German troops after a six-day fight and the loss of allegedly 60 tanks.

Although Kalinin had also fallen on October 14, the German forces could hardly advance further against the stiffening resistance of the Soviet formations, as on the German side, sufficient pursuit forces could not yet be freed due to the ongoing pocket battles. These could only start the pursuit with mass from October 15. But by then, especially the armored formations had suffered sensitive losses. The 6th Pz Div had only 60 tanks left, the 20th Pz Div had lost 43 of its 283 tanks. The 4th Pz Div had only 38 tanks left after the lossy fights against the 1st Guards Rifle Corps before Mtsensk. The Army Group Centre had lost 47,430 soldiers and 1,791 officers in the time from the beginning of the operations to October 17. The weakened formations encountered in their pursuit a motivated enemy in built positions. Not a few units reported the "hardest fights since the beginning of the Eastern Campaign" (war diary of the LVII AK (mot.)). Soon the bad weather conditions would also hinder the German operations.

=== Stalling of the offensive ===
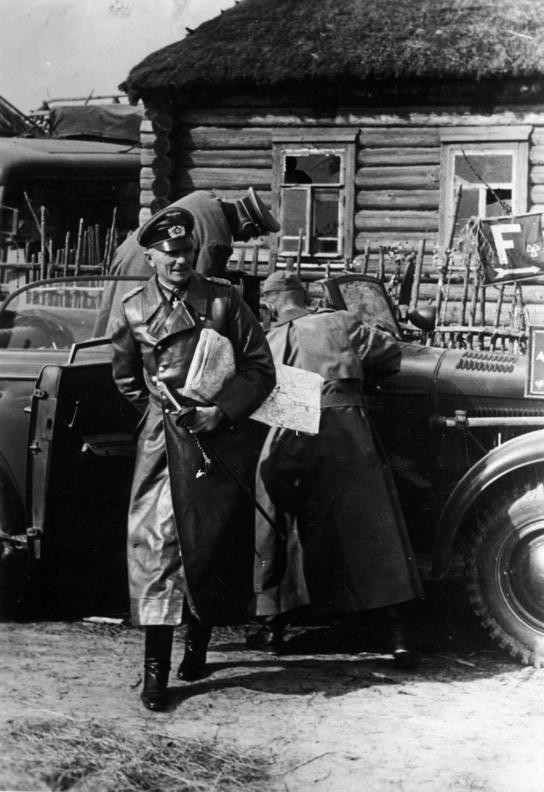
Field Marshal von Bock during a front visit during the operation

On October 6/7, the first snow fell in the area of the 2nd Panzer Army, which quickly muddied the paths. In the next night, heavy autumn rain fell in the entire area of the Army Group Centre. Thus, the time of the Russian Rasputitsa ("roadlessness") was ushered in, which greatly hindered the German operations in the following time. In the headquarters of the Army Group Centre, it was noted already on October 9: "Movement of the armored units off the main roads is not possible at present due to bottomless and bad roads as a result of the bad weather. Thereby also fuel difficulties." The Rasputitsa affected the conduct of operations only from October 13, since from this time the supply with fuel and ammunition could no longer be ensured.

From mid-October, the 2nd Panzer Army could no longer advance and also the pursuit formations of the 2nd Army were stuck. The Panzer Army reported on October 12 that its motorized formations could only advance 1 km per hour. An orderly supply was soon no longer possible. This state, as the headquarters of the 2nd Army noted on October 18, would last "as long as the supply is not rebuilt". The 4th Army also could not advance further, as it was itself pressed by constant Soviet counterattacks. It stopped the advance of its right flank on October 16. In the area of the 9th Army and 3rd Panzer Group, the formations were dependent on the Vyazma-Moscow highway, but this route was heavily damaged by numerous demolitions, bomb damage and overcrowding. Finally, on October 19, the entire 5th Infantry Division had to be used for repair work on the highway. In addition, the 3rd Panzer Group was also forced into the defense by counterattacks of the Kalinin Front. The formations of the 2nd Air Fleet were also increasingly unable to intervene in the fighting due to the bad weather. Field Marshal von Bock noted, after practically all attack movements had to be stopped on October 19/20, on October 25 in his diary:

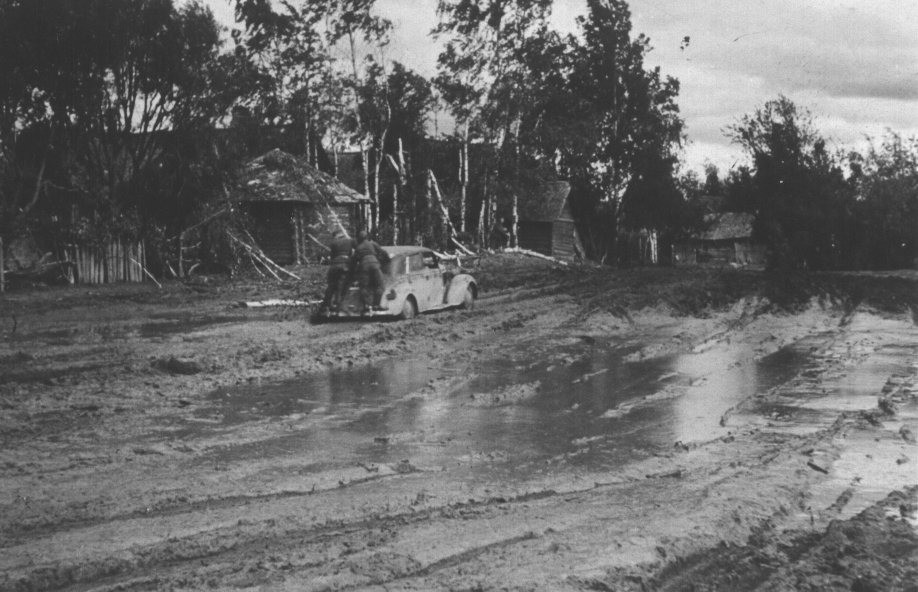
Effects of the autumn rains before Moscow

The tearing apart of the army group in connection with the terrible weather has led to us being stuck. Thereby the Russian gains time to replenish his battered divisions and strengthen the defense [...] That is very bad.

— Field Marshal von Bock

The only terrain gains could still be achieved in the area of the Bryansk Front, and this only because its right flank was no longer covered by the German successes against the Western Front. To close the almost 60 km wide gap, the Stavka therefore ordered on October 24 to withdraw the armies of the Bryansk Front to the line Dubna-Plavsk-Verkhovye-Livny-Kastornoye. This withdrawal began on October 26 and was largely completed four days later. When the 2nd Panzer Army took up the pursuit and from October 29 tried to take the city of Tula, it met strong Soviet resistance of the 50th Army there. From this, some fights developed, especially in the flank of the Panzer Army, which lasted until November 7, but ran without result.

In view of the hopeless situation, Field Marshal von Bock gave the order on November 1, 1941, "that for the time being no further advance will be made on a large scale, but that everything will be prepared for the attack and supply difficulties will be remedied as quickly as possible, so that with the onset of good weather (frost) the advance can be made immediately." Thus, the German "Operation Typhoon" had practically come to an end.

== Consequences of the battle ==
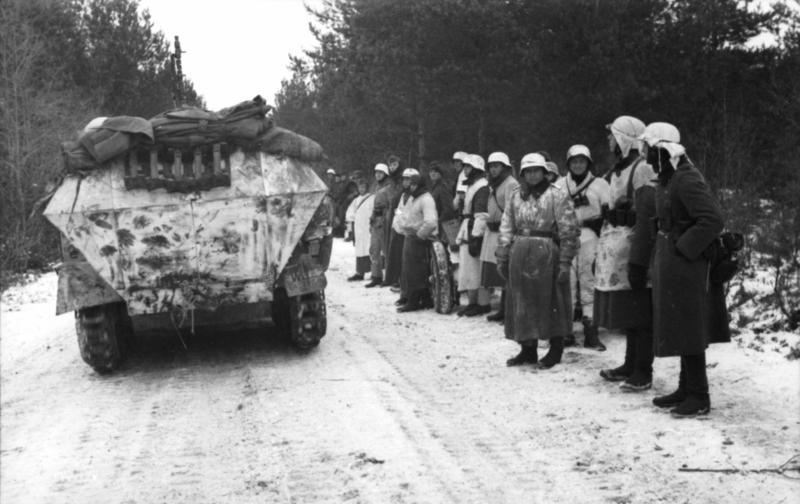
Soldiers of the 4th Panzer Group at the end of October in improvised winter clothing

Although both Hitler and the Wehrmachtführungsstab as well as the General Staff of the OKH fell into an optimistic mood after the first successes in "Operation Typhoon" and already drew up plans for further operations with far-reaching goals beyond Moscow, the offensive had stalled by the end of October 1941. (Note: Thus, the 3rd and 4th Panzer Groups should advance to Vologda and the 2nd Panzer Army reach Gorki. While the 2nd Army should be turned to Voronezh, only the 4th Army remained for the capture of Moscow. The farthest of these goals were up to 600 km from the starting position. For these plans and the differences of opinion about them see: Reinhardt, Klaus (1972). Die Wende vor Moskau – Das Scheitern der Strategie Hitlers im Winter 1941/42 [The Turning Point before Moscow – The Failure of Hitler's Strategy in the Winter of 1941/42] (in German). Stuttgart: Deutsche Verlags-Anstalt. pp. 82–86.) Also, Hitler had already issued orders on October 12 for the treatment of Moscow, which was to be encircled and then shelled and whose capitulation, even if offered, was not to be accepted. Instead, the German advance had come to a halt about 80 km before the Soviet capital. Neither the primary goal, the destruction of the mass of the enemy forces, nor the secondary goal of capturing Moscow had been achieved.

However, the Red Army had suffered great losses. Since exact Soviet figures are missing, one is dependent on German sources such as the Wehrmacht report, which after the conclusion of the fights for the pockets reported the destruction of 67 Soviet rifle, 6 cavalry and 7 armored divisions with 1,242 tanks and 5,412 guns as well as the capture of 663,000 Red Army soldiers. Since according to Soviet figures less than 100,000 soldiers were available for the protection of Moscow in mid-October, this representation is plausible.

In Moscow itself, the events led to a crisis. On October 13, the chairman of the Moscow City Committee, A.S. Shcherbakov, publicly declared that the capital was threatened. In the course of this, thousands of Muscovites were used for the expansion of the defense facilities around the city and 25 worker battalions of 12,000 volunteers were set up, which occupied these positions from October 17. Nevertheless, Stalin decided on October 16 to evacuate the city, so that most organizations of the government, the party and the military began to relocate to Kuibyshev. Industrial enterprises were also evacuated. Thereupon, a panic broke out in the capital, which was not curbed by the fact that Stalin decided to stay in Moscow. Many inhabitants fled and there were plunderings of the scarce food. Therefore, on October 19, the state of siege was declared and martial law imposed.

In the first two weeks of November, which were characterized by a largely standstill of operations, both sides replenished their weakened formations. Neither side succeeded in completely replacing their previous losses, especially not the Wehrmacht with its very long supply lines. While a number of German front commanders spoke out for now going over to the defense and choosing a favorable position for the winter months, in the OKH one was of the opinion that only one last "act of strength" was needed to achieve the goal of the campaign against the Soviet Union after all. After the entry of the frost period, in which the paths became better passable, the decision was made during a meeting of the highest military commanders in Orsha on November 13 to renew the attack. On November 17, 1941, the renewed German offensive began with the Battle of Moscow. Also in this attempt, the Wehrmacht should not succeed in a decisive success. On December 5, the Red Army went over to the counteroffensive with its reserves and could regain large parts of the territory lost in the autumn until the spring of 1942.

== Assessment and reception ==
Measured by the height of the losses, the pocket battles at Vyazma and Bryansk were one of the greatest military defeats of the Soviet Union during World War II. In Russian historiography, it is almost always counted as part of the "Battle of Moscow" (Битва за Москву), which finally ended with a Soviet success. Thereby, attempts were occasionally made to find the causes for this first setback. In addition to emphasizing the numerical superiority of the Wehrmacht formations, some commanders such as I.S. Konev or K.K. Rokossovsky pointed out in their memoirs that there had been serious omissions on the part of the high command in Moscow. Marshal Vasilevsky criticized especially the confused command structure:

The failure at Vyazma is not only to be explained by the enemy's superiority and the lack of reserves, but also by the fact that the General Staff and the headquarters had incorrectly determined the main thrust direction of the enemy and accordingly also built the defense incorrectly. [...] The operational structure was extremely unfavorable for the troop leadership and the cooperation of the fronts.

— A.M. Vasilevsky

In the official Soviet representation of the war, this was not addressed and claimed that the Stavka or the State Defense Committee had learned of the German plans too late and therefore could no longer undertake anything. Nevertheless, the historian Joachim Hoffmann summarized in 1983: "The errors and omissions of the Soviet leadership are in any case an essential reason why Army Group Centre was able to break through the defense at the decisive points relatively quickly."

In the first Soviet publications after World War II, the encirclement and destruction of a large part of the Red Army was sometimes not mentioned at all. Later, however, especially the resistance of the Soviet formations in the Vyazma pocket experienced heroization. Both in the official representation and in the memoirs of Zhukov or Vasilevsky, one found the statement that the sacrifice of the five encircled armies had been necessary for the salvation of the capital. That the supreme German military leadership actually directed a large part of the available forces (parts of Pz Gr 3 and the 9th Army) north against Kalinin, instead of advancing with them on the equally distant Moscow, remained unmentioned. Also the later Soviet historiography emphasized that through the resistance of the encircled troops finally German divisions were bound for about two weeks and thus prevented from breaking through to Moscow:

But the combat actions of the encircled troops required the use of 28 divisions of the enemy, whereby time was gained for the organization of the defense on the Mozhaysk line. The fights at Vyazma bound the main forces of Bock's panzer groups and armies in that critical time, when his individual corps and divisions advanced into the gaps that had arisen at Moscow and when the aggressor had no closed defense before him for a short time.

— A.M. Samsonow (historian)

On the German side, there were numerous "inaccuracies" in the later representation of the operations. Thus, some commanders, such as Heinz Guderian, falsely claimed that the encircled 50th Army had capitulated already on October 17 and the Bryansk pocket had been cleared by October 20. He left unmentioned the successful breakout of parts of the 3rd, 13th and 50th Soviet Armies from the pocket. In other representations, the capitulation of the Vyazma pocket was dated to October 13. In fact, the major breakout attempts ended with October 12, but the last encircled troops capitulated only seven days later, which in the meantime bound significant German forces. The newer research has tried to correct these errors, but nevertheless the adopted wrong dates are found in numerous publications.

In the memoir literature of the postwar years, especially Hitler's and the OKH's decision to turn the 3rd Panzer Group and large parts of the 9th Army to Kalinin evoked great criticism. Thus, for example, Walter Chales de Beaulieu, formerly chief of staff of the 4th Panzer Group, wrote after the war:

The XLI (northern) Corps of this Panzer Group was not involved with its fast divisions in the Vyazma encirclement ring, was conveniently available from October 8 for further advance to the east, on Moscow, north of the highway – distance Vyazma, Moscow only 200 km! – could have advanced further on this particularly suitable operational line and probably encountered no insurmountable resistance at that time. If one considers that this corps – set to the north – already reached Kalinin on October 13, which is also only 200 km from Vyazma, but leads to much less favorable roads, one can imagine legitimate prospects for a success before Moscow as well.

— W. Chales de Beaulieu

In addition, in German historiography, the thesis is often found that the unusually early weather change had surprised the German troops and this circumstance had led to a failure of the operation. In fact, the German leadership believed it could ignore the Rasputitsa, which it expected for mid-October, since the operations should then be concluded. Specialists from the meteorological department were not involved in the planning. However, the precipitations of October remained below the average values, so that the autumn of 1941 was relatively dry. In addition, the frost set in even earlier than usual, which shortened the mud period once again. As the mud period in 1941 was thus shorter and drier than usual, the thesis of the surprising weather change can be seen as an attempt "to attribute the guilt of one's own failure to a higher power".

== Literature ==
=== Sources ===
- Chales de Beaulieu, Walter (1969). Generaloberst Erich Hoepner [Colonel General Erich Hoepner] (in German). Neckargemünd: Scharnhorst Buchkameradschaft.
- Guderian, Heinz (1951). Erinnerungen eines Soldaten [Memories of a Soldier] (in German). Heidelberg: Kurt Vowinckel Verlag.
- Yeremenko, A. I. (1961). Tage der Bewährung [Days of Probation] (in German). Berlin (East): Deutscher Militärverlag.
- Zhukov, G. K. (1969). Gedanken und Erinnerungen [Thoughts and Memories] (in German). Stuttgart: Deutsche Verlags-Anstalt.
- von Plato, Anton Detlev (1978). Die Geschichte der 5. Panzerdivision 1938 bis 1945 [The History of the 5th Panzer Division 1938 to 1945] (in German). Regensburg: Walhalla und Praetoria.

=== Secondary literature ===
- Erickson, John (2003). The Road to Stalingrad. London: Cassell. ISBN 978-0-304-36541-8.
- Glantz, David M.; House, Jonathan (1995). When Titans clashed – How the Red Army stopped Hitler. Lawrence: University Press of Kansas. ISBN 978-0-7006-0899-7.
- Hoffmann, Joachim (1983). "Die Kriegführung aus der Sicht der Sowjetunion" [The Conduct of War from the Soviet Perspective]. Der Angriff auf die Sowjetunion [The Attack on the Soviet Union] (in German). Stuttgart: Deutsche Verlags-Anstalt. pp. 713–809. ISBN 3-421-06098-3.
- Isaev, A. B. (2005). Котлы 41-го. – История ВОВ, которую мы не знали [Pockets of '41. – History of the Great Patriotic War that We Did Not Know] (in Russian). Moscow: Yauza Eksmo. ISBN 5-699-12899-9. (Online-Version)
- Klink, Ernst (1983). "Die Operationsführung" [The Operational Leadership]. Der Angriff auf die Sowjetunion [The Attack on the Soviet Union] (in German). Stuttgart: Deutsche Verlags-Anstalt. pp. 451–712. ISBN 3-421-06098-3.
- Муриев, Д. З. (1978). "Вяземская операция" [Vyazma Operation]. Советская военная энциклопедия [Soviet Military Encyclopedia] (in Russian). Vol. 2. Moscow: Voenizdat. (Online-Version)
- Pospelow, P. N., ed. (1963). Geschichte des Großen Vaterländischen Krieges der Sowjetunion [History of the Great Patriotic War of the Soviet Union] (in German). Vol. 2. Berlin (East): Deutscher Militärverlag.
- Reinhardt, Klaus (1972). Die Wende vor Moskau – Das Scheitern der Strategie Hitlers im Winter 1941/42 [The Turning Point before Moscow – The Failure of Hitler's Strategy in the Winter of 1941/42] (in German). Stuttgart: Deutsche Verlags-Anstalt. ISBN 3-421-01606-2. (= Beiträge zur Militär- und Kriegsgeschichte. Volume 13)
- Samsonow, Aleksandr M. (1959). Die große Schlacht vor Moskau [The Great Battle before Moscow] (in German). Berlin (East): Verlag des Ministeriums für Nationale Verteidigung.
- Stahel, David (2013). Operation Typhoon: Hitler's March on Moscow, October 1941. Cambridge: Cambridge University Press. ISBN 978-1-107-03512-6.
