= LXXXII Army Corps =

German army Corps during WW II

The LXXXII Army Corps (German: LXXXII. Armeekorps) was an army corps of the German Wehrmacht during World War II. It was formed in 1942 and existed until 1945.

== History ==
The LXXXII Army Corps was created on 25 May 1942 from the renamed Höheres Kommando z. b. V. XXXVII, which had in turn been created on 20 October 1939 from the Grenzschutz-Abschnittkommando 30 and additionally served since 1 July 1940 as Befehlshaber der Truppen in Holland.

The initial commander of the LXXXII Army Corps was Alfred Böhm-Tettelbach. The corps, assigned to the 15th Army under Army Group D, was originally headquartered at Aire-sur-la-Lys. Böhm-Tettelbach was replaced as corps commander by Ernst Dehner on 1 November 1942. Dehner was in turn replaced by Johann Sinnhuber on 10 July 1943.

The corps remained on defensive duty in France until the Normandy landings of June 1944. By the end of August 1944, the corps had been transferred to the 1st Army and deployed in the Loire region. Walter Hörnlein became the commander of the corps on 7 September 1944. The corps was subsequently driven back to the Saar region.

After a transfer to the 7th Army, the LXXXII Army Corps, now under command of Walter Hahm, was deployed in Hesse and Thuringia in April 1945, shortly before German surrender. Its final commander was Theodor Tolsdorff, who had only held that post since 20 April 1945. Before him, Walther Lucht had held command of the LXXXII Army Corps for five days between 15 April and 20 April 1945.

== Structure ==
Organizational chart of the LXXXII (82nd) Wehrmacht Army Corps
Year	Date	Commander	Subordinate units	Army	Army Group	Operational area
1942	8 June	Alfred Böhm-Tettelbach	106th Infantry, 304th Infantry, 306th Infantry, 321st Infantry	15th Army	Army Group D	Northern France (Aire-sur-la-Lys)
1942	4 July	Alfred Böhm-Tettelbach	106th Infantry, 304th Infantry, 306th Infantry, 321st Infantry, 712th Infantry	15th Army	Army Group D	Northern France (Aire-sur-la-Lys)
1942	5 August	Alfred Böhm-Tettelbach	23rd Infantry, 39th Infantry, 65th Infantry, 106th Infantry, 304th Infantry, 306th Infantry, 321st Infantry, 712th Infantry	15th Army	Army Group D	Northern France (Aire-sur-la-Lys)
1942	2 September	Alfred Böhm-Tettelbach	23rd Infantry, 106th Infantry, 304th Infantry, 306th Infantry, 321st Infantry	15th Army	Army Group D	Northern France (Aire-sur-la-Lys)
1942	8 October	Alfred Böhm-Tettelbach	26th Panzer (former 23rd Infantry), 106th Infantry, 304th Infantry, 306th Infantry, 321st Infantry	15th Army	Army Group D	Northern France (Aire-sur-la-Lys)
1942	5 November	Ernst Dehner	106th Infantry, 304th Infantry, 306th Infantry, 321st Infantry	15th Army	Army Group D	Northern France (Aire-sur-la-Lys)
1942	1 December	Ernst Dehner	39th Infantry, 106th Infantry, 161st Infantry, 182nd Infantry	15th Army	Army Group D	Northern France (Aire-sur-la-Lys)
1943	1 January	Ernst Dehner	39th Infantry, 106th Infantry, 161st Infantry, 182nd Infantry	15th Army	Army Group D	Northern France
1943	3 February	Ernst Dehner	39th Infantry, 106th Infantry, 161st Infantry, 182nd Infantry	15th Army	Army Group D	Northern France
1943	4 March	Ernst Dehner	39th Infantry, 156th Infantry, 161st Infantry, 171st Infantry, 282nd Infantry	15th Army	Army Group D	Northern France
1943	9 April	Ernst Dehner	156th Infantry, 161st Infantry, 171st Infantry, 191st Infantry, 282nd Infantry, 18th LFD	15th Army	Army Group D	Northern France
1943	1 May	Ernst Dehner	156th Infantry, 191st Infantry, 18th LFD	15th Army	Army Group D	Northern France
1943	1 June	Ernst Dehner	156th Infantry, 191st Infantry, 18th LFD	15th Army	Army Group D	Northern France
1943	7 July	Ernst Dehner	156th Infantry, 191st Infantry, 18th LFD	15th Army	Army Group D	Northern France
1943	5 August	Johann Sinnhuber	156th Infantry, 191st Infantry, 18th LFD	15th Army	Army Group D	Northern France
1943	5 September	Johann Sinnhuber	156th Infantry, 191st Infantry, 18th LFD	15th Army	Army Group D	Northern France
1943	4 October	Johann Sinnhuber	156th Infantry, 191st Infantry, 18th LFD	15th Army	Army Group D	Northern France
1943	8 November	Johann Sinnhuber	156th Infantry, 191st Infantry, 18th LFD	15th Army	Army Group D	Northern France
1943	3 December	Johann Sinnhuber	156th Infantry, 191st Infantry, 18th LFD	15th Army	Army Group D	Northern France
1944	1 January	Johann Sinnhuber	156th Infantry, 191st Infantry, 18th LFD	15th Army	Army Group D	Northern France
1944	12 February	Johann Sinnhuber	47th Infantry, 49th Infantry, 182nd Infantry, 18th LFD	15th Army	Army Group D	Northern France
1944	11 March	Johann Sinnhuber	47th Infantry, 49th Infantry, 18th LFD	15th Army	Army Group D	Northern France
1944	8 April	Johann Sinnhuber	47th Infantry, 49th Infantry, 18th LFD	15th Army	Army Group D	Northern France
1944	11 May	Johann Sinnhuber	47th Infantry, 49th Infantry, 18th LFD	15th Army	Army Group B	Northern France
1944	12 June	Johann Sinnhuber	47th Infantry, 49th Infantry, 18th LFD	15th Army	Army Group B	Northern France
1944	17 July	Johann Sinnhuber	47th Infantry, 49th Infantry, 18th LFD	15th Army	Army Group B	Northern France
1944	31 August	Johann Sinnhuber	352nd Infantry	1st Army	Army Group B	Loire / Champagne
1944	16 September	Walter Hörnlein	19th Infantry. 36th Infantry, 559th Infantry	1st Army	Army Group G	Saarland
1944	13 October	Walter Hörnlein	19th Infantry, 416th Infantry, 462nd Infantry	1st Army	Army Group G	Saarland
1944	5 November	Walter Hörnlein	19th Infantry, 49th Infantry, 416th Infantry, 462nd Infantry, 17th SS	1st Army	Army Group G	Saarland
1944	26 November	Walter Hörnlein	21st Panzer, 19th Infantry, 416th Infantry	1st Army	Army Group G	Saarland
1944	31 December	Walter Hahm	416th Infantry	1st Army	Army Group G	Saarland
1945	19 February	Walter Hahm	256th Infantry, 416th Infantry	1st Army	Army Group G	Saarland
1945	1 March	Walter Hahm	2nd Mountain, 6th SS, 256th Infantry, 416th Infantry	1st Army	Army Group G	Saarland
1945	12 April	Walter Hahm	21st Flak, 36th Infantry, 256th Infantry, 416th Infantry	7th Army	Army Group G	Hesse / Thuringia

== Noteworthy individuals ==
- Alfred Böhm-Tettelbach, corps commander of the LXXXII Army Corps (27 May 1942 – 31 October 1942).
- Ernst Dehner, corps commander of the LXXXII Army Corps (1 November 1942 – 10 July 1943).
- Johann Sinnhuber, corps commander of the LXXXII Army Corps (10 July 1943 – 7 September 1944).
- Walter Hörnlein, corps commander of the LXXXII Army Corps (7 September 1944 – 1 December 1944).
- Walter Hahm, corps commander of the LXXXII Army Corps (1 December 1944 – 15 April 1945).
- Walther Lucht, corps commander of the LXXXII Army Corps (15 April 1945 – 20 April 1945).
- Theodor Tolsdorff, corps commander of the LXXXII Army Corps (20 April 1945 – May 1945).
