= 282nd Division =

282nd Division may refer to:

- 282nd Infantry Division, Wehrmacht, Germany
- 282nd Rifle Division, Soviet Union

== See also ==
- List of military divisions by number
