= 282nd Infantry Division =

German Army World War II military unit

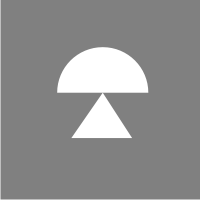
282nd Infantry Division unit marking

The 282nd Infantry Division (German: 282. Infanterie-Division) was an infantry division of the German Heer during World War II. It existed between 1943 and 1944.

== Operational history ==
The 282nd Infantry Division was formed on 1 March 1943 following an order from 31 December 1942. It was created using parts of the 165th and 182nd Reserve Divisions near Cherbourg in occupied France. The staff had formerly been part of the 182nd Infantry Division. Initially, the division was subordinate to LXXXII Army Corps of 15th Army under Army Group D, the army group that oversaw the occupation of France. The division was transferred to the Eastern Front in May 1943 and became part of XXXXII Army Corps under Army Group South.

During the Soviet counterattack ("Operation Rumyantsev") against the German Kursk offensive, the 282nd Infantry Division fell under heavy pressure by 57th Army.

In January 1944, the division was reequipped as Division neuer Art 44 and was soon after strengthened with parts of the dissolved 39th Infantry Division. The division was destroyed in August 1944 while fighting as part of 6th Army. Following its destruction, the division was formally dissolved on 9 October 1944. The remaining parts of the divisions were used to replenish the forces of the 76th Infantry Division and to assist the redeployment of the 15th Infantry Division.

== Organizational history ==
Initially part of LXXXII Army Corps of 15th Army under Army Group D, the division was under XXXXII Army Corps (Army Group South) during its initial deployment to the Eastern Front. It joined XXXXVII Army Corps (8th Army) in December 1943, before it was shuffled to XXXX Army Corps from March until April 1944. At the time of its destruction in August 1944, it was part of XXXXIV Army Corps (6th Army (Army Group South)).

== Noteworthy Individuals ==
- Franz Karl, divisional commander from 1 March 1943.
- Wilhelm Kohler, divisional commander from 1 April 1943.
- Hermann Frenking, divisional commander from 15 August 1943.
