= Ernst Dehner =

Nazi German Wehrmacht general (1889–1970)

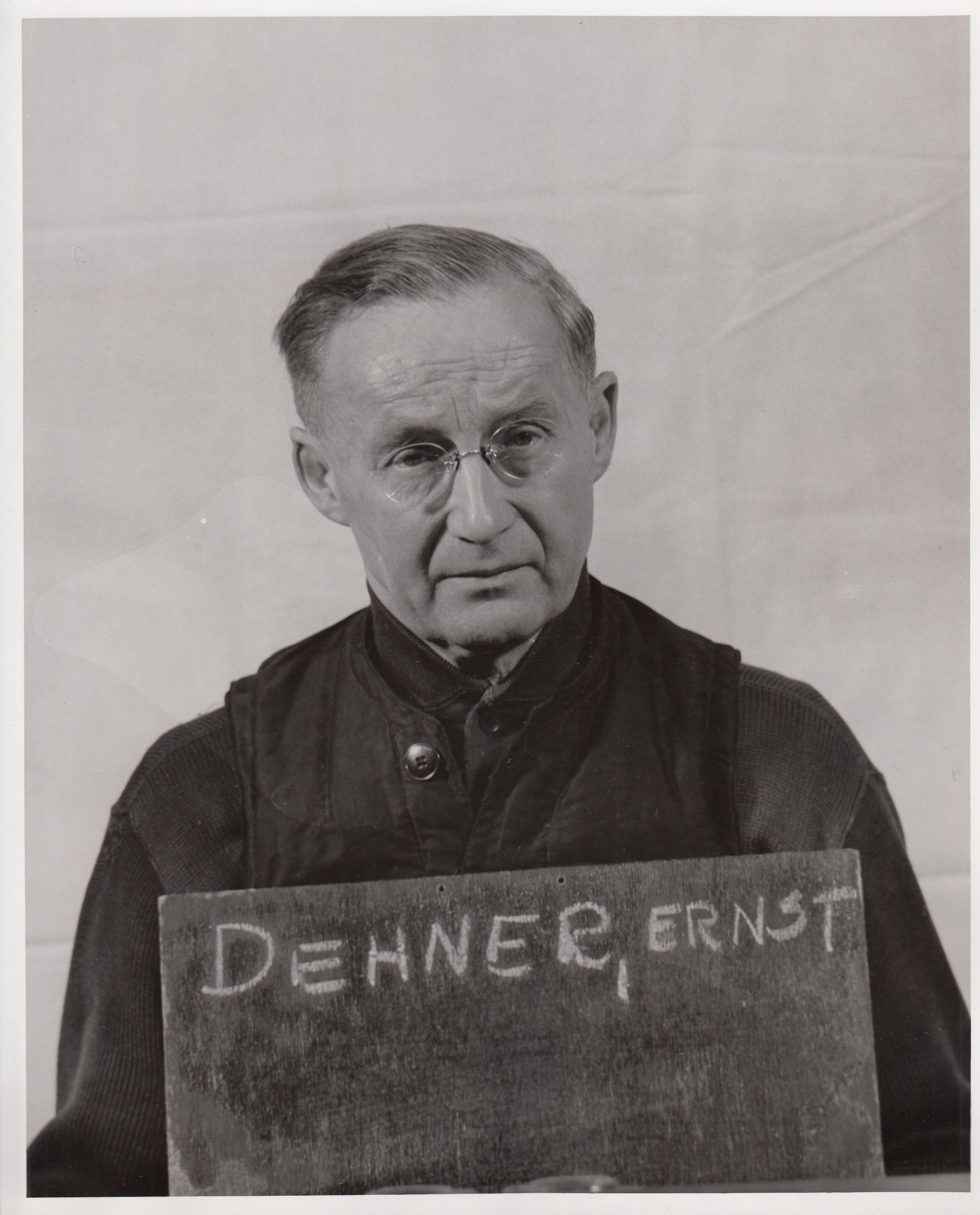
- Dehner at the Hostages Trial in 1948
- Born: 5 March 1889; Hersbruck, German Empire
- Died: 13 September 1970 (aged 81); Königstein im Taunus, West Germany
- Military career
- Allegiance: German Empire; Weimar Republic; Nazi Germany
- Branch: German Army
- Service years: 1914–1945
- Rank: General der Infanterie
- Commands: 106th Infantry Diviison; LXXXII Army Corps
- Conflicts: World War I; World War II; Battle of France; Operation Barbarossa; Battle of Białystok–Minsk; Battle of Smolensk (1941); Battle of Moscow
- Awards: Knight's Cross of the Iron Cross

Ernst Dehner (5 March 1889 – 13 September 1970) was a general in the Wehrmacht of Nazi Germany during World War II. He was a recipient of the Knight's Cross of the Iron Cross. In 1948 he was found guilty of war crimes at the Hostages Trial and was sentenced to seven years imprisonment, but was released in 1951.

== Awards and decorations ==
- Knight's Cross of the Iron Cross on 18 October 1941 as Generalmajor and commander of 106. Infanterie-Division

Military offices
Preceded by Oberst Kurt von der Chevallerie	Commander of Infanterie-Regiment 87; 12 November 1936 – 14 November 1940	Succeeded by Oberst Walter Fries
Preceded by None	Commander of 106. Infanterie-Division; 28 November 1940 – 3 May 1942	Succeeded by Generalleutnant Alfons Hitter
Preceded by General der Infanterie Alfred Böhm-Tettelbach	Commander of LXXXII. Armeekorps; 31 October 1942 – 1 April 1943	Succeeded by General der Pioniere Erwin Jaenecke
Preceded by General der Pioniere Erwin Jaenecke	Commander of LXXXII. Armeekorps; 1 June 1943 – 10 July 1943	Succeeded by General der Artillerie Johann Sinnhuber
Preceded by None	Commander of LXIX. Armeekorps; 20 January 1944 – 31 March 1944	Succeeded by General der Gebirgstruppen Julius Ringel
