= Hugo Höfl =

German general (1878–1957)

- Born: 16 June 1878
- Died: 13 April 1957 (aged 79)
- Military career
- Allegiance: German Empire; Weimar Republic; Nazi Germany
- Branch: German Army
- Service years: 1897–1929; 1935–1943
- Rank: Generalleutnant (Lieutenant general)
- Commands: 206th Infantry Division; 39th Infantry Division; LXXXIX Army Corps
- Conflicts: World War I; World War II; Invasion of Poland; Battle of France; Operation Barbarossa; Battle of Białystok–Minsk; Battle of Smolensk (1941); Battle of Moscow; Battles of Rzhev
- Awards: Knight's Cross of the Iron Cross

Hugo Höfl (16 June 1878 – 13 April 1957) was a German lieutenant general during World War II. He was a recipient of the Knight's Cross of the Iron Cross of Nazi Germany. Höfl retired from active duty in April 1943.

== Awards ==
- Knight's Cross of the Iron Cross on 4 December 1941 as Generalleutnant and commander of 206. Infanterie-Division

Military offices
Preceded by None	Commander of 206. Infanterie-Division; 1 September 1939 – 10 July 1942	Succeeded by Generalleutnant Alfons Hitter
Preceded by None	Commander of 39. Infanterie-Division; 10 July 1942 – 30 December 1942	Succeeded by Generalleutnant Ludwig Löweneck
Preceded by General der Panzertruppe Dr. Alfred Ritter von Hubicki	Commander of LXXXIX. Armeekorps; 30 December 1942 – April 1943	Succeeded by General der Panzertruppe Dr. Alfred Ritter von Hubicki
