= Walther Hahm =

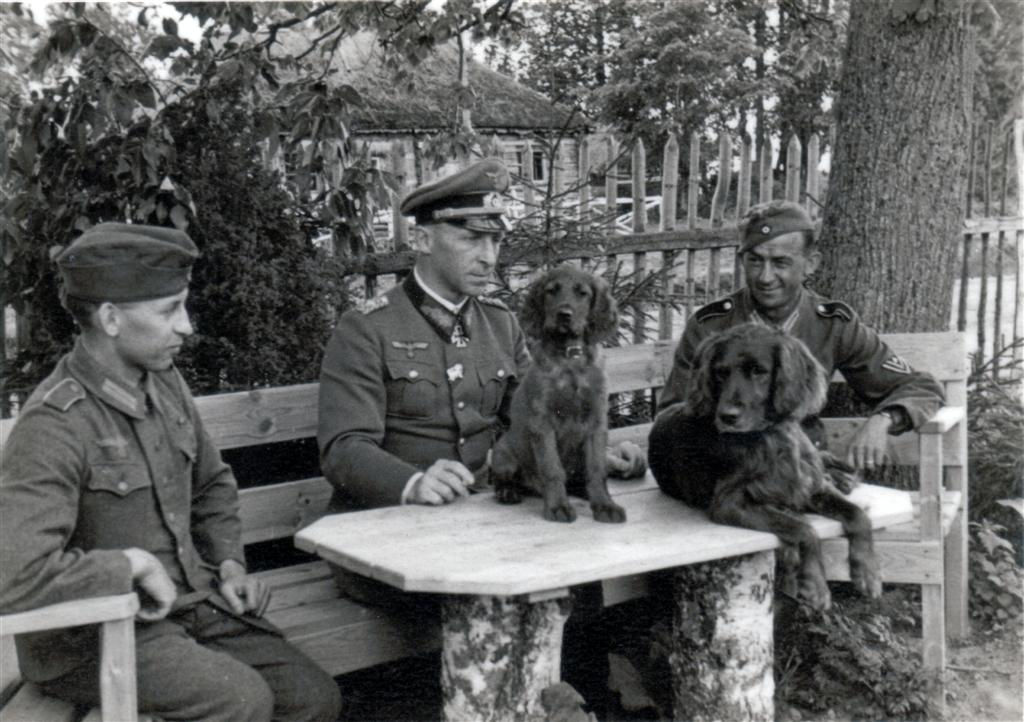
- Hahm (center) in May 1943
- Born: 21 December 1894; Neudorf-Sulau, Kreis Militsch-Trachenberg, Regierungsbezirk Breslau, Province of Silesia, Kingdom of Prussia, German Empire
- Died: 21 December 1951 (aged 57); Heide, Schleswig-Holstein, West Germany
- Military career
- Allegiance: German Empire; Weimar Republic; Nazi Germany
- Branch: Prussian Army; Imperial German Army; Reichsheer; German Army
- Service years: 1914–1945
- Rank: General of the Infantry
- Commands: 260. Infanterie-Division; 389th Infantry Division; LXXXII. Armeekorps; XIII Army Corps
- Conflicts: World War I World War II: Battle of France; Operation Barbarossa; Battle of Kiev (1941); Battle of Moscow; Lower Dnieper Offensive
- Awards: Knight's Cross of the Iron Cross with Oak Leaves

Walther Karl Otto Hahm (21 December 1894 – 11 August 1951) was a German general during World War II who held several commands at division and corps level. He was a recipient of the Knight's Cross of the Iron Cross with Oak Leaves of Nazi Germany.

== Post-WWII ==
With the surrender of the Wehrmacht, Hahm became an Allied prisoner of war. He was released in 1947. In the course of the investigations for the Nuremberg Trials, in response to certain accusations against his division, Hahm gave a sworn statement as a witness on 23 June 1946 in Neu-Ulm:

"The deposition of the Chief of the General Staff of the 4th Army, General Hans Röttiger, is incomprehensible to me. The 260th Division, fighting in the 4th Army area, had constantly to defend itself from about March to August 1942 against gang (German: Banden) attacks in the zone behind the lines. Namely in the region north of the road Roslawl–Juchnow. An "extermination order” of the 4th Army against the gangs respectively the partisans is not known to me. On the contrary, the partisans captured at that time were, according to orders of superior commands, either sent to prisoner camps or used as labor detachments."

== Death ==
General (Ret.) Walther Hahm died of leukemia on 11 August 1951 in Heide (Holstein) and was buried in Bövergeest Cemetery, St. Peter-Ording (Eiderstedt, North Frisia). At his own request, he shares the grave with a “simple” soldier (Paul Kaminsky, † 1943).

== Awards and decorations ==
- Iron Cross (1914), 2nd and 1st Class
  - 2nd Class on 3 December 1914
  - 1st Class on 4 September 1917
- Military Merit Cross (Austria-Hungary), 3rd Class with War Decoration (ÖM3K) on 6 April 1918
- Honour Cross of the World War 1914/1918 with Swords on 27 December 1934
- Wehrmacht Long Service Award, 4th to 1st Class
  - 2nd Class on 2 October 1936
  - 1st Class (25-year Service Cross) on 7 August 1939
- Repetition Clasp 1939 to the Iron Cross 1914, 2nd and 1st Class
  - 2nd Class on 27 May 1940
  - 1st Class on 12 June 1940
- Winter Battle in the East 1941–42 Medal on 8 July 1942
- Knight's Cross of the Iron Cross with Oak Leaves
  - Knight's Cross on 15 November 1941 as Oberst and Commander of the Infanterie-Regiment 480
  - 676th Oak Leaves on 9 December 1944 as Generalleutnant and Commander of the 389. Infanterie-Division

== Sources ==
- German Federal Archives: BArch PERS 6/173 and PERS 6/299777

Military offices
Preceded by Generalleutnant Hans Schmidt	Commander of the 260. Infanterie-Division; 1 January 1942 - 27 August 1942	Succeeded by Generalmajor Dietrich von Choltitz
Preceded by Generalmajor Paul Herbert Forster	Commander of the 389. Infanterie-Division; 1 April 1944 - 30 September 1944	Succeeded by Generalleutnant Fritz Becker
Preceded by General der Infanterie Walter Hörnlein	Commander of the LXXXII. Armeekorps; 30 January 1945 – 1 April 1945	Succeeded by Generalleutnant Theodor Tolsdorff
Preceded by Generalleutnant Max Bork	Commander of the XIII. Armeekorps; 15 April 1945 - 20 April 1945	Succeeded by General der Artillerie Walther Lucht
