= 206th Infantry Division (Wehrmacht) =

206. Infanterie-Division; German 206th Infantry Division
- Active: 17 August 1939 – 18 July 1944
- Country: Nazi Germany
- Branch: Army
- Type: Infantry
- Size: Division
- Engagements: World War II: invasion of Poland; Operation Typhoon; Operation Mars; Operation Bagration

Alternative Emblem of this Division

The German 206th Infantry Division (German designation 206. Infanterie-Division, nickname Pique As, 'Ace of spades', after the divisional emblem), was a military unit that served during World War II. Like most German infantry units it had no motorization, and relied on leg and horse mobility.

== History ==
The 206th Infantry Division was raised on 17 August 1939 in Insterburg, East Prussia. It served during the invasion of Poland in 1939 as a reserve division for Army Group North.

The 206th Infantry Division participated in Operation Typhoon as part of the XXIII Corps under the Ninth Army. At this time, the division was under the command of Lieutenant General Hugo Höfl.

At the time of the Soviet Rzhev-Vyazma strategic offensive operation (8 January – 20 April 1942), Operation Mars, the division now led by Lieutenant General Alfons Hitter was again serving in XXIII Corps under the Ninth Army in the Molodoi Tud sector of the Rzhev salient. Here it came under attack by the Soviet 39th army of the Kalinin Front.

The division is known to have used Marder Is from January 1943 to December 1943.

In mid-1944, the division, still under the command of Lieutenant General Alfons Hitter, was one of those defending the Vitebsk salient as part of 3rd Panzer Army's LIII Corps. The Soviet offensive, Operation Bagration, which commenced on 22 June, saw the entire corps encircled within a matter of days, after Soviet breakthroughs around the city. While the Oberkommando des Heeres, after realising the situation was hopeless, reluctantly authorised a breakout operation by the other three divisions involved, the 206th was ordered to stay in Vitebsk and fight to the last man.

By 26 June, Soviet forces had fought their way into the city, and General Gollwitzer, LIII Corps' commander, ordered the 206th to withdraw in defiance of the OKH orders. It was too late, however, and almost all the soldiers of the division were killed or taken prisoner. Its commander, Hitter, went on to join the NKFD in Soviet captivity.

== Commanders ==
1 September 1939 Generalleutnant Hugo Höfl

10 July 1942 Generalleutnant Alfons Hitter

13 July 1943 Generalmajor Carl André

14 September 1943 Generalleutnant Alfons Hitter

== Component units ==
On formation:

- 301st, 312th, and 413th Infantry Regiments
- Artillery Regiment (Artillerie-Regiment) 206
- Engineer Battalion (Pionier-Bataillon) 206
- Anti Tank Battalion (Panzerabwehr-Abteilung) 206
- Reconnaissance Battalion (Aufklärungs-Abteilung) 206
- Infantry Division Signals Battalion (Infanterie-Divisions-Nachrichten-Abteilung) 206
- Infantry Division Chief Supply Staff (Infanterie-Divisions-Nachschubführer) 206

Changes to composition:

- 5 January 1940 the Anti-Tank Battalion was dissolved leaving a single Anti-Tank company.
- July 1942 Mobile Battalion (Schnelle Abteilung) 206 was added, becoming Fusilier Battalion 206 (Füsilier-Bataillon) 206 on 10 September 1943.
- 15 October 1942 Infanterie-Regiments 301, 312 and 413 became the Grenadier-Regiments 301, 312 and 413.
- 24 April 1943 Grenadier-Regiment 312 was dissolved and the assets distributed to the other regiments of the division which were maintained at three battalions each.
- 1 December 1943 A new anti-tank battalion (Panzerjäger-Abteilung) was added.

By late 1943 the division was formed:

- Grenadier-Regiment 301, Grenadier-Regiment 413
- Artillerie-Regiment 206
- Füsilier-Bataillon 206
- Pionier-Bataillon 206
- Panzerjäger-Abteilung 206
- Infanterie-Divisions-Nachrichten-Abteilung 206
- Infanterie-Divisions-Nachschubführer 206

== See also ==
- List of German divisions in World War II
- Order of battle of the German Ninth Army, October 1941
