= Johann Sinnhuber =

- Born: 27 March 1887; Wilkoschen, East Prussia, Prussia, German Empire
- Died: 23 October 1979 (aged 92)
- Military career
- Allegiance: Nazi Germany
- Branch: Army (Wehrmacht)
- Rank: General of the Artillery
- Commands: 28th Infantry Division; 28th Jäger Division; LXXXII. Armeekorps
- Conflicts: World War II
- Awards: Knight's Cross of the Iron Cross

Johann Sinnhuber (27 March 1887 – 23 October 1979) was a German general in the Wehrmacht during World War II who commanded the LXXXII Army Corps. He was a recipient of the Knight's Cross of the Iron Cross.

== Awards and decorations ==
- Knight's Cross of the Iron Cross on 5 July 1941 as Generalleutnant and commander of 28. Infanterie-Division

Military offices
Preceded by General der Infanterie Hans von Obstfelder	Commander of 28. Jäger Division; 21 May 1940 - 1 May 1943	Succeeded by General der Infanterie Friedrich Schulz
Preceded by General der Infanterie Ernst Dehner	Commander of the LXXXII. Armeekorps; 10 July 1943 - 1 September 1944	Succeeded by General der Infanterie Walter Hörnlein
