= Alfons Hitter =

German general (1892–1968)

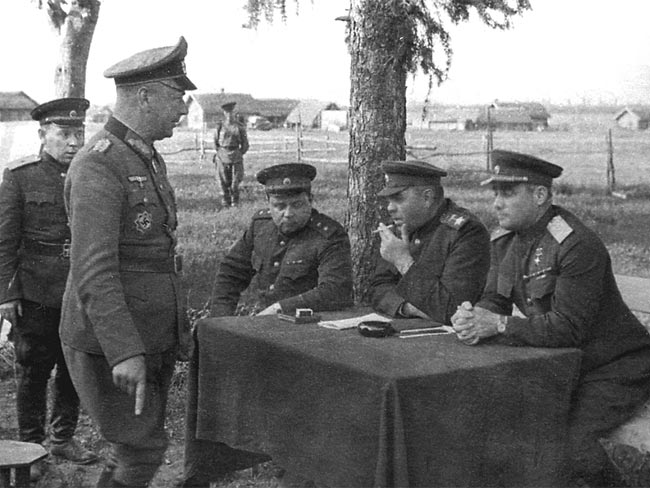
- General Hitter under interrogation
- Born: 4 June 1892; Hochstatt, Alsace–Lorraine, German Empire
- Died: 11 March 1968 (aged 75); Thomasberg, North Rhine-Westphalia, West Germany
- Military career
- Allegiance: German Empire; Weimar Republic; Nazi Germany
- Branch: German Army
- Rank: Generalleutnant
- Commands: 206th Infantry Division
- Conflicts: Vitebsk–Orsha Offensive (POW)
- Awards: Knight's Cross of the Iron Cross with Oak Leaves
- Other work: National Committee for a Free Germany

Alfons Hitter (4 June 1892 – 11 March 1968) was a German general during World War II who commanded the 206th Infantry Division. He was a recipient of the Knight's Cross of the Iron Cross with Oak Leaves of Nazi Germany.

Hitter surrendered to Soviet forces in 1944 during Operation Bagration when his division was encircled at Vitebsk. Convicted as a war criminal in the Soviet Union, he was held in prison for eleven years, joining the National Committee for a Free Germany while in captivity. He was released in 1955.

== Awards and decorations ==
- Iron Cross (1914) 2nd Class (2 September 1914) & 1st Class (5 February 1916)
- Clasp to the Iron Cross (1939) 2nd Class (13 May 1940) & 1st Class (2 July 1940)
- German Cross in Gold on 15 December 1943 as Generalleutnant and commander of 206. Infanterie-Division
- Knight's Cross of the Iron Cross with Oak Leaves
  - Knight's Cross on 14 December 1941 as Oberst and commander of Artillerie-Regiment 178
  - 488th Oak Leaves on 4 June 1944 as Generalleutnant and commander of 206. Infanterie-Division

Military offices
Preceded by Generalleutnant Hugo Höfl	Commander of 206. Infanterie-Division; 10 July 1942 – 13 July 1943	Succeeded by Generalmajor Carl André
Preceded by Generalmajor Carl André	Commander of 206. Infanterie-Division; 14 September 1943 – 28 June 1944	Succeeded by None
