= Walter Hörnlein =

German general

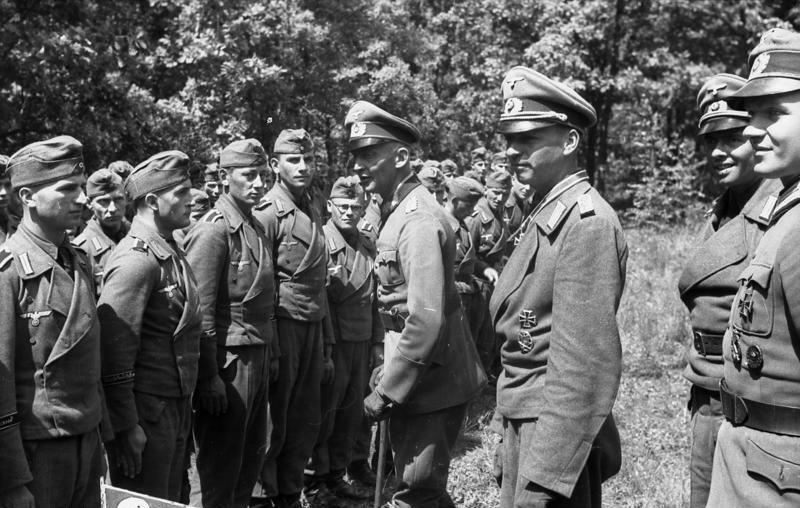
- Lieutenant General Hoernlein (center of image, 1943) on the Eastern Front in front of assault gun crews
- Born: 2 January 1893; Blüthen near Karstädt, Kreis Westprignitz, Province of Brandenburg, Kingdom of Prussia, German Empire
- Died: 14 September 1961 (aged 68); Köln-Merheim, North Rhine-Westphalia, West Germany
- Relatives: ∞ 1927 Erika Barkow, 3 children
- Military career
- Allegiance: German Empire; Weimar Republic; Nazi Germany
- Branch: German Army
- Service years: 1912–45
- Rank: General of the Infantry
- Commands: Großdeutschland Division
- Conflicts: World War I World War II
- Awards: Knight's Cross of the Iron Cross with Oak Leaves

Walter Hermann Hoernlein (2 January 1893 – 14 September 1961) was a German general in the Wehrmacht during World War II, who commanded the Großdeutschland Division. He was a recipient of the Knight's Cross of the Iron Cross with Oak Leaves.

== Life ==
From Easter 1899, Walter attended elementary school (Volksschule) in Premslin, from Easter 1903 to Easter 1908, he was a cadet at the Cadet Academy Plön and then at the Royal Prussian Main Cadet Institute in Groß-Lichterfelde near Berlin until January 1912. On 27 January 1912, he was transferred from the Cadet Institute to the 4. Westpreußisches Infanterie-Regiment Nr. 140 as an Officer Cadet.

=== 1934 to 1945 ===
- 13 August 1934 Newly sworn-in
- 15 October 1935 Commander of the I. Battalion/Infanterie-Regiment 69 in Hamburg
  - 12 November to 29 November 1935 commanded to the staff officer course of the X Army Corps in Hamburg
  - On 12 October 1937, the regiment was motorized and subsequently designated Infantry Regiment (motorized) 69. From 12 October 1937, the regiment was also subordinated to the 20th Infantry Division (motorized).
- 1 November 1939 Appointed commander of the Infanterie-Regiment 80/34. Infanterie-Division
- 29 July 1941 Führerreserve (OKH)/Army High Command Leader Reserve
  - simultaneously assigned to the Führerreserve of Army Group Center
- 1 August 1941 Appointed commander of the Infantry Regiment “Großdeutschland” (formed from parts of the Guard Regiment and the Training Infantry Regiment or Infantry Training Regiment from Döberitz)
- 27 March 1942 Commanded to the Army High Command (OKH) for the purpose of directing the formation of the Infantry Division "Großdeutschland"
- 10 April 1942 Delegated with the leadership of the Infantry Division "Großdeutschland"
- 1 May 1942 Appointed commander of the Infantry Division "Großdeutschland"
  - 25 May to 1 July 1943 granted leave (suffering from furunculosis)
  - From June 1943 (completed 30 June), the division was reorganized into the Panzer Grenadier Division "Großdeutschland" (its structure corresponded to that of a Panzer Division)
- 20 January 1944 Führerreserve (OKH)/Army High Command Leader Reserve (duty regulated by the Military District X)
  - 10 February 1944 granted three months leave
- 1 August 1944 Delegated with the leadership of the LXIV. Reservekorps
- 2 September 1944 Führerreserve (OKH)/Army High Command Leader Reserve (duty regulated by the Commander-in-Chief West)
- 7 September 1944 Delegated with the leadership of the LXXXII. Armeekorps
- 1 November 1944 Appointed commanding general of the LXXXII. Armeekorps
  - disqualified for frontline service as commanding general of a corps after only four weeks due to poor health including significant weight loss
- 30 November with effect from 1 December 1944 Führerreserve (OKH)/Army High Command Leader Reserve (duty regulated by the Military District X)
- 5 December 1944 Commanded to Military District X for the purpose of training as deputy commanding general
- 1 February 1945 Appointed deputy commanding general of the Deputy General Command II Army Corps in Stettin and commander of Military District II
  - 10 February 1945 simultaneously commandant of the Stettin defense area
- 13 March 1945 Released from the previous task as commandant of the Stettin defense area for further use (classified as top secret or geheime Kommandosache in his files)
- 21 March 1945 Again (exclusively) deputy commanding general of the Deputy General Command II Army Corps in Stettin and commander of Military District II
- 11 April 1945 Appointed commanding general of the XXVII. Armeekorps (other sources state he took over on 14, 15 or even 28 April 1945)
  - The corps was evacuated westward via Danzig and assigned to the 3rd Panzer Army as a reserve on the Eastern Front. At the end of April 1945, the corps was pushed back via Templin to Fürstenberg. The last units of the corps, retreating westward via Parchim towards the Elbe River, surrendered to American troops on 4 May 1945 in the area north of Ludwigslust. Hoernlein was repatriated in 1947.

== Promotions ==
- 27 January 1912 Fähnrich (Officer Cadet)
- 16 June 1913 Leutnant (2nd Lieutenant)
- 27 September 1919 Oberleutnant (1st Lieutenant) with Patent from 18 August 1919
  - 1 July 1922 received new Rank Seniority (RDA) from 20 June 1918 (51)
- 31 January 1927 Hauptmann (Captain) with effect from 1 February 1927 (35)
- 1 October 1934 Major (18)
- 20 April 1937 Oberstleutnant (Lieutenant Colonel) with effect and RDA from 1 April 1937 (25)
- 16 March 1940 Oberst (Colonel) with effect and RDA from 1 April 1940 (22)
- 8 April 1942 Generalmajor (Major General) with effect and RDA from 1 April 1942 (79)
- 21 January 1943 Generalleutnant (Lieutenant General) with effect and RDA from 1 January 1943 (60)
- 15 November 1944 General der Infanterie with effect and RDA from 9 November 1944 (5)

== Awards and decorations ==
- Iron Cross (1914), 2nd Class on 4 October 1914
- Wound Badge (1918) in Black
- Honour Cross of the World War 1914/1918 with Swords on 20 December 1934
- Wehrmacht Long Service Award, 4th to 1st Class
  - 2nd Class on 2 October 1936
  - 1st Class on 28 January 1937
- Repetition Clasp 1939 to the Iron Cross 1914, 2nd Class on 12 October 1939
- Iron Cross (1939), 1st Class on 29 January 1940
- Infantry Assault Badge in Silver on 9 August 1941
- Winter Battle in the East 1941–42 Medal on 22 September 1942
- Golden HJ Honour Badge with Oak Leaves
- German Cross in Gold on 14 February 1943
- Knight's Cross of the Iron Cross with Oak Leaves
  - Knight's Cross on 30 July 1941 as Oberst and commander of Infanterie-Regiment 80
  - 213th Oak Leaves on 14 March 1943 as Generalleutnant and commander of Infanterie-Division (motorized) "Großdeutschland"

== Bibliography ==
- Scherzer, Veit (2007). Die Ritterkreuzträger 1939–1945 Die Inhaber des Ritterkreuzes des Eisernen Kreuzes 1939 von Heer, Luftwaffe, Kriegsmarine, Waffen-SS, Volkssturm sowie mit Deutschland verbündeter Streitkräfte nach den Unterlagen des Bundesarchives [The Knight's Cross Bearers 1939–1945 The Holders of the Knight's Cross of the Iron Cross 1939 by Army, Air Force, Navy, Waffen-SS, Volkssturm and Allied Forces with Germany According to the Documents of the Federal Archives] (in German). Jena, Germany: Scherzers Militaer-Verlag. ISBN 978-3-938845-17-2.
- Thomas, Franz (1997). Die Eichenlaubträger 1939–1945 Band 1: A–K [The Oak Leaves Bearers 1939–1945 Volume 1: A–K] (in German). Osnabrück, Germany: Biblio-Verlag. ISBN 978-3-7648-2299-6.

Military offices
Preceded by Oberst Wilhelm von Stockhausen	Commander of Infanterie-Regiment Großdeutschland; 1 August 1941 – 1 April 1942	Succeeded by Oberst Köhler
Preceded by None	Commander of Infanterie-Division Großdeutschland; 10 April 1942 – 3 April 1943	Succeeded by Generalleutnant Hermann Balck
Preceded by Generalleutnant Hermann Balck	Commander of Panzer-Grenadier-Division Großdeutschland; 30 June 1943 – 31 January 1944	Succeeded by Generalleutnant Hasso von Manteuffel
Preceded by General der Artillerie Johann Sinnhuber	Commander of LXXXII. Armeekorps; 7 September 1944 – 30 January 1945	Succeeded by General der Infanterie Walther Hahm
Preceded by General der Artillerie Maximilian Felzmann	Commander of XXVII. Armeekorps; 14 April 1945 – 4 May 1945	Succeeded by None
