= 39th Infantry Division (Wehrmacht) =

- 39. Infanterie-Division Vehicle Insignia
- Active: 10 July 1942 – November 1943
- Country: Nazi Germany
- Branch: Army
- Type: Infantry
- Size: Division
- Garrison/HQ: Elsenborn
- Engagements: World War II: Eastern Front

Commanders
- Notable commanders: Hugo Hoefl

The 39th Infantry Division (German: 39. Infanterie-Division) was a German Army infantry division in World War II. Formed in July 1942, it existed for a little over 15 months. Reduced to battle group size by October 1943 in fighting during the Battle of the Dnieper on the Eastern Front, it was disbanded in November 1943. Its surviving troops were absorbed by other German army formations.

== History ==
The 39th Infantry Division was formed in Germany in July 1942, largely from Polish and other non-German personnel. Its foundation commander was Generalleutnant (Note: The rank of generalleutnant is equivalent to that of major general in the United States Army.) Hugo Hoefl. The division spent time serving garrison duty in the Netherlands before being transferred to the Eastern Front in March 1943.

Now under the command of Generalleutnant Ludwig Löweneck, the division was engaged in various actions against the Red Army. Involvement in the Battle of the Dnieper caused heavy losses and the division was little more than battle group size by October 1943. The division was disestablished in November, with the surviving infantry forming a divisional group that was absorbed by the 106th Infantry Division.
The headquarters staff, under Generalmajor (Note: The rank of generalmajor is equivalent to that of brigadier general in the United States Army.) Paul Mahlmann as Löweneck had been killed in May 1943 in a vehicle accident, was integrated into the 41st Fortress Division, which garrisoned the Peloponnese in Greece.

== Notes ==
Footnotes

Citations
