= 332nd Division =

332nd Division may refer to:

- 332nd Static Infantry Division, Wehrmacht, Germany
- 332nd Rifle Division, Soviet Union

== See also ==
- List of military divisions by number
