= Groddeck =

Groddeck is a surname. Notable people with the surname include:

- Georg Groddeck (1866–1934), German psychologist
- Karl-Albrecht von Groddeck (1894–1944), German Generalleutnant in the Wehrmacht during World War II
- Karl-Heinrich von Groddeck (1936–2011), German Olympic rower
