= Karl von Groddeck =

Karl von Groddeck can refer to:

- Karl-Albrecht von Groddeck (1896–1944), decorated German soldier in the Wehrmacht
- Karl-Heinrich von Groddeck (1936–2011), German rower
