= Chojnice =

Chojnice Chònice
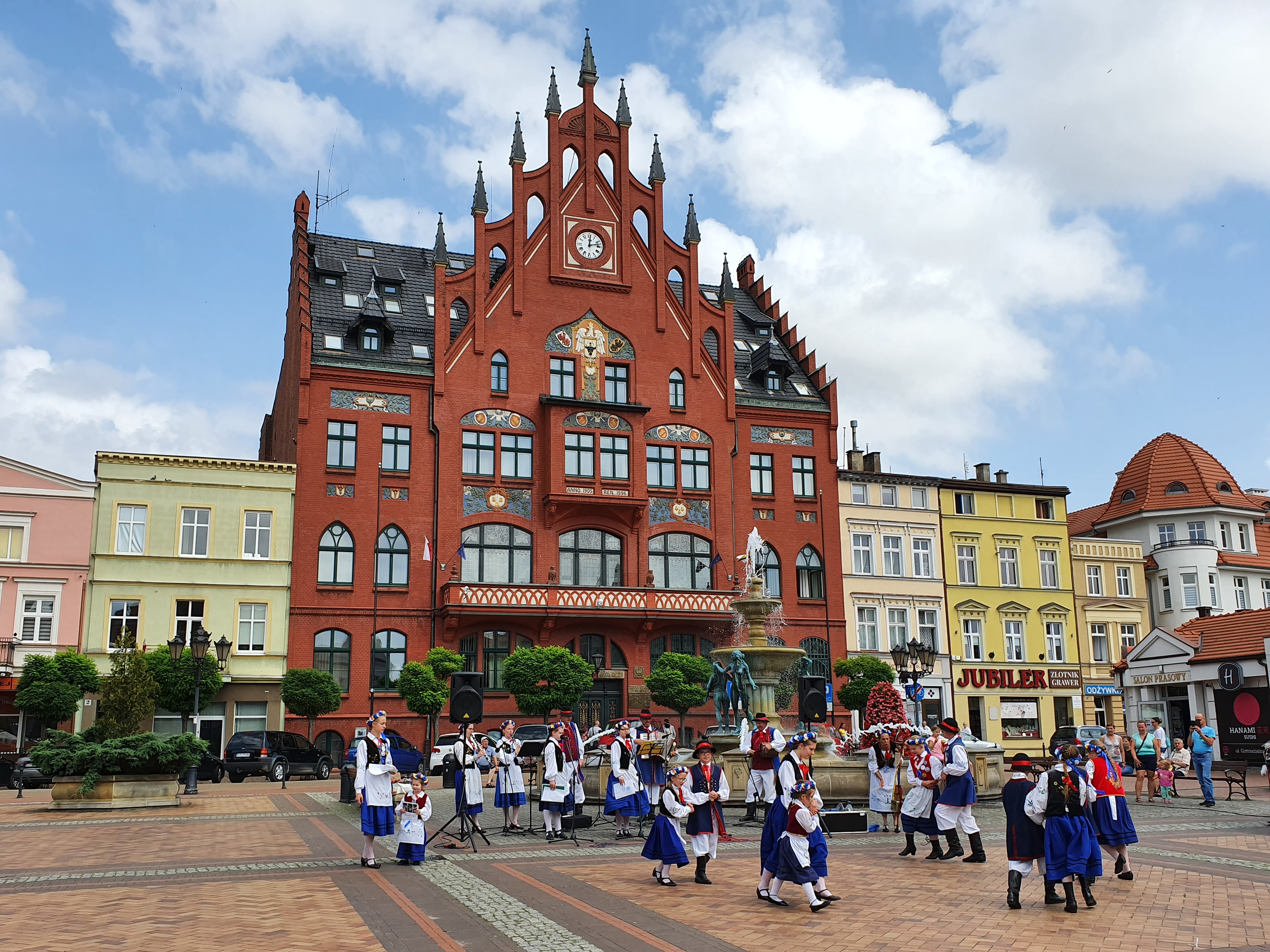
- Historical town hall located at the Rynek (Market Square)

- Flag Coat of arms

- Location within Poland
- Coordinates: 53°42′N 17°33′E
- Country: Poland
- Voivodeship: Pomeranian
- County: Chojnice
- Gmina: Chojnice (urban gmina)
- Established: 11th century
- Town rights: 1325

Government
  - Mayor: Arseniusz Finster

Area
  - Total: 21.37 km^{2} (8.25 sq mi)

Population (30 June 2023)
  - Total: 38,789
  - Density: 1,815/km^{2} (4,701/sq mi)
- Time zone: UTC+1 (CET)
  - Summer (DST): UTC+2 (CEST)
- Postal code: 89-600, 89-604, 89-620
- Area code: +48 52
- Car plates: GCH
- Website: miasto.chojnice.pl

Chojnice (Polish: [xɔjˈɲit͡sɛ]; Kashubian: Chònice or Chòjnice; German: Konitz or Conitz) is a town in northern Poland with a population of 38,789 (as of June 2023), near the Tuchola Forest. It is the capital of Chojnice County in the Pomeranian Voivodeship.

Founded in c. 1205, Chojnice is a former royal city of Poland and was an important center of cloth production. It is home to one of the oldest high schools in Poland, and played a significant role in Polish youth resistance against the Germanisation policies of Prussia following the Partitions of Poland. The town was also the site of several significant battles, and during World War II, German occupiers massacred approximately 2,000 Poles on its outskirts.

Chojnice is a railroad junction with connections to Brodnica, Kościerzyna, Piła, Szczecinek, and Tczew. It contains several Gothic and Baroque heritage sights, and is the largest town near the Tuchola Forest, a large forest complex in north-central Poland.

== History ==
=== Piast Poland (c. 1205–1309) ===
Chojnice was founded c. 1205 in the duchy of Gdańsk Pomerania (Pomeralia). At the time, the duchy was ruled by the Samborides, originally appointed governors by Bolesław III Wrymouth of Poland. Gdańsk Pomerania had been part of Poland since the 10th century. It experienced few episodes of autonomy, such as 1227–1282 under Swietopelk II.

The town's name first appears in documents in 1275. It is of Polish origin, derived from the nearby river Chojnica (now called Jarcewska Struga).

=== State of the Teutonic Order (1309–1466) ===
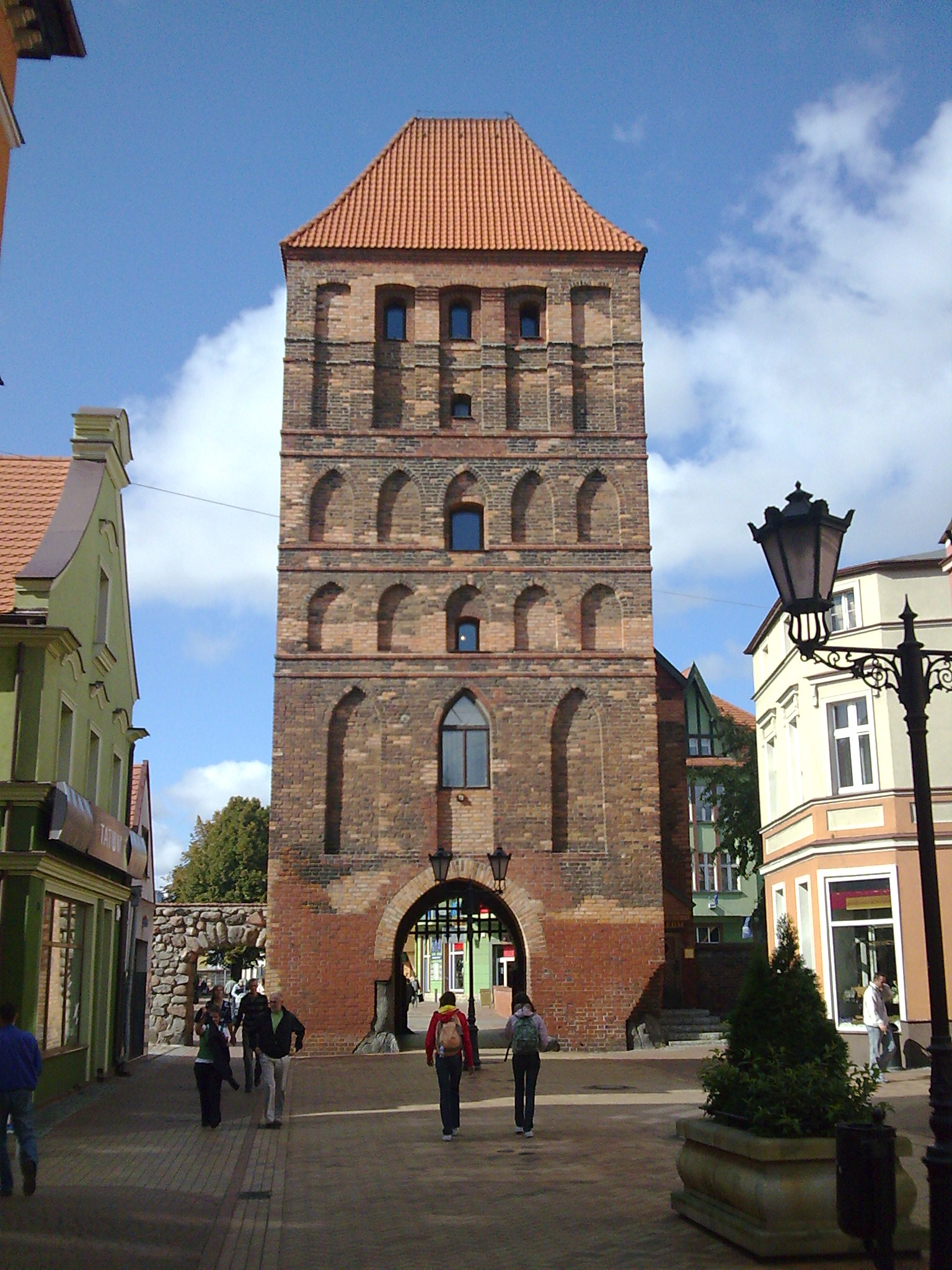
14th century Człuchów Gate, a landmark of Chojnice, houses the local historical museum

In 1309, the Teutonic Knights took over Chojnice, incorporating it into the State of the Teutonic Order. Under Grand Master Winrich von Kniprode, the town's defenses and inner structures were extensively reinforced. During this period, the Basilica of St. John's Beheading was built c. 1340–1360. In 1365, Augustinians from Stargard in Pomerania established a monastery in the town. Textile production flourished, and Chojnice became a notable textile centre between 1417 and 1436.

During the Polish–Lithuanian–Teutonic War, in 1410, the town was briefly occupied by Polish forces. In 1440, Chojnice temporarily joined the Prussian Confederation, which opposed Teutonic rule. In 1454, King Casimir IV Jagiellon re-incorporated the territory into the Kingdom of Poland, and townspeople overthrew the pro-Teutonic town council. Shortly afterwards, the council, aided by the Teutonic Knights, recaptured the town. On 18 September 1454, the Polish army led by King Casimir IV Jagiellon lost the Battle of Chojnice.

During the subsequent Thirteen Years' War, townspeople tried to resist Teutonic control. In 1466, after a three-month siege, the Teutonic troops under Captain Kaspar Nostiz von Bethes surrendered Chojnice, the last Teutonic town in Gdańsk Pomerania, to the Polish troops under Piotr Dunin.

=== Kingdom of Poland (1466–1772) ===
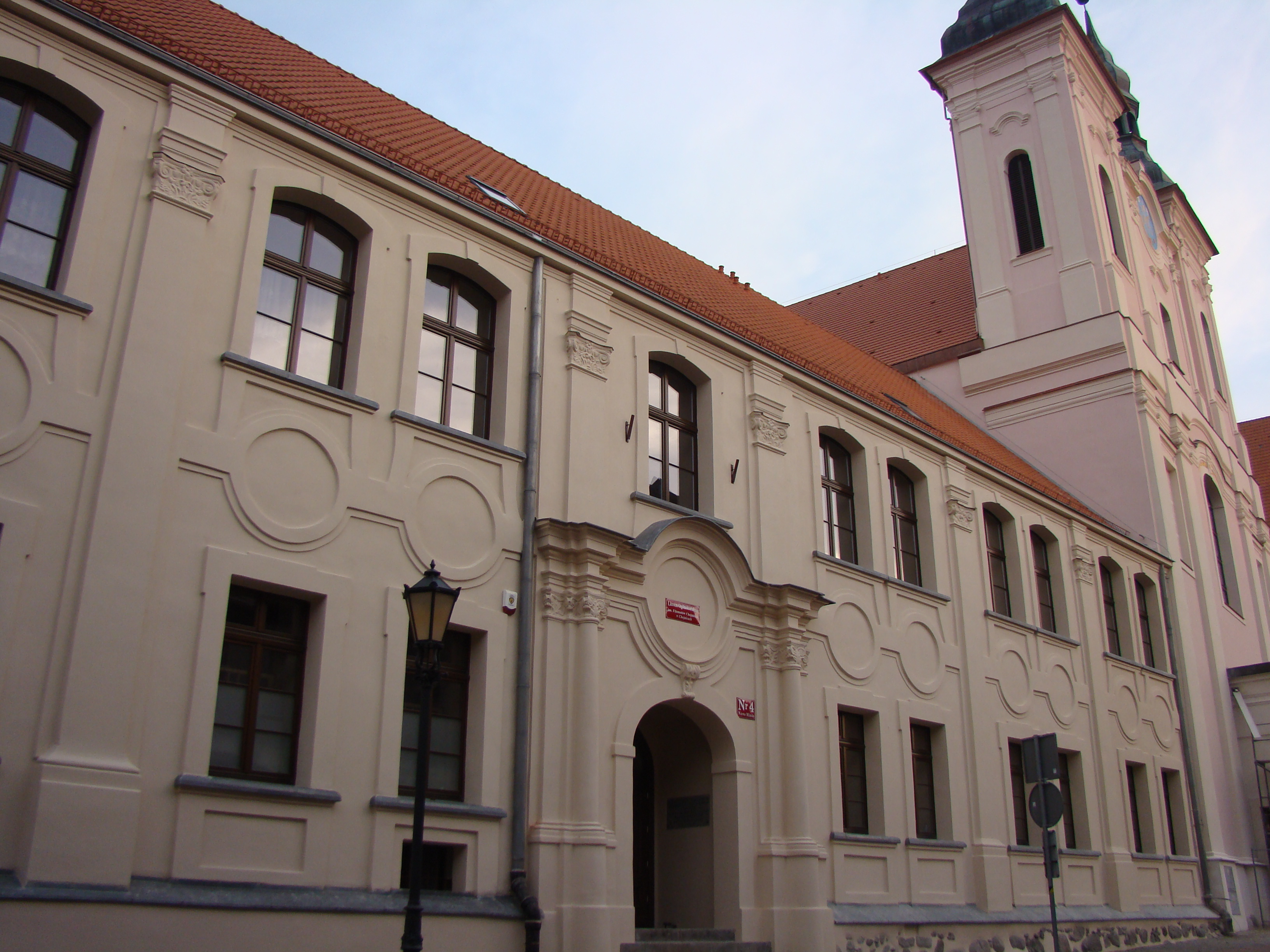
Liceum Ogólnokształcące im. Filomatów Chojnickich, one of the oldest high schools in Poland

After the Second Peace of Thorn in 1466, the Teutonic Knights renounced any claims to Chojnice, and the town became again part of Poland. It was located within the Człuchów County in the Pomeranian Voivodeship.

Chojnice continued to be an important center of cloth production in Poland. Cloth production was the main branch of the local economy, and in 1570, clothiers constituted 36% of all craftsmen in the town. To this day, one of the main streets in the town centre is called Ulica Sukienników ("Clothiers' Street").

In the 16th century, the city council officially accepted the Protestant Reformation, leading to Protestants taking over the parish church of St. John. The Roman Catholic priest Jan Siński died amid the ensuing turmoil. In 1555, King Sigismund II Augustus confirmed religious freedom for the city. In 1616, St. John's church was restored to the Catholics thanks to local parish priest Jan Doręgowski. In 1620, the first Jesuits arrived and began the Counter Reformation. In 1622, they founded a school that, today known as Liceum Ogólnokształcące im. Filomatów Chojnickich w Chojnicach ("High School of the Philomaths in Chojnice"), remains one of the oldest high schools in Poland.

In 1627, a fire destroyed parts of the town. During the Second Northern War against Sweden, the Battle of Chojnice (1656) was fought. The town suffered heavily from siege, plundering and fire, especially in 1657. Although cloth production declined due to the Swedish invasion, it soon revived. Between 1733 and 1744, the Baroque Jesuit Church of the Annunciation of the Blessed Virgin Mary was built. A large fire devastated the town again in 1742.

=== Prussia (1772–1871) and German Empire (1871–1920) ===
After the first partition of Poland in 1772, the town became part of the Kingdom of Prussia. The Prussian authorities abolished the local government, which was only restored in 1809.

==== Infrastructure and Social Developments ====
Following Chojnice's integration into Prussia, the cloth industry collapsed due to the newly introduced borders. Infrastructure developed significantly in the second half of the 19th century. A telegraph connection to Szczecin (then Stettin) began operating in 1864, and the railway reached the town in 1868, boosting industrial growth. A gas power plant was installed in 1870, followed by rail links to Tczew (Dirschau) in 1873 and to Szczecin in 1877. A new hospital was completed in 1886, and a new railway connection to Nakło (Nakel) opened in 1894. In 1900, the town gained both a water supply system and an electricity plant, and in 1902, a railway link to Kościerzyna (Berent) was added. A sewage system was completed in 1909.

During the Konitz Affair 1900–1902, Germans and Poles committed an antisemitic pogrom. In 1912, Gazeta Chojnicka, the first Polish-language newspaper, was published in the town.

==== Germanisation and Polish Resistance ====
The town was subject to anti-Polish policies and experienced the heaviest Germanisation in Gdańsk Pomerania. At the local gymnasium, Polish was taught only two hours a week during 1815–1820 and 1846–1912. In 1889, the history of Polish literature was removed from the curriculum and Polish history was omitted entirely.

Likely around 1830, a secret organization of Polish students formed at the local school. Some Polish students participated in the Polish uprisings of 1830 and 1863 in the Russian Partition of Poland. The organization probably ceased to exist in the 1860s; in 1870, a new youth philomath organization Mickiewicz was founded, named after the Polish national poet Adam Mickiewicz. In 1901, due to the threat of repressions by the German authorities, it was dissolved but reactivated a few months later.

Among local philomaths were:

- Polish-Kashubian activists and writers Aleksander Majkowski, Florian Ceynowa and Jan Karnowski
- Future minister and senator in independent Poland Leon Janta-Połczyński
- Priest, historian and co-founder of the Toruń Scientific Society Stanisław Kujot
- Co-founder and president of the first Polish scientific society in the United States Dominik Szopiński
- Priests and activists Bernard Łosiński and Konstantyn Krefft, both murdered by the Nazis in concentration camps in 1940

One of the main escape routes for insurgents of the unsuccessful Polish November Uprising from partitioned Poland to the Great Emigration led through the town. In 1911, the first Polish secret scout troop in the Prussian Partition of Poland was established in the town by Szczepan Łukowicz. He later fought as a military officer in defense of Poland during the Polish–Soviet War (1920) and the German Siege of Warsaw (1939). Łukowicz was murdered by Nazi Germany during World War II.

=== Poland (1920–1939) ===
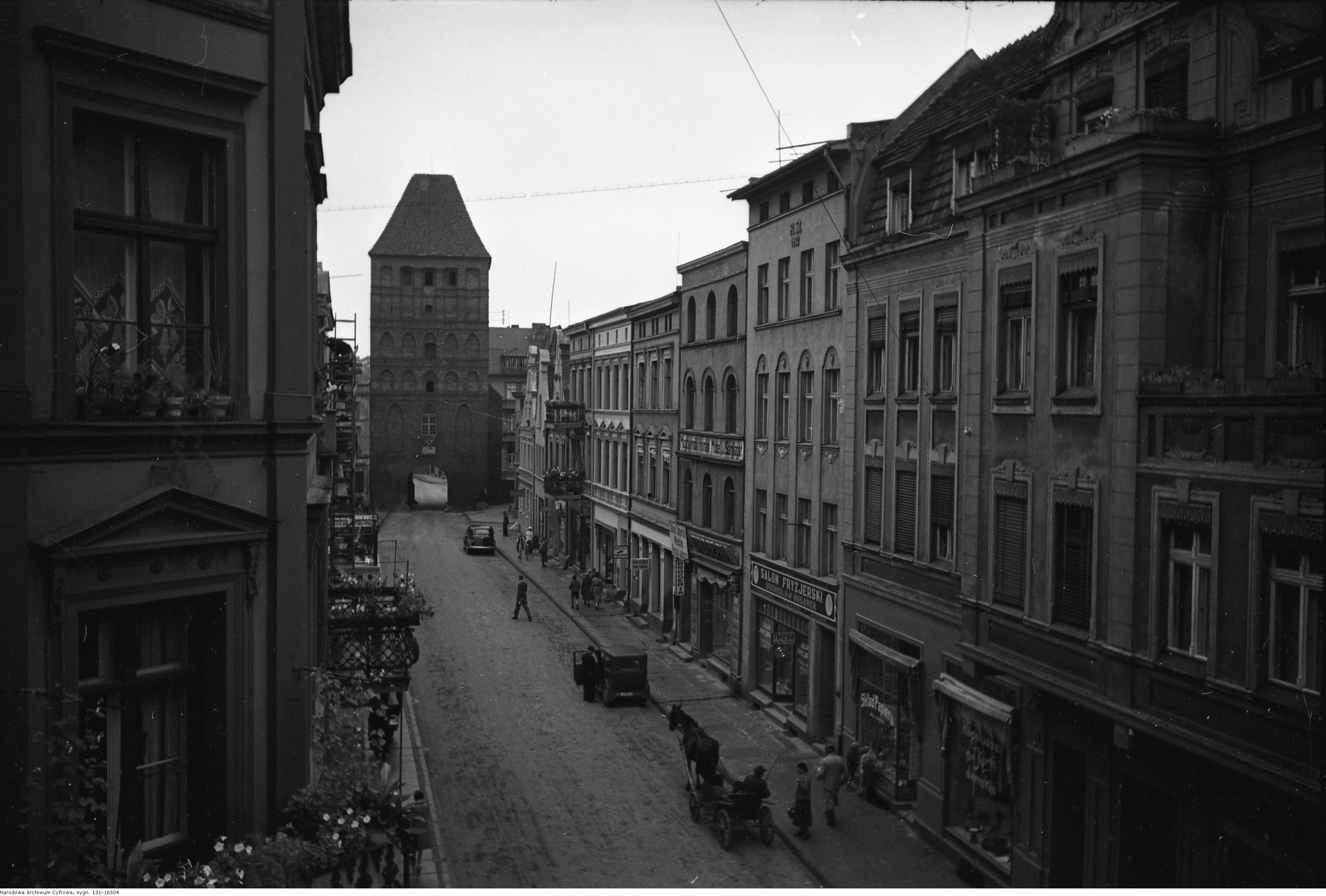
Chojnice in 1938

After the Treaty of Versailles came into effect in 1920, Chojnice – along with 62% of the former province of West Prussia – was re-integrated into the Second Polish Republic, which had regained independence in 1918. Polish troops entered the town, and local citizen Barbara Stammowa symbolically broke shackles on the balcony of the town hall. In revenge, she was murdered by the Nazis in 1939 when the town was re-occupied by Germany. In the interwar period, Chojnice hosted two official visits by Polish presidents: Stanisław Wojciechowski in 1924 and Ignacy Mościcki in 1927. In 1932, a regional museum was opened in Chojnice.

=== World War II and Nazi German occupation (1939–1945) ===
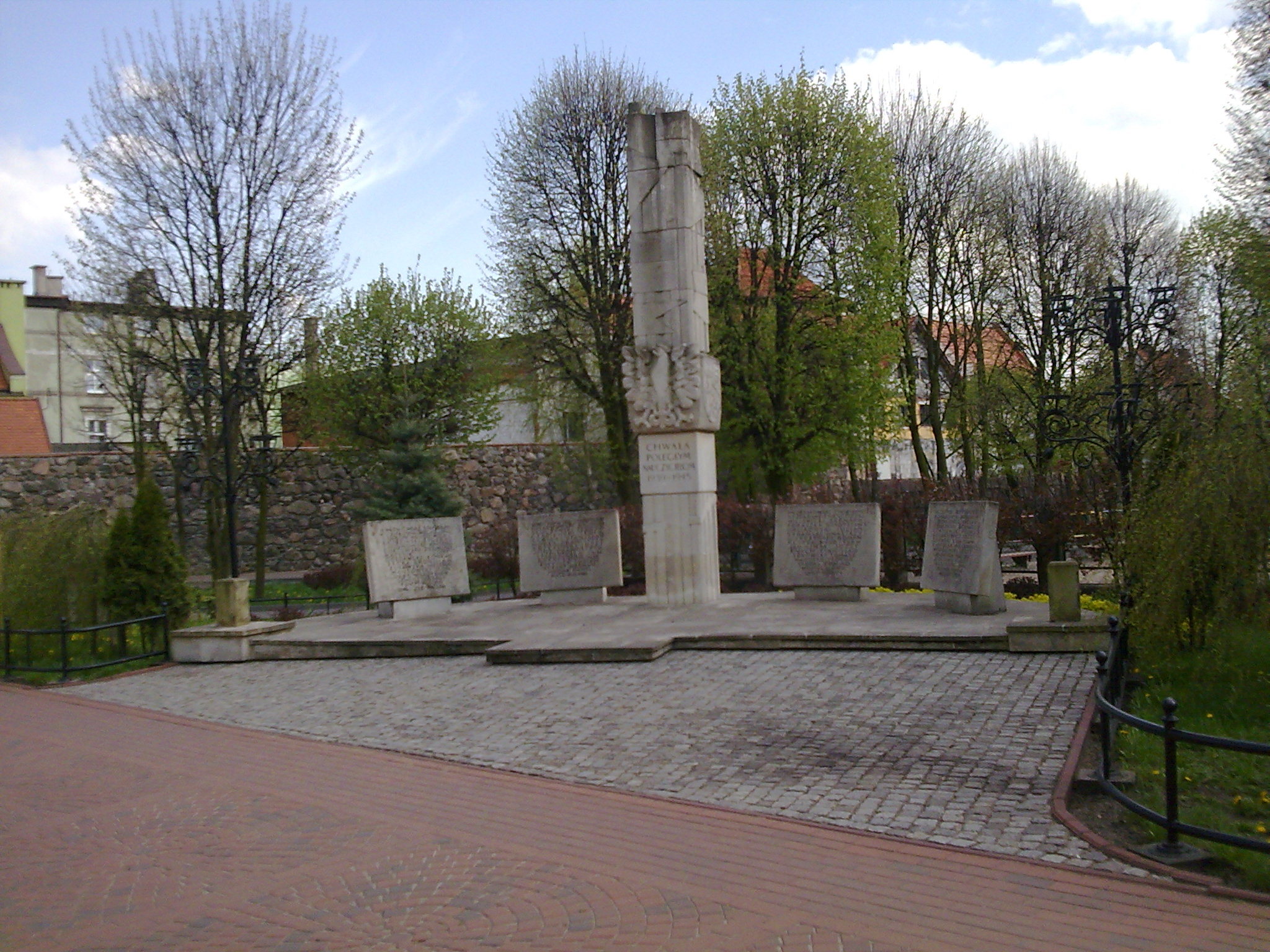
Monument commemorating Polish teachers murdered by German occupiers

On 1 September 1939 at 04:45, Wehrmacht troops occupied Chojnice during the Nazi German invasion of Poland, marking the beginning of the Battle of Chojnice.

From the start of the German occupation, German militiamen attacked their Jewish and Polish neighbors. On 26 September 1939, forty people were shot, followed by the murder of a priest and 208 psychiatric patients. Between late October 1939 and early 1940, mass executions were conducted by the SS and German police as part of the Intelligenzaktion, a campaign targeting the Polish intelligentsia. By January 1940, approximately 900 Poles and Jews from Chojnice and surrounding villages had been killed, including parliamentarians, teachers, merchants, postal workers, border guards, priests, and farmers. These massacres took place in the Igły Valley near Chojnice, later also known as the Valley of Death.

Hans Kruger, a Nazi activist, served as a judge in Chojnice during this period, overseeing executions of the local population. On 18 January 1945, the Nazis carried out a large massacre in the Igły Valley, killing around 800 Poles.

During the occupation, the Church of the Annunciation of Mary was seized by Protestants and its interior was devastated.

Polish underground resistance organisations active in the area included the Pomeranian Griffin, Kashubian Griffin, and Home Army. In 1943, local Poles successfully rescued some kidnapped Polish children from the Zamość region by ransoming them from the German occupiers at the local train station.

=== Chojnice since 1945 ===
In February 1945, the Red Army captured the town. About 800 soldiers died during the fighting, and the town center was heavily damaged. After the war, Polish authorities began rebuilding the town and oversaw the expulsion of the remaining German population under Allied agreements.

From 1945 to 1975, Chojnice was part of the Pomeranian Voivodeship, and between 1975–1998, the town belonged to the Bydgoszcz Voivodeship.

In 2002 a new, modern hospital was opened on the northwestern outskirts of the town.

== Demographics ==
The population of Chojnice has generally increased since the 18th century. However, both World War I and World War II caused significant population declines. Following the implementation of the Treaty of Versailles in 1920, many Germans left the town as the area was transferred to Poland. The impact of World War II is reflected in the 1948 census, which showed a reduction of approximately 1,900 residents compared to 1933. After World War II, the remaining German inhabitants either fled or were expelled from the city in accordance with the Potsdam Agreement.

Detailed data as of 31 December 2021:

Description	All		Women		Men	
Unit	person	percentage	person	percentage	person	percentage
Population	39423	100	20414	51.8%	19009	48.2%
Population density	1872.8		969.8		903.0	

=== Number of inhabitants by year ===
Historical population

Year	Pop.	±%
1783	1,350	—
1831	2,810	+108.1%
1837	3,334	+18.6%
1875	8,064	+141.9%
1880	9,096	+12.8%
1890	10,147	+11.6%
1900	10,697	+5.4%
1905	11,014	+3.0%

Year	Pop.	±%
1921	10,500	−4.7%
1933	14,300	+36.2%
1943	18,881	+32.0%
1948	12,400	−34.3%
1960	19,600	+58.1%
1969	24,000	+22.4%
1980	32,000	+33.3%
1990	37,700	+17.8%

Year	Pop.	±%
1995	39,872	+5.8%
2000	39,485	−1.0%
2005	39,752	+0.7%
2010	40,478	+1.8%
2015	40,043	−1.1%
2020	39,647	−1.0%

== Attractions ==
Various sights of Chojnice

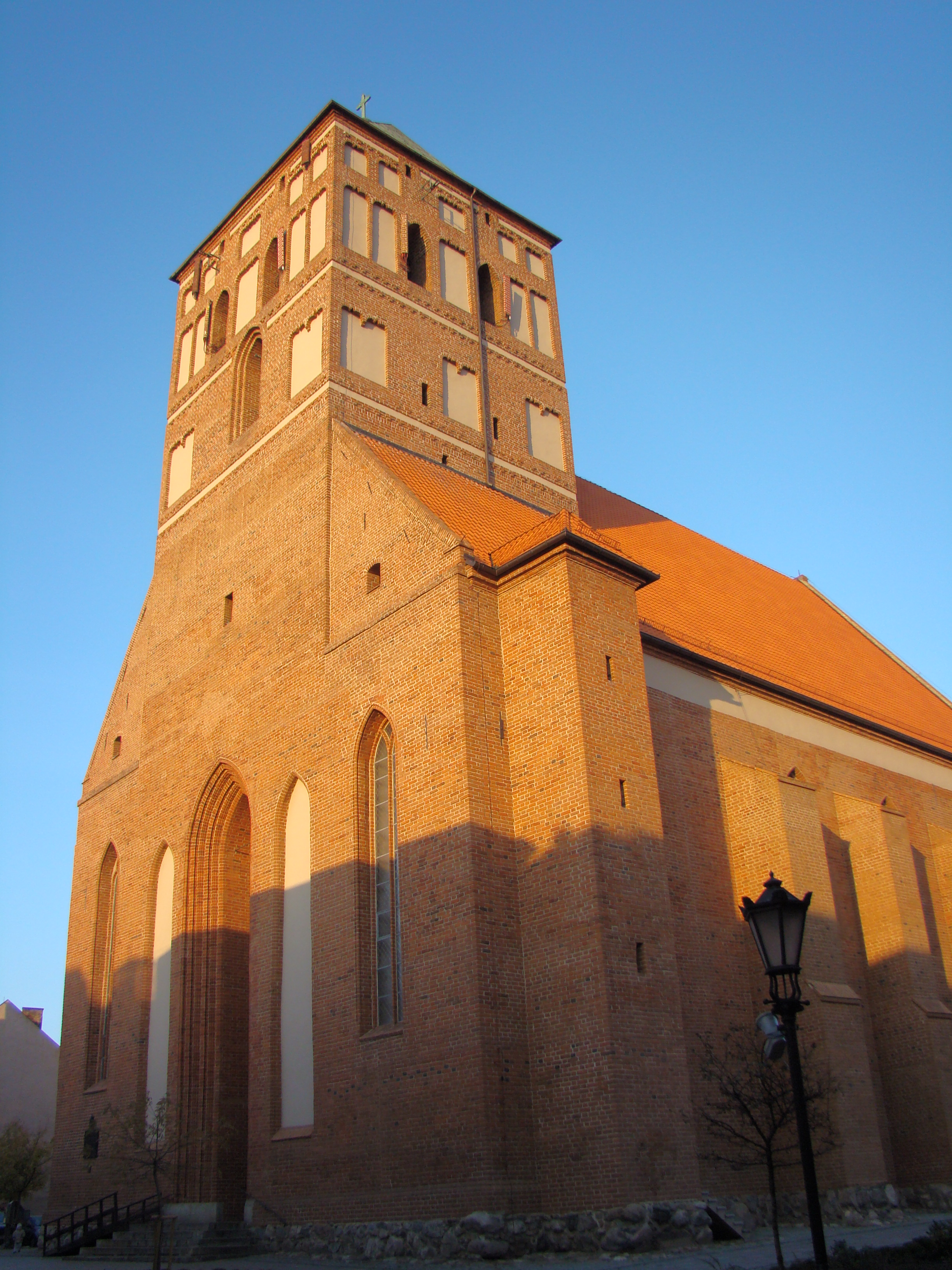
Basilica of St. John's Beheading

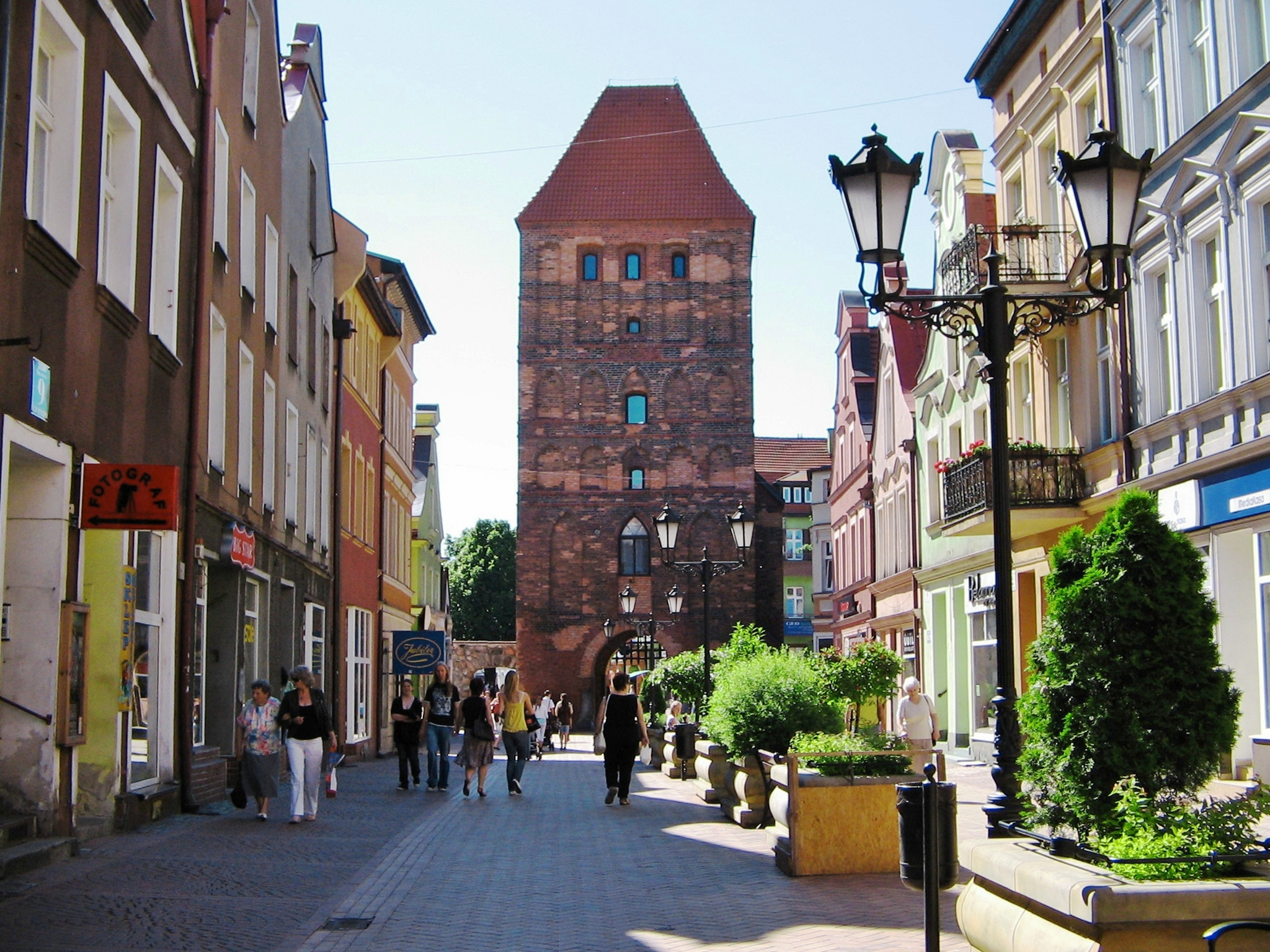
Old Town

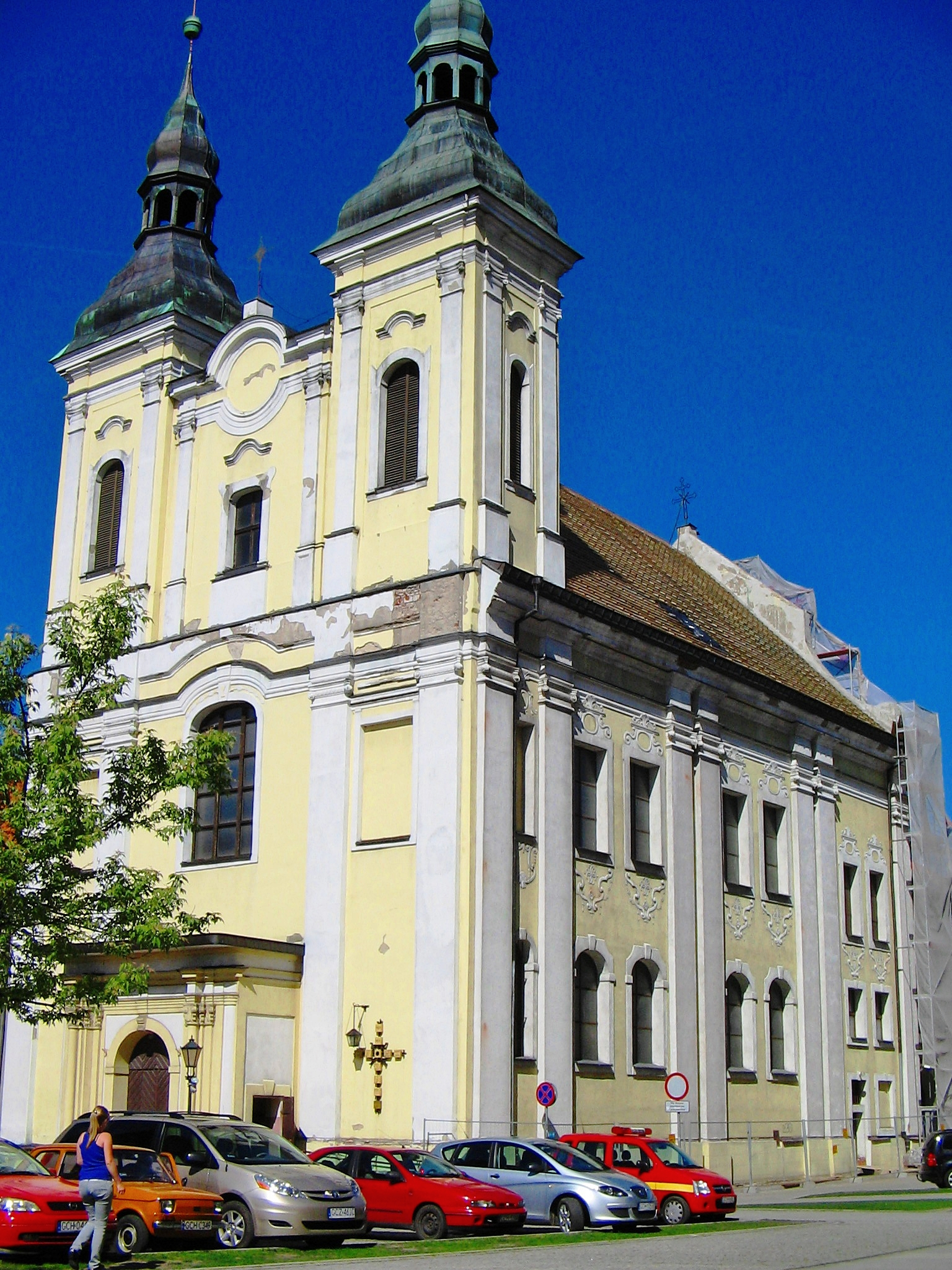
Church of the Annunciation of Mary

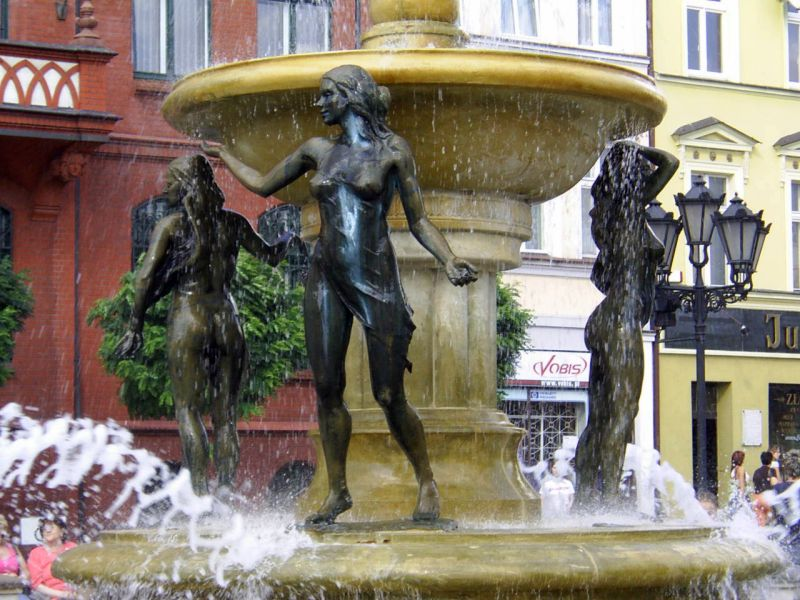
Fountain at the market square

The Museum of History and Ethnography in Chojnice opened in 1932. It was damaged during World War II and reopened in 1960. It is located in the medieval town walls and Człuchów Gate.

The town also has a number of medieval and early modern buildings, including several churches. The most prominent churches are the Gothic Basilica of St. John's Beheading and the Baroque Church of the Annunciation of the Blessed Virgin Mary.

== Geography ==
=== Climate ===
Climate in this area has mild differences between highs and lows, and there is adequate rainfall year-round. The Köppen Climate Classification subtype for this climate is "Cfb". (Marine West Coast Climate/Oceanic climate).

Climate data for Chojnice (1991–2020 normals, extremes 1951–present)
Month	Jan	Feb	Mar	Apr	May	Jun	Jul	Aug	Sep	Oct	Nov	Dec	Year
Record high °C (°F)	12.0 (53.6)	15.5 (59.9)	21.1 (70.0)	28.9 (84.0)	30.5 (86.9)	35.0 (95.0)	36.1 (97.0)	36.3 (97.3)	32.5 (90.5)	25.9 (78.6)	16.4 (61.5)	12.4 (54.3)	36.3 (97.3)
Mean daily maximum °C (°F)	0.7 (33.3)	2.1 (35.8)	6.3 (43.3)	13.3 (55.9)	18.1 (64.6)	21.1 (70.0)	23.4 (74.1)	23.2 (73.8)	18.0 (64.4)	11.8 (53.2)	5.6 (42.1)	1.9 (35.4)	12.1 (53.8)
Daily mean °C (°F)	−1.5 (29.3)	−0.6 (30.9)	2.4 (36.3)	7.9 (46.2)	12.6 (54.7)	15.8 (60.4)	18.0 (64.4)	17.7 (63.9)	13.2 (55.8)	8.1 (46.6)	3.4 (38.1)	0.0 (32.0)	8.1 (46.6)
Mean daily minimum °C (°F)	−3.8 (25.2)	−3.2 (26.2)	−1.0 (30.2)	2.8 (37.0)	7.2 (45.0)	10.6 (51.1)	12.8 (55.0)	12.7 (54.9)	9.1 (48.4)	4.9 (40.8)	1.2 (34.2)	−2.1 (28.2)	4.3 (39.7)
Record low °C (°F)	−26.9 (−16.4)	−30.0 (−22.0)	−21.2 (−6.2)	−7.6 (18.3)	−3.8 (25.2)	0.1 (32.2)	3.7 (38.7)	4.0 (39.2)	−0.8 (30.6)	−8.6 (16.5)	−16.4 (2.5)	−21.9 (−7.4)	−30.0 (−22.0)
Average precipitation mm (inches)	44.5 (1.75)	31.1 (1.22)	40.5 (1.59)	29.8 (1.17)	58.1 (2.29)	65.5 (2.58)	80.7 (3.18)	72.2 (2.84)	55.5 (2.19)	45.7 (1.80)	43.0 (1.69)	45.7 (1.80)	612.4 (24.11)
Average extreme snow depth cm (inches)	6.4 (2.5)	5.7 (2.2)	3.9 (1.5)	1.0 (0.4)	0.0 (0.0)	0.0 (0.0)	0.0 (0.0)	0.0 (0.0)	0.0 (0.0)	0.0 (0.0)	2.5 (1.0)	4.1 (1.6)	6.4 (2.5)
Average precipitation days (≥ 0.1 mm)	17.47	15.50	13.60	11.40	13.37	13.47	14.47	13.80	13.10	15.43	16.60	18.20	176.40
Average snowy days (≥ 0 cm)	15.8	14.4	7.4	0.6	0.0	0.0	0.0	0.0	0.0	0.1	2.9	9.6	50.8
Average relative humidity (%)	90.5	86.9	80.3	70.9	71.2	73.1	74.3	75.1	81.0	86.5	92.1	92.5	81.2
Mean monthly sunshine hours	41.2	68.6	133.1	207.2	260.6	261.8	260.8	245.9	171.1	114.3	45.9	31.6	1,842.2
Source 1: Institute of Meteorology and Water Management
Source 2: Meteomodel.pl (records, relative humidity 1991–2020)

== Sport ==
Chojniczanka Chojnice football club is based in the town.

== Notable people ==
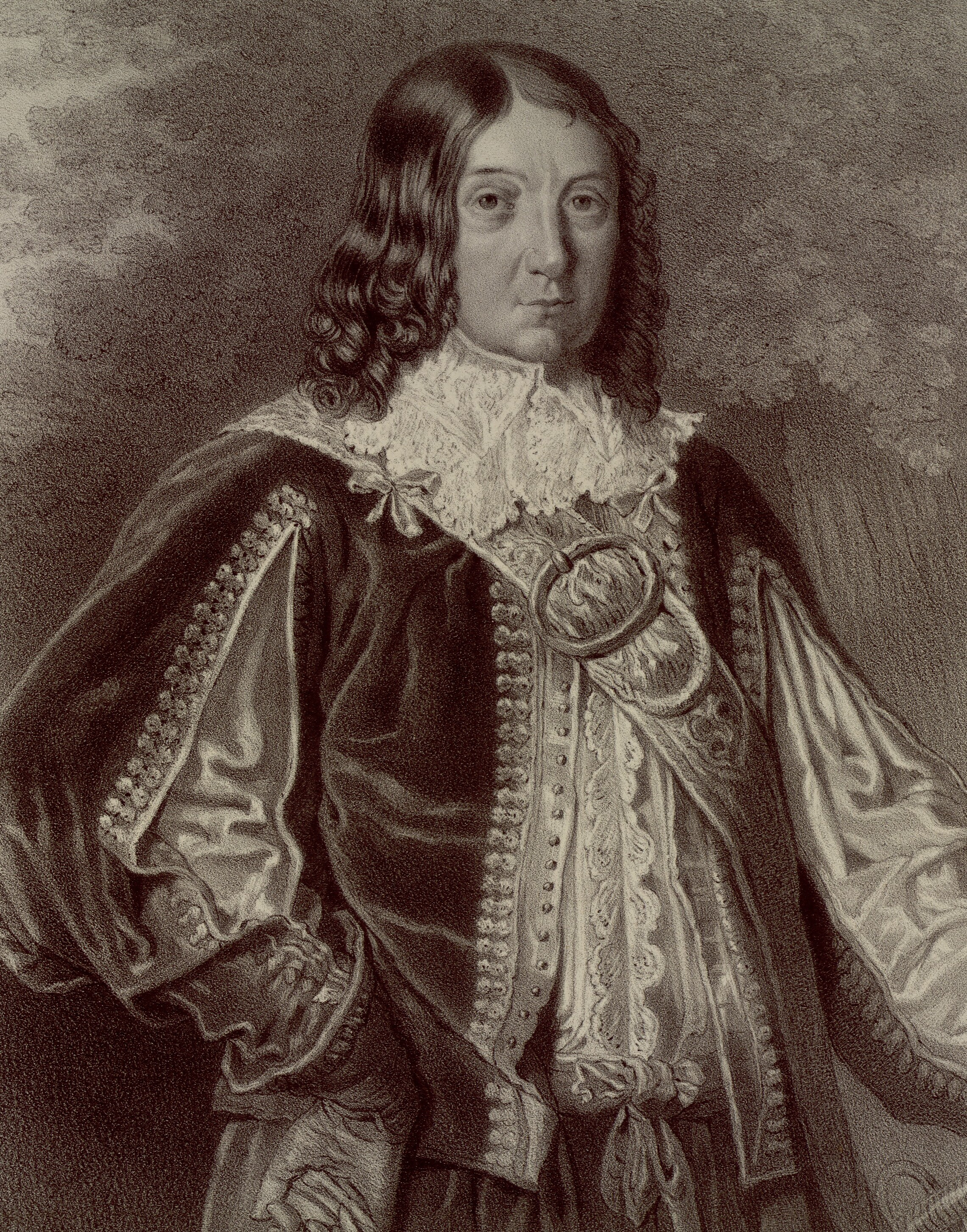
Michał Kazimierz Radziwiłł

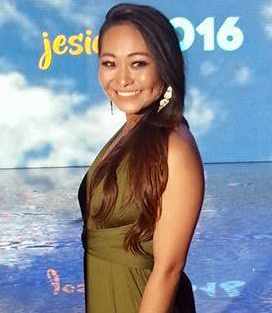
Misheel Jargalsaikhan, 2016

- Michał Kazimierz Radziwiłł (1625–1680), Polish–Lithuanian magnate, starost of Chojnice
- Johann Ernst Gotzkowsky (1710–1775), Prussian diplomat and merchant of trinkets, silk, taft, porcelain, grain, and bills of exchange
- Nathanael Matthaeus von Wolf (1724–1784), German botanist, physician, and astronomer
- Johann Daniel Titius (1729–1796), German astronomer, physicist, and biologist
- Antoni Klawiter (1836–1913), Roman Catholic and later independent Polish Catholic priest
- Emil Albert Friedberg (1837–1910), German jurist and canonist
- Rudolf Arnold Nieberding (1838–1912), German jurist and politician
- Hartwig Cassel (1850–1929), German chess journalist, editor, and promoter
- Hugo Heimann (1859–1951), German publisher and politician
- Leopold Prince (1880–1951), German-born Jewish–American lawyer, politician, judge, and conductor
- Heinrich Recke (1890–1943), German Wehrmacht general
- Willi Apel (1893–1988), German–American musicologist
- Eugeniusz Kłopotek (born 1953), Polish politician and MEP
- Dariusz Pasieka (born 1965), Polish former professional footballer with over 360 pro games
- Misheel Jargalsaikhan (born 1988), Polish child actress of Mongolian heritage
- Irmina Gliszczyńska (born 1992), Polish competitive sailor who competed at the 2016 Summer Olympics
- Arkadiusz Reca (born 1995), Polish professional football player

== Twin towns ==
Chojnice is twinned with:

Bad Bevensen, Germany; Bayeux, France	Emsdetten, Germany; Korsun-Shevchenkivskyi, Ukraine	Mazyr, Belarus; Waalwijk, Netherlands

== See also ==
- Chojnice (PKP station)
- Battle of Chojnice
- Konitz affair, an anti-Semitic riot in 1900
