= Paul Drekmann =

WW2 German Army general (1893-1960)

Dipl.-Ing. Paul Drekmann
- Born: 13 November 1893; Harburg an der Elbe near Hamburg, Province of Hanover, Kingdom of Prussia, German Empire
- Died: 9 March 1960 (aged 66); Mülheim, North Rhine-Westphalia, West Germany
- Military career
- Allegiance: German Empire (to 1918); Weimar Republic (to 1933); Nazi Germany
- Branch: Imperial German Army; Reichswehr; Heer
- Service years: 1914–1945
- Rank: Generalleutnant
- Commands: 161. Infanterie-Division; 252. Infanterie-Division
- Conflicts: World War I Spanish Civil War; World War II
- Awards: Knight's Cross of the Iron Cross

Johann Paul Friedrich Drekmann (13 November 1893 – 9 March 1960) was a German officer, a Diplom-Ingenieur (Note: In German an engineer's degree is called Diplom-Ingenieur (abbreviated Dipl.-Ing.)) and a highly decorated Generalleutnant in the Wehrmacht during World War II. He was also a recipient of the Knight's Cross of the Iron Cross. Paul Drekmann was captured by British troops in May 1945 and was held until 1947.

== Awards and decorations ==
- Iron Cross (1914)
  - 2nd Class (27 January 1916)
  - 1st Class (9 October 1917)
- Hanseatic Cross of Hamburg (19 January 1917)
- Wound Badge (1918)
  - in Black (2 August 1918)
- The Honour Cross of the World War 1914/1918 with Swords (15 January 1935)
- Wehrmacht Long Service Award, 4th to 1st Class
- Spanish Cross in Bronze (31 May 1939)
- Sudetenland Medal (12 September 1939)
- War Merit Cross with Swords
  - 2nd Class (30 January 1941)
  - 1st Class (30 January 1942)
- Imperial Order of the Yoke and Arrows, Commander (Encomienda Sencilla) on 20 March 1941
- Iron Cross (1939)
  - 2nd Class (9 September 1942)
  - 1st Class (20 October 1942)
- Wound Badge (1939)
  - in Silver (23 February 1943)
- Honour Roll Clasp of the Army (7 October 1943)
- German Cross in Gold (15 April 1944)
- Mentioned in the Wehrmachtbericht (8 February 1945)
- Knight's Cross of the Iron Cross on 28 March 1945 as Generalleutnant and commander of 252. Infanterie-Division

== Notes ==
Military offices
Preceded by Generalleutnant Karl-Albrecht von Groddeck	Commander of 161. Infanterie-Division; 28 August 1943 - 15 November 1943	Succeeded by Disbanded after heavy losses
Preceded by Formed from Korps-Abteilung A	Commander of 161. Infanterie-Division; 27 July 1944 - 5 September 1944	Succeeded by Disbanded again after heavy losses
Preceded by General der Infanterie Walter Melzer	Commander of 252. Infanterie-Division; 1 October 1944 - 25 March 1945	Succeeded by Oberst von Unold
