= 332nd Static Infantry Division =

332nd (Static) Infantry Division
- German: 332. (bodenständige) Infanterie-Division
- Division insignia
- Country: Nazi Germany
- Branch: Army
- Type: Static infantry; Infantry
- Size: Division
- Engagements: World War II

The 332nd Static Infantry Division was raised over the winter of 1940-1941 and served on coastal defense duties in Brittany and along the Channel coast until early 1943. In October 1942 the division was reorganized as the 332nd Infantry Division (with improved mobility and offensive capabilities), and in the spring of 1943 it was transferred to the Eastern Front; it was disbanded after the Battle of Kursk.

== Commanding officers ==
- Generalleutnant Heinrich Recke, 14 November 1940
- Generalleutnant Hans Kessel, 6 August 1941
- General der Infanterie Walter Melzer, 17 December 1942
- Generalleutnant Hans Schäfer, 1 January 1943
- Generalmajor Adolf Trowitz, 5 June 1943

== Structure ==
The 332nd Static Infantry Division had the following units, these were:

- 676th Infantry Regiment
- 677th Infantry Regiment
- 678th Infantry Regiment
- 332nd Artillery Regiment
- 332nd Engineer Battalion
- 332nd Field Replacement Battalion
- 332nd Cycling Detachment
- 332nd Panzerjäger Battalion
- 332nd Intelligence Department
- 332nd Supply Troops
