= Battle of Chojnice =

The Battle of Chojnice may refer to:

- Battle of Chojnice (1454)
- Battle of Chojnice (1656)
- Battle of Chojnice (1939)
