= 252nd Infantry Division (Wehrmacht) =

- 252. Infanterie-Division
- Active: August 1939 — May 1945
- Country: Nazi Germany
- Branch: Army
- Type: Infantry
- Size: Division
- Engagements: Battle of Moscow; Operation Bagration

Commanders
- Notable commanders: Walter Melzer; Paul Drekmann

The 252nd Infantry Division (German: 252. Infanterie-Division) was an infantry division of the German Heer during World War II.

== History ==
=== Mobilization, 1939 ===
The 252nd Infantry Division was formed on 26 August 1939, the day of German general mobilization, as a division of the fourth Aufstellungswelle. Its initial personnel was formed using supplementary formations from Wehrkreis VIII:

- Infantry Regiment 452 was formed using the Supplement Battalions 28 Leobschütz, 38 Freiwaldau, and 84 Cosel.
- Infantry Regiment 461 was formed using the Supplement Battalions 7 Jauer, 49 Wohlau, and 83 Jauer.
- Infantry Regiment 472 was formed using the Supplement Battalions 30 Görlitz, 51 Freystadt, and 54 Glogau.

Furthermore, the 252nd Infantry Division was equipped with Artillery Regiment 252.

The initial divisional commander of the 252nd Infantry Division was Diether von Boehm-Bezing.

=== Invasion of Poland, 1939 ===
After mobilization, the 252nd Infantry Division was assigned to the reserves of Gerd von Rundstedt's Army Group South, which oversaw the 8th, 10th, and 14th Armies during the Invasion of Poland. The 252nd Infantry Division did not see combat in Poland, and was only of note for temporary occupation duty in the country.

=== Western border, 1939 – 1940 ===
After service in Poland, the 252nd Infantry Division took position in the Saarpfalz region during the Phoney War.

On 1 February 1940, the division passed two battalions and an artillery battery to divisions of the eighth Aufstellungswelle. The division later passed about a third of the division's strength to the newly formed 134th Infantry Division of the eleventh Aufstellungswelle on 8 October 1940. The formations lost to the 134th Division were later replaced within the 252nd Division by fresh units.

=== France, 1940 ===
During the Battle of France, the 252nd Infantry Division remained with Army Group C, which oversaw the static Wehrmacht formations that were to continue to oppose the Maginot Line and to not take part in the war of movement. After other German formations broke the Allied flank in the north, the 252nd Infantry Division served with some distinction in the attacks against the Maginot defenses.

In July 1940, the 252nd Infantry Division was deployed east, towards the demarcation line with the Soviet Union.

=== Eastern Front, 1941 – 1945 ===
==== 1941 ====
The 252nd Infantry Division served under the XXXXIII Army Corps of the 4th Army during the beginning phase of Operation Barbarossa. It subsequently advanced via the Białystok area in July, was pulled into the reserves of Army Group Center until September, then put into the line once more under XXXXVI Corps at Vyazma. The 252nd Infantry Division subsequently participated in the Battle of Moscow.

On 1 November 1941, the division stood halfway between Vyazma and Mozhaysk, remaining in the second line behind the German forward positions. Parts of the 252nd Infantry Division were put into the line near the VII Army Corps by 5 November, opposite the 5th and 33rd Soviet Armies to the left and right, respectively. The forward formations of the 252nd Infantry Divisions were shifted north by 13 November, moving behind the 10th Panzer Division to a position now directly opposite the Soviet 5th Army, as the 10th Panzer Division operated against both the Soviet 5th Army and the 16th Army, the 5th Army's right neighbor. Between the two Soviet armies was Istra, some 40 kilometers northwest of Moscow.

On 11 November 1941, Infantry Regiment 452 was dissolved and replaced by Infantry Regiment 7, which had previously served in the 28th Infantry Division but had become unnecessary as the 28th Division was restructured into a Jäger Division.

The Soviet 16th Army was dislodged from its positions and forced northeast by 16 November. By now, the entire 252nd Infantry Division had been called into the line to assist its superior formation, the IX Army Corps. Istra itself was taken by the 26 November, and the 16th, 5th, and 33rd Soviet Armies (right to left from the Soviet perspective) were forced into a tight defensive ring around Moscow's urban core. The German advance died between Istra and Moscow in the first week of December 1941, and Istra's recapture by the Soviet forces on 11 December signalled the beginning of the Soviet counterattack.

==== 1942 ====
From January 1942 to January 1943, the 252nd Infantry Division held a sector near Gzhatsk. On 5 February 1942, Hans Schaefer became the new divisional commander. White Rose resistance Hans Scholl, Alexander Schmorell, Willi Graf, and Jurgen Wittenstein, served as medics during this time, specifically from June to November 1942.

==== 1943 ====
On 23 January 1943, Walter Melzer replaced Hans Schaefer as divisional commander.

On 25 February 1943, Grenadier Regiment 472 (formerly: Infantry Regiment 472) was dissolved and its two battalions given to Grenadier Regiments 7 and 461. As a result, the 252nd Infantry Division became a binary division with a total of six infantry battalions. From February to October 1943, the 252nd Infantry Division fought defensive battles in the Yelnya area.

On 6 August 1943, the 252nd Infantry Division was attacked simultaneously by nine Soviet divisions and two armored brigades. The 252nd Infantry Division, numbering around 10,000 at the time, was shelled by over 50,000 projectiles in a window of 150 minutes. Ultimately, the Soviet attack was repelled with severe Red Army casualties, including thousands of soldiers and almost 100 tanks, but German losses too were severe. Between 6 August 1943 and the end of the year, Grenadier Regiment 7 lost 37 of its 40 officers dead or wounded, and all three of the regiment's battalion commanders of August were killed in action before the end of the year.

In November 1943, the 252nd Infantry Division was transferred to the 3rd Panzer Army.

==== 1944 ====
On 4 April 1944, the 252nd Infantry Division underwent major restructuring. Its heavily battered infantry formations were consolidated into Grenadier Regiment 7, and the 461st and 472nd Regiments were subsequently disbanded. As replacement, the division was refreshed with Grenadier Regiment 70 and Grenadier Regiment 544. These two regiments were the consolidated remnants of the severely damaged 73rd Infantry Division and 389th Infantry Division, respectively.

Starting on 23 June 1944, the Soviet Red Army launched a massive summer offensive, Operation Bagration. The newly reinforced 252nd Infantry Division was employed in the German defensive operations against Bagration and received commendations from the German high command for its conduct during these operations.

On 7 July 1944, the Grenadier Regiment 472 was redeployed and staffed with one battalion from each of the other regiments. The Grenadier Regiments 70 and 544 were dissolved and the old Grenadier Regiment 461 was restored. As a result, the 252nd Infantry Division was fully returned to a ternary model, but the total number of battalions within the division did not actually change.

On 9 October 1944, Paul Drekmann became divisional commander.

On 18 October 1944, the division was strengthened by Grenadier Regiment 1072 and Combat March Battalion 1039.

In late 1944, the 252nd Infantry Division participated in the retreat across Lithuania and Poland, and was eventually trapped in Danzig and on the Hel peninsula.

==== 1945 ====
On 30 March 1945, parts of the 252nd Infantry Division were captured when the Red Army captured besieged Danzig as part of the Soviet East Pomeranian Offensive. The rest of the division under Oberst i. G. von Unold had been successfully evacuated to the occupied Danish island of Bornholm and were forced to surrender to the Red Army on 8 May 1945. However, those parts of the division that were transported to Copenhagen on 6 May 1945 by Kriegsmarine warships (including three destroyers and the auxiliary cruiser "Hansa"), including the 7th Grenadier Regiment, escaped this fate. The 252nd Artillery Regiment had remained behind on the Hel peninsula to secure the transport of the division.

== Superior formations ==
Operational chart of the 252nd Infantry Division
Year	Month	Army Corps	Army	Army Group	Area
1939	September	Army Group reserves		Army Group South	Poland
1939	December	XII	1st Army	Army Group C	Saar/Palatinate
1940	January	XII	1st Army	Army Group C	Saar/Palatinate
1940	May – June	XXIV	1st Army	Army Group C	Saar/Palatinate
1940	July – August	XXXXIV	18th Army	None	Poland
1940	September – December	XXXXIV	4th Army	Army Group B	Poland
1941	January – April	XXXXIV	4th Army	Army Group B	Poland
1941	May	XXXV	4th Army	Army Group B	Poland
1941	June	XXXXIII	4th Army	Army Group Center	Poland
1941	July	XIII	4th Army	Army Group Center	Białystok
1941	August – September	Army Group reserves		Army Group Center	Central Russia
1941	October	XXXXVI	4th Panzer Group	Army Group Center	Vyazma
1941	November	Army reserves	4th Panzer Group	Army Group Center	Moscow
1941	December	IX	4th Panzer Group	Army Group Center	Moscow
1942	January – April	IX	4th Panzer Army	Army Group Center	Gzhatsk
1942	May – December	IX	3rd Panzer Army	Army Group Center	Gzhatsk
1943	January	IX	3rd Panzer Army	Army Group Center	Gzhatsk
1943	February – October	IX	4th Army	Army Group Center	Yelnya
1943	November	Army reserves	3rd Panzer Army	Army Group Center	Orsha
1943	December	IX	3rd Panzer Army	Army Group Center	Nevel
1944	January – June	IX	3rd Panzer Army	Army Group Center	Nevel
1944	July – September	IX	3rd Panzer Army	Army Group Center	Lithuania
1944	October – December	XX	2nd Army	Army Group Center	Narew
1945	January	XXVII	2nd Army	Army Group Center	Narew
1945	February – March	XXIII	2nd Army	Army Group Vistula	West Prussia
1945	April	XXIII	Army East Prussia	None	West Prussia

== Noteworthy individuals ==
=== Divisional commanders ===
- Diether von Boehm-Bezing: divisional commander of the 252nd Infantry Division (26 August 1939 – 5 February 1942).
- Hans Schaefer: divisional commander of the 252nd Infantry Division (5 February 1942 – 23 January 1943).
- Walter Melzer: divisional commander of the 252nd Infantry Division (23 January 1943 – 9 October 1944).
- Paul Drekmann: divisional commander of the 252nd Infantry Division (9 October 1944 – 24 March 1945).
- Georg von Unold: divisional commander of the 252nd Infantry Division (post assumed 24 March 1945).

=== Others ===
- Armin Scheiderbauer: "Adventures in My Youth: A German Soldier on the Eastern Front 1941–45". A biography based on his serving an infantry officer with the 252nd Infantry Division from 1942 - 1945.
- Alexander Schmorell, Hans Scholl, Willi Graf, Jürgen Wittgenstein and Hubert Furtwängler: White Rose members.
