= Konitz affair =

Accusation of Jewish ritual murder in 1900

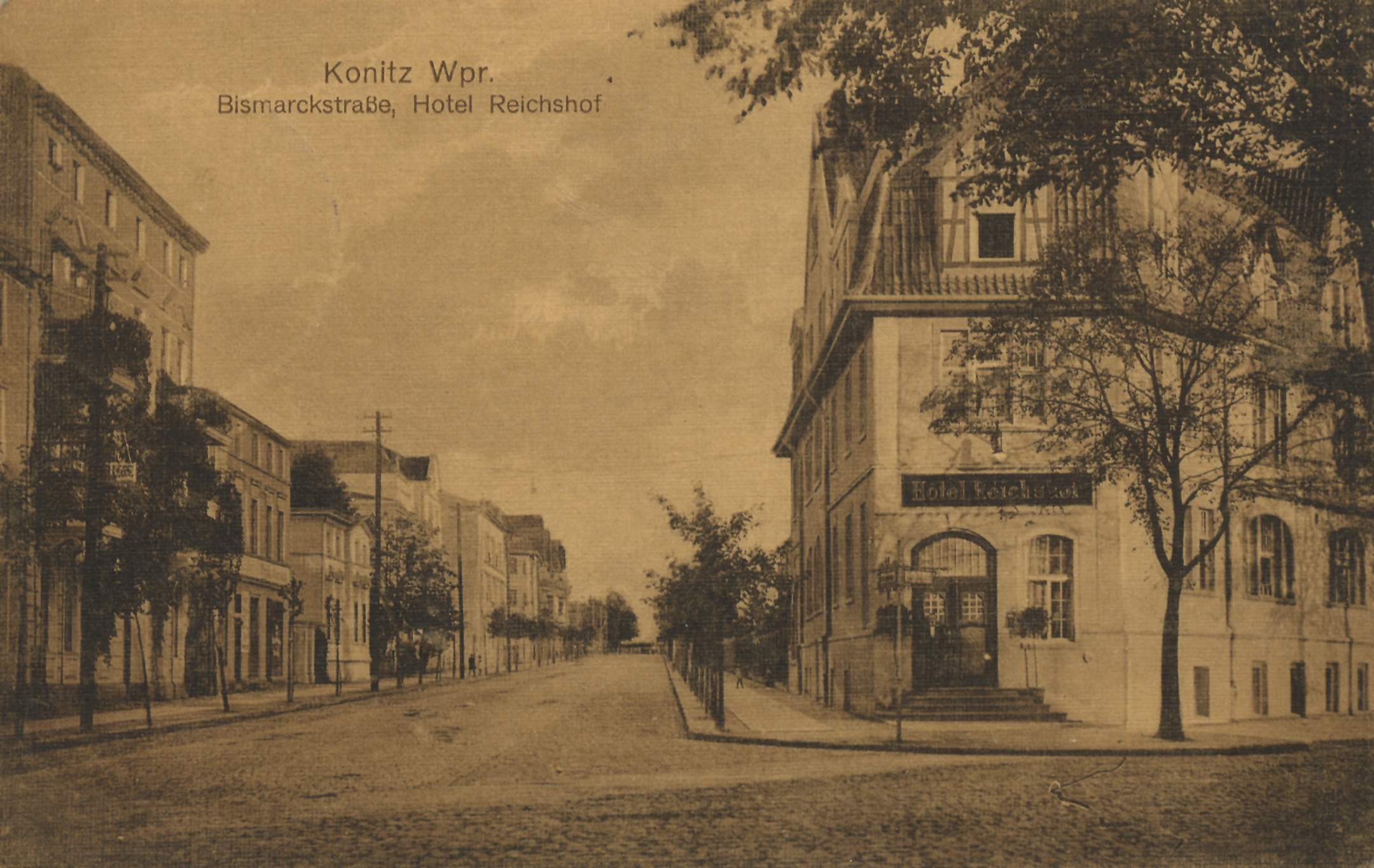
- Konitz, c. 1900
- Date: March 11, 1900
- Location: Konitz, West Prussia, German Empire

The Konitz affair was an accusation of Jewish ritual murder in the unsolved murder and dismemberment of student Ernst Winter in Konitz, then part of the Prussian Province of West Prussia in the German Empire (now part of northern Poland), in 1900. Although jealousy was later determined to be the probable motive, antisemitic leaders were quick to turn suspicion against the Jewish inhabitants, and encouraged and bribed locals to testify against the Jews.

Violence against Jews increased, leading to riots in Konitz and several nearby towns, and marked the worst period of antisemitic violence in Wilhelmine Germany. The number of Jews residing in Konitz fell by 28% between 1900 and 1903. A number of Jews were prosecuted regarding the riots and other incidents, and received harsher sentences than their attackers. Accused of shielding the Jews, the government and detectives felt compelled to investigate the most improbable statements implicating Jews. Despite exonerating physical evidence, two Jews were brought to trial for the murder and acquitted.

On June 4, 1902, an appeal to the superior court held that all accusations against the Jews were baseless. Wilhelm Bruhn and Bötticher, the publisher and editor of antisemitic newspaper Staatsbürgerzeitung, were convicted of libel against the government. Pastor Krösell, who lectured in Konitz on Jewish immorality, was forced to withdraw from the ministry. Despite this, antisemitic sentiment remained popular, and Bruhn, Bötticher and Krösell were elected to the Reichstag in 1903.

== Murder and investigation ==
Ernst Winter was a 19-year-old student of the gymnasium of Konitz, West Prussia (now part of northern Poland). He was the son of an architect in Prechlau and was known for his licentiousness. On March 11, 1900, he left his boarding-house after dinner and did not return. It was immediately thought probable that Winter had fallen through lake ice while skating. The lake was searched, and on March 15 parts of his body were discovered. His right arm was found thrown over the fence of a Protestant cemetery. On April 15, his head was recovered from a pool. The body had been dismembered by someone possessing a knowledge of anatomy; suspicion thus turned against the local butchers, especially against the Christian butcher Hoffmann. Hoffman's daughter had been frequently seen in Winter's company, and a member of his household had been heard to express threats against Winter on account of his attention to the young woman.

Forensic evidence determined that Winter's head had been frozen in the pool for some time. The state of Winter's stomach contents proved that he could not have died later than seven o'clock in the evening.

Antisemites tried from the outset to turn suspicion against the Jewish inhabitants. This included antisemitic publications in Berlin such as Staatsbürgerzeitung, whose editor Wilhelm Bruhn permanently settled in the Konitz area to report about the events and to cajole and bribe locals to testify against the Jews. Police found no evidence to implicate the Jews, and on May 9, 1900, the publication declared: "No one can help forming the impression that the organs of the government received orders to pursue the investigation in a manner calculated to spare the Jews." Detectives and judges eagerly took up the most improbable statements implicating Jews, while Christian witnesses withheld important testimony. The police appealed for the owner of a handkerchief in which Winter's head was wrapped to come forward; only by accident was the owner's identity revealed to be the wife of school superintendent Rohde. Also, two young men who were last seen in Winter's company never revealed their identities. Some of the garments of the murdered youth were kept in a house in the city until January 1901, without being discovered by the police, and were subsequently found on different days in a public park.

Hoffmann was arrested and subsequently discharged. The city council, of which he was a member, gave him a cordial reception when he first appeared after his release. Among the grounds for dismissal, the court held that the deed must have been perpetrated by several people and according to a premeditated plan, indirectly supporting the accusation of ritual murder. Dr. Müller, the county physician (German: Kreisphysikus), rendered the opinion that Winter had bled to death, which, as subsequent investigations proved, was untenable. This opinion was published in the Staatsbürgerzeitung before the investigation of the court had been closed. For this breach of confidence, Müller's son, who had communicated the document to the press, was censured by a court of honor (German: Ehrengericht).

== Antisemitic agitation and excesses ==
The violence against Jews during the Konitz affair was sporadic at first. However, it increased in intensity until it became the worst case of antisemitic violence in the history of Wilhelmine Germany. On June 8, 1900, a shed near the synagogue of Konitz was set on fire; and two days later excesses were committed against the synagogue and against Jewish homes to such an extent that the military had to be called. Similar riots, though not of such a severe character, occurred at Czersk (April 22), Stolp and Bütow (May 21–22), Tuchel (June 10), and Komarczyn (June 17).

In all of these cases the sentences imposed upon the rioters or assailants were very light, while Jews, whenever they came before the court, met with hostile sentiment and received heavy sentences for the slightest offenses. A county official to whom a Jew complained of the insults to which he had been subjected on the street, replied: "You can easily obtain relief, if you give up the murderer." A synagogue sexton who defended himself with a stake against a crowd which assailed him was sentenced to spend a year in jail; and a similar sentence was imposed on a Jewish apprentice because he had beaten a boy who had jeered at him. A highly respected citizen, Jacob Jacoby of Tuchel, was sentenced to confinement for one year in the penitentiary for perjury (October 10), because he had sworn that he had called some boys who had shouted "Hep-Hep!" after him "lümmel" (toughs) only after they had insulted him, while the boys swore that he had first called them offensive names. This sentence was so repugnant to public opinion that the emperor commuted it to six months in jail, and revoked that part by which the convict was deprived of civil rights (March 1901).

A common superstition during the Konitz affair was that Jews caused harm to children during their Passover rituals. An organization revealed that between 1891 and 1900, there were 120 reported incidents involving this belief, accusing Jews of ritual murder. While these were largely concentrated in Eastern Europe, it spread into the German Empire, contributing to the increase of antisemitic sentiments which often led to violence.

Authorities were very lenient regarding two dangerous agitators: Silesian count Pückler and Pomeranian pastor Krösell. The former, whom a court afterward adjudged insane, delivered in various cities violent antisemitic diatribes declaring that Jews must be clubbed out of the country and that the Christians must wade in Jewish blood up to their ankles. Krösell, who later had to withdraw from the ministry in order to escape a sentence of expulsion for immorality, delivered in the neighborhood of Konitz lectures on ritual murder and on the immorality of rabbinical literature; neither the ecclesiastical nor the state authorities would interfere, and the people elected Krösell to the Reichstag in 1903. In the Reichstag, where this case was made the subject of an interpellation (February 8–9, 1901), Prussian minister of justice Schönstedt limited himself to a defense of the authorities against the charge of shielding the Jews. He carefully refrained from uttering one word in condemnation of the ritual-murder charge.

Antisemitic politician Liebermann von Sonnenberg said in a public address: "The Christians have not yet become accustomed to bear without a murmur the killing of Christian youths in an unnatural fashion by Jews within the city walls." The antisemitic papers, including Germania and Kreuzzeitung (the organs of the Clerical party and Conservative party, respectively), constantly stirred religious fanaticism and fostered the prejudice that the government had been bought by the Jews. A society for the investigation of the murder was formed, and spread false statements that the coroner's commission had not searched the ritual bath near the synagogue, and had left undisturbed a room in the house of butcher Adolf Lewy in which his wife was supposed to be sick. In fact, all the rooms in Lewy's house and every nook and corner in the synagogue been searched, and the commission had even taken a sample of the blood of chickens from the yard which was used for killing fowl (see Shehilah).

The members of a highly respectable family named Rosenthal in Cammin were kept in prison for six months, because a servant-girl of bad character testified that she had heard Rosenthal say that he would hang himself on a hook in the ceiling of his room, as he was unable to bear the remorse he felt for having participated in the murder of Winter. Investigation proved that this was intentionally false testimony. In the room, where, according to the girl's statement, Rosenthal had pointed to the hook, there never had been such a hook; the case against the girl was dismissed in 1902 on the plea of insanity.

== Trial of Wolf Israelski ==
Wolf Israelski, a Jew, was arrested as he had been seen walking on April 13 in the direction of the place where Winter's head had been found, with a sack on his back in which there was a round object. Although he denied the fact, and the state of the head proved conclusively that it must have been in the ice for more than two days, Israelski was kept in prison for nearly five months, until his innocence was proven at trial on September 8.

== Trial of Moritz Lewy ==
Adolf Lewy was one of the butchers who came under suspicion, whose house was near the lake where Winter's torso was found. Both Adolf and his son Moritz had an irrefutable alibi for the hours of the murder, but the anti-Semites testified that Moritz had frequently been seen in Winter's company. Moritz denied this, though he could not deny the possibility of briefly talking to Winter or walking with him without knowing his name. Moritz stated this again at the perjury trial of normal-school student Speisiger, who had made various statements implicating Jews, while other witnesses testified that they had seen them together. Moritz was arrested for the murder on October 6, with charges resting on the testimony of a disreputable person named Masloff.

Masloff alleged that he had passed Lewy's cellar on the evening of the murder and had been attracted by groaning and an unusual light. Lying on the ground, he watched people who had human remains on a butcher's block, and saw three of them leave with a package, travelling in the direction of the lake. The testimony contained many contradictions which Masloff attempted to explain by confessing that he had gone to the place to attempt a burglary. Persons who had passed Lewy's house at the time Masloff claimed had not noticed anyone lying on the ground, it was improbable that a man should remain on the ground for an hour and a half on a cold March night, the murder could not have been committed at such a late hour, and an investigation of the cellar showed neither sign of blood nor extensive cleaning.

Masloff's mother-in-law, Ross, who had worked for the Lewy family, seems to have incited the conspiracy in order to obtain a reward. She claimed to have seen Winter's cigar case and photograph in the Lewy family's possession, but it was proven that no photograph of Winter existed. On October 25, Masloff was sentenced to one year and Ross to eighteen months for perjury; though the jury signed a petition for their pardon, the emperor refused to grant it.

Although the testimony on which the accusation rested was disproven, the government brought the matter to trial due to accusations of shielding the Jews. The case was dismissed on September 25, 1901, but Moritz was later sentenced to four years for perjury on the grounds of his denial of acquaintance with Winter. The emperor pardoned Moritz on October 12, 1903. Adolf and the family had already moved to Berlin, as their business had been ruined, as was the case with many others. The number of Jews residing in Konitz fell from 481 in 1900 to 350 in 1903.

== Further investigations and effects ==
An investigation made in Danzig by the board of health (Königliches Medizinalkollegium) for West Prussia proved that Winter had been choked to death, and that, contrary to the statement of the county physician, his death was not the result of the cutting of his throat. This opinion, rendered September 7, 1901, was confirmed by the highest medical authority, the Wissenschaftliche Deputation für Medizinalwesen (state board of health), January 15, 1902. It was further shown that jealousy was, in all likelihood, the motive for Winter's death.

It was evidently for political reasons that the appeal of Winter's father to the superior court (German: Oberlandesgericht) of Marienwerder was considered sufficiently well founded to be made the basis of a trial, which was held June 4, 1902, and which proved the baselessness of all the accusations against the Jews.

The government showed itself stronger in prosecuting cases of libeling the authorities. Bruhn, the publisher, and Bötticher, the editor, of the Staatsbürgerzeitung, which paper had from the beginning accused the police and the courts of shielding the perpetrators of the crime because they were Jews, were sentenced for libel, the former to six months and the latter to one year in jail (October 11, 1902). Both of them, however, were elected to the Reichstag in 1903. Previously G. A. Dewald, a Berlin publisher, had been sentenced to six months in jail because on the first anniversary of Winter's assassination he had published souvenir postal cards representing Winter suspended by his feet in Lewy's cellar with Jews ready to cut his throat.

On September 28, 1903, two drunkards in Steegers beat to death a Polish typesetter named Abraham Levy, after he rebuked their taunts about the murder. One of the perpetrators was sentenced to a year in jail, while the case against the other was dismissed.

Mysterious as the Konitz case is, it has been clearly established that the motive of the crime was jealousy.

== See also ==
- List of solved missing person cases (pre-1950)
- List of unsolved murders (1900–1979)
- Antisemitism in Germany
