= 161st Infantry Division (Wehrmacht) =

- 161. Infanterie-Division
- Unit Insignia
- Active: 1 December 1939 – October 1944
- Country: Nazi Germany
- Branch: Army
- Type: Infantry
- Size: Division, 15,000 Personnel
- Garrison/HQ: Troop training Area Arys
- Engagements: World War II: Battle of France; Operation Barbarossa; Battle of Białystok–Minsk; Smolensk; Kursk 1943; Romania 1944

The 161 Infantry Division was a major unit of the German Wehrmacht. It fought in the Battle of France, and then later on in the Eastern Front.

== Organisation ==
=== Formation ===
The division was formed in December 1939 as part of the 7th wave of German mobilisation, and used the replacement battalions in Wehrkreis I (East Prussia) to form its combat units. The 161st was organised as a standard triangular infantry division with 3 Infantry Regiments, with 9 battalions and 1 Artillery Regiment plus supporting units.

It was a sign of the Wehrmacht's rapid expansion that the division was short of artillery with only 6 medium batteries instead of 9 and no heavy artillery. It was also short of motor transport, and had a small mixed battalion of an anti-tank company and a bicycle company instead of an anti-tank battalion and a reconnaissance battalion.

=== Summer 1941 ===
By the start of the Russian campaign, the equipment shortages had been resolved and the division had a full complement of 36 105 mm howitzers and 12 heavy 150 mm howitzers. It also now had a three-company anti-tank battalion, greater capacity in its supply units and a field replacement battalion. However, it was still missing a reconnaissance battalion; instead it only had a bicycle squadron.

- Infantry-Regiment 336
- Infantry-Regiment 364
- Infantry-Regiment 371
- Artillery-Regiment 241
- Anti-tank Battalion 241
- Bicycle-Squadron 241
- Pionier Battalion 241
- Feld-replacement Battalion 241
- Communications Battalion 241
- Divisional Services 241

By 1 December the division had reorganised its infantry regiments into 2 battalions each, instead of three, due to manpower shortages

In November 1942 the division was posted to France to recover and refit.

=== November 1943 ===
Parts of the division were incorporated into the Korps Abteilung A, with each regiment contributing a battalion sized unit as a 'regiment gruppe'. The expedient of forming these Korps Abteilung was to rebalance the ratio of staff and service troops to combat troops. The excess staff and support specialists could then be used to build new formations in Germany.

=== Reformation ===
Many of the Korps Abteilung were later reformed into infantry divisions, and this is true of Korps Abteilung A, which was converted into a second incarnation of the 161st infantry in July 1944. The new division did not last long and was destroyed in the following month. Its surviving personnel were used to refresh the 76th Infantry Division and in the reformation of the 15th Infantry Division.

== Combat history ==
In 1940 the 161st took part in a short-lived attack on the Maginot Line on 21 June. After a single day's assault that achieved little, the attack was called off by Colonel General von Leeb as unnecessary.

=== Attack on the Soviet Union ===
On 22 June 1941 the 161st attacked the Soviet Union as part of Army Group Centre's 9th Army, commanded by Colonel General Adolf Strauß.

After participating in the first great encirclement at Minsk, the 161st had to march hard to catch up with the fighting to the east, eventually helping to relieve the mobile units of 3rd Panzer Group for other tasks. By mid August the division was part of the 9th Army's eastern front north of Smolensk. On 17 August the division was hit by a massive attack, a main component of Timoshenko's counter offensive, which was aimed at disrupting German offensive action and recapturing lost ground in the Smolensk region. Virtually the whole of the Soviet 19th Army attack sector fell upon the 161st Division and its forward defenses were overrun by 4 Russian infantry divisions and a tank division. In one week's fighting the division lost 75% of its combat strength and much equipment and had to be pulled out of line and replaced by the 14th Infantry Division (mot).

By the year's end the division had suffered a staggering 7,192 casualties since the start of Operation Barbarossa, including 252 officer casualties, and of these 1,722 were killed.

=== 1942 On the defensive on the central front ===
Nevertheless, in spite of its loses, the division remained in line and in January 1942 the division was moved to the Rzhev front.

In August 1942 the 161st sector was again the focus of a major Soviet offensive, this time Zhukov's attempt to eliminate the Rzhev salient. "In the morning of 4 August, Thirty-first {Russian} Army surged into and over the 161st Infantry division on an eight-mile stretch east of Zubstov. The break through was complete almost at once. By Dark, the only trace of the former front was the occasional white flares that were sent up, here and there, by a bypassed strong point." The remnants of the division were forced back onto Zubstov. The situation for 9th Army was precarious and its grip on Rzhev tenuous, so in spite of its battered state the 161st had to stay in line, as reinforcements were rushed to the area.

The fighting continued into the second half of September, and after finally subsiding, the depleted division was posted to France to rebuild in November 1942. By December the 161st was located in the Pas-de-Calais area, on the channel coast absorbing replacements.

The German 161st Infantry division participated in the Battle of Kursk, under the 42nd Army Corps whose other divisions were the 39th and the 282nd Infantry divisions. During the battle, the 161st was responsible for protecting the flank of the 3rd Panzer Corps.

In November 1943 the remaining combat elements of the division were incorporated into Korps Abteilung A, and the formation was effectively dissolved.

=== The end in Romania ===
The division was reformed in July 1944, as an infantry division again by redesignating Korps Abteilung A. It was on the defensive in southern Ukraine on the Romanian border under LII Corps of the 6th Army.

Its second life however only lasted a few weeks as on 20 August the Russian 2nd and 3rd Ukrainian Fronts unleashed the Jassy–Kishinev Offensive, a major offensive into Romania. These forces blasted huge holes in the Axis front and within 3 days encircled most of the ill-fated 6th Army, including the 161st Division, near Jassy. The encirclements were reduced within a few days and the trapped German units completely destroyed. The division was officially disbanded in October 1944 and not rebuilt.

== Commanding officers ==
- Generalleutnant Hermann Wilck, 1 December 1939 – 17 September 1941
- Generalleutnant Heinrich Recke, 17 September 1941 – 15 August 1942
- Generalmajor Otto Schell, 15 – 22 August 1942
- Generalleutnant Karl-Albrecht von Groddeck, 22 August 1942 – 28 August 1943
- Generalmajor Paul Drekmann, 28 August – 15 November 1943
- Generalmajor Paul Drekmann, 27 July – 5 September 1944
