= Heinrich Recke =

- Born: 25 August 1890; Konitz, West Prussia, German Empire (today Poland)
- Died: 18 August 1943 (aged 52); Near Kharkov, Soviet Union
- Military career
- Allegiance: German Empire; Weimar Republic; Nazi Germany
- Branch: Army
- Rank: Generalleutnant
- Commands: 332. Infanterie-Division; 161. Infanterie-Division
- Conflicts: World War II
- Awards: Knight's Cross of the Iron Cross

Heinrich Recke (25 August 1890 – 18 August 1943) was a German general in the Wehrmacht during World War II who commanded several infantry divisions. He was a recipient of the Knight's Cross of the Iron Cross of Nazi Germany.

== Awards and decorations ==
- Knight's Cross of the Iron Cross on 4 September 1943 as Generalleutnant and commander of 161. Infanterie-Division
