= Emil Albert Friedberg =

German canonist

Emil Albert Friedberg (22 December 1837, in Konitz – 7 September 1910, in Leipzig) was a German canonist.

Friedberg was born at Konitz, Province of Prussia. His Jewish parents had joined the Evangelical Church in Prussia before his birth, letting him baptised Protestant. Friedberg was educated at Berlin and Heidelberg. After having been a member of the faculty at Berlin, Halle, and Freiberg, he was appointed professor at Leipzig in 1869.

The new critical edition of the Corpus Juris Canonici (1879–81) was prepared by Friedberg, as was also the Formelbuch des deutschen Handels-, Wechsel-, und Seerechts (third edition, 1894). Alike in his collaboration in the Prussian church laws of 1872 and as an author, he showed himself a champion of state supremacy in ecclesiastical matters, and many of his works deal with this subject in its various bearings. Perhaps the best known of his numerous publications are the following:

- Die Geschichte der Zivilehe (second edition, 1877)
- Lehrbuch des katholischen und evangelischen Kirchenrechts (fifth edition, 1903)
- Verfassungsgesetze der evangelisch-deutschen Landeskirchen (1885, et seq.).
