= Walter Melzer =

Nazi German general

- Born: 7 October 1894
- Died: 23 June 1961 (aged 66)
- Military career
- Allegiance: German Empire; Weimar Republic; Nazi Germany
- Branch: German Army
- Service years: 1914–1945
- Rank: General der Infanterie
- Commands: 252nd Infantry Division; XXIII Army Corps
- Conflicts: World War I; World War II; Invasion of Poland; Battle of Belgium; Battle of France; Battle of Dunkirk; Operation Barbarossa; Siege of Leningrad; Battle of Voronezh (1942); Operation Bagration; Vilnius Offensive; Baltic Offensive (1944); Battle of Memel; East Prussian Offensive
- Awards: Knight's Cross of the Iron Cross with Oak Leaves

Walter Melzer (7 October 1894 – 23 June 1961) was a general in the Wehrmacht of Nazi Germany during World War II who commanded the XXIII corps. He was a recipient of the Knight's Cross of the Iron Cross with Oak Leaves.

== Awards and decorations ==
- Iron Cross (1914) 2nd Class (9 August 1915) & 1st Class (10 March 1918)
- Clasp to the Iron Cross (1939) 2nd Class (16 September 1939) & 1st Class (3 October 1939)
- German Cross in Gold on 11 February 1943 as Oberst in Grenadier-Regiment 694
- Knight's Cross of the Iron Cross with Oak Leaves
  - Knight's Cross on 21 August 1941 as Oberst and commander of Infanterie-Regiment 151
  - Oak Leaves on 23 August 1944 as Generalleutnant and commander of 252. Infanterie-Division

Military offices
Preceded by Generalleutnant Hans Schäfer	Commander of 252. Infanterie-Division; 24 January 1943 - 12 October 1944	Succeeded by Generalleutnant Paul Drekmann
Preceded by General der Pioniere Otto Tiemann	Commander of XXIII. Armeekorps; 12 October 1944 - May 1945	Succeeded by None
