= Battle of Chojnice (1656) =

1656 battle

Coordinates: 53°42′00″N 17°34′00″E

- Part of the Second Northern War / The Deluge
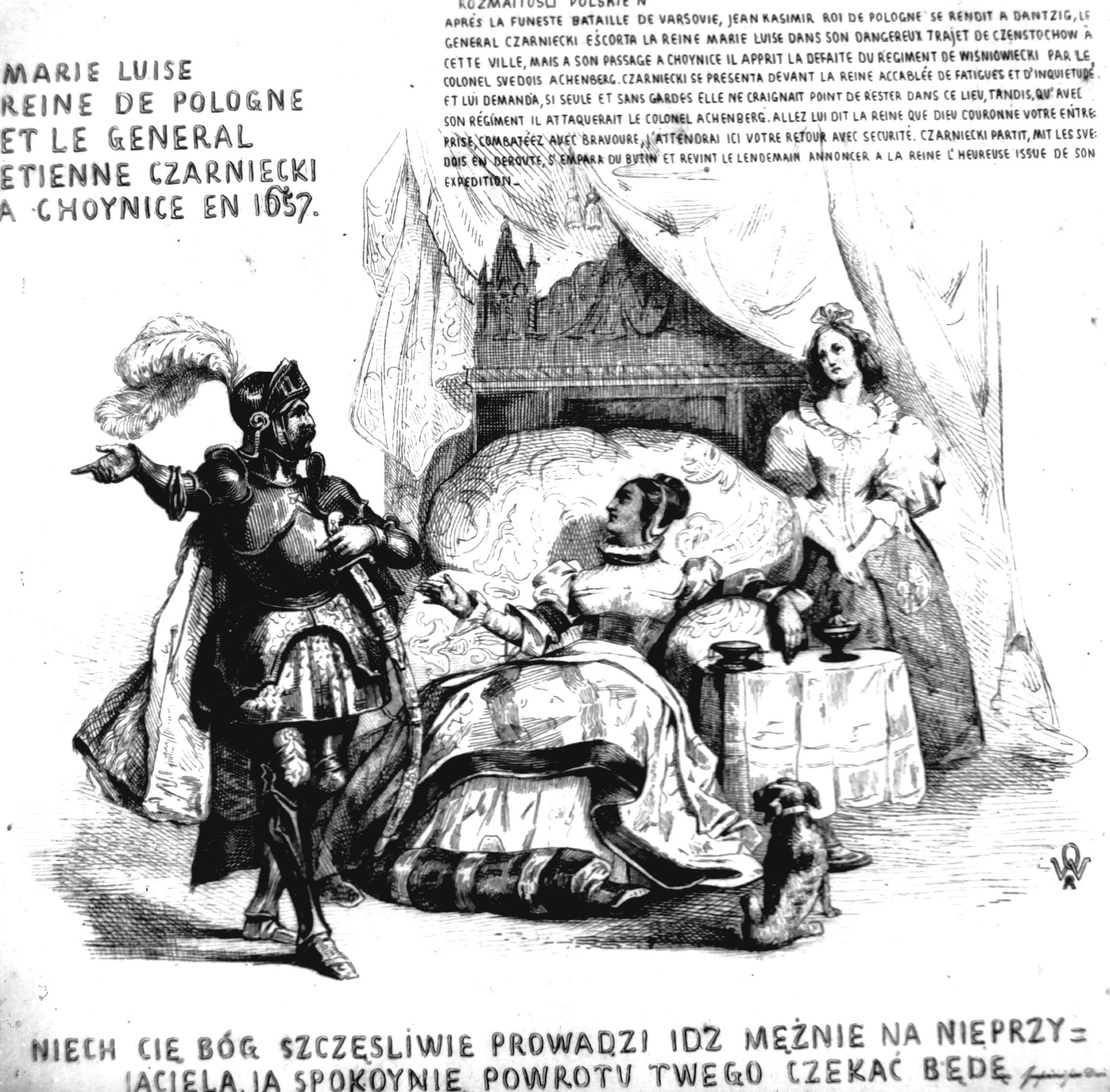
- 19th century picture showing Stefan Czarniecki and Polish queen Maria Gonzaga at Chojnice
Date	December 25, 1656 or January 2/3, 1657
Location	Chojnice, Poland
Result	See Aftermath

Belligerents
(Swedish Empire) Sweden	Polish–Lithuanian Commonwealth

Commanders and leaders
(Swedish Empire) Rutger von Ascheberg	(Polish–Lithuanian Commonwealth) Stefan Czarniecki

Strength
950 cavalry of vanguard, unknown number of main army	10,000 cavalry

Casualties and losses
Polish accounts: 300 dead, many prisoners and 3 banners taken Swedish accounts: Very light	Swedish accounts: 3,500 killed and 2,600 horses captured along with 36 banners

The Battle of Chojnice, also known as the Battle of Konitz, was a surprise nighttime attack followed by a run-and-chase battle during The Deluge.

== Prelude ==
Towards the end of 1656, the Swedish army was blocking Polish King John Casimir in Gdańsk who was conducting diplomatic negotiations with French King Louis XIV's envoy Antoine de Lumbres. Polish Queen Marie Louise Gonzaga wanted to join her husband there but she needed the Polish armies to open a passage to Gdańsk through the blockading Swedish armies. Charles X Gustav of Sweden was willing to allow her to cross over to her husband but she refused this courtesy, relying instead on her regimentarz Stefan Czarnieckki, stationed with his division at Piotrków Trybunalski. Czarniecki came to Wolbórz where she was stationed and together they began the so-called 'Gdańsk expedition'. On or about January 1, 1657, Czarniecki with his division and the queen and her courtiers with her own wagon train in his wagon train came to Chojnice. Also army divisions of grand Crown hetman Stanisław Rewera Potocki and field crown hetman Stanisław Lanckoroński joined them at Chojnice about the same time. Polish cavalry companies settled in the surrounding countryside, occupying villages and being separated one from another by distance, need for fodder and food, and winter snows.

== Battle ==
Different sources give different renditions of the battle.

One version goes like this: the Swedish King must have received information about this winter concentration of Polish army divisions at Chojnice during the last days of 1656 and apparently started marching towards them with his own forces, perhaps intending to surprise them in their winter lodgings. Swedish army came up to Chojnice on the night of January 2, 1657, and the first to attack was the Swedish vanguard under Rutger von Ascheberg, commanding almost 1,000 horsemen (reiters). His command attacked immediately the following Polish formations: pułk of prince Konstanty Wiśniowiecki, banners of Jan Sobieski and Koniecpolski. Polish losses, listed for the battle, were sustained during that phase of the battle -according to des Noyers' reports. Runaways from the Wisniowiecki's command spread the alarm across the entire town of Chojnice and surrounding Polish war camps. It gave ample time to other Polish units to assemble and meet the enemy on equal terms and use their numerical superiority.

Ar some moment heavy night fighting reached the queen's wagon train and she had to seek shelter, perhaps in the town itself. Once her majesty queen was safe she then gave blessing to Czarniecki so he could come to the rescue of prince Wisniowiecki pulk. And perhaps other Polish army divisions came to give more coordinated response to the Swedish vanguard onslaught, and as the break of dawn of January 3, 1657 was slowly approaching. Perhaps at that moment quite victorious Swedish commander must have realized that he had stepped into the hornets' nest and begun hasty retreat - according to des Noyers bride abattue. His retreat was towards the old Teutonic Knights fortress at Czŀuchów, in Swedish hands, and to his king's army, still en route to the Chojnice battlefield. The surprise night attack came to cost him dearly, as Czarniecki division had come to pursue him, and Swedish command never turned their head to face their pursuers, and his retreat turned into run-and-chase battle, and the Swedish cavalry became Polish prey, thus sustaining 300 dead and many taken prisoners - including 50 Frenchmen serving with the Swedes, and amongst other trophies Poles captured 3 cornet banners. Swedish cavalry found refuge in the Czŀuchów castle and the fortress soldiers fired their artillery at the pursuing Polish cavalry who then abandoned their pursuit, unprepared to assault this old Teutonic stronghold and perhaps in light of the king Charles X Gustav forces on a march towards Chojnice. Therefore, shortly after their disengagement from the pursuit of the Swedish cavalry, the Polish commanders decided to avoid any further engagement with the Swedes and to withdraw their force and wagon trains from Chojnice towards Nakło nad Notecią, which they reached on January 7, 1658.

Polish army sustained light casualties: less than 50 killed and wounded, and 9 taken prisoner, number of horses and wagons were also taken in the initial surprise attack.

According to other sources, the Swedish cavalry troops of 950 men reached some villages outside Chojnice early on December 25, 1656. In these villages, Polish troops had stopped for the night. After covering a bridge with straw to decrease the sound from the hoofs of the horses, the Swedish cavalry sneaked across the bridge and attacked their unknowing enemies. They put houses on fire and slaughtered Polish soldiers that heavy with sleep came out. When the morning came, the Swedish force had killed more than 3,000 Polish soldiers and captured 2,600 riding animals. Soon afterwards the main Swedish army reached the area and initiated a bombardment of Chojnice. After the surrender of Chojnice on 1 January 1657, the Swedish had reached their goal and trapped the Polish king in Gdańsk.

As a token of his appreciation, king Charles Gustav gave Rutger von Ascheberg a rapier he had used in battle. von Ascheberg also received valuable jewellery and an estate in Prussia.

== Aftermath ==
Both the Polish and the Swedish side declared themselves victorious in the battle.

The Polish troops, vastly outnumbered, soon managed to ensure the safety of their queen, and the Swedes began to retreat. In pursuit, Czarniecki inflicted great losses on them, knocking out 1/3 of the Swedish soldiers, but faced with the approaching main force of Charles Gustav, the Poles retreated towards Nakło.

From their camp at Kcynia near Nakło, Polish commanders and the queen haggled a bit about the pay for their soldiers, who had demanded it. Marie Louise Gonzaga decided to pay soldiers from her own sources. As a result, Czarniecki (with 6000 cavalry) and the queen (and her wagon train and courtiers) went on to complete their Gdańsk Expedition and eventually joined their Polish king at Gdańsk unmolested. The other Polish commanders stayed south of Gdansk Pomerania. They were to fight many more battles against the Swedes and their allies in the upcoming months and years.

Other sources claim something different. After trapping king John Casimir in Gdańsk, the Swedish army tried to stop Polish cavalry trying to break through and rescue the king. The cavalry was led by Stefan Czarniecki and financed by the queen herself. She had tried to convince the leaders of the Polish army to rescue the king, but they had been unwilling to agree, blaming the soldiers that were hungry and had not received their pay. After some relatively small encounters, the Polish stopped their efforts. Then, the Swedish troops were sent to relieve the besieged Tykocin. A renewed and daring attempt from Czarniecki, in which he and 2,000 chosen horsemen rode 280 kilometres in three days, was a success. They reached Gdańsk and rescued their king.

== Bibliography ==
- Lettres de Pierre Des Noyers, secretaire de la reine de Pologne Marie-Louise de Gonzague, pour servir a l’histoire de Pologne et de Suede de 1655 a 1659, p. 289 - 290.
- Leszek Podhorodecki, Rapier i koncerz, Warszawa 1985, ISBN 83-05-11452-X, p. 331-332
- Adam Kersten, Stefan Czarniecki 1599 - 1665, Warszawa 1963, p. 316 - 317.
- Michał Dymitr Krajewski, Dzieje panowania Jana Kazimierza od roku 1656 do jego abdykacyi w roku 1668. S. Orgelbrand, 1846, p. 27-29.
- Michał Dymitr Krajewski, Historya Stefana na Czarncy Czarnieckiego, wojewody kijowskiego, hetmana polnego koronnego, Nakład Wydawn. Biblioteki Polskiej, 1859. p. 87-88.
