= Karl-Albrecht von Groddeck =

- Born: 18 February 1894
- Died: 10 January 1944 (aged 49); Breslau, Silesia
- Military career
- Allegiance: German Empire; Weimar Republic; Nazi Germany
- Branch: Army
- Rank: Generalleutnant (Posthumously)
- Commands: 161. Infanterie-Division
- Conflicts: World War I World War II: Battle of France; Operation Barbarossa; Battle of Uman; Battle of Rostov (1941); Battle of the Kerch Peninsula; Belgorod-Khar'kov Offensive Operation †
- Awards: Knight's Cross of the Iron Cross

Karl-Albrecht von Groddeck (18 February 1894 – 10 January 1944) was a German general in the Wehrmacht during World War II who commanded several divisions. He was a recipient of the Knight's Cross of the Iron Cross of Nazi Germany. He died from wounds on 10 January 1944 in a Breslau hospital and was posthumously promoted to Generalleutnant.

== Awards and decorations ==
- Knight's Cross of the Iron Cross on 8 September 1941 as Oberst and commander of Infanterie-Regiment 120 (mot.)

Military offices
Preceded by Generalmajor Otto Schell	Commander of 161. Infanterie-Division; 22 August 1943 – 28 August 1943	Succeeded by Generalleutnant Paul Drekmann
