= Cẩm Phả (city) =

Cẩm Phả City Thành phố Cẩm Phả
- Provincial city (Class-II)
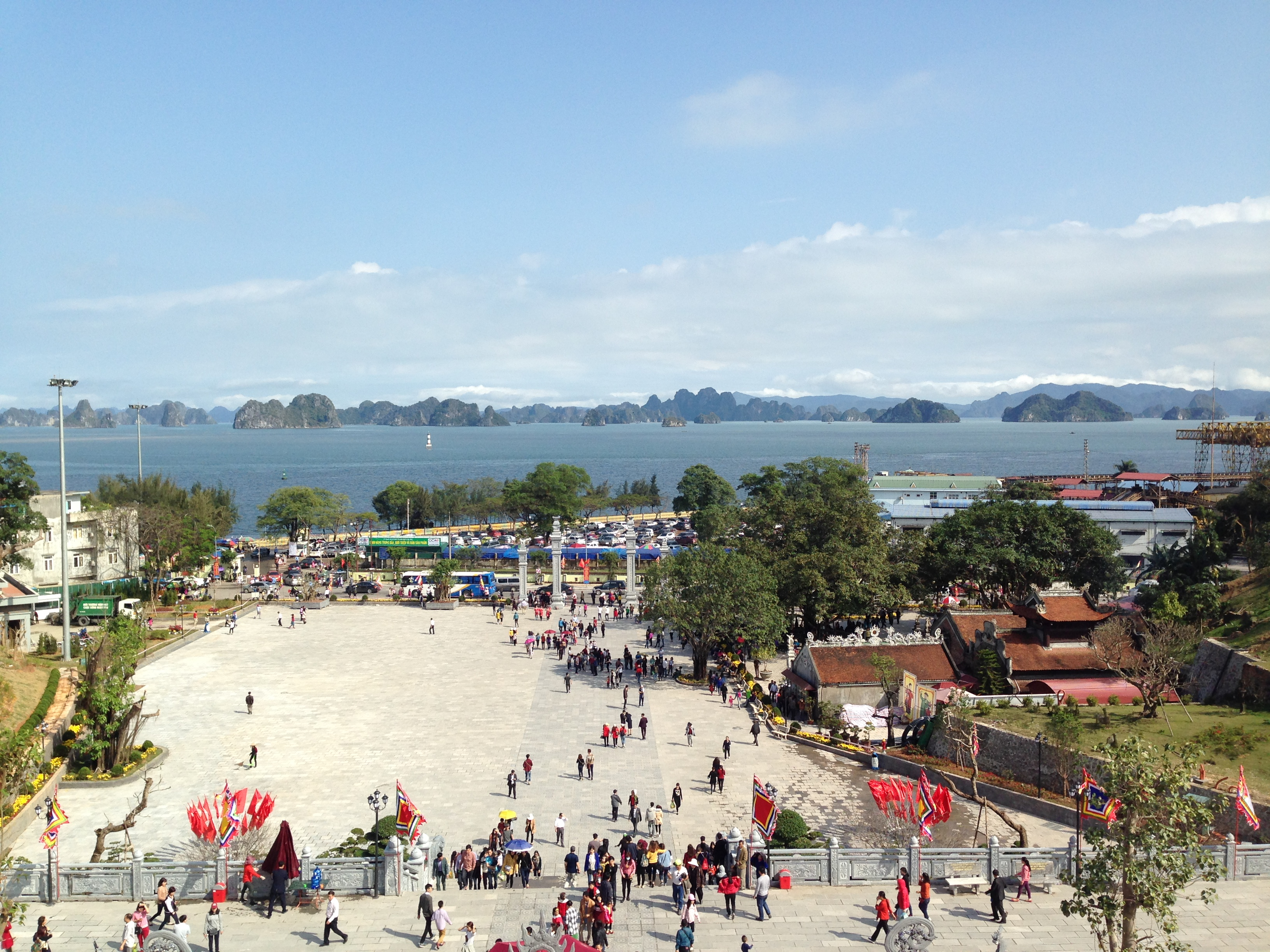
- View of Bái Tử Long bay from Cửa Ông temple.

- Seal
- Nicknames: "Mineland" (Đất mỏ) "Beautiful Bay" (Vũng vàng)
- Motto: "Convergence of the miner culture, spread love from coal area" (Hội tụ văn hóa thợ mỏ, lan tỏa tình yêu vùng than)
- Location within Vietnam Location within Southeast Asia Location within Asia
- Coordinates: 21°01′N 107°19′E
- Country: Vietnam
- Region: Red River Delta
- Province: Quảng Ninh
- Establishment: February 21, 2012
- Central hall: No.376, Trấn Phù road, Cẩm Thành ward

Government
  - Type: Municipality
  - People Committee's Chairman: Vũ Quyết Tiến
  - People Council's chairman: Trần Văn Hùng
  - Front Committee's chairman: Nguyễn Thị Phương
  - Party Committee's Secretary: Trần Văn Hùng

Area
  - Total: 48,645 km^{2} (18,782 sq mi)
- Elevation: 70 m (230 ft)

Population (2019 census)
  - Total: 190,232
  - Density: 3.9106/km^{2} (10.128/sq mi)
- Time zone: UTC+7 (UTC + 7)
- ZIP code: 01250
- Climate: Cwa
- Website: CamPha Homepage

Cẩm Phả ([kə̰m˧˩˧ :pʰa]) is a former provincial city of the former Quảng Ninh province in the Red River Delta region of Vietnam.

== History ==
=== Middle Ages ===
Its name Cẩm-phả (锦普) means "splendor and spaciousness" in Hanese text. By researcher Trần Chí Dõi, according to some records since the end of the 18th century, this name was created by the Tanka people, who could be pirates that often traveling to Hạ Long Bay. Initially it was just an adjective to point out a stone bund protruding at the edge of the bay (bãi đá lô nhô sát mép vịnh) and there was very little attention.

In 1884, Cẩm Phả came under French administration. On 24 August 1886, Bavienpour established the coal company Công ty Pháp mỏ than Bắc Kỳ (French: Société Francais des Charbonneges du Ton-Kin; SFCT). SFCT had the right to manage and exploit coal in the Hòn Gai, Cẩm Phả, and Mông Dương regions.

=== XX century ===
On 27 September 1945, during the August Revolution, workers drove the French out of Cẩm Phả. The French troops returned in November 1946, but the inhabitants fought back, destroying the coal mines, and hundreds of people were killed. The last French soldier withdrew from Cửa Ông, near the Cẩm Phả area on 22 April 1955.

During the Vietnam War, the US aircraft bombed Cẩm Phả several times due to its strategic importance.

On 30 October 1963 Cẩm Phả, formerly in Hồng Quảng province, came under the jurisdiction of Quảng Ninh province when Hải Ninh and Hồng Quảng provinces merged.

On 10 September 1981 Cẩm Phả's boundaries were redistributed. The town of Mông Dương was dissolved to form Mông Dương ward and Cẩm Hải commune. Cửa Ông town became Cửa Ông ward. Cọc Sáu town and Thái Bình commune became Cẩm Phú and Cẩm Thịnh wards.

Cẩm Phả is an important coal exporting port of modern Vietnam (UNCTAD : VNCPH). As of 2019, the city had a population of 190,232. The city covers an area of 486 km^{2}. The city was promoted from Cẩm Phả Rural District by February 2012. Cẩm Phả was the site of one of the biggest coal mines in south of Asia which has been exploited for almost a century. (Note: T. H. Yellowdawn (2008). Fermented Foods : Naturally Enzymatic Therapy. p. 274 : "Cẩm Phả is a town in Vietnam, where was the place of coal mine, the biggest coal industry in South of Asia has been exploited in almost a century, close to seashore of Ha Long Bay, where is the eighth wonderful scenery of thousand...".) The coal mine featured on a special commemorative Vietnam stamp in March 1959. Coal still forms the basis of Cẩm Phả's local economy, with other industries including quarrying, lime production, port, agriculture, forestry and fisheries.

The official town website claims several scenic and historical sites in Cẩm Phả, including the Cửa Ông Temple, Rều Island (Monkey Island), Thẻ Vàng Island, the Vũng Đục historical site, and Hang Hanh cave.

Though the port of Cẩm Phả has a general maximum draft of 4.8 metres, it has a separate coal loading terminal with a dredged depth of 6.1 metres and a channel depth of 7.1 metres. This allows ships of up to 10 metres draft to load due to the tidal range in the port. The coal loading terminal is 299 metres long, and can accommodate ships that are 165 metres in length, at an average loading rate of 6,000 tonnes per day.

=== XXI century ===
On 21 February 2012 Cẩm Phả was upgraded from the town to the city.

== Geography ==
Cẩm Phả city contains :

- 13 wards : Quang Hanh, Cẩm Thạch, Cẩm Thủy, Cẩm Trung, Cẩm Thành, Cẩm Tây, Cẩm Bình, Cẩm Đông, Cẩm Sơn, Cẩm Phú, Cẩm Thịnh, Cửa Ông, Mông Dương.
- 3 communes : Dương Huy, Cộng Hòa, Cẩm Hải.

Besides, most of the isles in Bái Tử Long Bay have not been yet updated with their official name because there are no residents.

Danh sách các đơn vị hành chính trực thuộc thành phố Cẩm Phả

Name	Area (km^{2})	Population
Ward (13)
Cẩm Bình	1.38	8.423
Cẩm Đông	6.95	10.483
Cẩm Phú	8.53	15.840
Cẩm Sơn	10.15	17.079
Cẩm Tây	4.88	7.426
Cẩm Thạch	4,31	12.999
Cẩm Thành	1.25	9.484
Cẩm Thịnh	5.87	9.759

Name	Area (km^{2})	Population
Cẩm Thủy	2.68	12.049
Cẩm Trung	5.07	14.744
Cửa Ông	10.96	17.008
Mông Dương	114.46	15.566
Quang Hanh	51.35	17.427
Commune (3)
Cẩm Hải	14.64	1.327
Cộng Hòa	50.88	3.184
Dương Huy	46.77	3.207

=== Tourism ===
Cẩm Phả's non-industrial area is known as one of the 10 most famous landscapes in Vietnam.

Since the limited policy of coal mining to conserve resources for the future was implemented (2011), some mines in Cọc Sáu, Mông Dương, Hồng Dương have been quickly renovated into an eco-tourism place combined with learning. The city government has called this new trend as "coal tourism" (du lịch than), which is thought to contribute to the conversion of the economy from maroon (processing coal) to green (resort).

Cửa Ông Rock Beach ("the duke port") is recorded as a defense line which Duke Trần Quốc Tảng set up to fight against the Mongolian navy in the 13th century. Besides : Bái Tử Long Bay, Campha Coal Museum, Hanh Caves, Vũng Đục Beach, Ông Cụ Isle, Quan Lạn Bund...

=== Environment ===
Coal mining in Cẩm Phả started over 100 years ago. Mining area discharges to the sea about 9 million m^{3} waste water and 8 million m^{3} domestic waste water. Another issue is deforestation, for example, from 1969 to 1974, about 42% of area of forest land was reduced.

=== Climate ===
Climate data for Cẩm Phả (Cửa Ông)
Month	Jan	Feb	Mar	Apr	May	Jun	Jul	Aug	Sep	Oct	Nov	Dec	Year
Record high °C (°F)	28.7 (83.7)	29.8 (85.6)	33.5 (92.3)	34.6 (94.3)	36.1 (97.0)	37.4 (99.3)	38.8 (101.8)	36.9 (98.4)	36.2 (97.2)	34.8 (94.6)	33.0 (91.4)	29.6 (85.3)	38.8 (101.8)
Mean daily maximum °C (°F)	18.8 (65.8)	19.2 (66.6)	21.9 (71.4)	26.3 (79.3)	30.6 (87.1)	31.8 (89.2)	32.1 (89.8)	31.7 (89.1)	30.9 (87.6)	28.6 (83.5)	25.2 (77.4)	21.3 (70.3)	26.5 (79.7)
Daily mean °C (°F)	15.5 (59.9)	16.3 (61.3)	19.0 (66.2)	23.0 (73.4)	26.7 (80.1)	28.2 (82.8)	28.5 (83.3)	27.8 (82.0)	26.8 (80.2)	24.6 (76.3)	21.0 (69.8)	17.3 (63.1)	22.9 (73.2)
Mean daily minimum °C (°F)	13.4 (56.1)	14.5 (58.1)	17.1 (62.8)	20.9 (69.6)	24.2 (75.6)	25.7 (78.3)	25.9 (78.6)	25.2 (77.4)	24.2 (75.6)	21.8 (71.2)	18.4 (65.1)	14.8 (58.6)	20.5 (68.9)
Record low °C (°F)	3.8 (38.8)	4.7 (40.5)	6.0 (42.8)	11.1 (52.0)	16.8 (62.2)	17.9 (64.2)	20.9 (69.6)	20.5 (68.9)	16.6 (61.9)	13.3 (55.9)	8.2 (46.8)	5.0 (41.0)	3.8 (38.8)
Average rainfall mm (inches)	35.0 (1.38)	29.1 (1.15)	50.1 (1.97)	92.6 (3.65)	196.5 (7.74)	312.1 (12.29)	414.9 (16.33)	504.8 (19.87)	346.7 (13.65)	156.3 (6.15)	56.2 (2.21)	22.4 (0.88)	1,935.6 (76.20)
Average rainy days	8.4	11.4	14.8	11.8	12.0	15.3	16.7	18.6	13.7	8.9	6.0	5.8	143.3
Average relative humidity (%)	81.6	86.0	87.9	86.8	83.7	84.5	84.2	85.7	82.7	79.0	77.7	77.2	83.1
Mean monthly sunshine hours	63.4	46.7	37.6	81.8	158.8	153.5	177.0	161.2	164.3	165.0	139.6	99.1	1,448
Source: Vietnam Institute for Building Science and Technology

== Culture ==
=== Arts ===
Cẩm Phả is the place to mark the maturity of many Vietnamese artists, who are from the working class. That comes from the very vibrant collective music movement maintained in every trade union.

Typically two top opera voices : Quang Thọ and Lê Dung. Besides, two sopranos Nông Xuân Ái and Tiến Hỷ ; tenor Quang Phòng ; V-pop songstress Hồ Quỳnh Hương.

In the field of literature, writer Võ Khắc Nghiêm came from a coal miner, so his life was attached to the works of Cẩm Phả and the people of that land. His novel Life of a Young Woman (Mảnh đời của Huệ) has resonated and even made a famous TV drama.

=== Sports ===
In the decades from the 1920s to 1990s, the mass sports movement has developed very strongly in Cẩm Phả to improve physical and mental health for workers. It was a positive reason that helped the sports delegations from Quảng Ninh regularly ranked first in the National Gymnastics and Sports Congress (Đại hội Thể dục Thể thao Toàn quốc).

However, starting in the late 1980s, when the subsidy policy was eliminated by the government of Vietnam, Cẩm Phả sports were increasingly stagnant and has been degraded very quickly. The most typical is the dissolution of the Quảng Ninh football team (Đoàn bóng đá Quảng Ninh) in 1991, which was headquartered in Cẩm Phả with most of its members who are mine workers. This event was considered a shock among Vietnam's fans at that time. The policy of remuneration was increasing, which was proportional to the narrowing of the coal mining scale, which is often considered by the Vietnam press as the cause of this leading sports industry degenerated.

About the beginning of the 2000s, when the equitization plan was applied, the positive economic growth was forced the Town People's Committee to consider shaping a movement that was their strengths.

Some Olympic competitions began to be concerned to build a team of highly competitive athletes. Besides football, badminton, tennis, shooting, swimming, canoeing, rowing and golf are very successful competitions of Cẩm Phả sports world.

The V.League 1 football club Than Quảng Ninh is based in Cẩm Phả. The club uses both Cửa Ông and Cẩm Phả stadia for its matches.

=== Landscapes ===
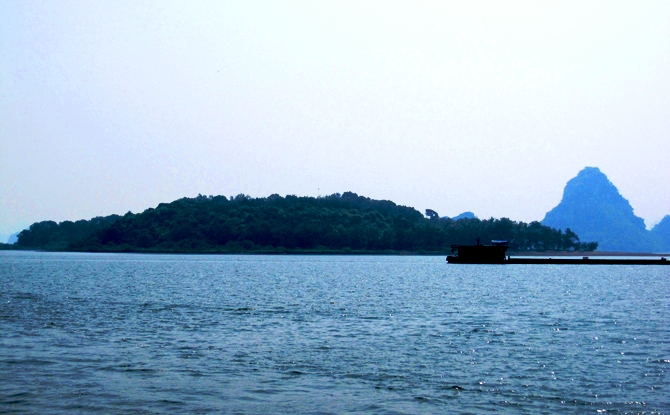
Monkey Island - Moss Island

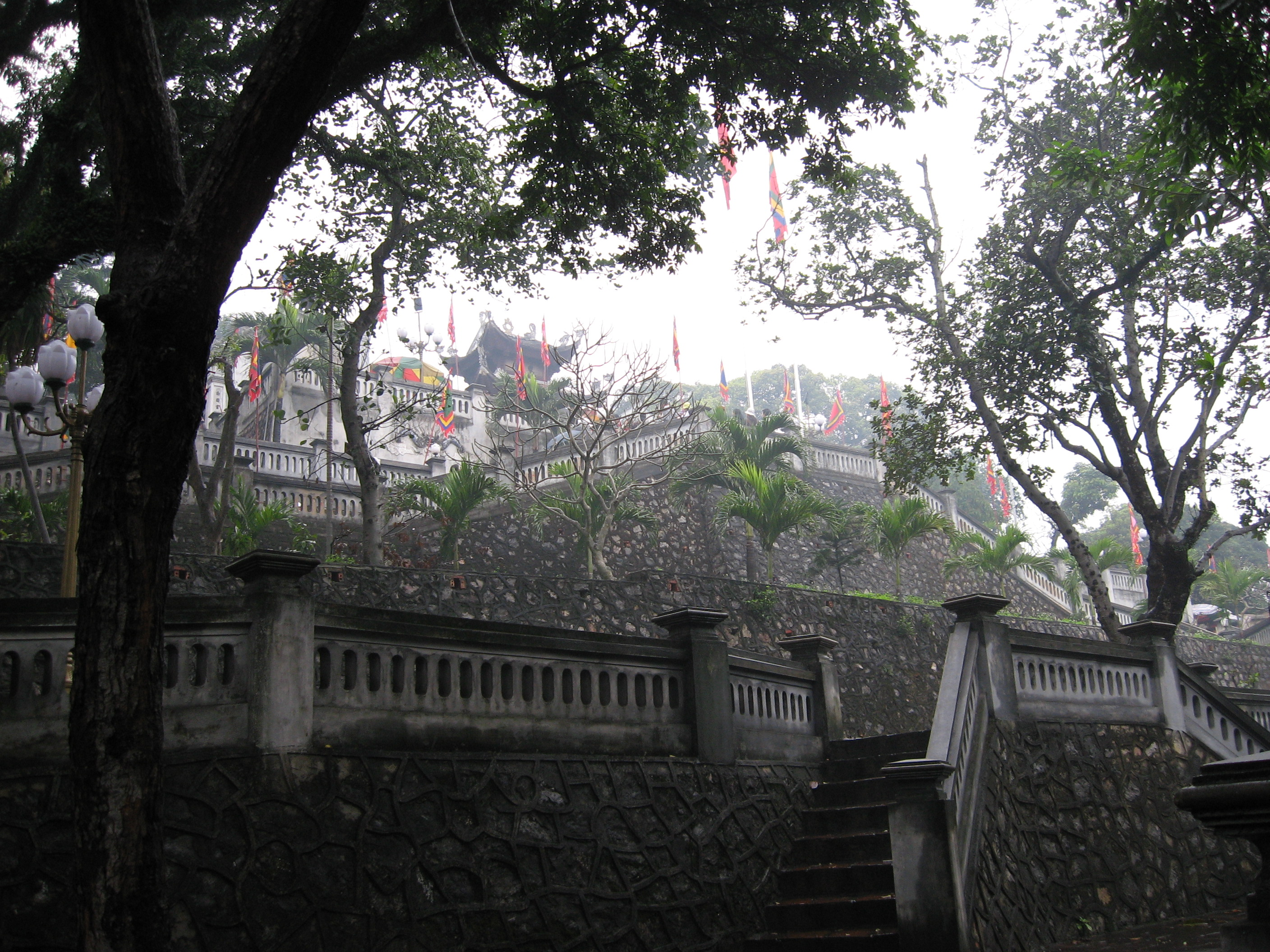
Cửa Ông Temple

== See also ==
- Móng Cái
- Uông Bí
