= USS Midway (CV-41) =

Midway-class aircraft carrier of the US Navy

Coordinates: 32.713789°N 117.174940°W

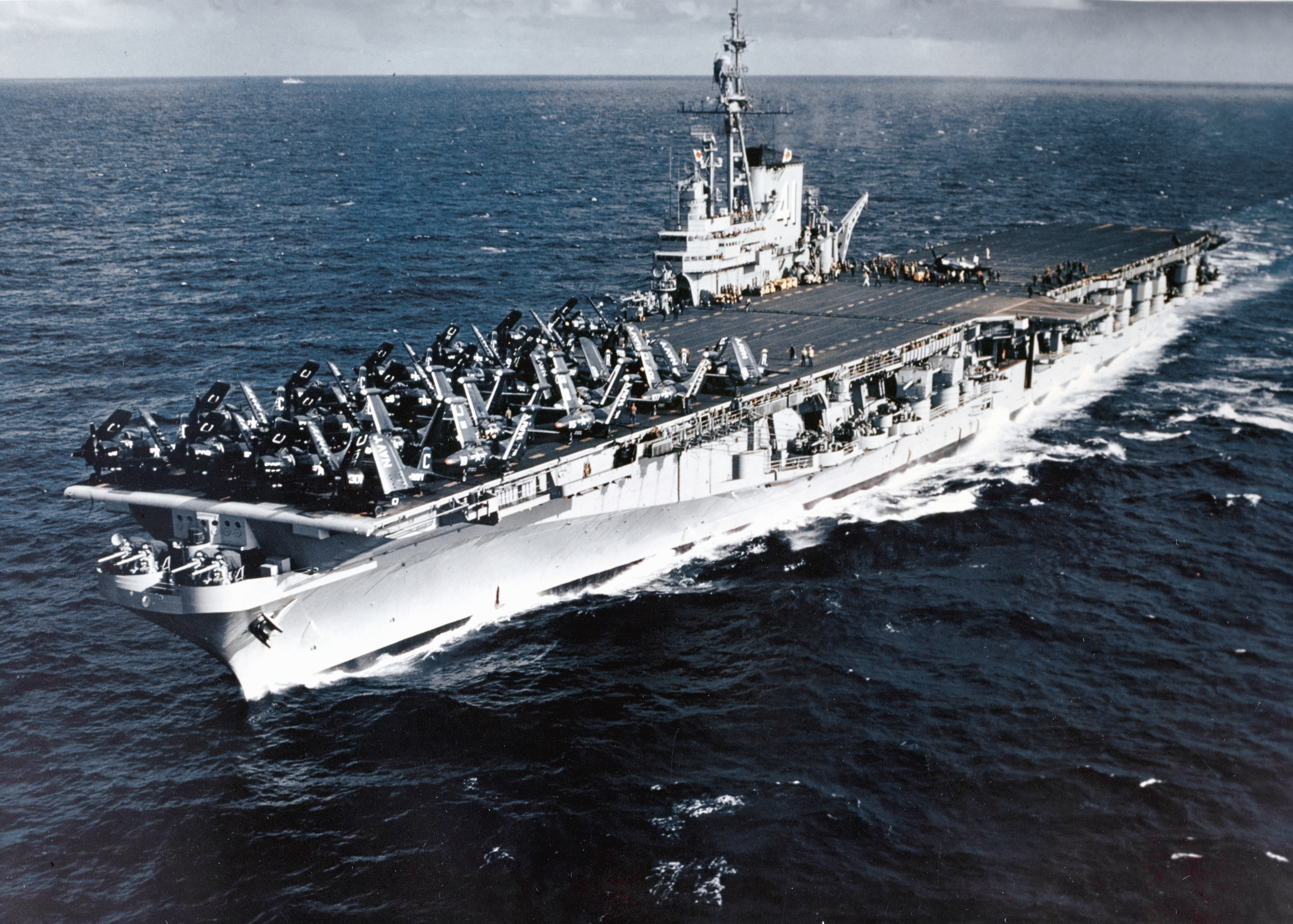
- USS Midway steaming off the Firth of Clyde in September 1952.

History

United States
- Name: Midway
- Namesake: Battle of Midway
- Ordered: 1 August 1942
- Builder: Newport News Shipbuilding
- Laid down: 27 October 1943
- Launched: 20 March 1945
- Sponsored by: Mrs. Bradford William Ripley, Jr
- Christened: 20 March 1945
- Acquired: 1 September 1945
- Commissioned: 10 September 1945
- Decommissioned: 11 April 1992
- Reclassified: CVB-41, 15 July 1943; CVA-41, 1 October 1952; CV-41, 30 June 1975
- Stricken: 17 March 1997
- Identification: Museum Ham callsign: NI6IW; Original callsign: NIIW
- Nickname(s): Midway Magic
- Status: Museum ship at the USS Midway Museum in San Diego, California
- Notes: Only carrier museum in the United States from WWII-era that is not of the Essex class
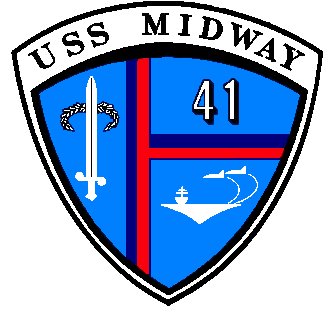
- Badge

General characteristics
- Class & type: Midway-class aircraft carrier
- Displacement: 45,000 tons at commissioning; 64,000 tons at decommissioning
- Length: 1,001 ft (305 m)
- Beam: 121 ft (37 m); 136 ft (41 m), 238 ft (73 m) at flight deck after modernization
- Draft: 34.5 ft (10.5 m)
- Propulsion: 12 boilers, four Westinghouse geared Steam turbines
- Speed: 33 kn (61 km/h; 38 mph)
- Complement: 4,104 officers and men
- Armament: As Built: 18 × 5 in (127 mm)/54 caliber guns; 21 × quad 40 mm Bofors gun; 28 × twin 20 mm Oerlikon cannon; After Refit: 2 8-cell Sea Sparrow launchers, 2 Phalanx CIWS
- Armor: Portside Belt: 7.6 inch; Starboard Belt: 7 inch; Lower Edge and Upper Belt: 1.96 inch; Flight Deck: 3.5 inch; Hangar Deck: 2 inch; 3rd Deck: 2 inch
- Aircraft carried: 137 theoretical, 100 (1940s–50s), 70 (Vietnam–retirement)

USS Midway (CVB/CVA/CV-41) is an aircraft carrier, formerly of the United States Navy, the lead ship of her class. Commissioned eight days after the end of World War II, Midway was the largest aircraft carrier in the world until 1955, as well as the first U.S. aircraft carrier too big to transit the Panama Canal. She operated for 47 years, during which time she saw action in the Vietnam War and served as the Persian Gulf flagship in 1991's Operation Desert Storm. Decommissioned in 1992, she is now a museum ship at the USS Midway Museum in San Diego, California.

USS Midway is the only preserved aircraft carrier that is not of the World War II-era Essex class.

== Service history ==
=== Early operations and deployment with the 6th Fleet ===
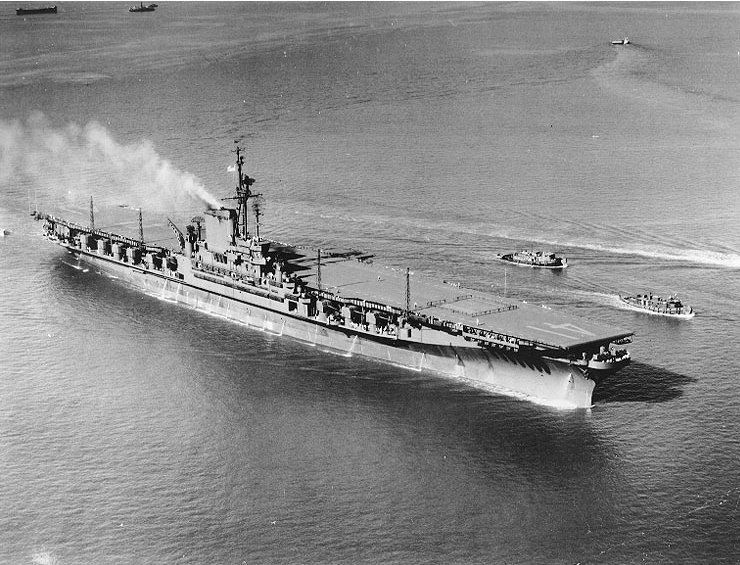
Midway after commissioning in September 1945

Midway was laid down 27 October 1943 in Shipway 11 at Newport News Shipbuilding Co., Newport News, Virginia; launched 20 March 1945, sponsored by Mrs. Bradford William Ripley Jr.; and commissioned on 10 September 1945 (eight days after the surrender of Japan) with Captain Joseph F. Bolger in command.

After shakedown in the Caribbean, Midway joined the U.S. Atlantic Fleet training schedule, with Norfolk as her homeport. From 20 February 1946, she was the flagship for Carrier Division 1. In March, she participated in Operation Frostbite testing the Ryan FR Fireball and helicopter rescue techniques for cold-weather operations in the Labrador Sea. In September 1947, a captured German V-2 rocket was test-fired from the flight deck in Operation Sandy, the first large-rocket launch from a moving platform, and the only moving-platform launch for a V-2. While the rocket lifted off, it then tilted and broke up at 15,000 feet (4,600 m).

On 29 October 1947, Midway sailed for the first of her annual deployments with the 6th Fleet in the Mediterranean. Between deployments, Midway trained and received alterations to accommodate heavier aircraft as they were developed.

In June 1951, Midway operated in the Atlantic off the Virginia Capes during carrier suitability tests of the F9F-5 Panther. On 23 June, as Cdr. George Chamberlain Duncan attempted a landing in BuNo 125228, a downdraft just aft of the stern caused Duncan to crash. His plane's forward fuselage broke away and rolled down the deck, and he suffered burns. Footage of the crash has been used in several films, including Men of the Fighting Lady, Midway, and The Hunt for Red October.

In 1952, the ship participated in Operation Mainbrace, North Sea maneuvers with NATO forces. Midway had an angled runway painted on the flight deck in May for touch-and-go landings following early trials of the technique aboard HMS Triumph. Successful demonstration of the possibilities caused widespread adoption of the angled flight deck in future aircraft carrier construction and modifications of existing carriers. On 1 October, the ship was redesignated CVA-41.

Midway left Norfolk 27 December 1954 for a world cruise, sailing via the Cape of Good Hope for Taiwan, where she became the first large carrier in the 7th Fleet for operations in the Western Pacific until 28 June 1955. During these operations, Midway pilots flew cover for the evacuation from the Tachen Islands during the Quemoy-Matsu crisis of 15,000 Chinese nationalist troops and 20,000 Chinese civilians, along with their livestock.

=== 1950s & 60s ===
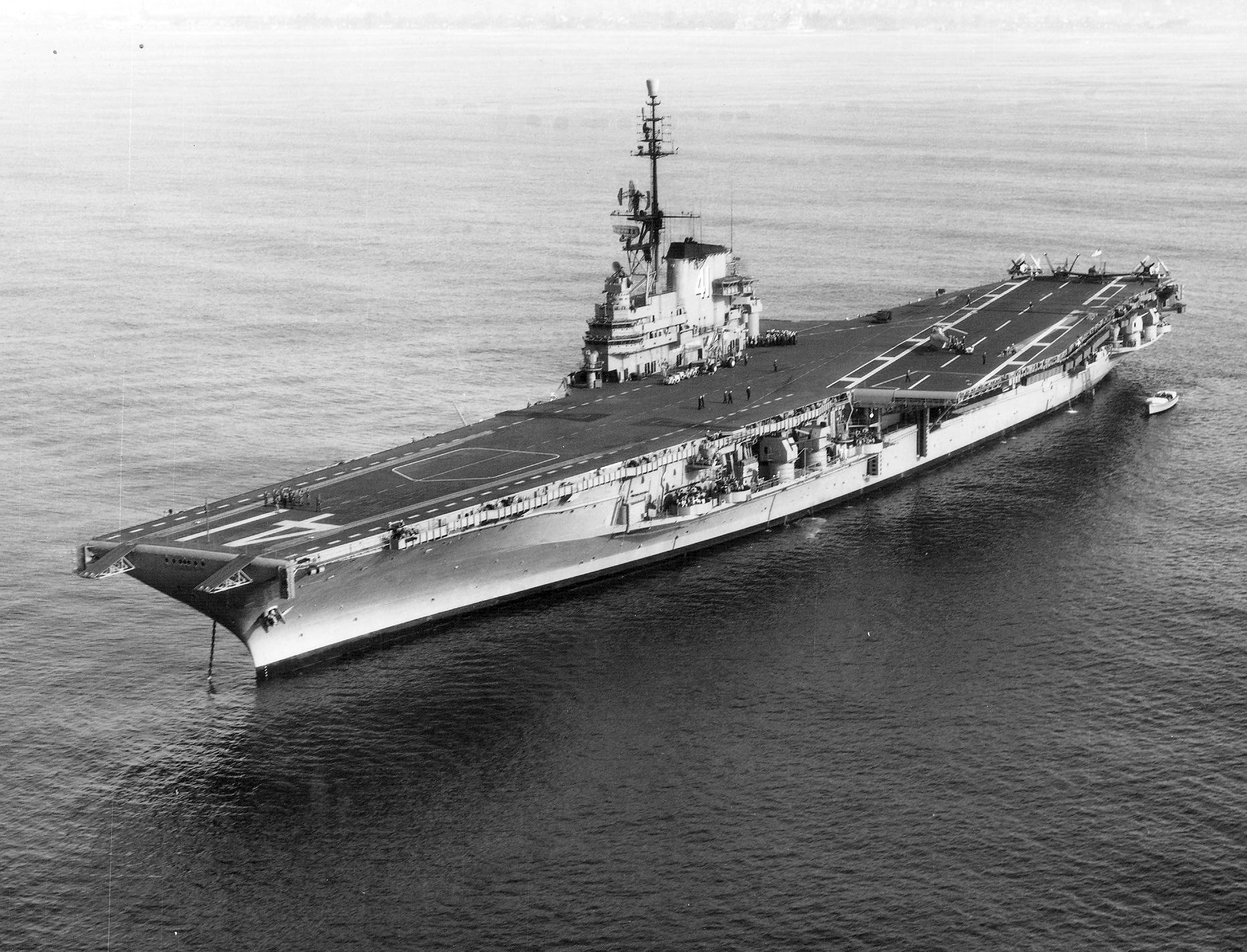
USS Midway in 1958

Controversy arose during the cruise when Midway around January 1955 docked in Cape Town, South Africa. Democratic senator Herbert Lehman sent a telegram to Secretary of the Navy Charles Thomas when he learned of a supposed United States Navy plan to segregate 400 non-white members of the crew of Midway while it was in Cape Town. Fellow Democratic senator Hubert Humphrey soon joined Lehman, additionally sending a letter to the Secretary of State John Foster Dulles, asking that "immediate steps be taken to see that equal treatment is given to American service personnel allowed shore leave in South Africa, or eliminate Cape Town as a port of call", and saying that "To me this is a shocking act of discrimination that should not be tolerated by our Government. Every American soldier or sailor is an American regardless of race, color or creed, and is entitled to be respected and treated as such anywhere in the world."

An anonymous Navy official stated that the Department of the Navy did not know of the arrangements that were to be made between the officers of Midway and South African authorities, and that African-American members of the crew would not be segregated while still aboard Midway.

Clarence Mitchell Jr. also urged Thomas not to allow Midway to dock at Cape Town. James H. Smith Jr., Acting Secretary of the Navy at the time, replied that the stop at Cape Town was merely to "satisfy an operational logistic requirement" and that it was customary to observe local laws and regulations while visiting foreign ports.

Captain Reynold Delos Hogle of Midway stated that while in port, Midway would be United States territory and federal United States laws would apply. In the end, the crew of Midway were not made to abide by apartheid, Captain Hogle stating that "At Hartleyvale (Stadium) this afternoon and at the concert to-night, European and non-European members of the crew have been asked to attend. There will be no segregation whatsoever".

==== Modernizations ====
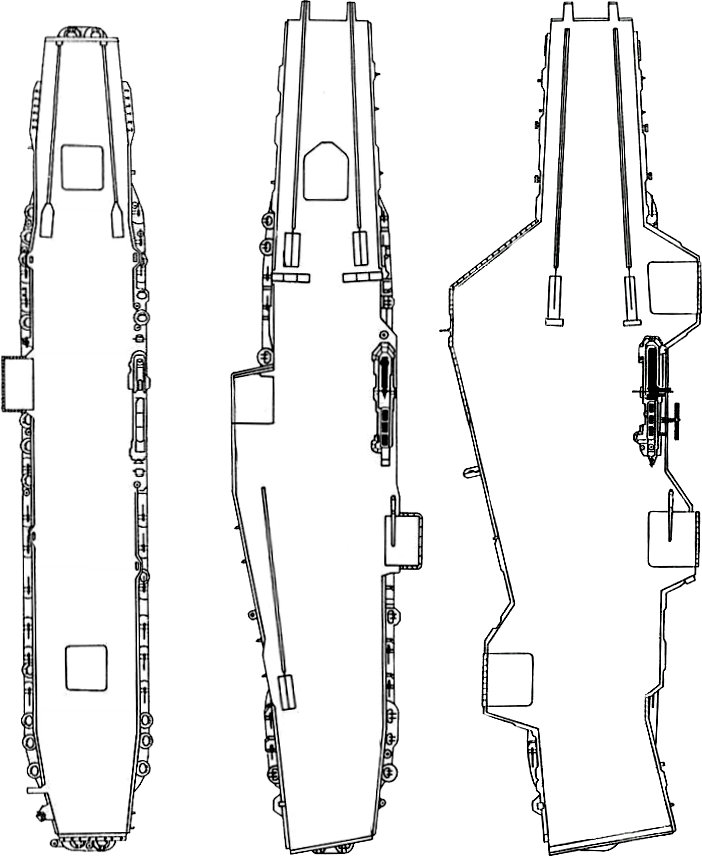
Deck plans for Midway: 1945, 1957 and 1970

On 28 June 1955, the ship sailed for Puget Sound Naval Shipyard, where Midway underwent an extensive modernization program (SCB-110, similar to SCB-125 for the Essex-class carriers). Midway received an enclosed hurricane bow, an aft deck-edge elevator, an angled flight deck, and steam catapults, before returning to service on 30 September 1957.

Home ported at Alameda, California, Midway began annual deployments bringing McDonnell F3H Demons, North American FJ-4 Furys, Vought F-8 Crusaders, Douglas A-1 Skyraiders, and Douglas A-3 Skywarriors to the 7th Fleet in 1958, and into the South China Sea during the Laotian Crisis of spring 1961. During the 1962 deployment, Midway recorded her 100,000th arrested landing as the ship's aircraft tested the air defense systems of Japan, Korea, Okinawa, the Philippines, and Taiwan. Midway again sailed for the Far East 6 March 1965, and from mid-April flew strikes against military and logistics installations in North and South Vietnam, including the first combat use of AGM-12 Bullpup air-to-surface missiles. On 17 June 1965 two VF-21 McDonnell Douglas F-4B Phantom IIs flying from Midway were credited with the first confirmed MiG kills of the Vietnam conflict, using AIM-7 Sparrow missiles to down two MiG-17Fs. Three days later, four of Midway's A-1 Skyraiders used the World War II vintage Thach Weave tactic to down an attacking MiG-17F. Midway lost an F-4 Phantom and two A-4 Skyhawks to North Vietnamese S-75 Dvina surface-to-air missiles.

Flight deck operations aboard USS Midway.

Midway returned to Alameda on 23 November to enter San Francisco Bay Naval Shipyard on 11 February 1966 for a massive modernization (SCB-101.66), which proved expensive and controversial. The flight deck was enlarged from 2.8 to 4 acres (11,000 to 16,000 m^{2}; 120,000 to 170,000 sq ft), and the angle of the flight deck landing area was increased to 13.5 degrees. The elevators were enlarged, moved, and given almost double the weight capacity. Midway also received new steam catapults, arresting gear, and a centralized air conditioning plant. Cost overruns raised the price of this program from $88 million to US$202 million, and precluded a similar modernization planned for Franklin D. Roosevelt. After Midway was finally recommissioned on 31 January 1970, it was found that the modifications had worsened the ship's seakeeping capabilities and ability to conduct air operations in rough seas, which made further modifications necessary to correct the problem.

=== Return to Vietnam ===
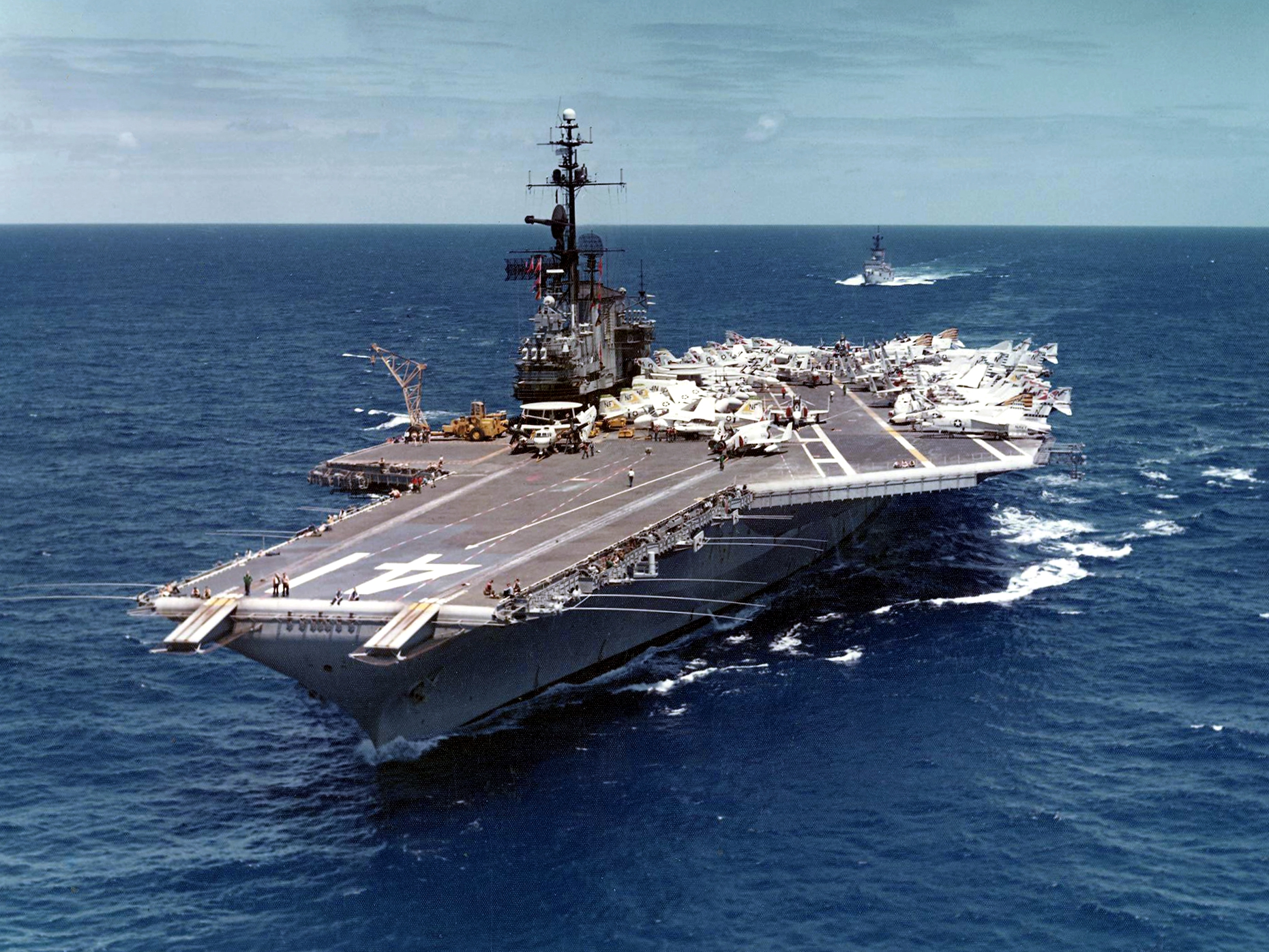
USS Midway underway in the Pacific Ocean on April 19, 1971

Midway returned to Vietnam and on 18 May 1971, after relieving Hancock at Yankee Station, began single carrier operations. Midway departed Yankee Station on 5 June, completing the vessel's final line period on 31 October 1971, and returned to the ship's homeport on 6 November 1971.

Midway, with embarked Carrier Air Wing 5 (CVW 5), again departed Alameda for operations off Vietnam on 10 April 1972. On 11 May, aircraft from Midway, along with those from Coral Sea, Kitty Hawk, and Constellation, began laying naval mines off North Vietnamese ports, including Thanh Hóa, Đồng Hới, Vinh, Hon Gai, Quang Khe, and Cam Pha, as well as other approaches to Haiphong. Ships that were in port in Haiphong had been warned that the mining would take place and that the mines would be armed 72 hours later.

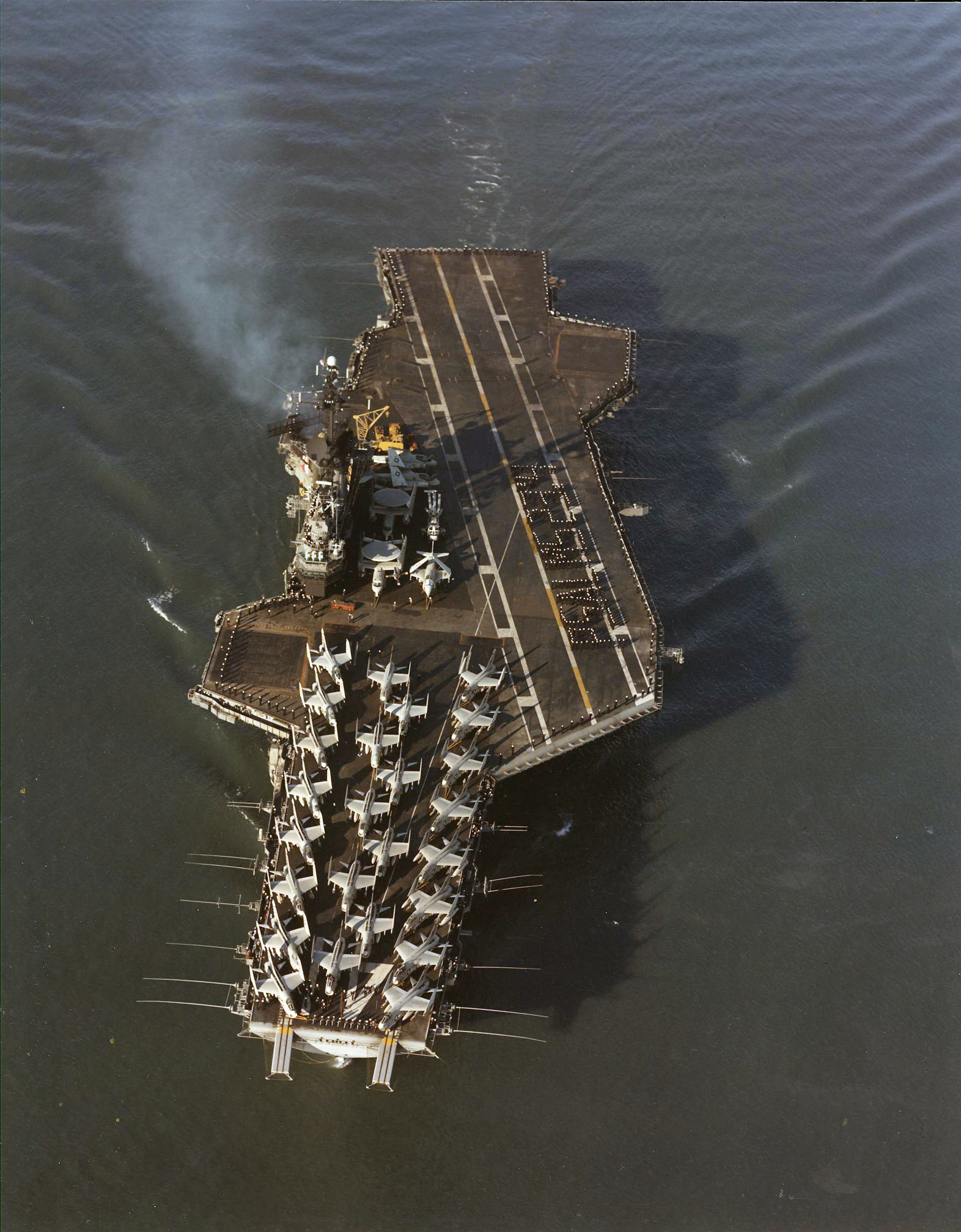
Midway en route to Southeast Asia in April 1972

Midway continued Vietnam operations during Operation Linebacker throughout the summer of 1972. On 7 August 1972, an HC-7 Det 110 helicopter, flying from Midway, and aided by planes from the carrier and from Saratoga, searched for the pilot of an A-7 Corsair II aircraft from Saratoga who had been downed the previous day by a surface-to-air missile about 20 mi (32 km) inland, northwest of Vinh. Flying over mountains, the HC-7 helicopter spotted the downed aviator with her searchlight and, under heavy ground fire, retrieved him before returning to an LPD off the coast. This was the deepest penetration by a rescue helicopter into North Vietnam since 1968. By the end of 1972, HC-7 Det 110 had rescued a total of 48 pilots, 35 in combat conditions.

On 5 October 1973, Midway, with CVW 5, put into Yokosuka, Japan, marking the first forward-deployment of a complete carrier task group in a Japanese port, the result of an accord arrived at on 31 August 1972 between the U.S. and Japan. The move allowed sailors to live with their families when in port; more strategically, it allowed three carriers to stay in East Asia even as the economic situation demanded the reduction of carriers in the fleet. CVW 5 became based at the nearby Naval Air Facility Atsugi.

For service in Vietnam from 30 April 1972, to 9 February 1973, Midway and CVW 5 received the Presidential Unit Citation from Richard Nixon. It read:

For extraordinary heroism and outstanding performance of duty in action against enemy forces in Southeast Asia from 30 April 1972 to 9 February 1973. During this crucial period of the Vietnam conflict, USS MIDWAY and embarked Attack Carrier Air Wing FIVE carried out devastating aerial attacks against enemy installations, transportation, and lines of communications in the face of extremely heavy opposition including multi-calibre antiaircraft artillery fire and surface-to-air missiles. Displaying superb airmanship and unwavering courage, MIDWAY/CVW-5 pilots played a significant role in lifting the prolonged sieges at An Lộc, Kon Tum, and Quảng Trị and in carrying out the concentrated aerial strikes against the enemy's industrial heartland which eventually resulted in a cease-fire. By their excellent teamwork, dedication, and sustained superior performance, the officers and men of MIDWAY and Attack Carrier Air Wing FIVE reflected great credit upon themselves and upheld the highest traditions of the United States Naval Service."

Aircraft from Midway made both the first MIG kills in the Vietnam War, and the last air-to-air victory of the war. On 17 June 1965, aviators of Midway's Attack Carrier Wing 2, VF-21, had downed the first two MiGs credited to US forces in Southeast Asia. On 12 January 1973 a combat aircraft from Midway made the last air-to-air victory of the Vietnam War.

=== Operation Frequent Wind ===
On 19 April 1975, after North Vietnam had overrun two-thirds of South Vietnam, Midway, along with Coral Sea, Hancock, Enterprise and Okinawa, were sent to the waters off South Vietnam. Ten days later, U.S. 7th Fleet forces carried out Operation Frequent Wind, the evacuation of Saigon. For this, Midway, which had offloaded half of the ship's regular combat air wing at NS Subic Bay, Philippines, steamed to Thailand and took aboard eight U.S. Air Force CH-53 from 21st Special Operations Squadron and two HH-53 helicopters from 40th Aerospace Rescue and Recovery Squadron. As Saigon fell to North Vietnamese forces, these helicopters transported hundreds of U.S. personnel and Vietnamese people to Midway and other U.S. ships in the South China Sea.

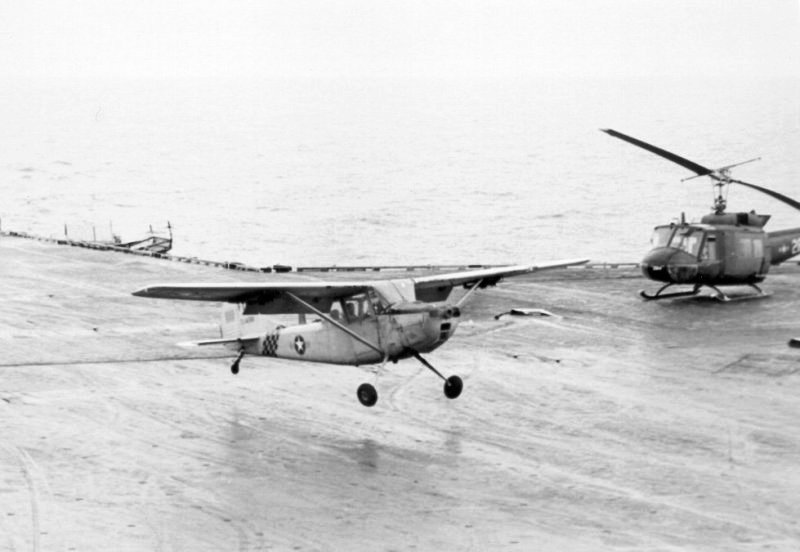
Major Buang's O-1 touching down

On 29 April 1975, Republic of Vietnam Air Force (RVNAF) Major Lý Bửng (also spelled Buang-Ly or Buang Lee) loaded his wife and five children into a two-seat Cessna O-1 Bird Dog and took off from Con Son Island. After evading enemy ground fire, Buang headed out to the South China Sea, found Midway, and began to circle overhead with his landing lights turned on. Midway's crew unsuccessfully attempted to contact the aircraft on emergency frequencies. When a spotter reported that there were at least four people in the two-seater aircraft, all thoughts of forcing the pilot to ditch alongside were abandoned. After three tries, Major Buang managed to drop a note from a low pass over the deck: "Can you move the helicopter to the other side, I can land on your runway, I can fly for one hour more, we have enough time to move. Please rescue me! Major Buang, wife and 5 child." Captain Larry Chambers, the ship's commanding officer, ordered that the arresting wires be removed and that any helicopters that could not be safely and quickly moved should be pushed over the side. He called for volunteers, and soon every available seaman was on deck to help. An estimated US$10 million worth of UH-1 Huey helicopters were pushed overboard. With a 500-foot (150 m) ceiling, 5-mile (8.0 km) visibility, light rain, and 15 knots (28 km/h; 17 mph) of surface wind, Chambers ordered the ship to sail at 25 knots (46 km/h; 29 mph) into the wind. Warnings about the dangerous downdrafts created behind a steaming carrier were transmitted blind in both Vietnamese and English. To make matters worse, five more UH-1s landed and cluttered up the deck. Without hesitation, Chambers ordered them jettisoned as well. Captain Chambers recalled that

[Buang's] aircraft cleared the ramp and touched down on center line at the normal touchdown point. Had he been equipped with a tailhook he could have bagged a number 3 wire. He bounced once and came to a stop abeam of the island, amid a wildly cheering, arms-waving flight deck crew.

Buang was escorted to the bridge where Chambers congratulated him on his outstanding airmanship, and his bravery in risking everything on a gamble beyond the point of no return without knowing for certain a carrier would be where he needed it. The crew of Midway was so impressed that they established a fund to help him and his family get settled in the United States. The O-1 that Major Buang landed is now on display at the Naval Aviation Museum in Pensacola, Florida. Major Buang became the first Vietnamese pilot ever to land a fixed-wing aircraft on an aircraft carrier deck.

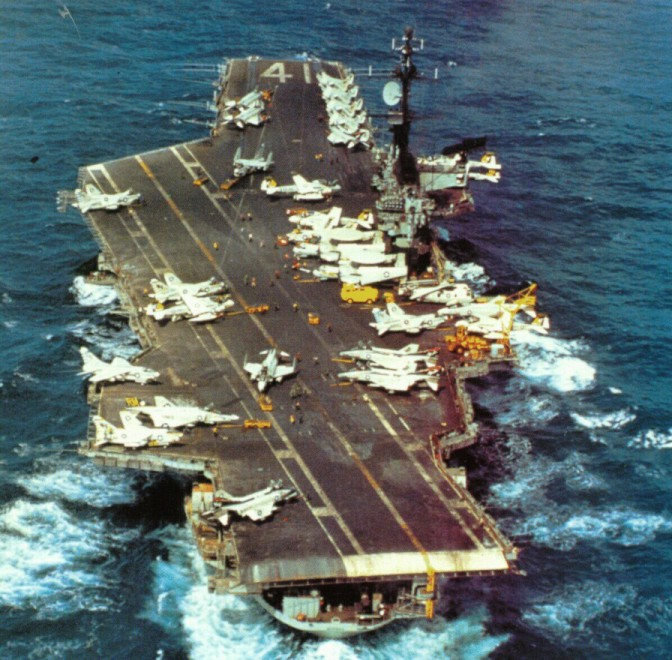
USS Midway (CVA-41) in the Pacific, 1974

Upon completion of ferrying people to other ships, Midway returned to Thailand and disembarked the Air Force helicopters at U-Tapao Royal Thai Navy Airfield. The CH-53s then airlifted over 50 RVNAF aircraft to the ship. With almost 100 helicopters and aircraft of the former RVNAF aboard, the ship steamed to Guam where the aircraft and helicopters were offloaded in twenty-four hours. While transiting back to the Philippines to pick up the ship's air wing, Midway was rerouted to act as a floating airfield in support of special operation forces rescuing the SS Mayagüez. Midway picked up the ship's regular air wing again a month later when the aircraft carrier returned NAS Cubi Point, Philippines.

On 30 June 1975, Midway was redesignated from "CVA-41" to "CV-41".

=== After Vietnam ===
On 21 August 1976, a Navy task force headed by Midway made a show of force off the coast of Korea in reaction to an attack on two U.S. Army officers who were killed by North Korean soldiers on 18 August when they attempted to cut down a tree. The U.S. response to this incident was given the name Operation Paul Bunyan. Midway's participation was part of a U.S. demonstration of military concern vis-à-vis North Korea.

Midway relieved Constellation as the Indian Ocean contingency carrier on 16 April 1979. This unscheduled deployment was due to USS Ranger colliding with the tanker Liberian Fortune near the Straits of Malacca, with Midway taking over Ranger's mission while she went in for repairs. Midway and her escorts continued a significant American naval presence in the oil-producing region of the Arabian Sea and Persian Gulf. On 18 November, the aircraft carrier steamed to the North Arabian Sea in connection with the continuing hostage crisis in Iran. Militant followers of the Ayatollah Khomeini, who had come to power following the overthrow of the Shah, seized the U.S. embassy in Tehran on 4 November and held 63 US citizens hostage. On 21 November Kitty Hawk arrived, and both carriers, along with their escort ships, were joined by Nimitz and her escorts on 22 January 1980. Midway was relieved by Coral Sea on 5 February.

=== Missions in the 1980s ===
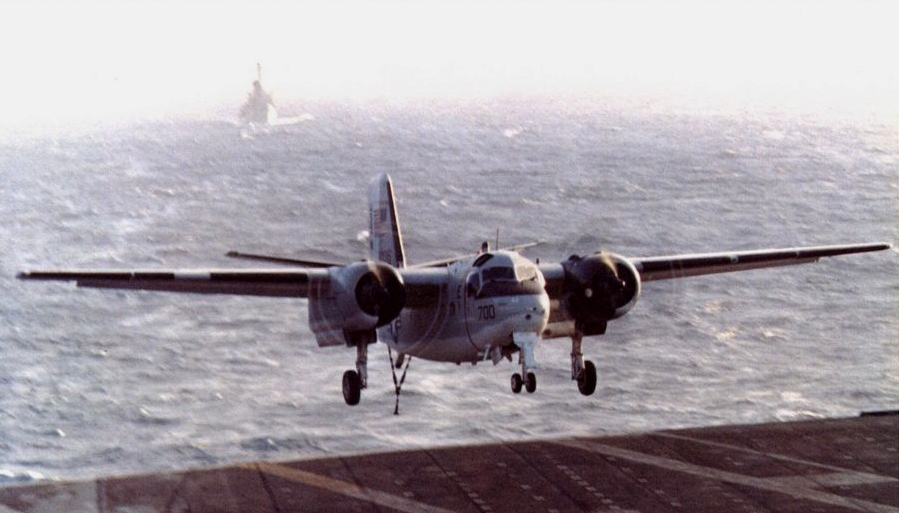
C-1 Trader lands on USS Midway, 1982

Following a period in Yokosuka, Midway relieved Coral Sea 30 May 1980 on standby south of Jeju-Do Island in the Sea of Japan following the potential of civil unrest in the Republic of Korea.

While transiting the passage between Palawan Island of the Philippines and the coast of Northern Borneo on 29 July, the Panamanian merchant ship Cactus collided with Midway. Cactus was 450 nautical miles (830 km) southwest of Subic Bay and heading to Singapore when she struck near the carrier's liquid oxygen plant; two sailors working in the plant were killed and three were injured. Midway sustained light damage and three F-4 Phantom aircraft parked on the flight deck also were damaged.

On 17 August, Midway relieved Constellation to begin another Indian Ocean deployment and to complement the Dwight D. Eisenhower task group still on contingency duty in the Arabian Sea. Midway spent a total of 118 consecutive days in the Indian Ocean during 1980. On November 6, 1980, USS Ranger (CV-60) and her task group relieved "Midway" <NAVAL HELICOPTER HISTORY TIMELINE 1980> and Midway returned to Naval Base Subic Bay.

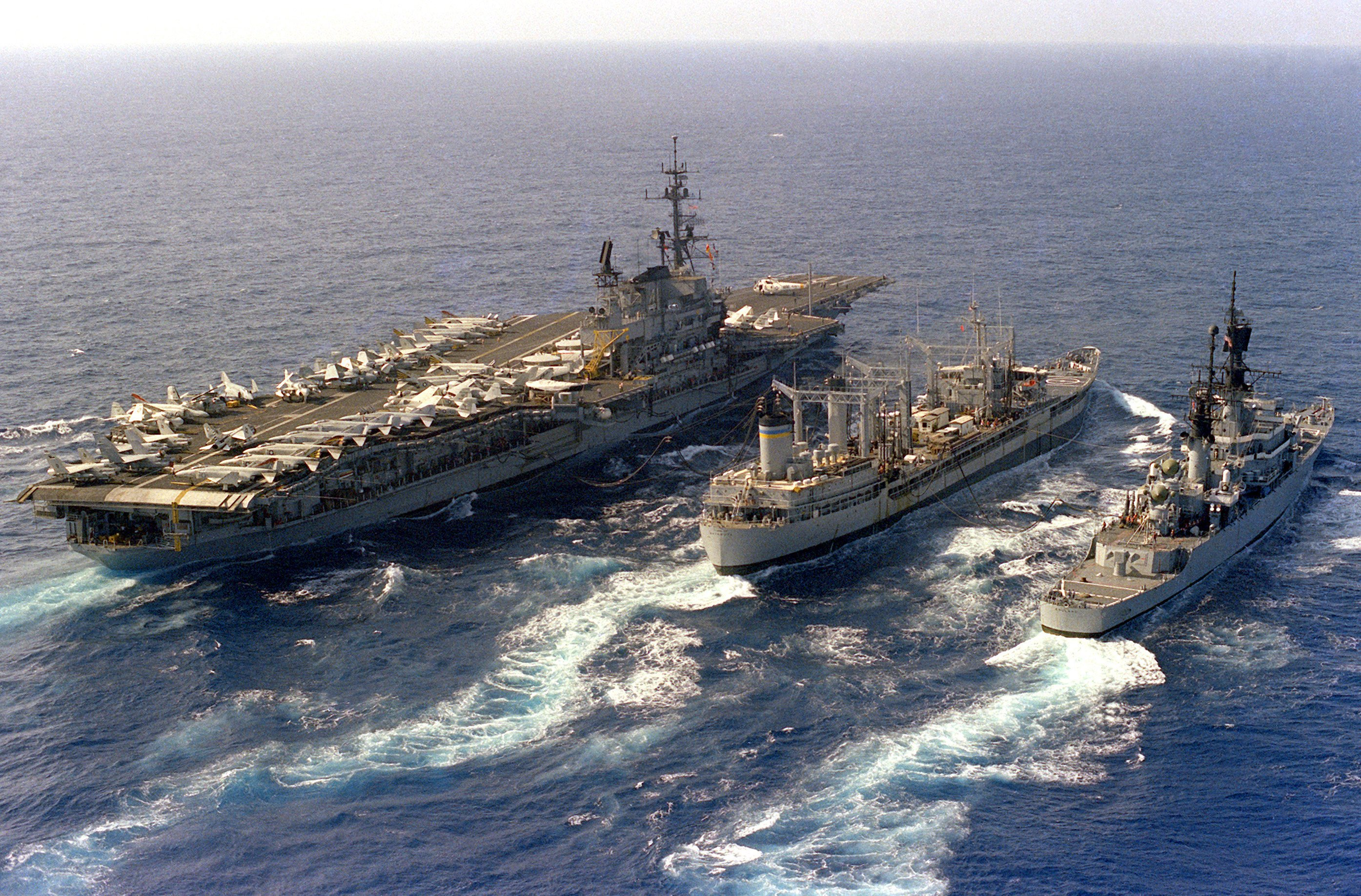
USNS Navasota (T-AO-106) refuels USS Midway (CV-41) and USS England (CG-22) on 7 December 1983

On 16 March 1981, an A-6E Intruder from VA-115 aboard Midway sighted a downed civilian helicopter in the South China Sea. Midway immediately dispatched HC-1 Det 2 helicopters to the scene. All 17 people aboard the downed helicopter were rescued and brought aboard the carrier. The chartered civilian helicopter was also retrieved from the water and lifted to Midway's flight deck.

On 25 March 1986, the final carrier launching of a Navy fleet F-4S Phantom II took place off Midway during flight operations in the East China Sea. ABF2 Paul F. Morehead Jr., fueled aircraft number 111 for the last time. The Phantoms were replaced by the new F/A-18A Hornets.

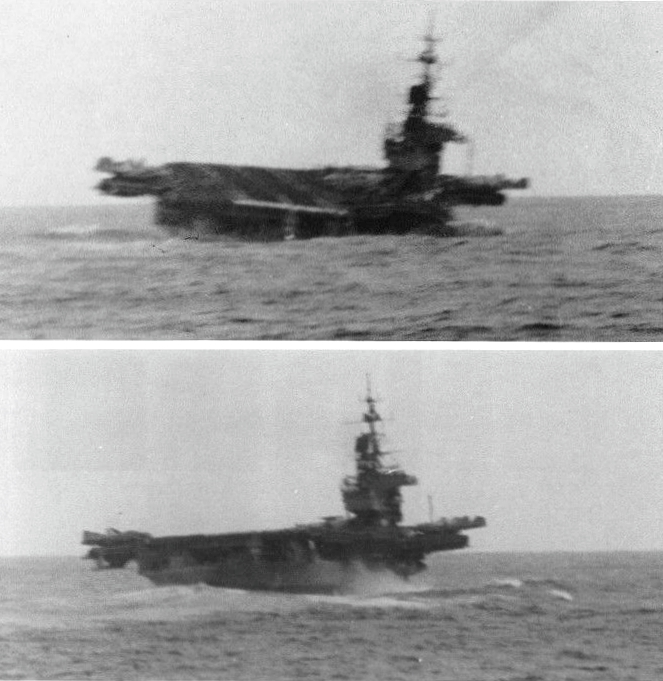
"Rock'n Roll carrier": Midway heavily rolling after her 1986 refit

Midway continued serving in the western Pacific throughout the 1980s. In order to alleviate persistent seakeeping issues, Midway received hull blisters in 1986. During her 1986 refit (named "Extended Incremental Selected Repair Availability"), blisters were added to improve the ship's stability. The modification proved counterproductive, as it actually increased the ship's instability in rough seas. She took water over the flight deck during excessive rolls in moderate seas, thereby hampering flight operations. Before another $138 million refit was approved to rectify the stability problems, it was even proposed to decommission Midway. Nevertheless, she had earned herself the nickname "Rock'n Roll carrier." During a typhoon while in the Sea of Japan during the Olympic Games in Seoul, Korea, on 8 October 1988, Midway, which was not supposed to be able to sustain more than 24 degrees of roll, survived a 26-degree roll.

On 30 October 1989, an F/A-18A Hornet aircraft from Midway mistakenly dropped a 500-pound (227-kilogram) general-purpose bomb on the deck of Reeves during training exercises in the Indian Ocean, creating a 5-foot (1.5 m) hole in the bow, sparking small fires, and injuring five sailors. Reeves was 32 miles (51 km) south of Diego Garcia at the time of the incident.

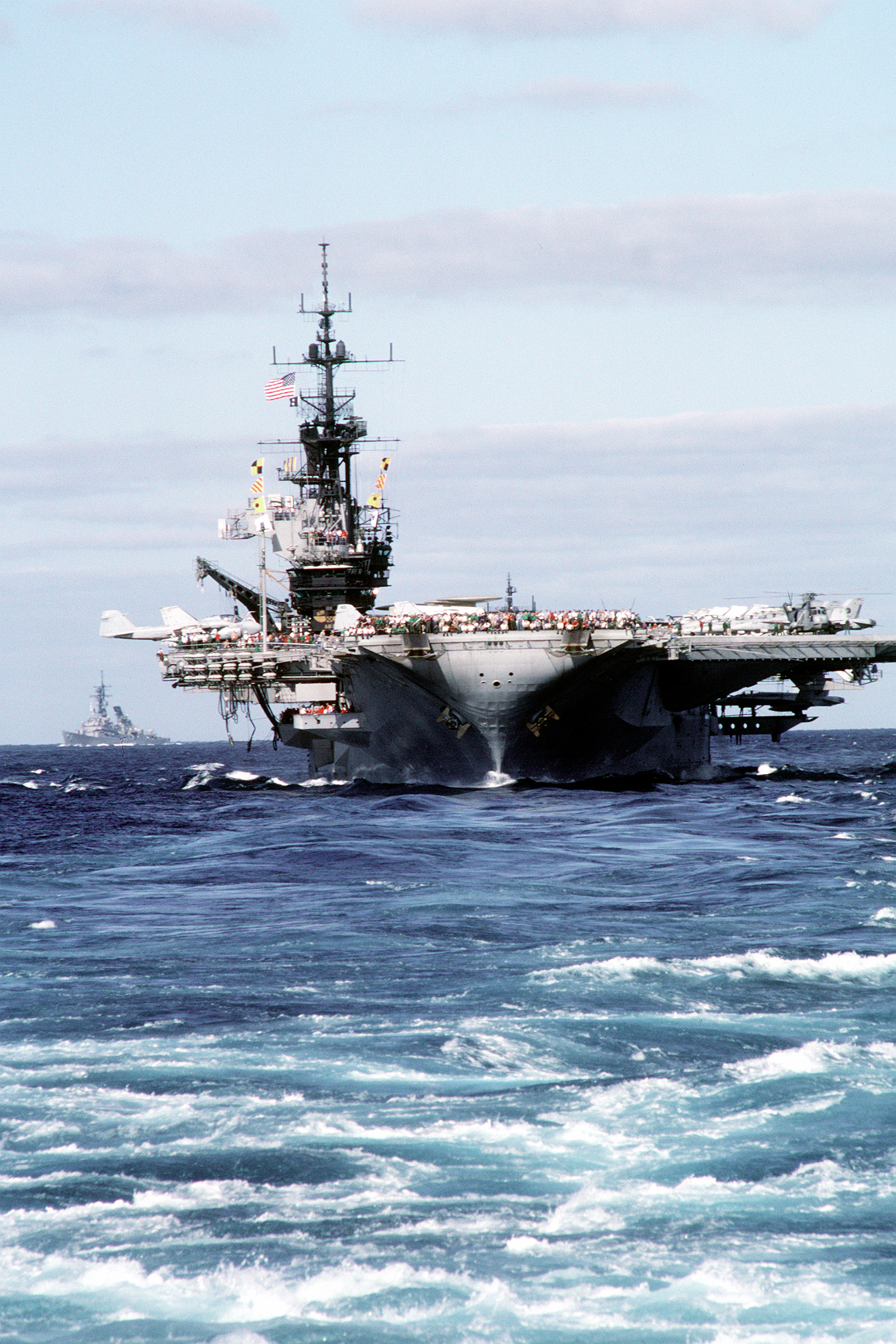
USS Midway underway in Dec. 1987

Tragedy struck Midway on 20 June 1990. While conducting routine flight operations approximately 125 nautical miles (232 km; 144 mi) northeast of Japan, the ship was badly damaged by two onboard explosions. These explosions led to a fire that raged more than ten hours. In addition to damage to the ship's hull, two crew members were killed and nine others were wounded; one of the injured later died of his injuries. All 11 crewmen belonged to the at sea fire-fighting team known as the Flying Squad. When Midway entered Yokosuka Harbor the next day, 12 Japanese media helicopters flew in circles and hovered about 150 feet (46 m) above the flight deck. Three bus loads of reporters were waiting on the pier. About 30 minutes after Midway cast her first line, more than 100 international print and electronic journalists charged over the brow to cover the event. The news media made a major issue out of the incident, as it had happened amid several other military accidents. It was thought that the accident would lead to the ship's immediate retirement due to her age, but Midway was retained to fight in one last major conflict.

=== Operation Desert Storm ===
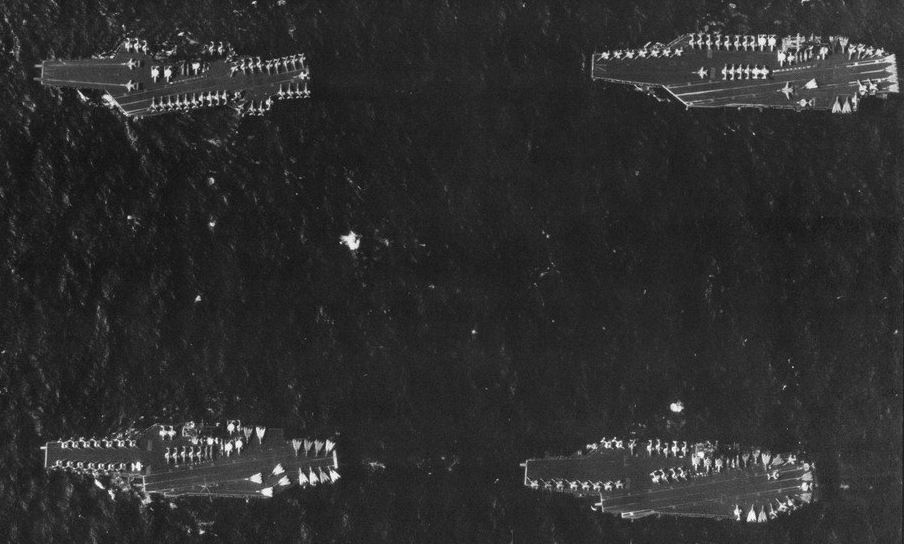
Four US Navy carriers form "Battle Force Zulu" following the 1991 Gulf War; Midway (top left) cruises with Ranger (bottom left), Theodore Roosevelt (top right) and America (bottom right)

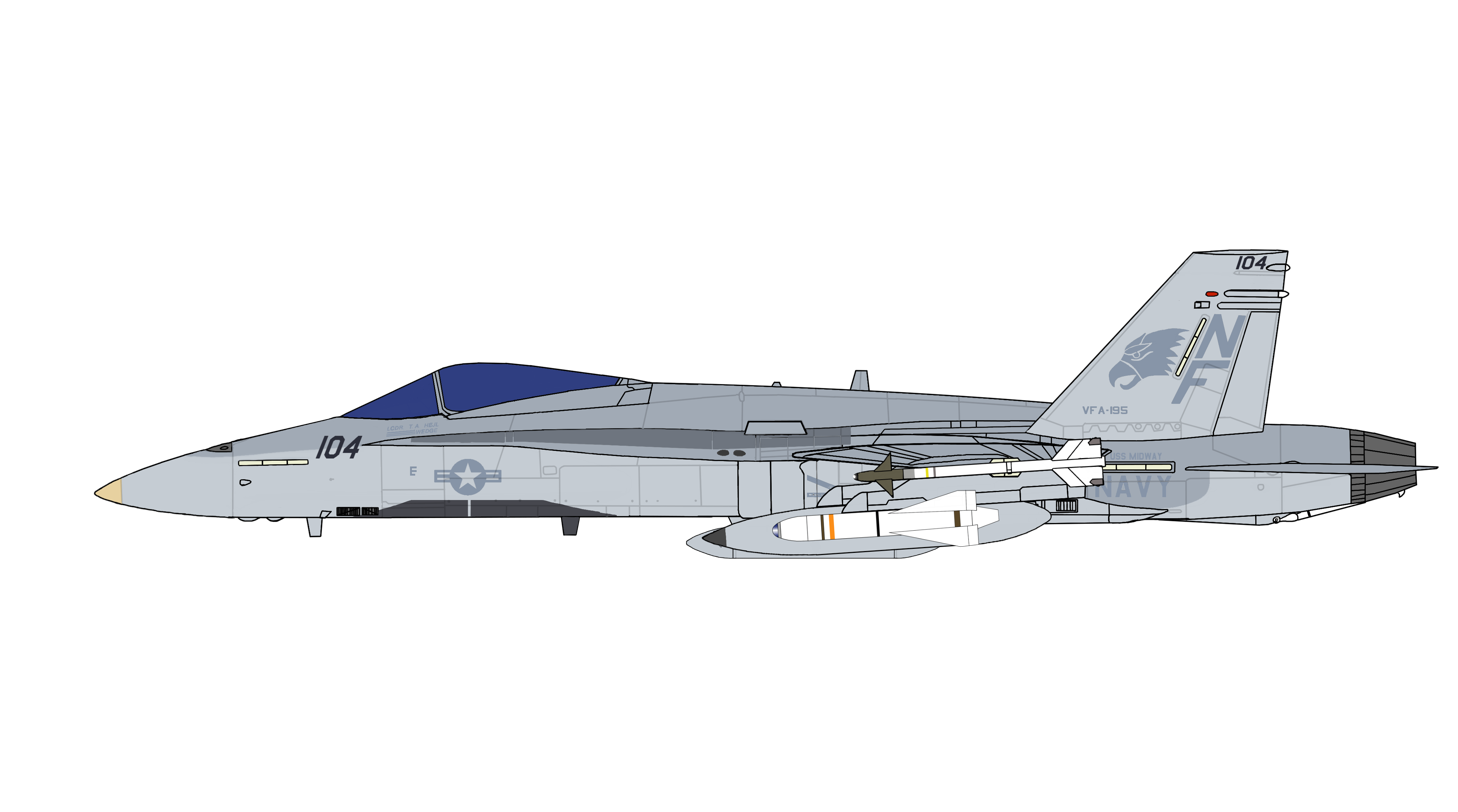
NF-104, an F/A-18A Hornet from VFA-195 as it appeared on 13 February 1991 when it destroyed an Iraqi Super Frelon helicopter with a Walleye I

On 2 August 1990, Iraq invaded neighboring Kuwait, and U.S. forces moved into Saudi Arabia as part of Operation Desert Shield to protect that country against invasion by Iraq. On 1 November 1990, Midway was again on station in the North Arabian Sea as the carrier of Battle Force Zulu (which included warships from the U.S., Australia, and other countries), relieving Independence. On 15 November, the carrier participated in Operation Imminent Thunder, an eight-day combined amphibious landing exercise in northeastern Saudi Arabia which involved about 1,000 U.S. Marines, 16 warships, and more than 1,100 aircraft. Meanwhile, the United Nations set an ultimatum deadline of 15 January 1991 for Iraq to withdraw from Kuwait.

Operation Desert Storm began the next day. On January 17, 1991, at 2:00AM, Midway launched aircraft from CVW-5 for the first carrier strikes of the Gulf War. An A-6E TRAM Intruder from VA-185 Nighthawks from Midway was the first carrier aircraft over the coast. Around 17 other aircraft from Midway provided support during the strikes.

At around 4:05AM, four A-6E TRAM Intruders from VA-185 and VA-115 Eagles attacked Shaibah Air Base at around 350 ft, encountering heavy AAA fire, with two of the four aircraft not dropping their bombs. At around the same time, three A-6E TRAM Intruders from VA-115, each loaded with six Mk.83 bombs; attacked Ahmad Al-Jaber Air Base in occupied Kuwait. The AAA fire at Shaibah led to Midway's pilots avoiding low-level attacks for the rest of the war. No Midway aircraft were lost on the strikes. The Navy launched 228 sorties that day from Midway and Ranger in the Persian Gulf, and from John F. Kennedy and Saratoga in the Red Sea. The Navy also launched more than 100 Tomahawk missiles from nine ships in the Mediterranean Sea, the Red Sea, and the Persian Gulf.

Midway later launched an F/A-18 Hornet that used the first AGM-62 Walleye television-guided glide bomb in combat. The Hornet from VFA-195 destroyed a T-shaped building at Umm Qasr Naval Base with a Walleye II. The pilot, LCDR Jeffery Ashby, led a mission on 13 February 1991 that successfully destroyed an Iraqi Super Frelon helicopter armed with Exocet missiles (which had posed a threat to the US Carriers) with a Walleye I. The removal of the threat allowed Midway and the other carriers Ranger and Theodore Roosevelt to move closer to Kuwait. NF-104 was painted with a kill marking for the helicopter and was displayed when Midway returned to Japan. Some of Midway's F/A-18As also unsuccessfully attempted to intercept Iraqi Mirage F1s during the Attack on Ras Tanura on January 24, with an RSAF F-15C later shooting down both of the Mirages.

Desert Storm officially ended 28 February, and Midway departed the Persian Gulf on 11 March 1991 and returned to Yokosuka.

=== Rest of 1991 ===
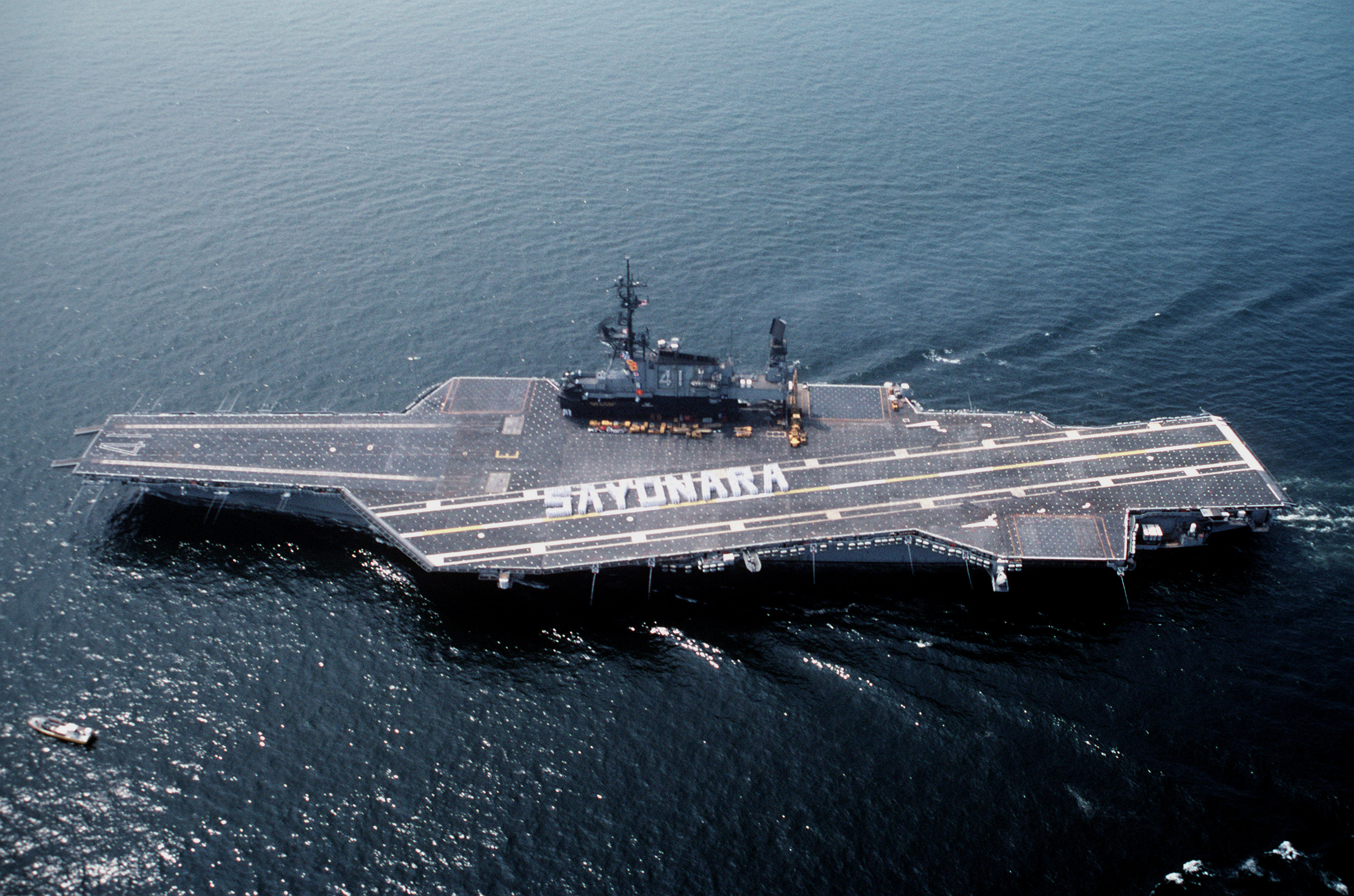
Midway departing Yokosuka for the last time in August 1991

In June 1991, Midway left for her final deployment, this time to the Philippines to take part in Operation Fiery Vigil, which was the evacuation of 20,000 military members and their families from Clark Air Base, on the island of Luzon, after the eruption of Mount Pinatubo. Midway, along with twenty other U.S. naval ships, ferried the evacuees to the island of Cebu, where they were taken off the ship by helicopter. After taking part in the evacuation, the aircraft carrier once again returned to Yokosuka.

=== Final cruise ===
In August 1991, Midway departed Yokosuka for the last time and returned to Pearl Harbor. There, she turned over with Independence, which replaced Midway as the forward-deployed carrier in Yokosuka. Rear Admiral Joseph Prueher and the staff of Carrier Group ONE moved to Independence. Prueher was the last admiral to lower his flag on Midway. She then sailed to Seattle for a port visit. There the ship disembarked "tigers" (guests of crew members) before making her final voyage to San Diego.

== As museum ship ==
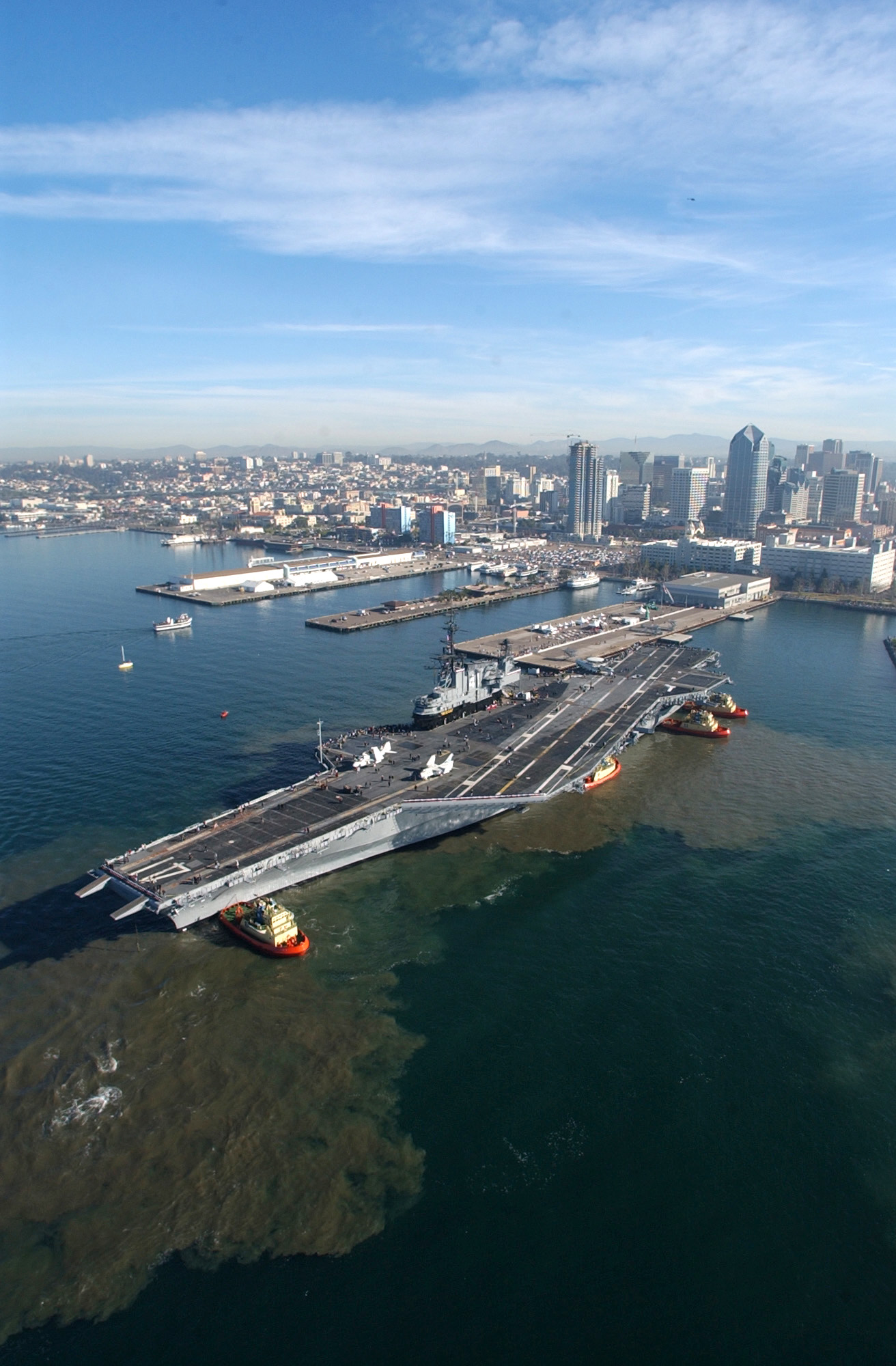
10 January 2004, ex-Midway prepares to moor at Navy Pier in San Diego

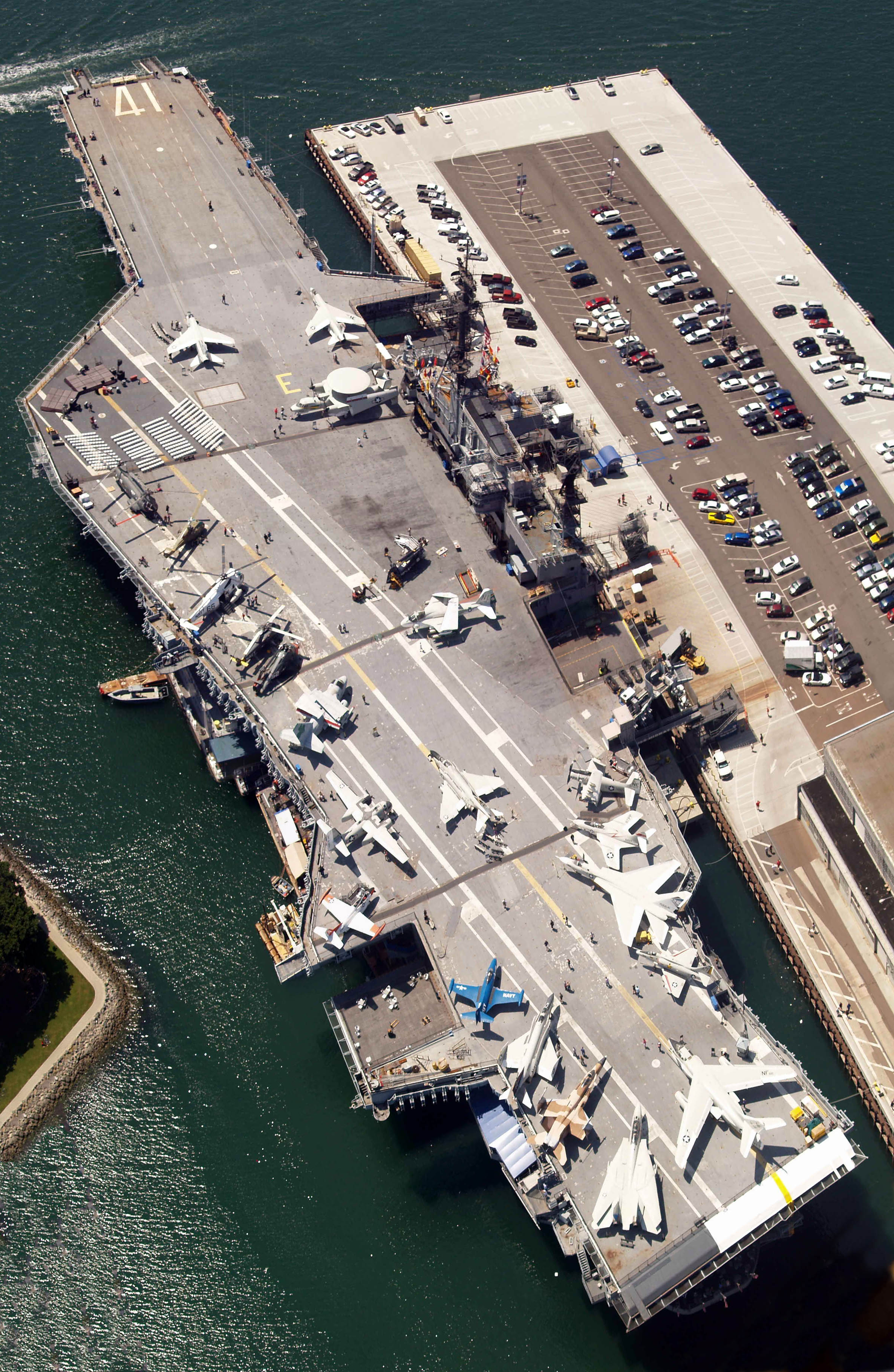
Aerial view of the USS Midway Museum in 2011

External videos
- 3D Walkthrough of USS Midway, Virtual Tour

Midway was decommissioned at Naval Air Station North Island on 11 April 1992 in a ceremony in which the main speaker was Secretary of Defense Dick Cheney. Lieutenant George H. Gay Jr., the sole surviving pilot of Torpedo Squadron 8 (VT-8) from the Battle of Midway, was an honored guest at the decommissioning ceremony. During decommissioning, Midway, her sailors, and their families were filmed for the movie At Sea, a documentary on carrier life shown only at the Navy Museum in Washington, D.C. The ship was stricken from the Naval Vessel Register on 17 March 1997.

On 30 September 2003, ex-Midway began her journey from the Navy Inactive Ship Maintenance Facility, Bremerton, Washington, to San Diego, California, in preparation for use as a museum and memorial. The aircraft carrier was docked in early October at the Charles P. Howard Terminal in Oakland, California, while work proceeded on the Navy Pier in downtown San Diego. On 10 January 2004, the ship was moored at her final location, where she was opened to the public on 7 June 2004 as a museum. In the first year of operation, the museum had 879,281 visitors, double the expected attendance.

On 11 November 2012, a college basketball game between the Syracuse Orange and the San Diego State Aztecs was played on the flight deck. The Orange won, 62–49.

On 15 July 2015, museum personnel were evacuated from ex-Midway due to smoke caused by an apparent fire. The San Diego fire department responded quickly, but no fire was found, and the museum was able to open for the day on schedule.

On 18 July 2025, a private 60 feet (18 m) sportfishing boat collided with Midway at slow speed. There were no injuries, or significant damage, and the captain of the vessel was later arrested on suspicion of boating while under the influence.

== Awards and decorations ==

Presidential Unit Citation	Joint Meritorious Unit Award	Navy Unit Commendation with three stars	Meritorious Unit Commendation with two stars
Navy E Ribbon with wreathed Battle "E" device	Navy Expeditionary Medal with three stars	China Service Medal	American Campaign Medal
World War II Victory Medal	Navy Occupation Service Medal	National Defense Service Medal with two stars	Armed Forces Expeditionary Medal with six stars
Vietnam Service Medal with four stars	Southwest Asia Service Medal with two stars	Humanitarian Service Medal	Sea Service Deployment Ribbon with sixteen stars
Republic of Vietnam Meritorious; Unit Citation (Gallantry Cross)	Republic of Vietnam Campaign; Medal	Kuwait Liberation Medal (Saudi Arabia)	Kuwait Liberation Medal (Kuwait)

== See also ==
- List of aircraft carriers
- List of aircraft carriers of the United States Navy
