= Trần Quốc Tảng =

- Prince Hưng Nhượng
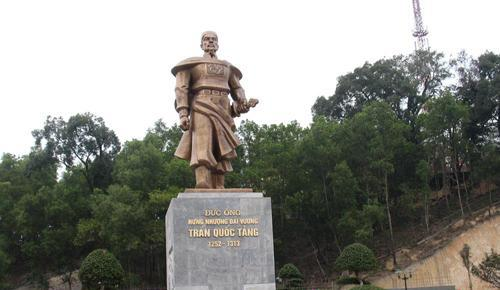
- Bronze statue of Trần Quốc Tảng
- Born: 1252; Yên Sinh, Đại Việt
- Died: 1313 (aged 60–61); An Bang, Đại Việt
- Issue: Empress Thuận Thánh Bảo Từ; Prince Văn Huệ Trần Quốc Triều
- House: Trần dynasty
- Father: Trần Hưng Đạo
- Mother: Princess Thiên Thành

Trần Quốc Tảng (chữ Hán: 陳 國 顙; 1252–1313) was the third son of Trần Hưng Đạo. He was a general of the Trần dynasty during the reign of emperors Trần Nhân Tông and Trần Anh Tông who was also his son-in-law. As a member of Yên Sinh's line in Trần clan, Trần Quốc Tảng supported the plot of taking over the throne from Trần Cảnh's line which was opposed by his father Trần Quốc Tuấn and his elder brother Trần Quốc Nghiễn, this difference made Hưng Đạo break off the paternal relation with Trần Quốc Tảng until his death in 1300.

== History ==
Trần Quốc Tảng was born as Prince Hưng Nhượng (興 讓 王, Vietnamese: Hưng Nhượng vương) in Yên Sinh fief (now Đông Triều District, Quảng Ninh) as the third son of Trần Hưng Đạo, leader of Yên Sinh's line in Trần clan. After the 1237 event in which Trần Liễu, Trần Quốc Tuấn's father, was forced by grand chancellor Trần Thủ Độ, to give up his pregnant wife Thuận Thiên to his younger brother Trần Cảnh, an inherited hatred began to take form between the Yên Sinh's line of Trần Liễu including Trần Quốc Tuấn and Trần Cảnh's line including the emperors Thánh Tông and Nhân Tông. Before his death, Trần Liễu made his son Trần Hưng Đạo promise to revenge for him by taking over the throne but due to the situation of Đại Việt when the Trần dynasty had to face with three consecutive invasions from the Yuan dynasty, Trần Quốc Tuấn preferred keeping a harmony between him and Trần Quang Khải who was the other commander of Đại Việt's army and also a member of Trần Cảnh's line.

After being the commander in chief of Đại Việt's army with a supreme power in royal court, Trần Quốc Tuấn began to reflect on his father's last will and thus seek advice from his servants and surbodinates. The idea of taking over the throne was immediately opposed by Trần Quốc Tuấn's two most-trusted servants, Yết Kiêu and Dã Tượng, so did his eldest son Trần Hưng Vũ. While their opinions made Trần Hưng Đạo satisfied, his third son Trần Quốc Tảng, on the contrary, proved to support the plot in suggesting his father the story of Emperor Taizu of Song who founded the Song dynasty by taking over the throne from Later Zhou. Trần Quốc Tuấn was so angry after hearing his son's response that he even wanted to kill Trần Quốc Tảng but was stopped by Trần Hưng Vũ. Afterwards, Trần Hưng Đạo Trần Quốc Tuấn decided to break off the paternal relation with his son.

Besides the clash with his father, Trần Quốc Tảng's life was rarely mentioned in Đại Việt sử kí toàn thư, the most comprehensive historical account about dynastic eras of Vietnam. It was said that the general Trần Quốc Tảng fought with his brothers under the command of Trần Quốc Tuấn during the second Mongol invasion of Đại Việt and was promoted to governor (tiết độ sứ) after the war. Together with Trần Chiêu Minh, he did participated in a military campaign in 1297 with the purpose of putting down a revolt rose in the mountainous region. Trần Quốc Tảng was also one of the first mandarins in royal court realized the bad character of Trần Khắc Chung after his trip to Champa with the purpose of saving Princess Huyền Trân from the death.

Trần Quốc Tảng deceased in March 1313, he was posthumously entitled as prime minister (thái úy) of the royal court.

== Family ==
In February 1291, Trần Quốc Tảng's daughter was married to crown prince Trần Thuyên and eventually became the Empress Thuận Thánh Bảo Từ, empress and later empress mother of the Trần dynasty. He had another child, Trần Quốc Triều, who also held an important position in royal court.

== Legacy ==
Sometimes Trần Quốc Tảng was mistaken with his uncle, Master Tuệ Trung, who was elder brother of Trần Hưng Đạo, this confusion came from the collection Hoàng Việt văn tuyển of Bùi Huy Bích. Nowadays, Trần Quốc Tảng was still worshipped as a deity at Cửa Ông Temple (Cẩm Phả District, Quảng Ninh) near his native land and at a temple in Lạng Sơn, every year a traditional festival is held in Cửa Ông to commemorate the feats of Trần Quốc Tảng.
