= Lawrence Chambers =

American naval officer (born 1929)

Lawrence Cleveland Chambers
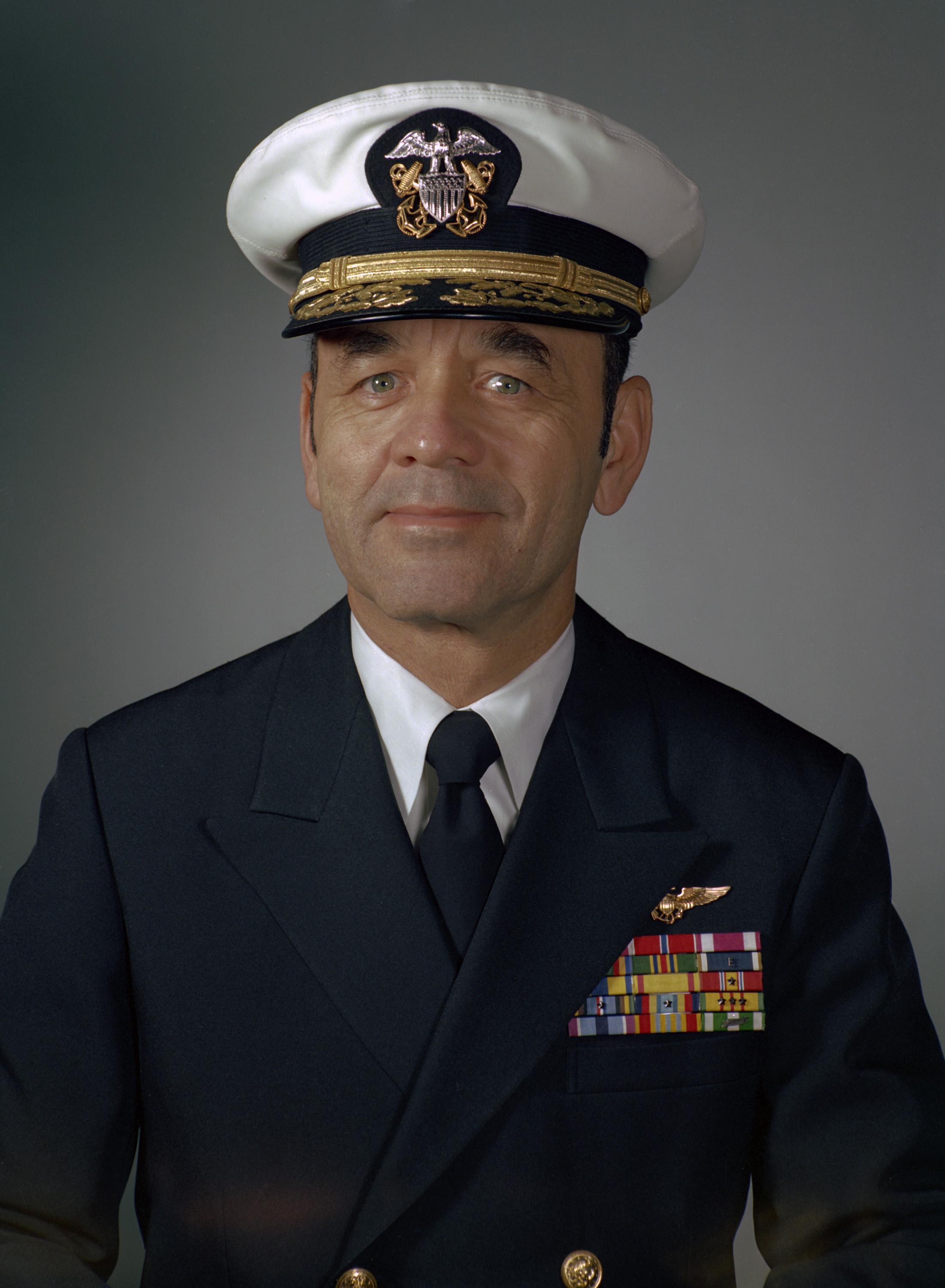
- Rear Adm. Chambers (1982; age 53)
- Born: June 10, 1929 (age 97); Bedford, Virginia, U.S.
- Military career
- Allegiance: United States
- Branch: United States Navy
- Service years: 1952–1984
- Rank: Rear admiral
- Nickname: "Larry"
- Commands: USS Midway (CV-41); USS Coral Sea (CV-43); Carrier Strike Group Three
- Conflicts: Vietnam War
- Awards: Bronze Star Medal; Vietnam Service Medal; Meritorious Service Medal
- Website: https://www.midway.org/blog/admiral-lawrence-chambers-the-pathfinder

Lawrence Cleveland "Larry" Chambers (born June 10, 1929) is the first African American to command a U.S. Navy aircraft carrier and the first African-American graduate of the Naval Academy to reach flag rank. While in command of USS Midway during Operation Frequent Wind, Chambers gave the controversial order to push overboard millions of dollars' worth of UH-1 Huey helicopters so Republic of Vietnam Air Force Major Buang-Ly could land on the aircraft carrier in a Cessna O-1 Bird Dog with his wife and five children, thereby saving their lives.

== Early life and education ==
In 1929, Chambers was born in Bedford, Virginia, United States. He was the third of five children raised by his mother, Charlotte Chambers. One of his brothers, Andrew, later became a lieutenant general in the U.S. Army.

After Chambers' father died, his mother began working in the War Department (which oversaw the United States Army) to support the family.

Chambers participated in Junior ROTC while attending Dunbar High School in Washington, D.C. After graduating as class valedictorian and commander of the corps of cadets, Chambers considered using the college/university level senior ROTC program to also pay for college. However, Wesley A. Brown, the first African American graduate of the U.S. Naval Academy, encouraged him to apply there. Chambers did and became the second African American to graduate from the Naval Academy on June 6, 1952.

Chambers has spoken of having mixed feelings about his time at the Naval Academy, to which he did not return to visit for twenty years:

"While I had some good memories, I also had some tough memories."

== Career ==
In 1954, after 18 months of flight training, Chambers was designated as a Naval Aviator. His first fleet assignment was to an air-antisubmarine warfare squadron, VS-37, where he flew the Grumman AF Guardian. Transitioning to the light attack community, he flew the A-1 Skyraider with VA-215 and then, following postgraduate education, transitioned to jet light attack aircraft, flying the A-4 Skyhawk with VA-125 and VA-22. He then established VA-67 (later VA-15) as its first commanding officer, flying the A-7 Corsair II.

From 1968 to 1971, Chambers flew combat missions over Vietnam from the aircraft carriers USS Ranger and USS Oriskany. In 1972 he was promoted to captain and placed in command of USS White Plains, a combat stores ship.

In January 1975, Chambers became the first African American to command an aircraft carrier, USS Midway, serving as the ship's commanding officer until December 1976. After being promoted to rear admiral, Chambers served as commander of Carrier Strike Group Three and as interim commander of Carrier Strike Group Four. He finished his career as vice commander of the Naval Air Systems Command.

=== Operation Frequent Wind ===
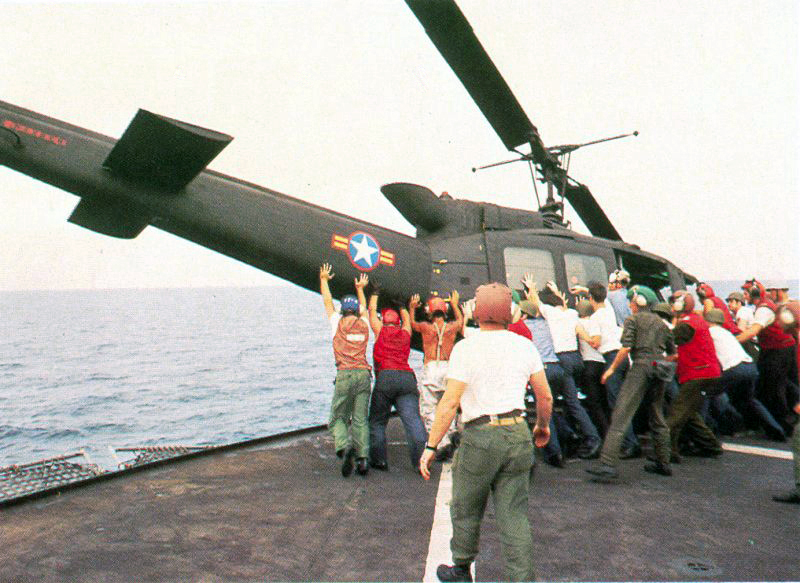
A South Vietnamese Air Force UH-1H is pushed overboard to make room for Major Buang to land his Cessna O-1.

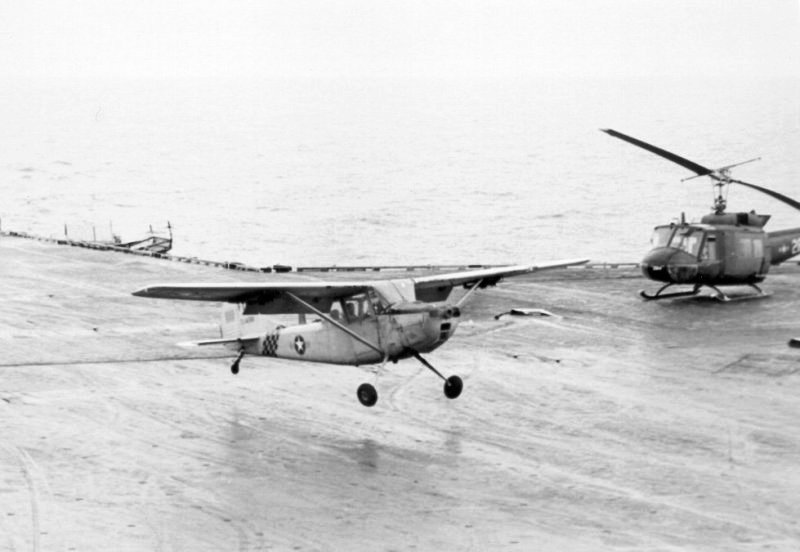
Major Buang's O-1 touching down.

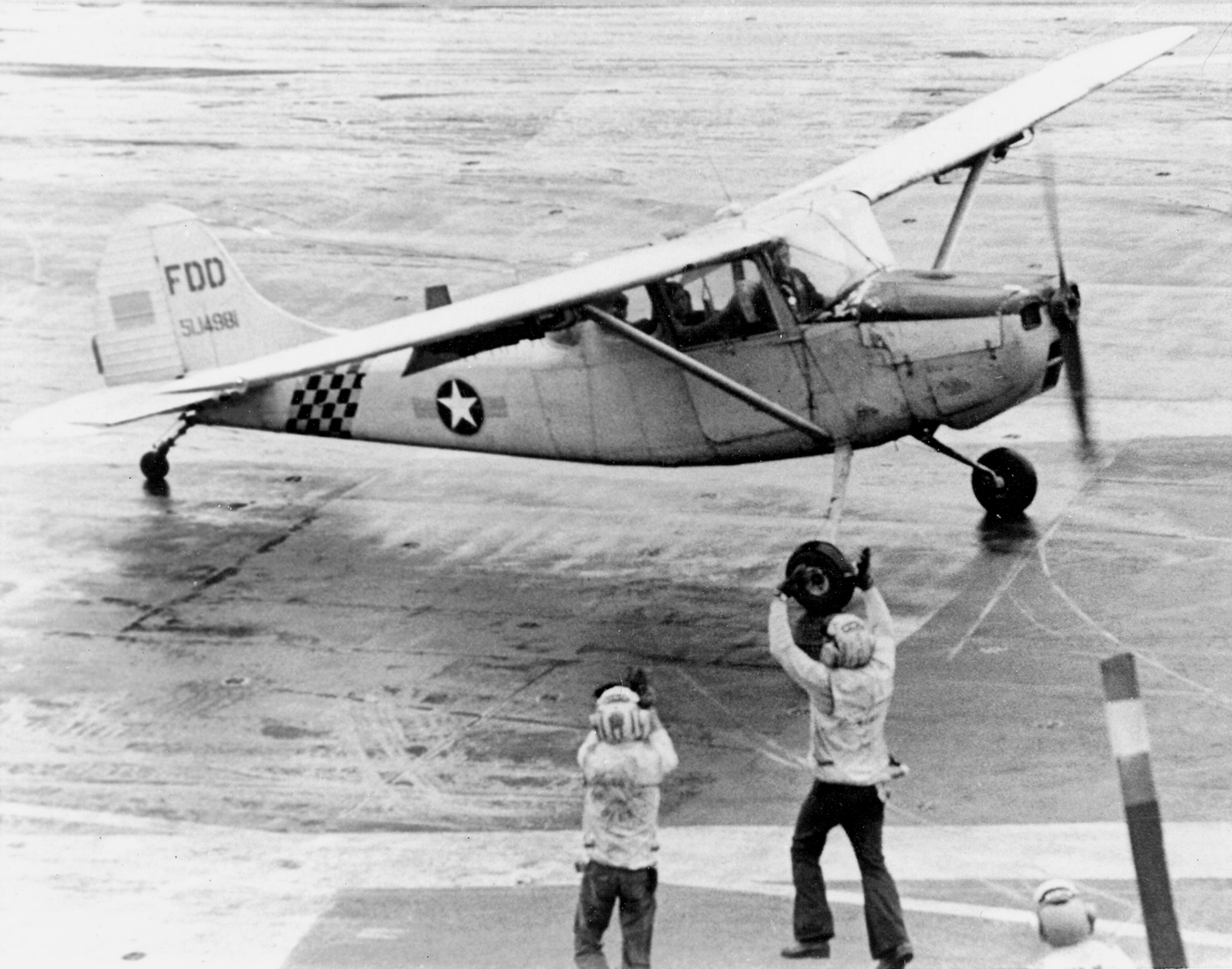
Major Buang's O-1 after landing aboard Midway during Operation Frequent Wind.

In April 1975, while in command of the aircraft carrier Midway, Chambers was ordered to "make best speed" to the waters off South Vietnam, as North Vietnam overran the country, to take part in Operation Frequent Wind, the evacuation of U.S. and South Vietnamese personnel. At the time the carrier was in Subic Bay Naval Base with the engineering plant partially torn apart.

Chambers has stated that he received no official order to start the operation, which began on April 29. Instead, when Nguyễn Cao Kỳ, the Vice President of South Vietnam, landed on the flight deck, Chambers figured the operation was underway. Soon the carrier's flight deck was full of helicopters carrying refugees from the fall of South Vietnam.

On that same day, South Vietnamese air force Major Buang-Ly loaded his wife and five children into a two-seat Cessna O-1 Bird Dog and took off from Con Son Island. After evading enemy ground fire, Major Buang headed out to sea and spotted Midway. Midway's crew attempted to contact the aircraft on emergency frequencies but the pilot continued to circle overhead with his landing lights turned on. When a spotter reported that there were at least four people in the two-place aircraft, all thoughts of forcing the pilot to ditch alongside were abandoned—it was unlikely the passengers of the overloaded Bird Dog could survive the ditching and safely escape before the plane sank. After three tries, Major Buang managed to drop a note from a low pass over the deck:

Can you move the helicopter to the other side, I can land on your runway, I can fly for one hour more, we have enough time to move. Please rescue me! Major Buang, wife and 5 child.

Despite the possibility that he might be court martialed, Captain Chambers issued the order to allow the plane to land on Midway's flight deck. The arresting wires were then removed, all helicopters that could not be safely or quickly relocated were pushed over the side and into the sea. An estimated US$10 million ($59.8 million in 2025) worth of UH-1 Huey helicopters were pushed overboard into the South China Sea. With a 500-foot (150 m) ceiling, five-mile (8.0 km) visibility, light rain, and 15 knots (28 km/h; 17 mph) of surface wind, Chambers ordered the ship to make 25 knots (46 km/h; 29 mph) into the wind. Warnings about the dangerous downdrafts created behind a steaming carrier were transmitted blind in both Vietnamese and English. To make matters worse, five additional UH-1s landed and cluttered up the deck. Chambers ordered them scuttled as well. Captain Chambers recalled in an article in the Fall 1993 issue of the Naval Aviation Museum Foundation's Foundation magazine that:

the aircraft cleared the ramp and touched down on center line at the normal touchdown point. Had he been equipped with a tailhook he could have bagged a number 3 wire. He bounced once and came stop abeam of the island, amid a wildly cheering, arms-waving flight deck crew.

Major Buang was escorted to the bridge, where Chambers congratulated him on his outstanding piloting and his bravery. The crew of Midway was so impressed that they established a fund to help him and his family get settled in the United States. The Bird Dog that Major Buang landed is now on display at the National Naval Aviation Museum at Naval Air Station Pensacola, Florida.

At the time, Chambers had only been in command of Midway for four or five weeks and believed that his order would get him court martialed. He also called Buang-Ly the "Bravest man I have ever met in my life" and said of his decision to allow Ly to land:

"When a man has the courage to put his family in a plane and make a daring escape like that, you have to have the heart to let him in."

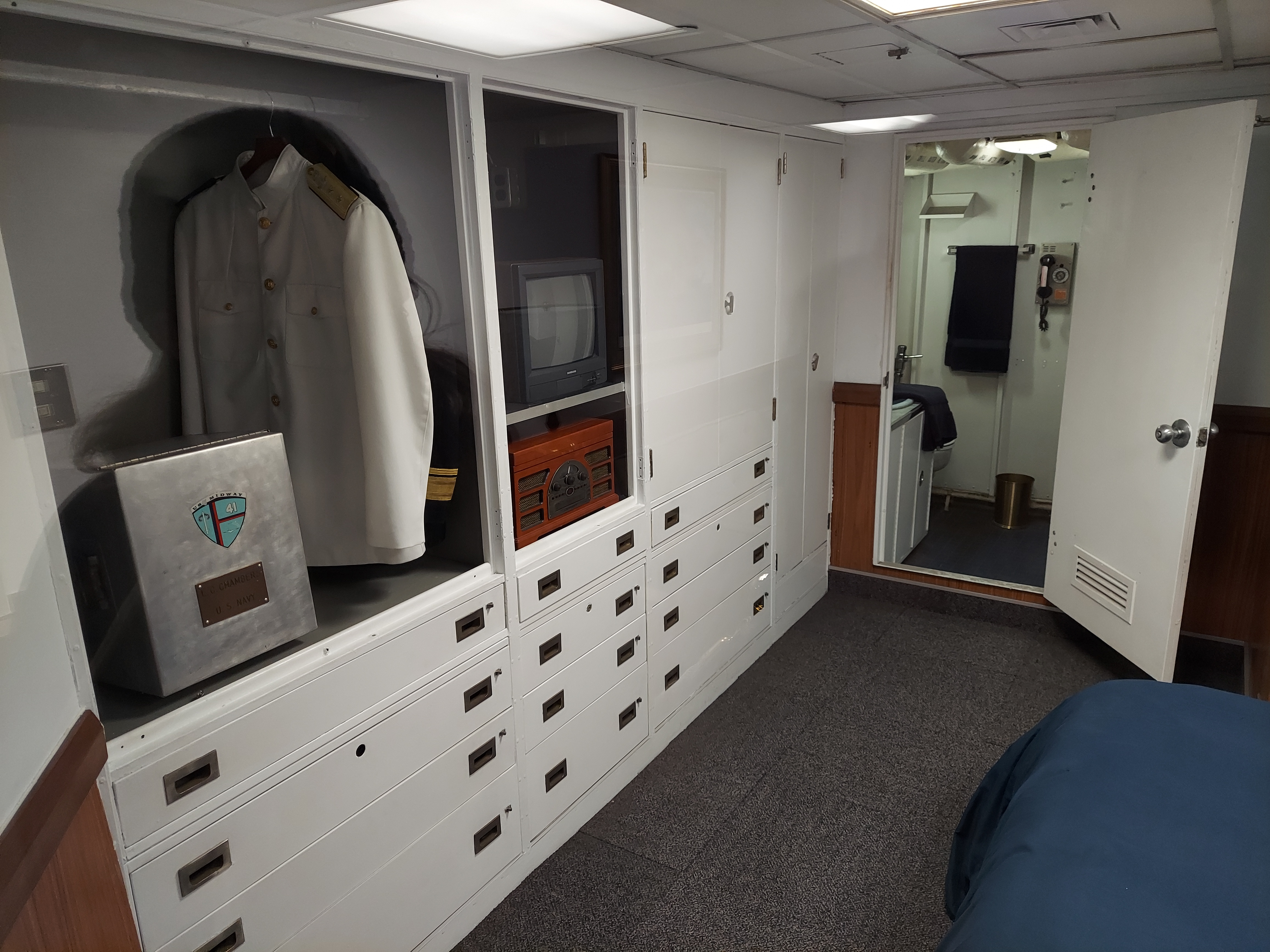

== Later life ==
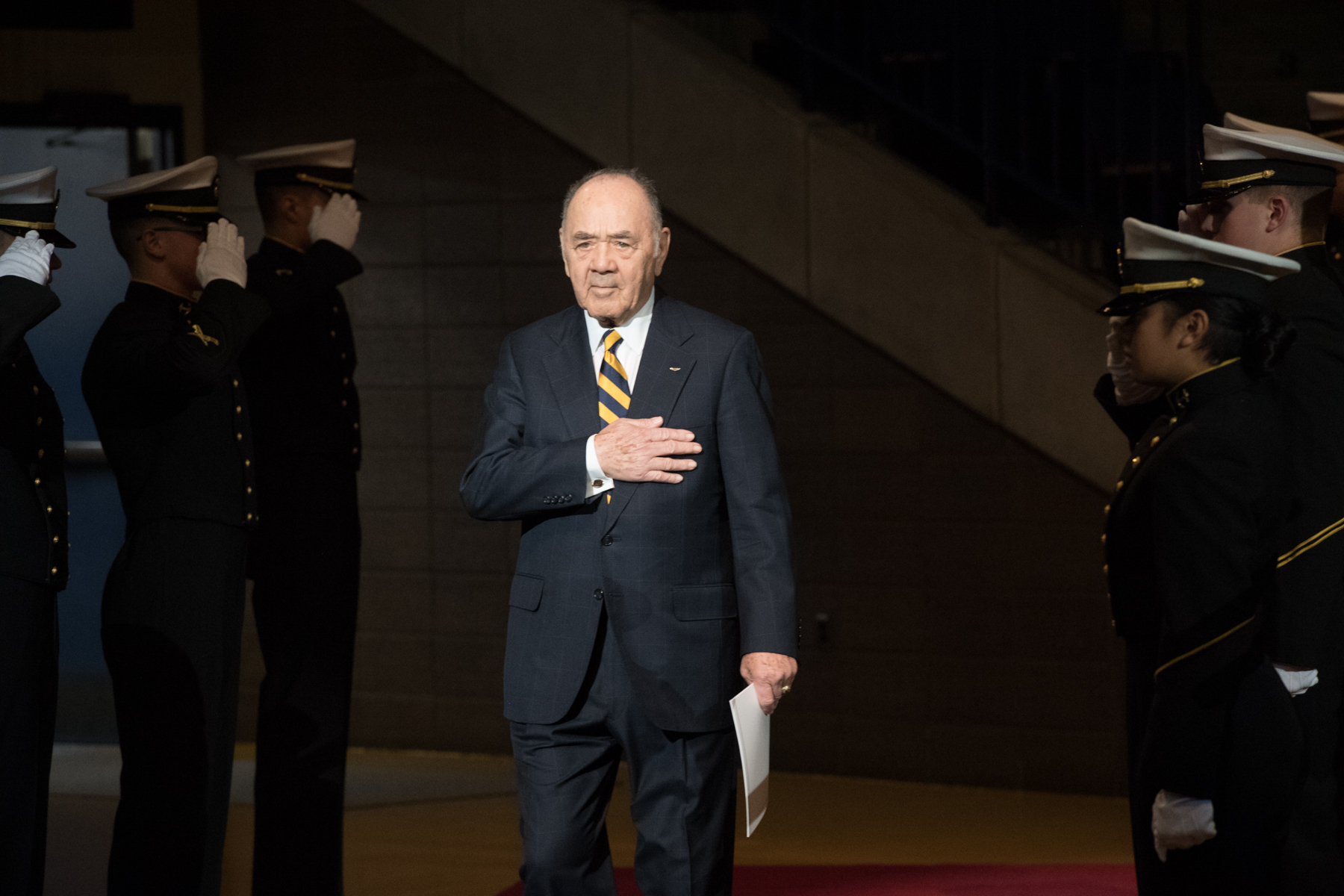
Larry Chambers (2018; age 88).

After retiring from the Navy, Chambers became director of program development at System Development Corporation. In 2010, Chambers took part in commemorations honoring Operation Frequent Wind.

On April 29, 2015, Chambers traveled to San Diego, California, to speak aboard USS Midway, now a museum ship open to the public, in commemoration of the 40th anniversary of Operation Frequent Wind.

Chambers, together with Gordon Brown, is involved in supporting youth through the "Admiral Chambers and Gordon Brown Sr. Golf Invitational". This annual event raises funds for the "San Diego Inner City Junior Golf Foundation", a nonprofit founded by Brown and his son. The foundation offers inner-city youth the opportunity to learn golf and develop life skills, with proceeds from the event going toward scholarships for students.

== See also ==
- James H. Conyers, the first African American to attend the U.S. Naval Academy
