= Cửa Ông Temple =

Historic temple in Cẩm Phả, Vietnam

Coordinates: 21.027°N 107.370°E

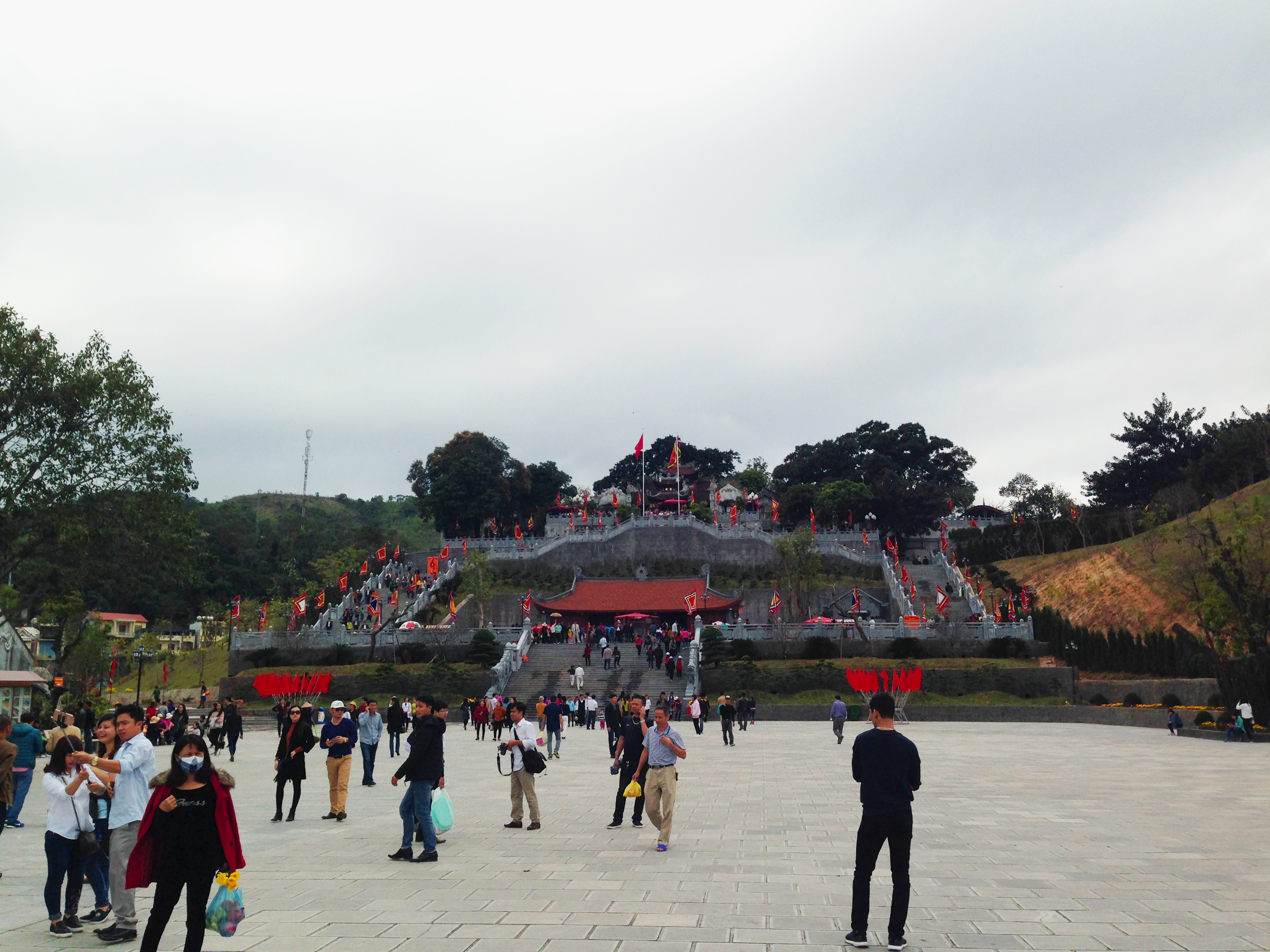
Cửa Ông Temple

Cửa Ông Temple (Vietnamese: Đền Cửa Ông) is located in Cửa Ông Ward, Cẩm Phả, Quảng Ninh province, Vietnam. This is a place of worship for Hưng Nhượng Đại Vương Trần Quốc Tảng, a famous figure during the Trần dynasty, and it is also the venue for the annual Cửa Ông Temple Festival. At the end of 2017, Cửa Ông Temple was classified by the government as a Special National Site.

== Location ==
Cửa Ông Temple is situated on a high hill, approximately 100m above sea level, in Zone 9A of Cửa Ông Ward, Cẩm Phả City, Quảng Ninh Province. The temple is located about 40 km northeast of the city center of Halong City. The total planned area of Cửa Ông Temple is 12,125 hectares.

The temple enjoys a favorable geographical position, with a combination of Feng Shui advantages. It faces the sea and is surrounded by scenic features such as Thanh Long (Green Dragon) to the left and Bạch Hổ (White Tiger) to the right. In front of the temple lies Minh Đường (Bái Tử Long Bay), and behind it is Huyền Vũ (a prosperous valley densely populated by local residents, with a range of mountains extending to Mông Dương, providing a solid foundation).

== History ==
Before worshiping Trần Quốc Tảng, the area of Cửa Ông Temple only had the Hoàng Tiết Chế Temple. At that time, people worshiped Hoàng Cần, a local hero who had made great contributions in fighting against invaders and pirates, and the emperors bestowed upon him the title "Khâm Sai Đồng Đạo Tiết Chế" (Courageous General Defending the Eastern Sea).

From the beginning of the 20th century, people upgraded (destroyed and rebuilt) the Hoàng Tiết Chế Temple into the Cửa Ông Temple. Since then, Trần Quốc Tảng was worshiped as the main deity here, alongside Hoàng Cần and other deities. Many people mistakenly believed that Trần Quốc Tảng had been worshiped here for a long time, but it was not until 1887 and beyond that there was no record of any temple dedicated to him in the Cẩm Phả area, as only the Hoàng Tiết Chế Temple dedicated to Hoàng Cần was mentioned in the Đồng Khánh Địa Dư Chí (an old geography book).

This confusion seems to have originated from Hoàng Việt Văn Tuyển, a book by Bùi Huy Bích (1744-1818), in which the author stated that Hưng Ninh Vương was Trần Quốc Tảng. However, An Nam chí lược, compiled by Lê Tắc in 1335, clearly stated that Hưng Ninh Vương Trần Tung (Tuệ Trung Thượng Sĩ) was the older brother of the Crown Prince (referring to Trần Thánh Tông), and Trần Quốc Tảng was just the older brother of Trần Nhân Tông, who should be called "chú" (uncle) to address Trần Thánh Tông. Hưng Ninh Vương "retreated to live in Tịnh Bang hamlet and changed his name to Hương Vạn Niên. Tịnh Bang and An Bang were part of the Trần dynasty; An Quảng belonged to the Later Lê dynasty; and they later became Quảng Yên and Hải Ninh provinces during the Nguyễn dynasty and are now part of Quảng Ninh province. Note that the accuracy of geographical names is not entirely certain due to the multiple administrative divisions throughout history. Some sources state that Tịnh Bang, where Trần Tung retreated to, was in Vĩnh Bảo, Haiphong, nowadays. However, it can be determined that Tinh Bang was near Yên Tử (the land of the Trúc Lâm school), situated at the border between Quảng Ninh and Haiphong nowadays. The town of Quảng Yên also had a gate called "Cửa Suất" (mispronounced as "Cửa Suốt"), and from "Cửa Suốt Quảng Yên," it became "Cửa Suốt Cửa Ông," which is still part of Quảng Yên province.

== Festival ==
The Cửa Ông Temple Festival is one of the major festivals in Quảng Ninh province, held annually on the 3rd day of the 2nd lunar month. According to tradition, people often visit Cửa Ông Temple from the beginning of the Vietnamese New Year, following the festival tourism route of Côn Sơn - Kiếp Bạc - Yên Tử - Cửa Ông.

Cửa Ông Temple attracts the most visitors and is most bustling during the festival season, which takes place from the 3rd day of the 2nd lunar month and lasts for three months in spring. The festival features a variety of cultural activities. It starts with the offering ceremony, followed by the procession of the tablet of Trần Quốc Tảng from Cửa Ông Temple to the Nhãn Garden Temple - the place where, according to legend, Đức Ông drifted into a deity and returned to the temple. This procession reenacts the coastal protection tours of Hưng Nhượng Vương in the past, symbolizing the remembrance of his merits in safeguarding the nation's borders. During the festival days, there are also cultural activities such as dragon dances, displaying fruit trays, offering sacrifices to Đức Ông, and traditional folk games like blindfolded pot smashing, tug-of-war, and pushing sticks.

The Cửa Ông Temple Festival in Quảng Ninh was recognized as a national intangible cultural heritage by the Ministry of Culture, Sports, and Tourism at the end of 2016.

== Tourism ==
Cửa Ông Temple is a populae tourist destination in Quảng Ninh province, specifically and in the northern region in general. Every year, Cửa Ông Temple attracts about 800,000 visitors. In the first two months of 2019 alone, there were 14,000 visitors with a total amount of revenue at the temple exceeding 10 billion Vietnamese dong.
