= VA-185 (U.S. Navy) =

Attack Squadron 185
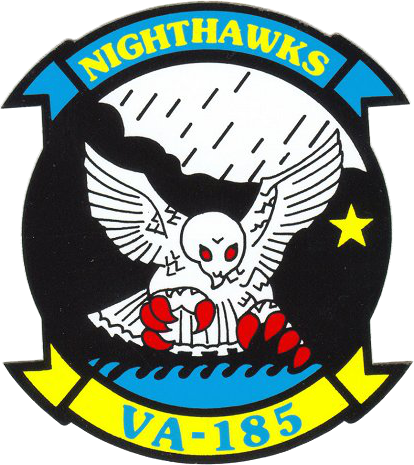
- Active: 1 December 1986 - 30 August 1991
- Country: United States
- Branch: United States Navy
- Type: Attack
- Nickname(s): Nighthawks

Aircraft flown
- Attack: A-6E/KA-6D Intruder

VA-185, nicknamed the Nighthawks, was an Attack Squadron of the U.S. Navy. It was established on 1 December 1986 and disestablished on 30 August 1991.

== Operational history ==
=== 1980s ===
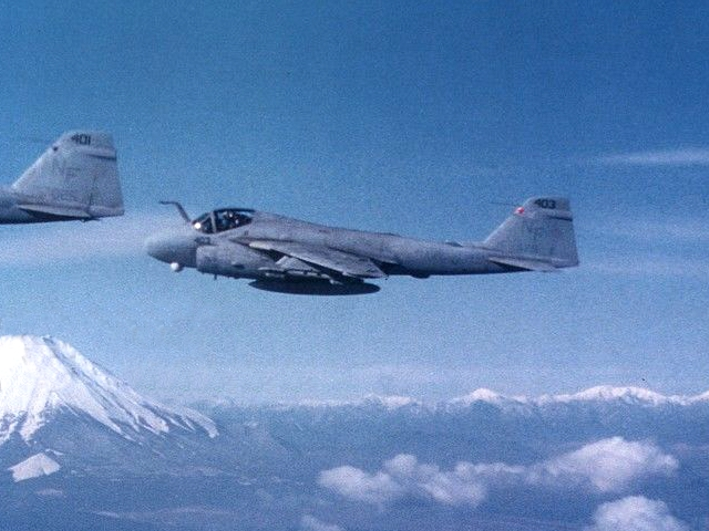
A-6E TRAM Intruders of VA-185 in 1988.

In September 1987, the squadron was forward deployed to NAS Atsugi, Japan, and assigned to USS Midway, home ported at Naval Station Yokosuka, Japan. From November 1987 to January 1988: The squadron flew support for Operation Earnest Will, escort operations for reflagged Kuawiti oil tankers during the Iran–Iraq War in the Persian Gulf. In September, VA-185, embarked on USS Midway, operated in the Sea of Japan during the 1988 Summer Olympics being held in Seoul, Korea, to demonstrate U.S. support for a peaceful olympics. In December 1989, Midway, with VA-185 embarked, maintained station off the coast of the Philippines during an attempted coup in that country.

=== 1991 Gulf War ===
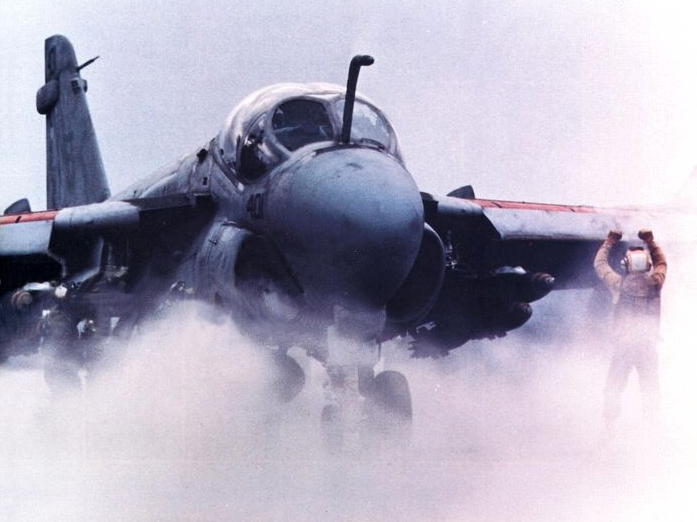
An A-6E TRAM Intruder of VA-185 on the USS Midway in 1991.

On October 2, 1990, VA-185 embarked on the Midway to the Persian Gulf in response to the Invasion of Kuwait in August. Between November 1990 and January 1991, the squadron flew missions in support of Operation Desert Shield, the build-up of American and Allied forces to counter a threatened invasion of Saudi Arabia by Iraq and were part of an economic blockade of Iraq to force its withdrawal from Kuwait.

From January to February 1991, the squadron participated in Operation Desert Storm. VA-185 led the first air strikes from naval elements operating in the Persian Gulf. During the Gulf War, squadron aircraft struck Iraqi naval targets and bases, airfields and bridges, and provided close air support for Allied ground forces. The squadron flew a total of 457 combat missions, comprising 940 combat flight hours and delivered 720,000 pounds of ordnance on enemy targets.

=== Fate ===
On 6 August 1991, the squadron held a disestablishment ceremony at NAF Atsugi, Japan. After transferring moving with CVW-14 on the Midway in Hawaii it was officially disestablished on 30 August 1991 before the Midway arrived back in the United States. Intruder aircraft from VA-185 were transferred to VA-115. Many the squadron's personnel transferred to VA-115 as well and returned to NAF Atsugi to continue duty with CVW-5.

== Home port assignments ==
The squadron was assigned to these home ports, effective on the dates shown:

- NAS Whidbey Island – 01 Dec 1986
- NAF Atsugi – 13 Sep 1987 (VA-185 was forward deployed and based aboard USS Midway (CV-41).)

== Aircraft assignment ==
The squadron first received the following aircraft on the dates shown:

- A-6E TRAM Intruder – 18 Feb 1987
- KA-6D Intruder – 19 Sep 1987

== See also ==
- List of squadrons in the Dictionary of American Naval Aviation Squadrons
- Attack aircraft
- List of inactive United States Navy aircraft squadrons
- History of the United States Navy
