= Andrew Chambers =

United States Army general (1931–2017)

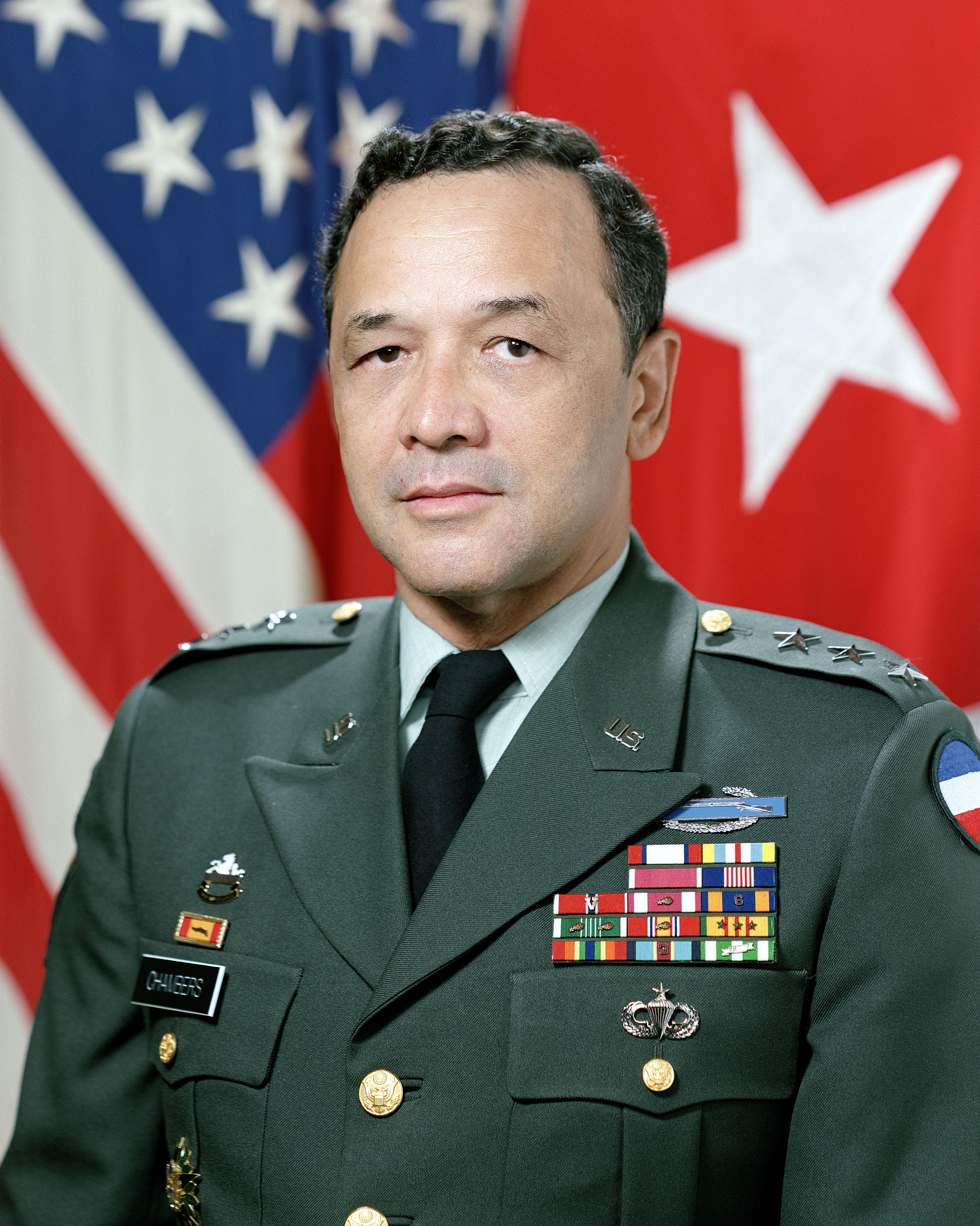
- Born: June 30, 1931; Bedford, Virginia, U.S.
- Died: June 3, 2017 (aged 85); Sterling, Virginia, U.S.
- Burial place: Arlington National Cemetery
- Military career
- Allegiance: United States
- Branch: United States Army
- Rank: Lieutenant General
- Commands: United States Army Central; VII Corps; 1st Cavalry Division; 1st Battalion, 509th Infantry Regiment
- Conflicts: Vietnam War
- Awards: Army Distinguished Service Medal (2); Defense Superior Service Medal; Legion of Merit; Soldier's Medal; Bronze Star Medal

Andrew Phillip Chambers (June 30, 1931 – June 3, 2017) was a lieutenant general in the United States Army. An alumnus of Howard University, he was a commanding general of the VII Corps and the United States Army Central in the 1980s. He received a B.S. degree in physical education from Howard University in 1954 and later earned an M.S. degree in communications from Shippensburg State College. The then Major General Chambers commanded the 1st Cavalry Division at Fort Hood, Texas, between July 1982 and June 1984. He also was director of the Army Equal Opportunity Program. His brother, Lawrence Chambers, an alumnus of the United States Naval Academy, was a rear admiral in the United States Navy. He and his brother are the first black siblings to hold flag ranks in the United States Military. After his death, Chambers was interred at Arlington National Cemetery on October 18, 2017.
