= Mông Dương =

Coordinates: 21°3′19″N 107°20′35″E

- Ward
- Location in Vietnam Mông Dương (Southeast Asia) Mông Dương (Asia)
- Country: Vietnam
- Region: Northern Vietnam
- City: Quảng Ninh
- Founded: 1981

Area
  - Total: 11,983 km^{2} (4,627 sq mi)

Population (2013)
  - Total: 16,000
  - Density: 133/km^{2} (340/sq mi)
- Time zone: GMT + 7

Mông Dương is a ward of Quảng Ninh, Vietnam. It is the site of the Mông Dương thermal power plant projects designed to reduce Vietnam's dependence on hydropower.

== Mông Dương power project ==
State-owned Electricity of Việt Nam (EVN) plans 2,200 MW of coal-fired power stations at Mông Dương.

- Mông Dương I Thermal Power Plant (1,000 MW) was ADB part financed. The financing framework was signed in 2007. The plant required a total investment of US$1.1 billion. NTP 15-Dec-2011, #1 COD 15-Apr-2015, #2 COD 15-Oct-2015.

Final completion ceremony at site was on 16 January 2016. - Boiler Type : CFB (Foster Wheeler China) - Capacity : 250 MW × 4 units

- Mông Dương II will sell electricity to Vietnam Electricity (EVN) under a 25-year power purchase agreement (PPA) denominated in US dollars and allowing for a fuel cost pass-through, protecting foreign investors from fluctuations in coal prices. NTP was on 7-Aug-2011, #1 COD was on (Plan/Actual) 04-Dec-2014/09-Mar-2015, #2 COD was on (Plan/Actual) 02-Jun-2015/24-Apr-2015. Final Completion Ceremony was on Hanoi Marriot Hotel, 26-Oct-2015.

- Boiler Type : Downshot - Capacity : 560 MW × 2 units

== See also ==
- Energy in Vietnam
