= Cẩm Phả =

- Central area of Cẩm Phả Ward
- Nickname: Land of a Million Roses
- Interactive map of Cẩm Phả
- Coordinates: 21.010270839965667°N 107.27313337088754°E
- Country: Vietnam
- City: Quảng Ninh
- Region: Red River Delta
- Established: 16 June 2025

Area
  - Total: 17.52 km^{2} (6.76 sq mi)

Population (2025)
  - Total: 61,506
  - Density: 3,510/km^{2} (9,100/sq mi)

Cẩm Phả is a ward of Quảng Ninh, Vietnam. The ward inherited its name from the former Cẩm Phả City in Quảng Ninh Province.

== History ==
The area of present-day Cẩm Phả Ward formerly belonged to Cẩm Phả City, Quảng Ninh Province (formerly known as Vietnam's "coal capital").

On 16 June 2025:

- The National Assembly adopted Resolution No. 203/2025/QH15 amending and supplementing several articles of the Constitution of the Socialist Republic of Vietnam. The resolution took effect on 16 June 2025. Under the resolution, district-level administrative units throughout Vietnam ceased to operate from 1 July 2025.
- The Standing Committee of the National Assembly of Vietnam adopted Resolution No. 1679/NQ-UBTVQH15 on the reorganization of commune-level administrative units in Quảng Ninh Province in 2025. The resolution took effect on 16 June 2025. Under the resolution, the entire natural area and population of Cẩm Trung, Cẩm Thành, Cẩm Bình, Cẩm Tây, and Cẩm Đông wards were merged to form a new ward named Cẩm Phả.

On 24 August 2026, the National Assembly adopted Resolution No. 36/2026/QH16 establishing Quảng Ninh City on the basis of the entire natural area and population of Quảng Ninh Province. The resolution took effect on 1 September 2026. Since then, Cẩm Phả Ward has been part of Quảng Ninh City.
