= Mường Autonomous Territory =

Mường Autonomous Territory Pays Muong / Territoire Autonome Muong / Fédération Muong Xứ Mường / Khu tự trị Mường
- 1947–1952
- Flag

- The Mường Autonomous Territory within the State of Vietnam.
- Status: Autonomous territory of Tonkin (1947–1948); Autonomous Federation within the French Union (1947–1950); Crown domain of the Vietnamese Emperor (1950–1952)
- Capital: Hòa Bình
- Common languages: Mường, French, Vietnamese
- Ethnic groups: Mường, Thái, Kinh
- Government: Feudal Lordships (Autonomous territory)
- Historical era: Cold War
  - Established: 1947
  - Battle of Hòa Bình: 10 November 1951 – 25 February 1952
  - Việt Minh capture Hòa Bình: 25 February 1952

Area
  - Total: 45,966 km^{2} (17,748 sq mi)
- Currency: piastre
Preceded by	Succeeded by
Hòa Bình Province	Hòa Bình Province
- Today part of: Hòa Bình Province, Vietnam

The Mường Autonomous Territory (French: Territoire Autonome Muong; Vietnamese: Khu tự trị Mường; Muong: Khu tữ tlĩ Mường), or the Mường Country (French: Pays Muong; Vietnamese: Xứ Mường) or the Mường Federation (French: Fédération Muong), abbreviated as TAM, was an autonomous territory created by the French during the First Indochina War as a homeland for the Mường people in an effort to get indigenous support against the Kinh-dominant, Việt Minh-led Democratic Republic of Vietnam. The Mường Autonomous Territory was an autonomous homeland within the French Union and covered the Hòa Bình Province. The French hoped that granting the Mường more autonomy would allow them to recruit more soldiers to fight against the Democratic Republic of Vietnam as the French did not have enough French soldiers in their Indochina to maintain control over the territory. The Mường Autonomous Territory became a part of the Domain of the Crown within the State of Vietnam in 1950, this area consisted of autonomous territories made up of ethnic minorities that nominally were under the direct control of the Nguyễn dynasty Emperor Bảo Đại.

Despite the French efforts to hold back the Communist Việt Minh, the Hòa Bình Province was reconquered by the Democratic Republic of Vietnam in 1952 and the Mường Autonomous Territory was dissolved. Despite the loss of their territory to the Việt Minh, Mường battalions could continue to serve for the French for the remainder of the First Indochina War.

== History ==
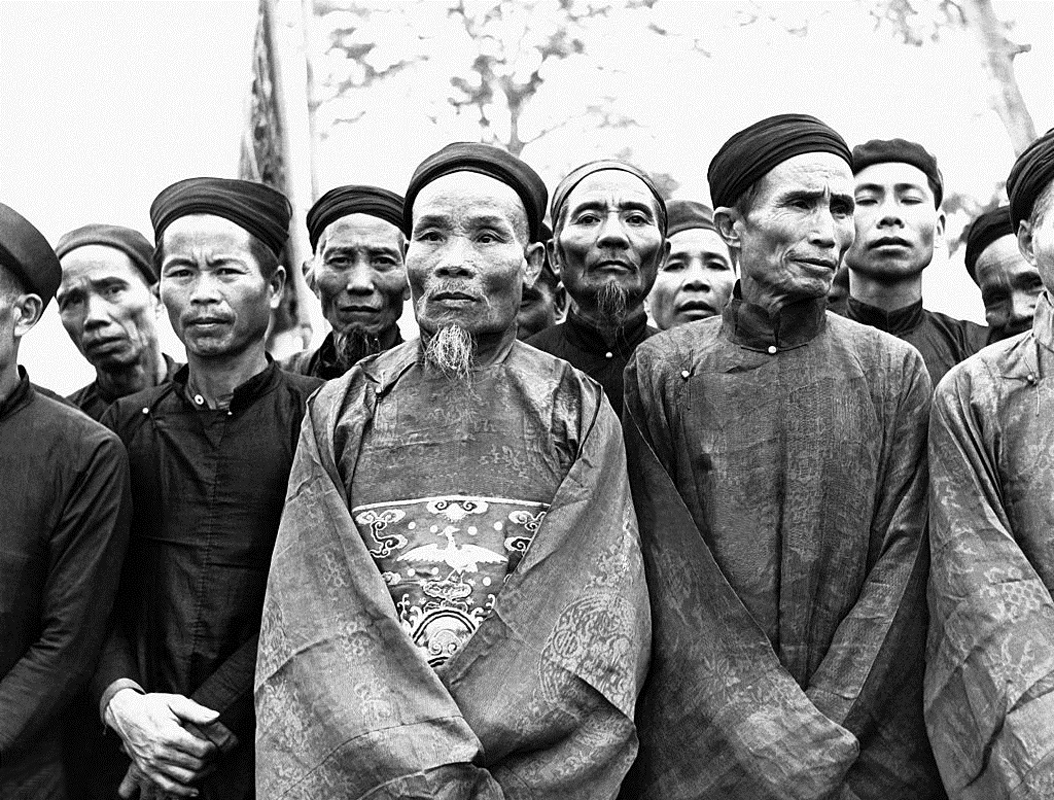
Mường provincial dignitaries during a ceremony to welcome the Chief of State Bảo Đại, 21 December 1951.

The Mường people are indigenous to the hilly areas in the South-west of the Red River Delta and share an ethnic roots to the Vietnamese (Kinh) people. The Mường polities had a special autonomous status within the Nguyễn dynasty, unlike other Vietnamese provinces which had a Tổng đốc (總督) or a Tuần phủ (巡撫) the Hòa Bình Province was governed by a hereditary mandarin titled the Quan-Lang (官郎), the Quan-Lang was an indigenous Mường rather than a Kinh. Unlike the Confucian meritocratic system where government officials were selected through centralised examination, the Mường communities were under the jurisdiction of hereditary lords. The lord held both legal authority and religious authority over his subjects, as the lords oversaw both local legal affairs as well as the ancestor worship ceremonies of the Mường tribes. The colonial French government also regarded them as "Montagnards" and created a separate province for them where they retained more autonomy.

After the end of World War II with the surrender of Japan, the French lost control of French Indochina and attempted to regain it from the Việt Minh-led Democratic Republic of Vietnam. In order to counter the calls for unification of Vietnam, the government of French Indochina established the Mường Autonomous Territory in the Hòa Bình Province in 1947.

From the start of the First Indochina War, two problems arose for the French, first was dealing with the lack of personnel and second was involving the local populations in order, among other things, benefit from their knowledge. In the year 1946, General Leclerc called on the colonial French Indochinese government and proposed to incorporate the ethnic minority population into the French Expeditionary Force of the Far East (Corps Expéditionnaire Français d’Extrême-Orient or CEFEO). Thus, thousands of men, coming mainly from ethnic minorities in the mountains of Tonkin, hostile to the aims of the Communist partisans, enlisted in this French army, and formed Companies of Military Supplements. They were not the only colonial troops serving on this front as the French used Algerians, Moroccans, and Senegalese as well. At this time the Lords of the Mường sent their legions to aid the French in their struggle against the Communists forming the Mường Battalions.

In 1948, the Mường country obtained a certain level of independence within the framework of the new Vietnamese state. A flag was selected for the territory, this was depicted a white five-pointed star on a green background. The colour white was meant to symbolise purity and the five-pointed star symbolised the five "Châu" (州, Districts) of the Mường country.

In 1948 the Việt Minh began setting up camps made from straw huts in the Hòa Bình Province and began attacking the French in minor skirmishes.

On 15 April 1950 it was nominally placed under the authority of the Domain of the Crown with the enactment of the Dụ số 6/QT/TG decree by Chief of State Bảo Đại.

In mid-November 1951 the Mường country's defenses began being tested by constant offenses by the Việt Minh following a battle at Nghĩa Lộ, the French and Mường forces were starved of cash and were dependent on financial aid from the United States to keep their military equipped to continue handling the Communist advance. The Việt Minh had much trouble holding on to occupied lands in Hòa Bình as the Mường populace largely remained loyal to the French. The Việt Minh captured Hòa Bình, but on 14 November 1951 three French battalions landed in Hòa Bình by parachute commanded by Colonel Clément and a day later the Mường country was under French control again. Despite the French efforts to hold back the Communist Việt Minh, the Hòa Bình Province was reconquered by the Democratic Republic of Vietnam in February 1952 and the Mường Autonomous Territory was de facto dissolved while continuing to exist on paper. After the loss of their territory to the Việt Minh, Mường battalions could continue to serve for the French for the remainder of the First Indochina War until the French officially recognised Việt Minh control over North Vietnam with the Geneva Accords in 1954.

== See also ==
- Montagnard country of South Indochina
- Nùng Autonomous Territory
- Sip Song Chau Tai

== Sources ==
- Thabaut, André - Médecin lieutenant au 1er bataillon muong: Indochine (1954-1955) (Médecine des conflits armés) ISBN 9782747563314 (in French).
