= Battle of Hòa Bình =

1951 battle of the First Indochina War

Coordinates: 20°48′48″N 105°20′18″E

- Part of the First Indochina War
Date	10 November 1951 – 25 February 1952
Location	Hòa Bình, Vietnam
Result	Việt Minh victory: Viet Minh captured Hoà Bình; Abolishment of the Mường Autonomous Territory

Belligerents
French Union; France; French Indochina; State of Vietnam; Mường Autonomous Territory	Democratic Republic of Vietnam: (North Vietnam) Việt Minh

Commanders and leaders
Jean de Tassigny (1951); Raoul Salan (1952)	Võ Nguyên Giáp; Hoàng Văn Thái

Casualties and losses
French: 894 killed or missing 2,000 wounded State of Vietnam: unknown 5,000 At most	Estimate 5,000 – 12,000 killed or wounded

The Battle of Hòa Bình was fought during the First Indochina War. It occurred from 10 November 1951 to 25 February 1952, when French Union forces attempted to lure the Việt Minh out into the open and to force it to fight on French terms.

== Prelude ==
Following the string of defensive victories during the early months of 1951, the French command under General Jean de Lattre de Tassigny sought to go back on the offensive. After the French victory at the battle of Đông Triều, de Lattre had drawn up a plan to test his offensive strategy.

Hòa Bình, capital of the Muong people, located 62 kilometres (39 mi) from Hanoi, was selected by General de Lattre for the offensive. Hòa Bình was an area of strategic significance for many reasons. For the Việt Minh, the control of Hòa Bình would allow them free movement in the valleys north of Hanoi as well as the flow of military supplies. De Lattre’s plan was to take Hòa Bình, where Giáp's regular divisions would be forced to confront superior French firepower and eventually be destroyed.

== Battle ==
=== Phase I & II ===
On 10 November 1951, Operation Tulipe was launched with the objective of seizing Chợ Bến Pass and extending French control beyond Provincial Route 21.

After the French Task Force North and the 1st Foreign Parachute Battalion (1er BEP) had linked up west of Chợ Bến, they both continued the thrust while other mobile groups were moving in from the south and the east. At this point, the Việt Minh were forced to abandon Chợ Bến, but heavy fighting occurred between the French and elements of the Việt Minh that included the 64th Regiment and 164th Regional Battalion. By the end of the day, the French Union forces had achieved their objective with Mobile Group 2 and 1st Colonial Parachute Battalion (1er BPC) reaching their target north of Chợ Bến.

With the completion of the first phase, de Lattre planned his next move. Realizing the difficulty of phase two, de Lattre divided French Union forces into three operational groups, which together would capture Hòa Bình by land, sea and air. Mobile Group 7, as part of Group North, would move southward along the Black River with a riverine unit. Group South, which consists of Mobile Group 3, would link up with paratroop battalions in Hòa Bình. Mobile Group 2 would form an operational liaison group for the other two Mobile Groups.

By the early hours of 14 November, both Operational Group North and South had reached their initial objectives. On the morning of 14 November, the 1st Colonial Parachute Battalion, the 2nd Colonial Parachute Battalion (2e BPC) and the 7th Colonial Parachute Battalion (7e BPC) captured Hòa Bình with ease against little or no resistance from the Việt Minh.

Mobile Group 3 took the lead in the clearing operations along Colonial Route 6, while Mobile Group 3 linked up with the three paratroop battalions after crossing the Black River. By 22 November, the operation was over with the French Union troops having suffered light casualties.

=== Giáp's counterattack ===
On 21 November, General Võ Nguyên Giáp decided to deal with the French by ordering his 304th and 312th Divisions from the Red River. The two divisions were ordered to move against French lines of communication leading to Hòa Bình.

French bases at Ap Da Chong, Ap Phu To, Dan The, La Phu, Rocher Notre-Dame, Xom Bu and Tu Vu were places where General Giáp's regular divisions would initiate the first challenge. The 304th and 312th divisions were in position to isolate Ap Da Chong and cut French communication lines and isolate or eliminate strongpoints. Due to the build-up of Việt Minh forces in the area, elements of the 1st Colonial Parachute Battalion were ordered to reinforce Thu Phap.

Between 10 December and 14 December, there were heavy engagements between the French Union and Việt Minh forces. First, the Việt Minh 88th Regiment pounded Tu Vu but was driven off by two Moroccan companies supported by tanks. Then the 165th and 209th Regiments of the Việt Minh 312th Division infiltrated Ba Tri and Ba Vì, where they faced Mobile Group 4. The 5th Colonial Parachute Battalion, with support from Sherman tanks, was sent in to remove the Việt Minh. A company from the 5e BPC, however, was ambushed by the 165th Regiment and heavy casualties were suffered as a result.

On 11 January 1952, General de Lattre died at the Neuilly military hospital due to cancer. At the same time, Võ Nguyên Giáp began to concentrate his troops on Hòa Bình and Colonial Route 6 as the 304th, 308th and 312th Divisions were being redeployed with fresh reinforcements.

From the end of 1951, the buildup of Việt Minh presence around Colonial Route 6 was noted by French military intelligence. The Việt Minh made no secret of their presence, as they regularly attacked French convoys and conducted sapper attacks on French positions. The new commander of French Union forces, General Gonzales de Linares, planned to take back Colonial Route 6 piece by piece.

Between 10 January and 29 January, the French Union armies managed to clear Dong Ben, Xom Pheo, Bai Lang, Xuan Mai, Kem Pass and Ao Trach under heavy Việt Minh pressure. Each time, French forces relied upon artillery and close air support to inflict damages on the Việt Minh. On 30 January, the Việt Minh went back on the offensive at Suc Sich, where they battled with a company from the 8th Colonial Parachute Battalion.

Although the French army still held Hòa Bình and Colonial Route 6, the area under true French control extended only from Hanoi to Xuan Mai. Manning French outposts between Don Goi and Hoa Binh put heavy pressure on French manpower, where 20,000 troops were tied down. As a result of this, when the Việt Minh 316th and 320th Divisions moved in to replace the other divisions, General Salan decided to withdraw the remaining French forces. By 25 February 1952, the evacuation of French troops from Hòa Bình was completed.

== Aftermath ==
From the beginning, French Union forces sought to draw the Việt Minh out to fight on French terms; however, they subsequently went on the defensive as General Võ Nguyên Giáp continued to put heavy pressure on French positions. Although suffering heavier casualties than the French, the Việt Minh came out victorious. Casualties were heavy on both sides, with Tucker listing French losses as 436 killed and 458 missing, and Viet Minh casualties of approximately 12,000. Davidson records total French casualties of around 5,000 men, while Viet Minh losses were "at least that number".
