= Léon Pignon =

French high commissioner in Indochina

- Born: April 19, 1908; Angoulême, France
- Died: April 4, 1976; Paris, France

Léon Marie Adolphe Pascal Pignon (French pronunciation: [leɔ̃ maʁi adɔlf paskal piɲɔ̃]; April 19, 1908 – April 4, 1976) was the French high commissioner in Indochina from October 1948 until December 1950.

According to the memoires of Bảo Đại, he wrote that the creation of the Domain of the Crown in the State of Vietnam was suggested to him by Léon Pignon in Paris who argued that the lands of ethnic minorities were never directly administered by the imperial court of the Nguyễn dynasty and could be assigned to the Chief of State in order to help the unification of Vietnam. Bảo Đại claimed that he accepted the proposal because he believed that he could help in the ethnic minority tribes in their development and enjoy the serene environment of the territories.
