= Nùng Autonomous Territory =

Historical territory in Northern Vietnam

Nùng Autonomous Territory Pays Nung / Territoire Autonome Nung Xứ Nùng / Khu tự trị Nùng 農處 / 農族自治區
- 1947–1954
- Flag Coat of arms
- Motto: "Trung Hiếu" (忠孝) (English: "Loyalty", "Filial piety")
- A political and demographic map of the Hải Ninh Province at the time of the Nùng Autonomous Territory.
- Status: Autonomous territory of Tonkin (1947–1948); Autonomous federation within the French Union (1947–50); Crown domain of the Vietnamese Emperor (1950–54)
- Capital: Móng Cái
- Common languages: Chinese (Hakka and Jyut), French, Vietnamese
- Ethnic groups: Chinese Nùng, Dao, Kinh, Thổ, Sán Dìu, and Ngái
- Lãnh tụ Nùng
  - 1947–1954: Voòng A Sáng (Note: Voòng A Sáng is the Chinese language (Hakka) reading of "黃亞生", alternatively romanised as Vòng A Sáng or Vòng-A-Sáng. The Vietnamese reading of this name would be Hoàng À Sinh, he is alternatively known as Hoàng Phúc Thịnh (黃福盛).)
- Historical era: Cold War
  - Established: 1947
  - Geneva Accords: 20 July 1954

Area
  - Total: 4.500 km^{2} (1.737 sq mi)

Population
  - 1949: 120.000
- Currency: piastre (1947—1953) đồng (from 1953)
Preceded by	Succeeded by
Hải Ninh Province; Móng Cái	Hải Ninh Province
- Today part of: Quảng Ninh Province and the Đình Lập District, Vietnam

The Nùng Autonomous Territory (French: Territoire Autonome Nung; Vietnamese: Khu tự trị Nùng), also known as the Hải Ninh Autonomous Territory (Vietnamese: Khu tự trị Hải Ninh), the Nùng Hải Ninh Autonomous Territory (French: Territoire autonome Nung de Hai Ninh; Vietnamese: Khu tự trị Nùng Hải Ninh), and the Nùng country (French: Pays Nung; Vietnamese: Xứ Nùng), abbreviated as TAN, was an autonomous territory for the Chinese Nùng within the French Union created during the First Indochina War by the French colonial government in Indochina. During this period the French hoped to weaken the position of the Việt Minh by granting more autonomy to ethnic minorities in Vietnam in the hopes of getting more support from them in their fight against the predominantly Kinh Việt Minh, which took control of large parts of Vietnam following the August Revolution and the power vacuum that occurred following the surrender of Japan at the end of World War II.

The Nùng Autonomous Territory was created as a homeland for the Chinese Nùng people (which should not be confused with the Tai people of the same name) in what is now the Quảng Ninh Province. The territory became a part Emperor Bảo Đại's Domain of the Crown within the State of Vietnam in 1950 and would continue to serve French interests until the territory was handed over to the Democratic Republic of Vietnam in 1954 following the Geneva Accords prompting many of its inhabitants to become refugees and moving to South Vietnam and members of its military to later join the ARV.

== Etymology ==
The Chinese Nùng's name originated from the fact that almost all of them were farmers (nong nhan in Cantonese). After the Treaty of Tientsin, the French refused to recognise this group as Chinese due to political and territorial issues on Vietnam's northern frontier border, therefore the French classified them as "Nùng" (農) based on their main occupation. The most widely used languages of the Chinese Nùng are Cantonese and Hakka Chinese since they descended from people speaking these languages.

== History ==
=== Establishment ===
Voòng A Sáng (黃亞生, 1902–1975), alternatively known as Hoàng Phúc Thịnh (黃福盛) was a commander of a Nùng regiment in the Free French Forces during World War II. After the Japanese conquered French Indochina from the French he and many of the Free French Forces were forced to take refuge in the Shiwandashan (十万大山) mountain range between the provinces of Guangdong and Guangxi in China. Voòng A Sáng, a Hakka, commanded a junk boat following the Red River from Fangchenggang, Guangxi. He and an expeditionary force of French Nùng soldiers returned to Cô Tô Island and the Vạn Hoa region where the terrain was favourable for the recapture of Móng Cái from the Việt Minh.

The junk that used by Voòng A Sáng was named the Trung Hiếu (忠孝), this ship was later used as a symbol for the recapture of Móng Cái and the founding of the Nùng Hải Ninh Autonomous Territory, it was later also used on its coat of arms.

On 14 July 1946, Captain Voòng A Sáng, on behalf of the Hải Ninh Main Force Council (Hội Đồng Quân Chính Hải Ninh), announced the establishment of the Nùng Hải Ninh Autonomous Territory within Tonkin, French Indochina, under the auspices of the High Commissioner Émile Bollaert.

=== Administrative organisation and governance ===
The Nùng Autonomous Territory had the Territorial Council (Hội đồng Lãnh thổ) as its legislative body. The Territorial Council consisted of representatives elected by its population with each delegate representing 1000 inhabitants. The territory executive had a standing ruling council. It also had a Provincial Parliament (Nghị viện tỉnh).

In the Nùng Autonomous Territory the general laws of Vietnam applied. This made it different from the contemporary Thái Autonomous Territory (Sip Song Chau Tai), where the traditional Thái law was used as the basic law.

On 15 April 1950 it was nominally placed under the authority of the Domain of the Crown with the enactment of the Dụ số 6/QT/TG decree by Chief of State Bảo Đại.

The leader of the Nùng Autonomous Territory was Voòng A Sáng, a Hakka who was born on 19 March 1902 in Tấn Mài, Hà Cối District, Hải Ninh Province, Tonkin, French Indochina (present-day Hải Hà District, Quảng Ninh Province, Vietnam). In 1914 he attended a military academy known as the học trường Thiếu Sinh Quân Núi Đèo, after graduating in 1920 he joined the French army where he was promoted to sergeant (Thượng Sĩ) in 1931. At that time, soldiers were only promoted to the rank Sergeant at the highest, if they wanted to be a Lieutenant they had to graduate from the officers' school. In 1932 he entered the Fréjus officer school in France, graduating in 1935 with the rank of Lieutenant (Thiếu Uý). He was promoted to Lieutenant Colonel (Trung Uý, 1940), Lieutenant Colonel (Đại Uý, 1945), Major (Thiếu Tá, 1949), Lieutenant Colonel (Trung Tá, 1951), and Colonel (Đại Tá, 1954). Voòng A Sáng administered the territory together with a French province-level advisor.

Regarding the judicial organisation of the Nùng Autonomous Territory, Voòng A Sáng and the French advisor established a Supreme Court (Toà án tối cao), the Second Court (Toà án cấp hai), and the Primary Court (Toà án sơ cấp). The Supreme Court consisted of Voòng A Sáng himself, a French adviser, and a congressman. In terms of military, Voòng A Sáng built up a police force that was united with the French border army, this police force were called the regular army (quân chính quy) and the militia army (quân đội dân phòng) and served as both the local security apparatus and the territory's self-defense force.

The government of the Nùng Autonomous Territory had a Ministry of Industry and Trade, Ministry of Agriculture and Fisheries, Ministry of Education, Ministry of Justice, and a Ministry of National Defense.

Its Ministry of education compiled a Ngái script dictionary named Nổng Vủn Slu Tèn (儂文字典). It used a Latin phonetic alphabet to read Ngái according to the Vietnamese pronunciation of the Northern accent.

=== Annexation by the Democratic Republic of Vietnam ===
After the Battle of Điện Biên Phủ, the Democratic Republic of Vietnam government took over the whole of Vietnam north of the 17th parallel, as a result the Nùng Autonomous Territory was also disbanded. The Nùng Autonomous Territory only existed for a total of seven years, after the takeover the territory it controlled became the North Vietnamese province of Hải Ninh.

=== Aftermath ===
Following the annexation of the Nùng Autonomous Territory by the Democratic Republic of Vietnam many of its inhabitants immigrated to South Vietnam, including Voòng A Sáng and his family as well as many members of the Nùng military regiments. At first, the group temporarily resided in Ba Ngòi (Cam Ranh Bay) and Nha Trang, afterwards, for the convenience of drinking water, the migrants flocked to live around the Ma Ó River.

On 1 August 1956 Colonel Voòng A Sáng merged the Nùng 6th battalion with the 32, 67, 71, 72, and 75 battalions to form the Dã Chiến 6th division. Division 6 Da Chien had a short period of the name of Dã Chiến 41st Division. On 1 November 1955, Dã Chiến 41st Division was renamed to the Dã Chiến 3rd Division, its headquarters was originally based at Tấn Mài, the army training centre stretched along the shore of the road's military zone Tự Do (Thống Nhất bây giờ, "Unification now"). Soon the Nùng people in South Vietnam were re-grouped at Sông Mao in the Bình Thuận Province. Organisation of a Nùng division was ordered taken in hand starting from 16 December 1954. However, it was not until 1 February 1955 that the 6th (or Nùng) Division was officially established with Voòng A Sáng at its head, making him the division's first commander. This division would change names on several occasions, it was named the 6th Infantry Division (1 August 1955), then the 6th Field Division (9 September 1955), 41st Field Division (1 November 1955), and finally the 5th Infantry Division (January 1959). The 5th Division was largely composed of Nùng people until about 1965 when its composition was increasingly ethnic Vietnamese and the Nùngs moved into MIKE Force units.

In the year 1956, during a series of purges of French colonial generals suspected of being pro-French by the United States-backed President Ngô Đình Diệm, Colonel Voòng A Sáng was forced to retire from the Army of the Republic of Vietnam (ARV).

In January 1959, the 3rd Field Division became 5th Infantry Division and was assigned to III Corps headquarters (Tactical Zone III) at Biên Hoà, replacing the 7th Division that had just been transferred to the Region. On 1 November 1963, the 5th Division participated in the overthrowing of President Ngô Đình Diệm. After being restored to his position in the South Vietnamese Army, Voòng A Sáng continued to fight for the interests of the Nùng people. In 1966, he was elected President of the Hội Trưởng Hội Thượng Du Bắc Việt Tương Tế (North Vietnamese Tương Tế Association). In this position he was an advocate for the various ethnic minorities of Bắc Việt (North Vietnam) such as the Thái, Nùng, Mường, Mán, Mèo, Etc. and supported their migration from Bắc Việt to Nam Việt (South Vietnam).

In 1967, Voòng A Sáng was elected to the Senate of the Republic of Vietnam, he was elected to be the Chairman of the Unity of the Ethnic Minorities (Chủ Tịch Khối Đoàn Kết Dân Tộc Thiểu Số) at the South Vietnamese Senate. (Note: "Chủ Tịch" can also be translated as "President", hence "Chủ Tịch Khối Đoàn Kết Dân Tộc Thiểu Số" can also be translated as "President of the Unity of the Ethnic Minorities".) In this position he advocated for a policy of positive discrimination by the South Vietnamese government to benefit North Vietnamese ethnic minority peoples, this benefited a lot of Nùng people in South Vietnam and helped them get into universities and increase their upward social mobility in South Vietnam.

During the Vietnam War, Chinese Nùng soldiers were known for their loyalty to the US Special Forces. They often served as bodyguards to the Special Forces and were regarded as a good source of security for green berets who were recruiting and training locals.

== Economy ==
In the years 1949 and 1950, rice cultivation was the most popular profession in Nùng Autonomous Territory. Rice cultivation was primarily concentrated in Hà Cối and Đầm Hà. The regions of Tiên Yên, Bình Liêu, and Hà Cối produced sugarcane and peanuts. Tấn Mài and Thán Phún grew cinnamon trees. Đình Lập and Na Húc planted anise. Bình Liêu produced a lot of silkworms. Móng Cái, the capital city, was most famous for its ceramics, and it produced matches and boats. The islands of Trà Cổ, Vĩnh Thực, and Thanh Mai had a very developed fishing industry.

The imports of the Nùng Autonomous Territory included rice, beverages, canned food, kerosene, gasoline, quick lime, and cement. The goods exported by the Nùng Autonomous Territory include pigs, chickens, ducks, spices, litchi, porcelain, do paper, anise, cinnamon, bamboo, etc.

== Districts ==
The Nùng Autonomous Territory contained 1 city (thủ phủ), 8 districts (huyện), and 1 island (hải đảo):

- Móng Cái City
- Ba Chẽ District
- Bình Liêu District
- Cửa Tiên Yên District (including a part of Mũi Chùa and Cái Bầu island)
- Đầm Hà District
- Đình Lập District (now in the Lạng Sơn Province)
- Hà Cối District
- Tiên Yên District
- Vạn Hoa District
- Cô Tô Island

Below the District-level divisions were the tổng and communes (xã).

== Demographics ==
In the year 1949 the Nùng Autonomous Territory had a population of approximately 120.000 people. The territory's population included various ethnic groups such as the Chinese Nùng (not Taï Nùng), Dao, Kinh, and the Thổ. The Chinese Nùng composed 72% to 78% of the population.

At the time of the Nùng Autonomous Territory its capital city, Móng Cái had a population of around 10.000 people.

== Medals ==
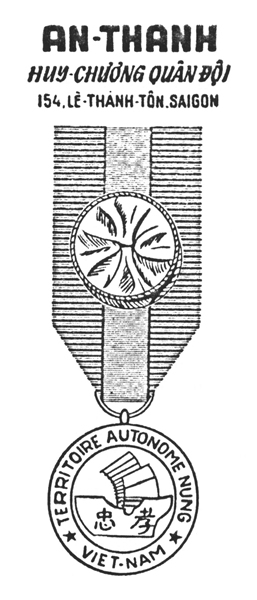
The boxtop of a medal issued by the Nùng Autonomous Territory.

A medal issued for the Nùng Autonomous Territory is known to exist. This medal was awarded for a meritorious service to the Nùng Autonomous Territory state to both military and civilian personnel of the Nùng (Montagnard) tribe. It was awarded by the French Colonial forces in two classes, "Chevalier" (Knight) and "Officier" (Officer).

The medal was 34 millimeters in diameter and was made of gold planchet, it features a stylised Chinese junk with two Traditional Chinese characters Trung Hiếu (忠孝, "loyalty") which were inscribed on the hull of the ship. On the outer rim of the medal were French the inscriptions, "TERRITOIRE AUTONOME NUNG" (Nùng Autonomous Territory) and "VIET-NAM" (Vietnam), these words were separated by a pair of stars on each side opposite of each other which surrounds the central design of the medal.

A rosette on the ribbon drape was used to distinguish the first (or "Officer") class from the second (or "Knight") class, but as of 2006 no extent specimens were known to exist.

== See also ==
- Hoa people
  - Chinese Nùng
- Montagnard country of South Indochina

== Sources ==
- Trần Đức Lai, ed. (2013) [2008]. The Nung Ethic and Autonomous Territory of Hai Ninh-Vietnam. Translated by Ngô Thanh Tùng. Hai Ninh veterans and Public Administration Alumni Association-Vietnam. ISBN 978-0-578-12004-1.
- Xiaorong Han (2009). "Spoiled Guests or Dedicated Patriots? The Chinese in North Vietnam, 1954–1978". International Journal of Asian Studies. 6 (1). Cambridge University Press: 1–36. doi:10.1017/S1479591409000011. S2CID 145394772.
