= Battle of Mạo Khê =

1951 battle of the First Indochina War

- Part of the First Indochina War
Date	March 23–28, 1951
Location	Mạo Khê, Vietnam
Result	French Union victory: France and the State of Vietnam succeeded in protecting Mạo Khê from the communists

Belligerents
French Union; France; French Indochina; State of Vietnam	Democratic Republic of Vietnam: (North Vietnam) Việt Minh

Commanders and leaders
(French Fourth Republic) Jean de Lattre de Tassigny	(North Vietnam) Võ Nguyên Giáp

Strength
400 troops reinforced by 6e BPC; 3 destroyers 2 landing craft	102nd/308th 141st/312th 209th/312th 36th/308th in all about 11,000 troops

Casualties and losses
40 killed 150 wounded	Viet Minh claim: 134 killed, 426 wounded, 14 missing Western estimate: 2,000–3,000 killed, wounded or captured

The Battle of Mạo Khê (Vietnamese: Mạo Khê, [mâːwˀ xē]), occurring from March 23 to March 28, 1951, was a significant engagement in the First Indochina War between the French Union and the communist Việt Minh. The French Union forces, including the French Far East Expeditionary Corps and Vietnamese National Army, led by World War II hero Jean de Lattre de Tassigny, inflicted a defeat on Việt Minh forces, which were commanded by General Võ Nguyên Giáp. However this victory of the French Union (France and State of Vietnam) against the Việt Minh, unlike their success in Vĩnh Yên before, was not decisive. The Việt Minh would attack again shortly afterwards.

== Prelude ==
After suffering a heavy setback at the Battle of Vĩnh Yên, Giáp decided to attack the port of Hải Phòng, the centerpiece of French logistics. Giáp planned to breach the French defenses at Mạo Khê, which was about 20 miles north of the port. He hoped that the fresh 316th Division, supported by diversionary attacks from the 304th and 320th divisions, would be enough to break the French.

Mạo Khê was poorly defended. It was encircled by a series of outposts, with the town itself held by an armored car platoon of the Moroccan Colonial Infantry. The Mạo Khê coal mine was located 1,000 meters (3,300 feet) to the north of the town and was garrisoned by a company of partisans commanded by a Vietnamese lieutenant and three French NCOs. To the east of the town, a company from the 30th Senegalese Composite Battalion guarded a fortified Roman Catholic church. In total, the French had about 400 troops.

== Battle ==
After diversionary thrusts on 23 March, the Việt Minh began to assail Mạo Khê's outposts later in the night. They had carried all major positions by 26 March and prepared for the main attack on the city. At this point, the anticipated communist attack stalled under heavy pressure from French naval forces, which had managed to approach Mạo Khê via a deep channel in the nearby Đà Bắc River. The Việt Minh's losses were about 30 KIAs and 80 WIAs.

De Lattre was uncertain of Giáp's intentions, but he did send the 6th Colonial Parachute Battalion (6e BPC) and some artillery batteries to relieve the beleaguered forces at Mạo Khê. Early in the morning of 27 March, the Việt Minh 209th Regiment of the 312th Division launched a massive attack against the coal mine, whose defenders resisted until French B-26s and Hellcats alleviated the pressure. After exhausting their ammunition, the partisans beat a skillful retreat to Mạo Khê. The Việt Minh's losses were 46 KIAs, 209 WIAs, and 14 MIAs.

At 02:00 on 28 March, the Việt Minh opened up a torrent of artillery and mortar fire against the town. The 36th Regiment of the 308th Division launched a number of mass infantry assaults which were repulsed by well-placed French artillery. The Việt Minh eventually entered the town and a bloody hand-to-hand confrontation began, although the momentum of the attack had petered out. The Vietnamese withdrew later in the morning with 58 KIAs and 137 WIAs.

== Aftermath ==
Casualties had been light for the French and, at around 3,000, heavy for the Việt Minh by French estimates. Vietnamese figures are about 150 KIAs and 426 WIAs. Although the French had been victorious, Giáp's losses were not nearly as bad as at Vĩnh Yên two months previously. Giáp would make another unsuccessful attempt to breach the French lines in late May.

== Sources ==
Setting the Stage in Vietnam
