= Đông Triều (city) =

Former provincial city of the former Quảng Ninh province, Vietnam

- Provincial city (Class-3)
- Đông Triều City; Thành phố Đông Triều
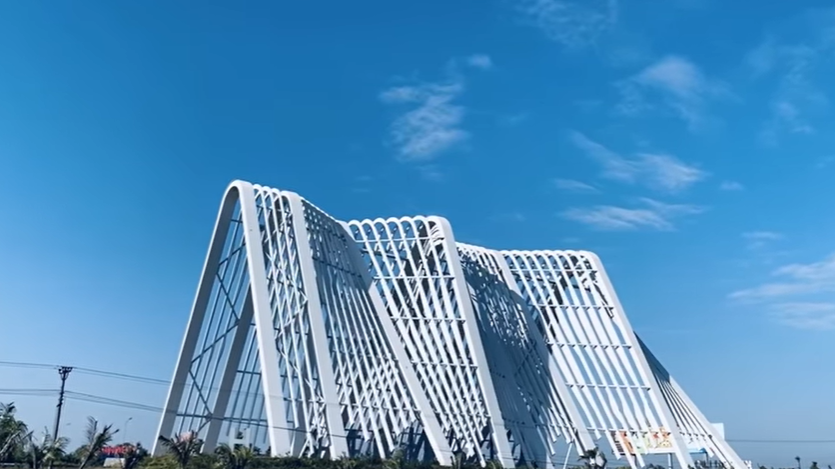
- Quảng Ninh Gate

- Location within Vietnam Location within Asia
- Country: Vietnam
- Region: north-east
- Province: Quảng Ninh
- Founded: 2015
- Capital: Đông Triều ward

Government
  - Chairman of the People's Committee: Nguyễn Văn Ngoãn
  - Chairman of the People's Council: Nguyễn Ngọc Bằng
  - Secretary: Nguyễn Văn Công

Area
  - Provincial city (Class-3): 153.3658 sq mi (397.2155 km^{2})
  - Urban: 19.7899 sq mi (51.2556 km^{2})
- Elevation: 49 ft (15 m)

Population (December 31, 2022)
  - Provincial city (Class-3): 246.290
  - Density: 1,610/sq mi (622/km^{2})
  - Urban: 75,159
  - Urban density: 3,798/sq mi (1,466.3/km^{2})
- Time zone: UTC+7 (UTC + 7)
- Postal code: + 84.331
- Area code: 14
- Website: Thị xã Đông Triều

Đông Triều is a former provincial city of the former Quảng Ninh Province (now Quảng Ninh city) in the north-eastern region of Vietnam. As of 2015 the district had a population of 173,141. The district covers an area of 397.2155 km^{2}. The town capital lies at Đông Triều ward.

== Administrative divisions ==
The city consists of the 10 wards of:

- Đông Triều
- Mạo Khê
- Xuân Sơn
- Hưng Đạo
- Đức Chính
- Kim Sơn
- Tràng An
- Hồng Phong
- Yên Thọ
- Hoàng Quế

and 11 rural communes of:

- Thủy An
- Nguyễn Huệ
- Việt Dân
- Tân Việt
- Bình Dương
- Yên Đức
- Tràng Lương
- Bình Khê
- Hồng Thái Đông
- Hồng Thái Tây
- An Sinh

List of administrative units under Đông Triều town

Name	Area (km^{2})	Population
Ward (10)
Đông Triều	0,77	5.380
Đức Chính	6,28	7.315
Hoàng Quế	14,88	7.377
Hồng Phong	7,38	8.186
Hưng Đạo	8,1	8.611
Kim Sơn	10,45	9.328
Mạo Khê	19,07	39.983
Tràng An	9,53	6.001
Xuân Sơn	6,6	6.805
Yên Thọ	10,21	10.816

Name	Area (km^{2})	Population
Commune (11)
An Sinh	83,12	7.280
Bình Dương	10,08	8.665
Bình Khê	57,76	10.858
Hồng Thái Đông	20,16	8.777
Hồng Thái Tây	19,16	6.742
Nguyễn Huệ	10,83	6.093
Tân Việt	5,55	3.458
Thủy An	7,93	4.354
Tràng Lương	72,3	2.922
Việt Dân	7,22	4.158
Yên Đức	9,36	5.439
