= Mạo Khê =

Mạo Khê Phường Mạo Khê
- Ward
- Interactive map of Mạo Khê
- Coordinates: 21°04′08″N 106°34′58″E
- Country: Vietnam
- City: Quảng Ninh
- Established: June 16, 2025

Area
  - Total: 17.97 sq mi (46.55 km^{2})

Population (2024)
  - Total: 72,012
  - Density: 4,007/sq mi (1,547/km^{2})
- Time zone: UTC+07:00 (Indochina Time)
- Administrative code: 07069

Mạo Khê (Vietnamese: Phường Mạo Khê) is a ward of Quảng Ninh, Vietnam. It is one of the 54 new wards, communes and special zones of the province following the reorganization in 2025.

It is the location of the 1951 "Battle of Mạo Khê" in the First Indochina War.

== History ==
On June 16, 2025, the National Assembly Standing Committee issued Resolution No. 1679/NQ-UBTVQH15 on the arrangement of commune-level administrative units of Nghệ An province in 2025 (effective from June 16, 2025). Accordingly, the entire land area and population of Xuân Sơn, Kim Sơn, Yên Thọ and Mạo Khê wards of the former Đông Triều city will be integrated into a new ward named Mạo Khê (Clause 25, Article 1).
