= Domain of the Crown =

Historical territory in Vietnam

Domain of the Crown Hoàng triều Cương thổ (Vietnamese) Domaine de la Couronne (French) 皇朝疆土
- Collection of autonomous territories of the State of Vietnam (a part of French Indochina until 1954)
- 1950–1955
- Top: National flag Bottom: Imperial standard Coat of arms

- Domain of the Crown in dark green Vietnam in green French Indochina in light green
- Capital: Đà Lạt
- Area transferred
  - 1954: Crown domains in Bắc phần ceded to North Vietnam
- Government
  - Type: Autonomous administrative divisions
- Chief of State
  - 1950–1955: Bảo Đại
- Historical era: Cold War
  - Autonomy granted: 15 April 1950
  - Battle of Điện Biên Phủ: 13 March – 7 May 1954
  - Vietnamese division: 21 July 1954
  - Disestablished: 24 March 1955
- Subdivisions
  - Type: Autonomous territories, provinces, districts, communes
Preceded by
Montagnard country of South Indochina
Mường Autonomous Territory
Thái Autonomous Territory
Mèo Autonomous Territory
Nùng Autonomous Territory
Thổ Autonomous Territory
Succeeded by
Hòa Bình Province
Thái-Mèo Autonomous Region
Việt Bắc Autonomous Region
Hải Ninh Province
Darlac
Đồng Nai Thượng
Kontum
Lâm Viên
Pleiku
- Today part of: Vietnam

The Domain of the Crown (Vietnamese: Hoàng triều Cương thổ; Chữ Hán: 皇朝疆土; French: Domaine de la Couronne; Modern Vietnamese: Đất của vua) was originally the Nguyễn dynasty's geopolitical concept for its protectorates and principalities where the ethnic Kinh did not make up the majority, later it became a type of administrative unit of the State of Vietnam. It was officially established on 15 April 1950. In the areas of the Domain of the Crown, the Chief of State Bảo Đại was still officially (and legally) titled as the "Emperor of the Nguyễn dynasty".

The Domain of the Crown was established to preserve French interests in French Indochina and to limit Vietnamese immigration into predominantly minority areas, halting Vietnamese influence in these regions while preserving the influences of both French colonists and indigenous rulers.

After the 1954 Geneva Conference, the Domain of the Crown lost considerable amounts of territory, as the entirety of Bắc phần was ceded to the Democratic Republic of Vietnam, reducing it only to Tây Nguyên. On 11 March 1955 Prime Minister Ngô Đình Diệm dissolved the Domain of the Crown (officially 24 March) reducing both the power of the Chief of State Bảo Đại and the French directly annexing these areas into the State of Vietnam as the crown regions still in South Vietnam would later become Cao nguyên Trung phần in the Republic of Vietnam.

== Background ==
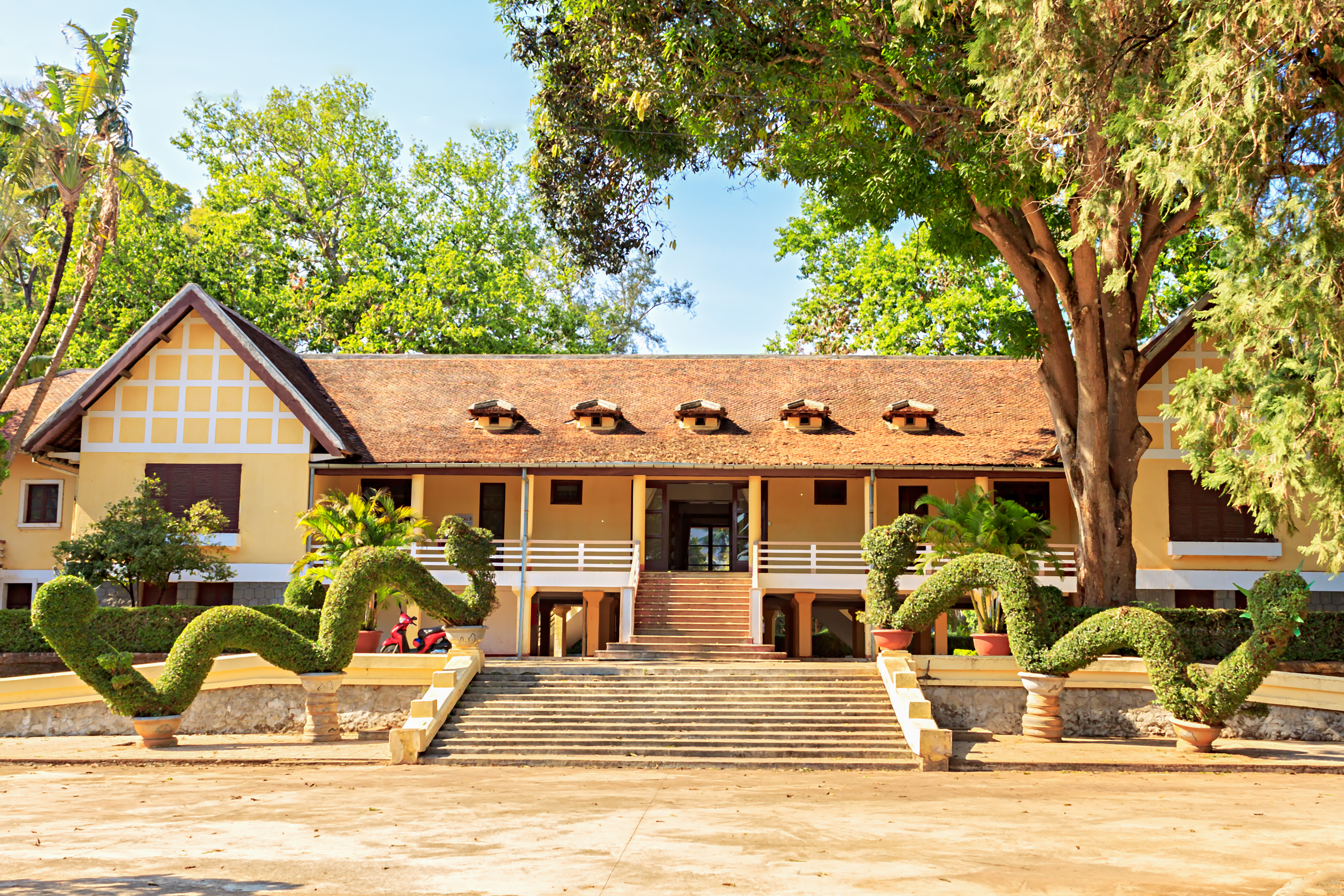
The "Bảo Đại Palace" in Buôn Ma Thuột, one of the residences of the Chief of State located in the Domain of the Crown.

During the Nguyễn dynasty period (1802–1945) ethnic minorities retained a level of autonomy and their tribal societies and principalities were a part of what was considered to be the "Domain of the Crown" as an informal division.

This Domain included the Montagnard territories of Central Vietnam. The Champa Kingdom and the Chams in the lowlands of Central Vietnam were traditional suzerains whom the Montagnards in the highlands acknowledged as their lords, while autonomy was held by the Montagnards. After 1945, concept of "Nam tiến" (the southward expansion of Vietnam) was celebrated by Vietnamese scholars. The Pays Montagnard du Sud-Indochinois (or "Montagnard country of South Indochina") was the name of the Central Highlands from 1946 under French Indochina. Up until French rule, the Central Highlands was almost never entered by the Vietnamese since they viewed it as a savage (Mọi) populated area with fierce animals like tigers, "poisoned water" and "evil malevolent spirits." The Vietnamese expressed interest in the land after the French transformed it into a profitable plantation area to grow crops on, in addition to the natural resources from the forests, minerals and rich earth and realisation of its crucial geographical importance.

Furthermore, the Domain would include areas in Northern Vietnam populated by various ethnic minorities, primarily Tai peoples. Even though the upland Tai had stronger ethnic and cultural ties to Laos, Sip Song Chau Tai was incorporated into the French protectorate of Tonkin—and therefore French Indochina—after the year 1888. This was arranged by the French explorer and colonial representative Auguste Pavie who signed a treaty with Đèo Văn Trị, the White Tai lord of Muang Lay (Lai Châu) on 7 April 1889. Thereby the Sip Song Chau Tai accepted the French overlordship, while the colonial power promised to respect the positions of the Tai lords and their autonomy in internal affairs.

Following the abolition of the Nguyễn dynasty and the subsequent Proclamation of Independence of the Democratic Republic of Vietnam in 1945 the French sought to regain the pre-war status quo in French Indochina after the surrender of Japan and tried reinstalling Bảo Đại. After months of negotiations with French President Vincent Auriol, he finally signed the Élysée Accords on 9 March 1949, which led to the establishment of the State of Vietnam with Bảo Đại as Chief of State. However, the country was still only partially autonomous, with France initially retaining effective control of the army and foreign relations. Bảo Đại himself stated in 1950: "What they call a Bảo Đại solution turned out to be just a French solution... the situation in Indochina is getting worse every day".

== History ==
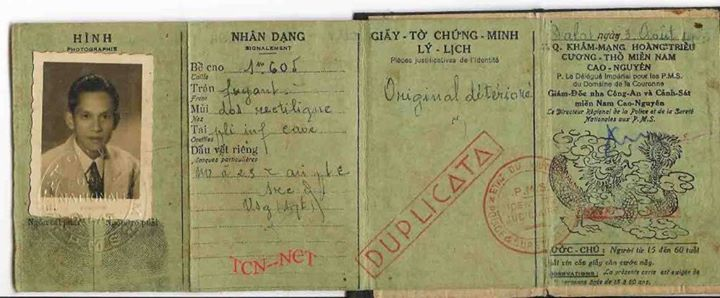
An identity document (Giấy căn-cước) issued to a resident of the Domain of the Crown. These identity documents were separate from the ones issued by other citizens of the State of Vietnam. All inhabitants of the crown domains aged 15 to 60 were required to have this identity document.

The Central Highland tribes were conquered by Franco-Vietnamese forces from 1887 to 1902. In order to meet the demand of the rubber market during the First World War, under industrial brokerage pressures to open up the Central Highlands, the French colonial government permitted establishment of colonial rubber plantations in 1916. By 1941, 42,000 Kinh and 5,100 French colonists had made the area their residence. There was some serious Montagnard revolts against French colonialists. Colonialism in Central Highlands nevertheless was halted during the Second World War, when the fascist Petain regime and its Decoux administration of Indochina attempted to boast the native Montagnards' warrior culture and recruit indigenous loyalism, first to reject Vietnamese nationalist claim to the region, second to circumvent indigenous liberation, third to prevent Japanese access. After the Second World War, worries about rising nationalist movements in Cambodia and Vietnam and Vietminh potential takeover of the highlands prompted France to negotiate and establish several autonomous entities assigned to indigenous minority peoples to retain direct French control under the camouflage of granting independence.

On 30 May 1949, the French delegated the authority to manage the Central Highlands from the Montagnard country of South Indochina to the Provisional Central Government of Vietnam. Chief of State Bảo Đại separated the Central Highlands from the central government and established a special administrative system called the Domain of the Crown within the State of Vietnam as crownlands of Bảo Đại through Dụ số 6/QT/TG on 15 April 1950. The Montagnard country of South Indochina was renamed to the "Crown Domain of the Southern Higlander Country" (Domaine de la couronne du pays montagnards du Sud) or PMS. In the crown areas, Bảo Đại held both the titles of "Chief of State" (國長, Quốc trưởng) and "Emperor" (皇帝, Hoàng Đế). In Central Vietnam (Trung phần) the Domain of the Crown was assigned 5 provinces and in Northern Vietnam (Bắc phần) it received 11.

The leader of the Domain of the Crown was entitled the Khâm mạng Hoàng triều and the first Khâm mạng Hoàng triều was Nguyễn Đệ, who was previously general manager for the Chief of State. Despite this, all actual decisions regarding the administration of Cao nguyên were made by the Commissioner of Annam (Khâm sứ Trung Kỳ, Resident-Superior of Annam).

According to the agreement between French President Vincent Auriol and the State of Vietnam, after the French ceded control over the Montagnard country of South Indochina to the Vietnamese, the autonomous status of the ethnic minorities would be subject to separate regulations and would continue to fall under special protection (statut particulier) from the French Government. Therefore, when promulgating a law, the government of the State of Vietnam must have an agreement from France in order to pass it. The crown domains in the central highlands area continued to be administered through a French special delegate and not a representative of the State of Vietnam.

According to a letter written by the French President Vincent Auriol the areas populated by the ethnic minorities should be seen as "the private property of the Emperor of Annam" rather than belonging to the Vietnamese state. According to the book Cựu hoàng Bảo Đại written by Hoàng Trọng Miên the Domain of the Crown was created by Bảo Đại in response to a lament uttered by his mother Empress Dowager Từ Cung, where he stated: "Well, at some point, my mother and daughter will have no land to dwell in this country!". In his own memoires Bảo Đại wrote that the creation of the Domain of the Crown was suggested to him by Léon Pignon in Paris who argued that the lands of ethnic minorities were never directly administered by the imperial court of the Nguyễn dynasty and could be assigned to the Chief of State in order to help the unification of Vietnam. Bảo Đại claimed that he accepted the proposal because he believed that he could help in the ethnic minority tribes in their development and enjoy the serene environment of the territories.

Dụ số 6/QT/TG also specified Đà Lạt as the capital city of the Domain of the Crown. Đà Lạt was created as special resort city and the French hoped to develop it into "a European-style city in the Orient" that would ease the homesickness of the French colonists. Đà Lạt was ambitiously built with many large architectural projects in the hopes of making it the capital city of French Indochina by the 1940s. The return of Bảo Đại made Đà Lạt change its face as the capital city of Domain of the Crown. On 10 November 1950 Bảo Đại issued Dụ số 4/QT-TG which separated the administration of the city from Lâm Viên Province giving it the status of "independent township" (Thành thị xã độc lập) where the mayor would be directly appointed by the Chief of State of Vietnam. Only two mayors were appointed during the Domain of the Crown period, namely Trần Đình Quế and Cao Minh Hiệu. Đà Lạt was also the headquarters of the Service de documentation extérieure et de contre-espionnage (SDECE) as well as British and American intelligence services such as the CIA during this period and Bảo Đại had to report to the SDECE.

On 21 May 1951, Chief of State Bảo Đại issued Quy chế 16 which was written to promulgate the creation of a “special regulation” designed to provide more Montagnard participation in local affairs in these provinces, all the while these regulations reaffirmed the "eminent rights" of the State of Vietnam. Quy chế 16 contained the following regulations related to highland areas of the Domain of the Crown:

1. The interests of the State of Vietnam should be aligned with interests of the ethnic minorities (Sắc tộc thiểu số).
2. Cao nguyên belongs to the Chief of State.
3. Montagnards need to participate in development of Cao nguyên.
4. The government of the State of Vietnam should respect the tribal system and the culture of the Montagnards.
5. The establishment of an economic council for Cao nguyên (Hội đồng Kinh tế).
6. The establishment of an Upper Court of Customs for Cao nguyên (Tòa án Phong tục Thượng).
7. To guarantee land ownership of the Montagnards.
8. To develop the structure of social services in Cao nguyên, such as healthcare and education.
9. The establishment of a separate military unit for the Montagnards with priority given to serving in and protecting Cao nguyên.

These regulations were heavily criticised by the Vietnamese for giving too much power to the French, especially after an economic council was established that was heavily influenced by French planters working to preserve their interests. Furthermore, the Domain of the Crown was criticised for limiting Kinh immigration and maintaining the French colonial structures and administrators, as the French President Vincent Auriol retained a lot of powers in the domain. In the provinces of Kontum, Pleiku, and Darlac the old French colonial administrators remained in power. In fact, in the central highlands the Khâm mạng was Colonel Pierre Didelot, the husband of Agnès Nguyễn Hữu Hào making him the brother-in-law of empress consort Nam Phương.

After enacting Quy chế 16, Bảo Đại and High Commissioner Léon Pignon attended a ceremony in Buôn Mê Thuột, Đắk Lắk Province, to receive the symbol of the lands of the "Domain of the Crown" and took the oath of the chiefs of the Southern Montagnards. In his book "The Dragon of Vietnam" (Con rồng Việt Nam) written by Bảo Đại as his memoirs, he recorded: "Personally, I am worshiped by them, for the Emperor is the king of the gods who protects their forests and plains".

In the Domain of the Crown all aspects of society were strictly managed. All activities from building houses to the felling trees required a government license to be carried out.

According to records from June 1953 the imperial government of the Domain of the Crown sought to develop the societies of the ethnic minorities into a more modernised state and increase their population through development. While the central government of the State of Vietnam hoped to use the more sparsely populated crown lands to settle people from the overpopulated areas of Central and Northern Vietnam from.

The headquarters of the Chief of State Bảo Đại was situated in a building entitled "Palace I" (Dinh I), this is a palace of 60 hectares created in 1940 using French money and was designed and constructed by Robert Clément Bougery, following its acquisition by Bảo Đại it was renovated.

The effects of this period of history on the Montagnard people was profound. While the central highland Montagnards had to navigate at least one French colonial and two Vietnamese national projects during 9 years of war, this period saw rapid developments in their areas. Both the French colonial authorities and the State of Vietnam promoted efforts to create an educated anti-Việt Minh elite in the central highlands region. During this period hundreds of young Montagnard men from across the region met each other in the classrooms of the Collège Sabbatier in the city of Ban Mê Thuột, Đắk Lắk Province, and these young men studied what became a common upland language, the Rade language. The educated Montagnards from this period would accept administrative positions outside of their native tribal areas, which would develop long-lasting and often unprecedented relationships extending across the region, among which marriages across clan were common.

On 10 August 1954, the special status of the Domain of the Crown within the State of Vietnam was abolished. On 11 March 1955 Prime Minister Ngô Đình Diệm signed Dụ số 21 formally abolishing the Domain of the Crown as a separate entity altogether. Chief of State Bảo Đại accepted the signed Dụ số 21 into law and the leftover areas of the Domain of the Crown were formally annexed into Trung phần.

On 24 March 1955 a ceremony was held in front of Kontum Administrative Court, with the presence of thousands of ethnic minorities where the Chief of State Bảo Đại read the declaration which formally ended the 4 year and 11-month existence of the Domain of the Crown.

After the end of the abolition of the Crown, Ngô Đình Diệm enacted new policies that allowed Kinh people to settle in the region and to freely conduct business there. Furthermore, Ngô abolished many specific regulations dating to the French and Nguyễn dynasty period that limited Kinh interests in Cao nguyên.

== Provinces ==
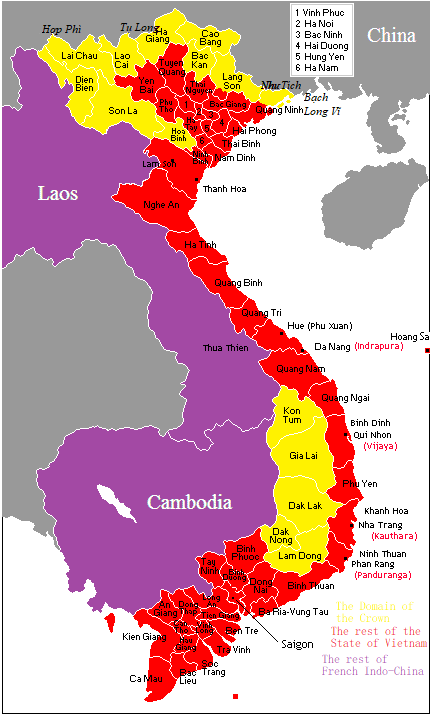
The Domain of the Crown, coloured yellow, within French Indochina before 1954 (note the modern provincial names and boundaries).

The Domain of the Crown contained the following five provinces which were established from the former Montagnard country of South Indochina:

1. Đồng Nai Thượng
2. Lâm Viên
3. Pleiku
4. Darlac
5. Kontum

In Bắc Việt, later Bắc phần, it contained the following provinces:

1. Hòa Bình (Mường Autonomous Territory)
2. Phong Thổ (Thái Autonomous Territory)
3. Lai Châu (Thái Autonomous Territory)
4. Sơn La (Thái Autonomous Territory)
5. Lào Kay (Mèo Autonomous Territory)
6. Hà Giang (Mèo Autonomous Territory)
7. Bắc Kạn (Thổ Autonomous Territory)
8. Cao Bằng (Thổ Autonomous Territory)
9. Lạng Sơn (Thổ Autonomous Territory)
10. Hải Ninh (Nùng Autonomous Territory)
11. Móng Cái (Nùng Autonomous Territory)
