= Chinese Nùng =

Ethnic Chinese group in Vietnam

The flag of the Nùng Autonomous Territory.

The ethnic Chinese Nùng (Vietnamese: người Hoa Nùng, Hán-Nôm: 𠊛華農; Chinese: 華裔儂族) are a group of Han Chinese living in Vietnam. The Chinese Nùng composed 72% to 78% of the population of the Nùng Autonomous Territory of Hải Ninh (1947–1954) located in Vietnam's Northeast, covering part of the present-day Quảng Ninh province.

The Chinese Nùng's name originated from the fact that the vast majority of them were farmers (nồng nhằn 農人 in Cantonese). They are largely unrelated to the Tai-speaking Nùng people. After the Treaty of Tientsin, the French refused to recognize this group as Hoa (Chinese) due to political and territorial issues on Vietnam's northern frontier border, therefore the French classified them as Nùng based on their main occupation. The most widely used languages of the Chinese Nùng are Hakka Chinese and Yue Chinese since they descended from people speaking these languages.

== Overview ==
The Nùng community in Hải Ninh was formed from various groups of migrants who came from southern China in different waves, including the Tsín-Lẩu, Ngái, Sán-Dìu, and Hac-Cá. An early French document further distinguishes between the Pủn Tì Hạc Nhần (indigenous Hakka), the Hạc Cá Nhần, also known as Lừu Mằn Nhần (drifting Hakka), and the Ngái Nhần, among others. The Tsín-Lẩu and Ngái-Lẩu groups are thought to have arrived earlier, while the drifting Hakka came later.

In Hải Ninh province, the majority of the Nùng observed ancestor worship alongside folk religion, while 20% were Buddhists and 10% were Catholics.

Following the 1954 partition of Vietnam, about 50,000 Nùng led by Colonel Vòng A Sáng (黃亞生) fled as refugees, joining the one million North Vietnamese who fled South. The Nùng were resettled primarily in Bình Thuận province, where a new district named Hải Ninh, after their former homeland, was established. In South Vietnam, they were considered part of the Hải Phòng Chinese, named after the port city in North Vietnam from which they had departed. During the Vietnam War, Nùng soldiers were known for their loyalty to the US Special Forces. They often served as bodyguards to the Special Forces and were regarded as a good source of security for green berets who were recruiting and training locals.

== Languages ==
The Nùng speak Hakka and Yue Chinese as their first languages. A Vietnamese-based transcription of Nùng was first adopted in 1948, with two recognized varieties: âm Ngái-Lẩu and âm Tsín-Lẩu. Below are some example words:

| âm Tsín-lẩu | âm Ngái-lẩu | English |
|---|---|---|
| thìu kảu | thiẻo kều | dog |
| plát mả | plịt má | horse |
| thìu mếu | thiẻo meo | cat |
| chiec kái | chạc kế | chicken |
| sủi ngàu | sùi ngểu | water buffalo |
| mảy | mì | rice |
| Zịt Nàm nhàn | Zát Nảm nhỉn | Vietnamese |
| chiống chỉ | chóng chì | paper |

The following are the Hanzi text and romanization of a Nùng folk song, as attested in a 1974 publication; it tells of a husband returning home after a very long absence, unaware that the woman washing clothes by the river is his wife:

Chinese characters

一 條 江 水 清 攸 攸
問 姑 洗 衣 眼 淚 流
不 識 家 婆 相 打 閙
不 識 嬸 嫂 結 怨 仇

一 條 江 水 清 漣 漣
我 夫 上 京 十 八 年
今 日 洗 衣 明 日 乾
想 著 我 夫 眼 淚 流

Nùng transcription

Dắt thìu coóng sủi xíng dàu dàu
Mằn cú sảy í ngản lùi làu
Bắt sấc cá pồ sướng tả nàu
Bắt sấc xẩm xẩu kit ín sàu

Dắt thìu coóng sủi hín lìn lìn
Ngổ phú sưởng kênh sặp bát nìn
Cắm nhặt xảy í mìng nhặt ca
Xưởng chược ngổ phú ngản lùi làu

English translation

One stretch of river water, clear and flowing on.
Asking the lady washing clothes: why do tears flow from your eyes?
Is it that your mother-in-law has fought and quarreled with you?
Or is it because your aunt-in-law has stirred a bitter feud?

One stretch of river water, clear and rippling.
My husband went to the capital eighteen years ago.
Today I wash the clothes, by tomorrow they are dry,
Thinking of my husband, tears flow from my eyes.

== Diaspora ==
A flag used by the Chinese Nùng diaspora to represent their people. Notice the usage of the coat of arms of the Nùng Autonomous Territory in its centre.

After the Fall of Saigon in 1975 and during the Indochina refugee crisis, many of the Nùng fled Vietnam as boat people political refugees to Hong Kong and Malaysia's refugee camps. While some moved to mainland China, many others were resettled in the USA, Canada, France, Australia, and Taiwan, among other countries.

== See also ==
- Ngái people
