= Hoàng Quế =

Coordinates: 21.0261°N 106.6278°E

- Ward
- Interactive map of Hoàng Quế
- Country: Vietnam
- City: Quảng Ninh
- Time zone: UTC+07:00 (Indochina Time)

Hoàng Quế is a ward (phường) of Quảng Ninh, Vietnam.

The village is about 60 km to the west of Hạ Long Bay on the way from and to Hanoi. Hoàng Quế Village is a typical Vietnamese agricultural village in terms of culture and traditions. The village is surrounded by mountains which are mirrored in the Kinh Thầy River. Also, similar to other typical traditional Vietnamese villages in the North of Vietnam, Hoàng Quế Village has golden rice fields in the harvest time, many lakes and ponds and colorful gardens, especially the ranges of areca trees in the sunshine.

Hoàng Quế has many historical monuments and an ancient pagoda named Canh Huong which contains cultural and historical values dated back to Ly and Tran dynasty. In the village, all the alley roads have stone walls. The community-based tourism project has been developed in Hoàng Quế village since 2011. Visitors can visit Hoàng Quế village to see water puppet show.
