= Ngái people =

Hakka-speaking communities mainly in Vietnam

Người Ngái 𠊎人
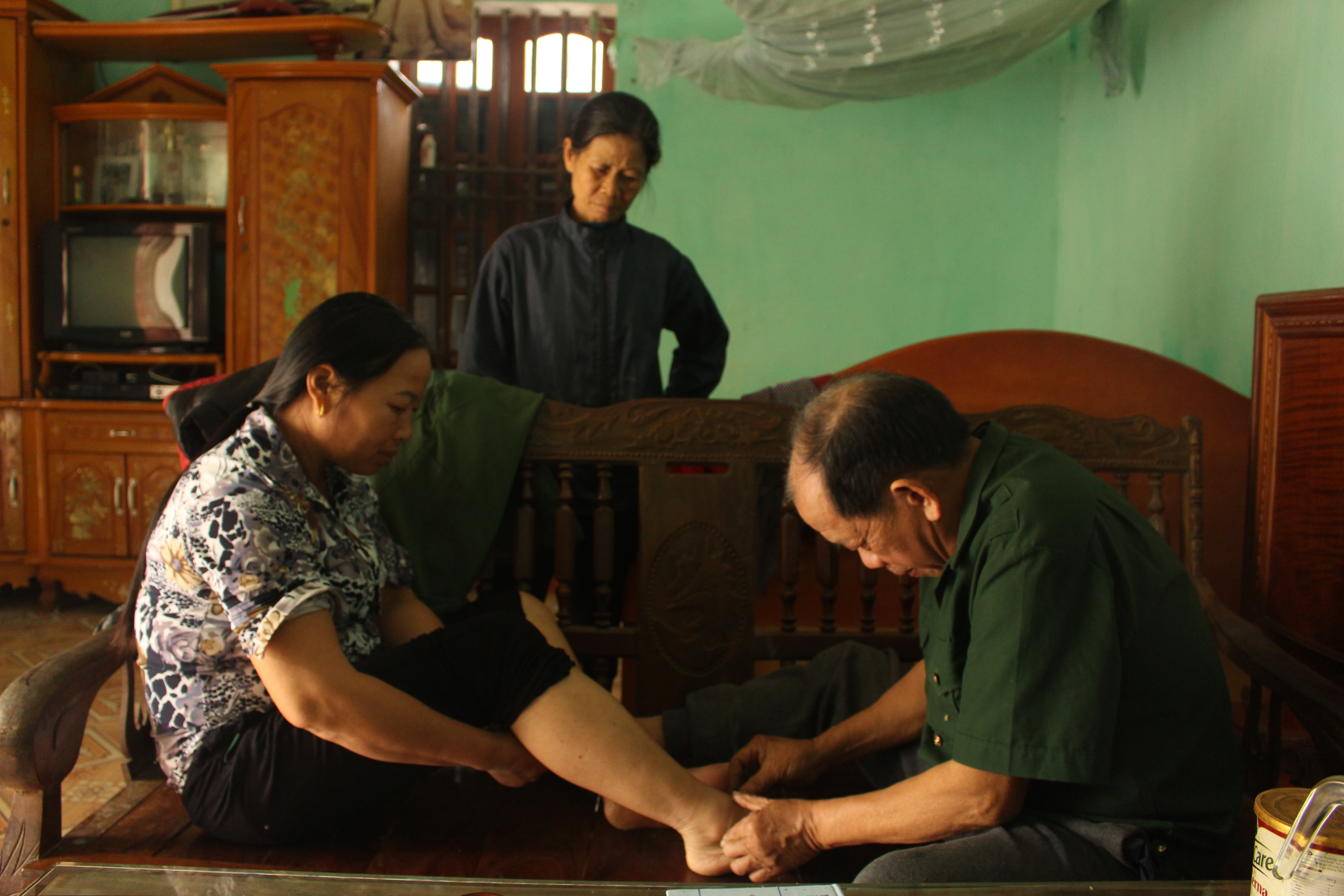
- Ngái people doing moxibustion in Thái Nguyên Province

Total population
- 4,841 (1999); 1,035 (2009); 1,649 (2019)

Regions with significant populations
- Vietnam: Quảng Ninh, Thái Nguyên, Hải Phòng

Languages
- Hakka, Cantonese, Vietnamese

Religion
- Folk religion, Mahayana Buddhism

Related ethnic groups
- Hakka, Tanka, Hoa, Hoa Nùng

The Ngái (Vietnamese: người Ngái; chữ Nôm: 𠊛𠊎) are an ethnic group found in Vietnam, largely descended from the Hakka people of southern China. The Vietnamese government classifies the Ngai distinctly from the Hoa people when considering ethnic minority groups. The term "Ngai" comes from the Hakka Chinese first person pronoun "ngai" (𠊎, "I / me"), and some Ngai use the endonym "San Ngai" (山𠊎, "mountain [-dwelling] Ngai").

== Overview ==
The Ngái people speak Hakka, a Sinitic language, but are classified separately from the Hoa or urban "ethnic Chinese" by the Vietnamese government as they have been living in the modern-day lands of Vietnam for centuries.

The Ngái population was 4,841 in 1999 but down only 1,035 in 2009 and up to 1,649 in 2019. Due to issues related to ethnic registration, the officially recorded number of Ngái people is very small. The total number of Hakka speakers in Vietnam is estimated to be around 150,000 to nearly 200,000, and most of them are classified as Hoa instead.

== See also ==
- Chinese Nùng
- San Diu people, a Cantonese speaking community in northern Vietnam
