= Đông Triều =

- Đông Triều Heroes Monument

- Emblem
- Interactive map of Đông Triều
- Coordinates: 21.080523286249583°N 106.5157926772742°E
- Country: Vietnam
- City: Quảng Ninh
- Region: Red River Delta
- Established: 16 June 2025

Area
  - Total: 40.42 km^{2} (15.61 sq mi)

Population (2025)
  - Total: 43,712
  - Density: 1,081/km^{2} (2,800/sq mi)

Đông Triều is a ward of Quảng Ninh, Vietnam. The ward inherited its name from the former Đông Triều City in Quảng Ninh Province.

== History ==
The area of present-day Đông Triều Ward formerly belonged to Đông Triều City, formerly Quảng Ninh Province.

The Đông Triều area is considered the first settlement of the Trần clan. It was later granted by King Trần Thái Tông to his elder brother Trần Liễu as a ấp thang mộc.

On 11 March 2015, Đông Triều Ward was established on the basis of the entire area and population of Đông Triều Township. Đông Triều Ward had a natural area of 76.51 hectares and a population of 5,186.

On 28 September 2024, the Standing Committee of the National Assembly of Vietnam adopted Resolution No. 1199/NQ-UBTVQH15 on the reorganization of district-level and commune-level administrative units in Quảng Ninh Province for the 2023–2025 period. Accordingly, the entirety of Đông Triều Ward was merged into Đức Chính Ward. The former Đông Triều Ward was dissolved.

On 16 June 2025:

- The National Assembly adopted Resolution No. 203/2025/QH15 amending and supplementing several articles of the Constitution of the Socialist Republic of Vietnam. The resolution took effect on 16 June 2025. Under the resolution, district-level administrative units throughout Vietnam ceased to operate from 1 July 2025.
- The Standing Committee of the National Assembly of Vietnam adopted Resolution No. 1679/NQ-UBTVQH15 on the reorganization of commune-level administrative units in Quảng Ninh Province in 2025. The resolution took effect on 16 June 2025. Accordingly, the entire area and population of Thủy An, Hưng Đạo, and Hồng Phong wards, Nguyễn Huệ Commune, and part of Đức Chính Ward were merged to form a new ward named Đông Triều.

On 24 August 2026, the National Assembly adopted Resolution No. 36/2026/QH16 establishing Quảng Ninh City on the basis of the entire natural area and population of Quảng Ninh Province. The resolution took effect on 1 September 2026. Since then, Đông Triều Ward has been part of Quảng Ninh City.
