= Montagnard country of South Indochina =

Autonomous territory of French Indochina

Pays Montagnard du Sud Indochinois Xứ Thượng Nam Đông Dương
- Autonomous territory of Annam (1946–1948), the Provisional Central Government of Vietnam (1948–1949), and the State of Vietnam (1949–1950) within French Indochina.
- 1946–1950
- Flag

- Capital: Đà Lạt (1946–1948); Ban Mê Thuột (1948–1950)
  - Type: Autonomous territory
- Historical era: First Indochina War (Cold War)
  - Autonomy granted: 27 May 1946
  - Absorbed into Bảo Đại's crown domains: 15 April 1950
- Subdivisions
  - Type: Provinces, districts, communes
Preceded by
Darlac
Đồng Nai Thượng
Kontum
Lang Biang
Pleiku
Succeeded by
Domain of the Crown
- Today part of: Vietnam

The Montagnard country of South Indochina (French: Pays Montagnard du Sud Indochinois; Vietnamese: Xứ Thượng Nam Đông Dương), sometimes abbreviated as PMSI, was an autonomous territory of French Indochina, and an autonomous federation within the French Union, created in 1946 following the French reconquest of the Central Highlands from the Democratic Republic of Vietnam during the First Indochina War. The territory was supposed to be an autonomous homeland of the Montagnard people within French Indochina, but existed mainly to serve French colonial interests in the region.

The territory was absorbed into the Domain of the Crown, with the issue of Dụ số 6 in 1950, a collection of territories where Kinh people were a minority that was nominally directly controlled by Chief of State Bảo Đại.

== History ==
=== Background ===
During the Nguyễn dynasty period (1802–1945) ethnic minorities retained a level of autonomy and their tribal societies and principalities were a part of what was considered to be the "Domain of the Crown" as an informal division.

The Champa Kingdom and the Chams in the lowlands of Central Vietnam were traditional suzerains whom the Montagnards in the highlands acknowledged as their lords, while autonomy was held by the Montagnards.

During the late 19th century, as the French moved to consolidate colonial authorities over Eastern Indochina, the French started paying more attention to the strategic location of the Annamese highlands, this was especially done in an attempt to roll back Siamese influence.

After having consolidated their colonial power in the Union of Indochina, the French subsequently focused there more on controlling the highland population as a method of controlling anti-French insurrections rising up among the lowland Kinh people. French administrators in the highland regions, such as Léopold Sabatier, contributed to the persistence of a separate non-Vietnamese identity for the Montagnards by opposing the immigration of Kinh people into these regions. French administrator Sabatier sought to emphasise a separate ethnic identity for the Montagnards differentiating them from the Annamese, and even created a customary law code for the Degar people.

A combination of French colonial administrators, military officers, and ethnographers contributed to a process of "ethnicisation" to the centr Montagnard people, such as by classifying them into four major groups of "tribes". These included the Bahnar, Sedang, Rhadé, and Jarai by the 1930s. During this period the French authorities started claiming that the historically diverse tribes were growing into a united culture, which in the eyes of many Frenchmen was defined by its "historic" opposition to everything that can be seen as "Annamese" (Vietnamese). After 1945, concept of "Nam tiến" (the southward expansion of Vietnam) was celebrated by Vietnamese scholars.

"to save this race, to disentangle it from all harmful foreign influences through a direct administration, and to tie these tribes to us … These proud peoples with their spirit of independence will provide us with elite troops, (serve) as safety valves in case of internal insurgency, and (act) as powerful combat units in case of external war."

— Unattributed French quote mentioned in "PAYS MONTAGNARDS DU SUD (PMS)" by Goscha Christopher (Université du Québec à Montréal).

The Pays Montagnard du Sud-Indochinois (or "Montagnard country of South Indochina") was the name of the Central Highlands from 1946 under French Indochina. Up until French rule, the Central Highlands was almost never entered by the Vietnamese since they viewed it as a savage (Mọi) populated area with fierce animals like tigers, "poisoned water" and "evil malevolent spirits." The Vietnamese expressed interest in the land after the French transformed it into a profitable plantation area to grow crops on, in addition to the natural resources from the forests, minerals and rich earth and realisation of its crucial geographical importance.

=== Autonomous highlands ===
After World War II, a new situation arose in the French protectorates of Annam and Tonkin and the French colony of Cochinchina as the rise of the Việt Minh and other Vietnamese independence movements changed the balance of power in French Indochina at a disadvantage for the French. French strategists returning to rebuild colonial Indochina following the surrender of Japan hoped to build a new strategy for regaining their status upon the pre-existing French central highlands Montagnard policy, this time the French were extending it to various other ethnic minority areas in the Indochinese highlands, especially among the Tai and the Nùng peoples in northwestern Vietnam. High Commissioner Georges Thierry d'Argenlieu sought to neutralise the situation by approving the establishment of the Autonomous Republic of Cochinchina in Southern Vietnam on 1 June 1946 and then the Montagnard country of South Indochina in the central highlands region on 27 May 1946. The French used the tactic of divide-and-conquer to fragment the various national independence movements that existed in Vietnam, using specially-recruited Montagnard divisions and troops to fight against the independence movements and dividing Vietnam into smaller regions. The French had hoped that they could use the highland Montagnard peoples to fight against the Việt Minh which primarily operated from the lowlands.

The Montagnard country of South Indochina was decreed to be a "Special Administrative Circumscription" and was administered by a French delegate.

The Montagnard country of South Indochina was created out of the five provinces of Darlac, Đồng Nai Thượng, Kontum, Lang Biang, and Pleiku. It was under direct control of the French colonial authorities reporting to the French Union, its initial capital city was located in Đà Lạt but was later relocated to Ban Mê Thuột in 1948.

During the Fontainebleau Agreements the officials of the Democratic Republic of Vietnam protested against both the creation of the Autonomous Republic of Cochinchina and the Montagnard country of South Indochina seeing it as disuniting the Vietnamese homeland. One French spokesman countered the territorial claims of the Democratic Republic of Vietnam to the Montagnard country of South Indochina by saying "Neither geographically, historically nor ethnically, can the highlands be considered a part of Vietnam." This was then responded to by delegates of the Democratic Republic of Vietnam reminding the French of Alsace-Lorraine. On 21 June 1946 the French military was ordered to retake the highland provinces from Việt Minh control below the 16th parallel north.

Colonel Jacques Massu proposed a plan to let retired French military veterans create plantations in the Montagnard country of South Indochina, which was approved by High Commissioner Georges Thierry d'Argenlieu. This plan hoped to both maintain French colonial interests in the region and help nation build the Montagnards with an identity distinct from that of Vietnam, but the results of this plan were only a limited success. Seeing as the Chinese Communist Party was successful in 1949 and established the People's Republic of China forcing the Nationalist government to retreat to Taiwan (see: Loss of China) the French felt more pressure to work together with the pro-French Vietnamese government to fight the Communist Việt Minh.

On May 30, 1949, the French delegated the authority to manage the Central Highlands from the Montagnard country of South Indochina to the Provisional Central Government of Vietnam. Chief of State Bảo Đại separated the Central Highlands from the central government and established a special administrative system called the Domain of the Crown within the State of Vietnam as crownlands of Bảo Đại through Dụ số 6/QT/TG on 15 April 1950. In this area, Bảo Đại held both the titles of "Chief of State" (國長, Quốc trưởng) and "Emperor" (皇帝, Hoàng Đế). In Central Vietnam (Trung phần) the Domain of the Crown was assigned the 5 provinces that formerly made up the Montagnard country of South Indochina, while in Northern Vietnam (Bắc phần) it received an additional 11 provinces.

=== Aftermath ===
Following the incorporation of the Montagnard country of South Indochina into the Domain of the Crown it became the "Crown Domain of the Southern Higlander Country" (French: Domaine de la couronne du pays montagnards du Sud), or PMS, and the French government maintained that the Vietnamese government should respect the “free evolution of these populations in relation to their traditions and customs” of the central highland Montagnard peoples. In reality this meant that the French maintained some level of control over the area despite it nominally being in the hands of the State of Vietnam government.

== See also ==
- Domain of the Crown
- Kingdom of Sedang
- Persecution of the Montagnard in Vietnam
- Thủy Xá and Hỏa Xá
