= State of Vietnam =

1949–1954 associated state of French Union, 1954–1955 independent state

State of Vietnam Quốc-gia Việt-Nam (Vietnamese) État du Viêt-Nam (French)
- 1949–1955
- National flag Coat of arms (1954–1955)
- Motto: Dân vi quý "The people are the most important"
- Anthem: Thanh niên Hành Khúc "The March of Youths"
- Grand Seal of the Chief of State 保大國長

- Status: Associated state in the French Union (until 1954); Independent state (from 1954)
- Capital: Saigon; 10°48′N 106°39′E
- Official languages: Vietnamese, French
- Religion: Folk religions Confucianism; Buddhism; Taoism; Catholicism; Caodaism; Hoahaoism; Evangelicalism
- Demonyms: Vietnamese, Vietnamian
- Government: Unitary constitutional semi-monarchy
- Chief of State
  - 1949–1955: Bảo Đại
- Prime Minister
  - 1949–1950: Bảo Đại
  - 1950: Nguyễn Phan Long
  - 1950–1952: Trần Văn Hữu
  - 1952–1953: Nguyễn Văn Tâm
  - 1954: Bửu Lộc
  - 1954–1955: Ngô Đình Diệm
- Legislature: National Advisory Council (1949-1954); National Assembly (1954-1955)
- Historical era: Cold War
  - Élysée Accords: 8 March 1949
  - State formation: 14 June 1949
  - Matignon Treaty: 4 June 1954
  - Partition: 21 July 1954
  - Republic founded: 26 October 1955
- Currency: piastre đồng (from 1953)
Preceded by	Succeeded by
Provisional Central Government of Vietnam	North Vietnam; South Vietnam
- Today part of: Vietnam

The State of Vietnam (Vietnamese: Quốc gia Việt Nam; chữ Hán: 國家越南; French: État du Viêt-Nam) was a state in Southeast Asia that existed from 1949 until 1955, initially as an associated state in the French Union and later as a fully independent state (from June 1954). The state claimed authority over all of Vietnam during the First Indochina War and administered urban areas with large populations, while much of the remote territory was controlled by the Democratic Republic of Vietnam.

The State of Vietnam was formed in 1949 within the framework of the French Union as a compromise between Vietnamese nationalists and the French, in opposition to the communists. It gained international recognition in 1950 and aligned politically with the Western Bloc. Former emperor Bảo Đại became Chief of State. Following the 1954 Geneva Accords between the communist Viet Minh and the French, the State of Vietnam lost its foothold in the northern half of the country. Ngô Đình Diệm was appointed prime minister the same year and—after having ousted Bảo Đại in 1955—became president of the Republic of Vietnam.

== History ==
=== Vietnam after World War II ===
The 16th parallel was established by the Allies on August 2, 1945, following the Potsdam Conference, dividing the former French Indochina into two military zones: Chinese Nationalist forces occupied the North, and British forces the South, to disarm Japanese troops. The communist-led Viet Minh launched the August Revolution to seek control in Vietnam, and Ho Chi Minh declared the independence of the Democratic Republic of Vietnam (DRV).

Beginning in August 1945, the Viet Minh sought to consolidate power by terrorizing and purging rival Vietnamese nationalist groups and Trotskyist activists. On September 23, the British supported a French coup de force that overthrew the DRV government in Saigon and attempted to reinstate French control over southern Indochina. In 1946, the Franco-Chinese and Ho–Sainteny Agreements enabled French forces to replace the Chinese north of the 16th parallel and facilitated a coexistence between the DRV and the French that strengthened the Viet Minh while undermining the nationalists. That summer, the Viet Minh colluded with French forces to eliminate nationalists, targeted for their ardent anti-colonialism.

With most of the nationalist partisans defeated, and negotiations broken down, tensions between the Viet Minh and French authorities erupted into full-scale war in December 1946, a conflict which became entwined with the Cold War. Surviving nationalist partisans and politico-religious groups rallied behind the exiled Bảo Đại to reopen negotiations with France in opposition to communist domination.

On June 5, 1948, the Halong Bay Agreements (Accords de la baie d’Along) allowed the foundation of a unified Vietnamese government replacing the governments of Tonkin (North Vietnam) and Annam (Middle Vietnam) associated to France within the French Union. The Associated States of Indochina then also included the neighboring Kingdom of Laos and Kingdom of Cambodia. Cochinchina (South Vietnam), however, had a different status, both as a colony and as an autonomous republic, and its reunification with the rest of Vietnam had to be approved by its local assembly, and then by the French National Assembly. During the transitional period, a Provisional Central Government of Vietnam was proclaimed: Nguyễn Văn Xuân, until then head of the Provisional Government of South Vietnam (as Cochinchina had been known since 1947), became its president, while Bảo Đại waited for a complete reunification to take office.

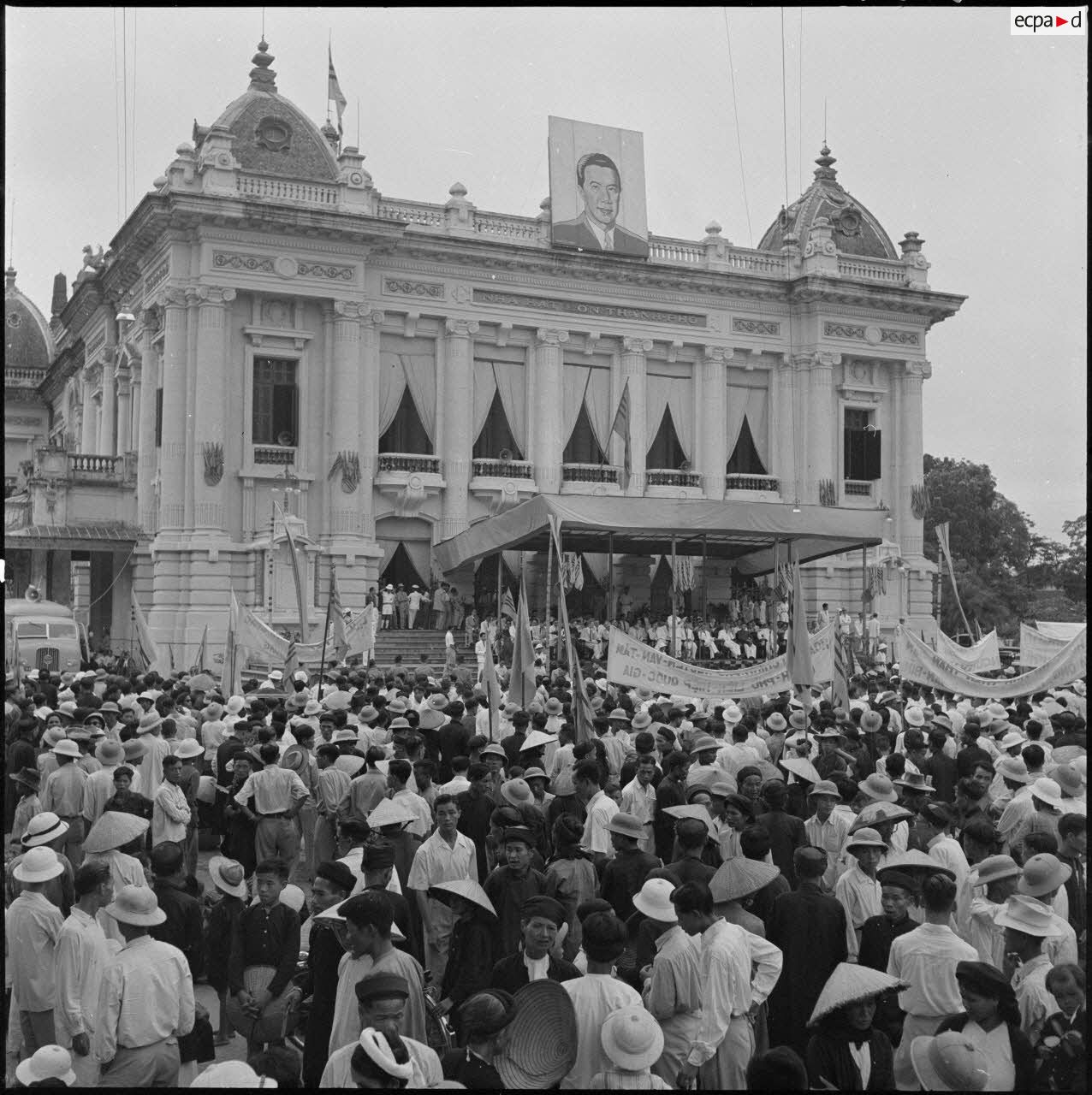
A crowd gathers in Hanoi for the presentation of a new government

Map of contested areas in Indochina, late 1950. The Associated States of Indochina are shown in white.

=== Associated State (1949–1954) ===
On May 20, 1949, the French National Assembly approved the reunification of Cochinchina with the rest of Vietnam. From Saigon, Bảo Đại officially brought the Élysée Accords into effect on June 14. The first government of the State of Vietnam (SVN) was formed on July 1 and officially proclaimed the next day. From 1949 to 1954, the State of Vietnam had partial autonomy from France as an associated state within the French Union.

Bảo Đại and Hồ Chí Minh competed for international and domestic recognition as the legitimate authority over Vietnam. While the State of Vietnam aligned with the anticommunist Western Bloc, the French exploited it to extend their colonial presence and to bolster their standing within NATO. The State of Vietnam received its strongest support from the United States, while Hồ's DRV was backed by the People's Republic of China and the Soviet Union (since 1950).

Following the onset of full-scale war between the Viet Minh and France in December 1946, there emerged nationalists who pursued the quest for a ‘Third Force’ that would be both anticommunist and anticolonialist. This stance led them to maintain an uneasy neutrality in the conflict, and they were at times labeled as attentistes, including Ngô Đình Diệm and certain Đại Việt politicians. With the internationalization of the war in 1950, many of these figures ultimately stepped off the fence and entered the political fray.

Roughly 60% of Vietnamese territory was under the DRV control in 1952. However, most delta and urban areas with large populations were brought under the control of the French and the SVN. As the communist-led Viet Minh became increasingly radicalized, it provoked frustration and disillusionment. Consequently, numerous people left its maquis and returned to the cities in a widespread process known in Vietnamese as dinh tê. Among these defectors were intellectuals, teachers, landlords, administrators, soldiers, civil servants, and even cadres, several of whom came to support the State of Vietnam.

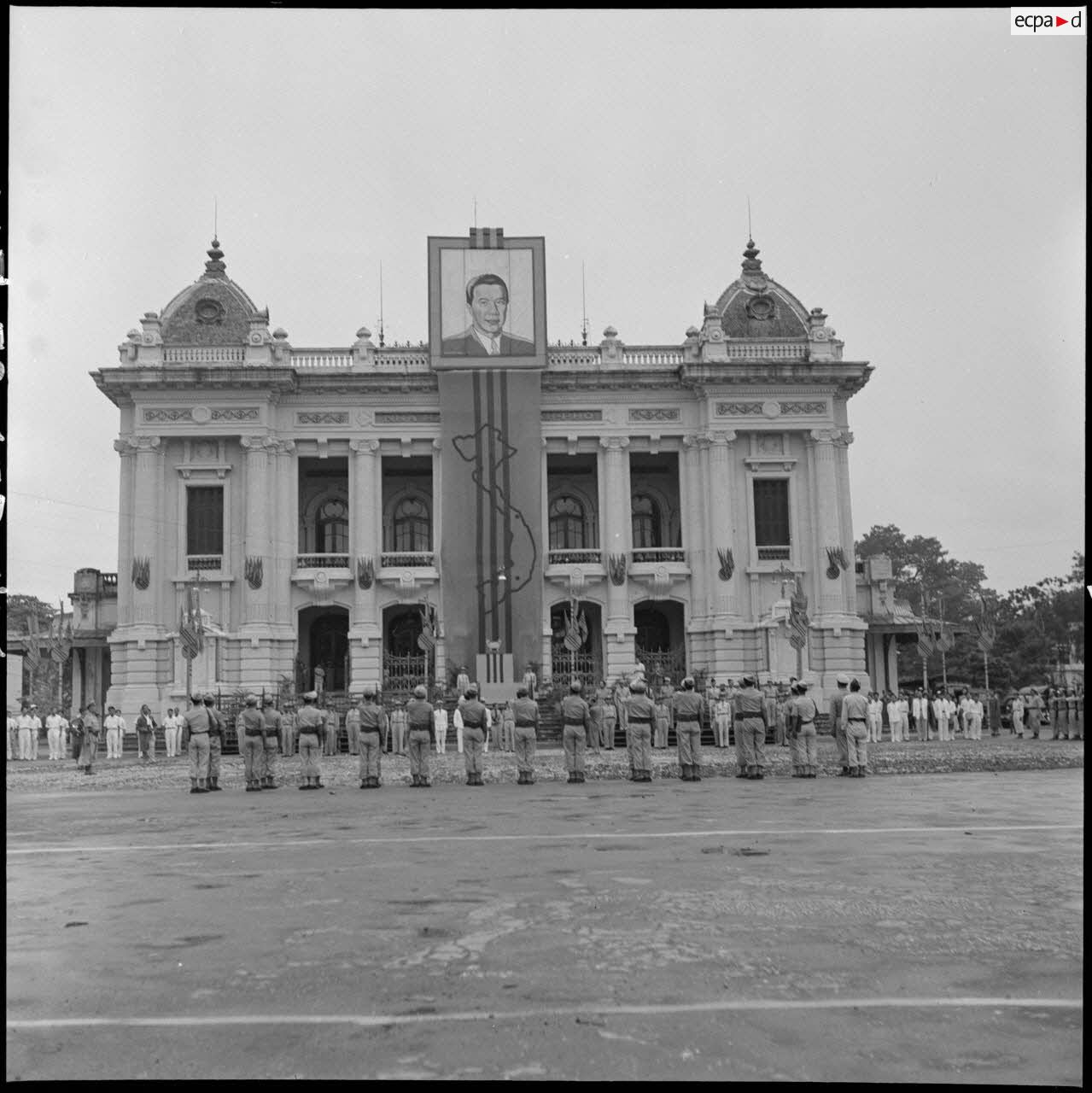
Commissioning ceremony in Hanoi, 1952

Vietnamese anti-communist nationalists were briefly split over the question of accommodation with the SVN. Five major groups opted to work with Bảo Đại's government in order to continue the struggle for independence, assist France in its war against the communist-led Viet Minh, and strengthen their own political and military standing. Known collectively as the 'Big Five' (cinq grands), these groups were the Cao Đài, the Hòa Hảo, the Bình Xuyên, the northern Catholics, and the northern Đại Việt Party. Although these accommodationist groups agreed in principle to cooperate with the SVN, most initially resisted full incorporation into Bảo Đại's administration. Like their earlier relationship with the DRV, they sought to preserve a high degree of autonomy from central authority. The southern "sects" (Cao Đài, Hòa Hảo, Bình Xuyên) and northern Catholics established semi-independent territories that functioned as quasi-states or fiefdoms, supported by their own community welfare systems or parallel economic networks. In contrast, the Đại Việt Party pursued influence through civilian political appointments within the SVN government rather than through military subsidies. The two Catholic Vicariates of Phát Diệm–Bùi Chu, safe havens for anticommunist nationalists in the north, were the last to integrate into the SVN.

The year 1953 marked a new phase in anticommunist nationalism, as accommodationists and attentistes reunited during the piastre devaluation crisis, triggered by France's unilateral lower of the franc–piastre exchange rate. Through successive congresses, accommodationists joined the attentistes in demanding immediate and total independence, though key issues remained, including how to transition to a democratic system. The State of Vietnam was not merely a colonial construct, but a fragmented and negotiated state in which sovereignty was unevenly exercised by colonial authorities, local political actors, and religious self-governing entities. Its state transformation was an act of bricolage, cobbled together from layered legacies of the past and evolving contemporary dynamics. The Matignon Treaty on 4 June 1954 was seen as granting Vietnam independence from France. The prominent nationalist Ngo Dinh Diem, who by now no longer believed that attentisme was a viable policy, was appointed by Bảo Đại in June 1954 to lead the Vietnamese government. With the full support of Bảo Đại, Diệm committed himself to rapidly establishing a truly independent state, and formally withdrew the State of Vietnam from the French Union on July 20, 1954.

=== Partition (1954–55) ===
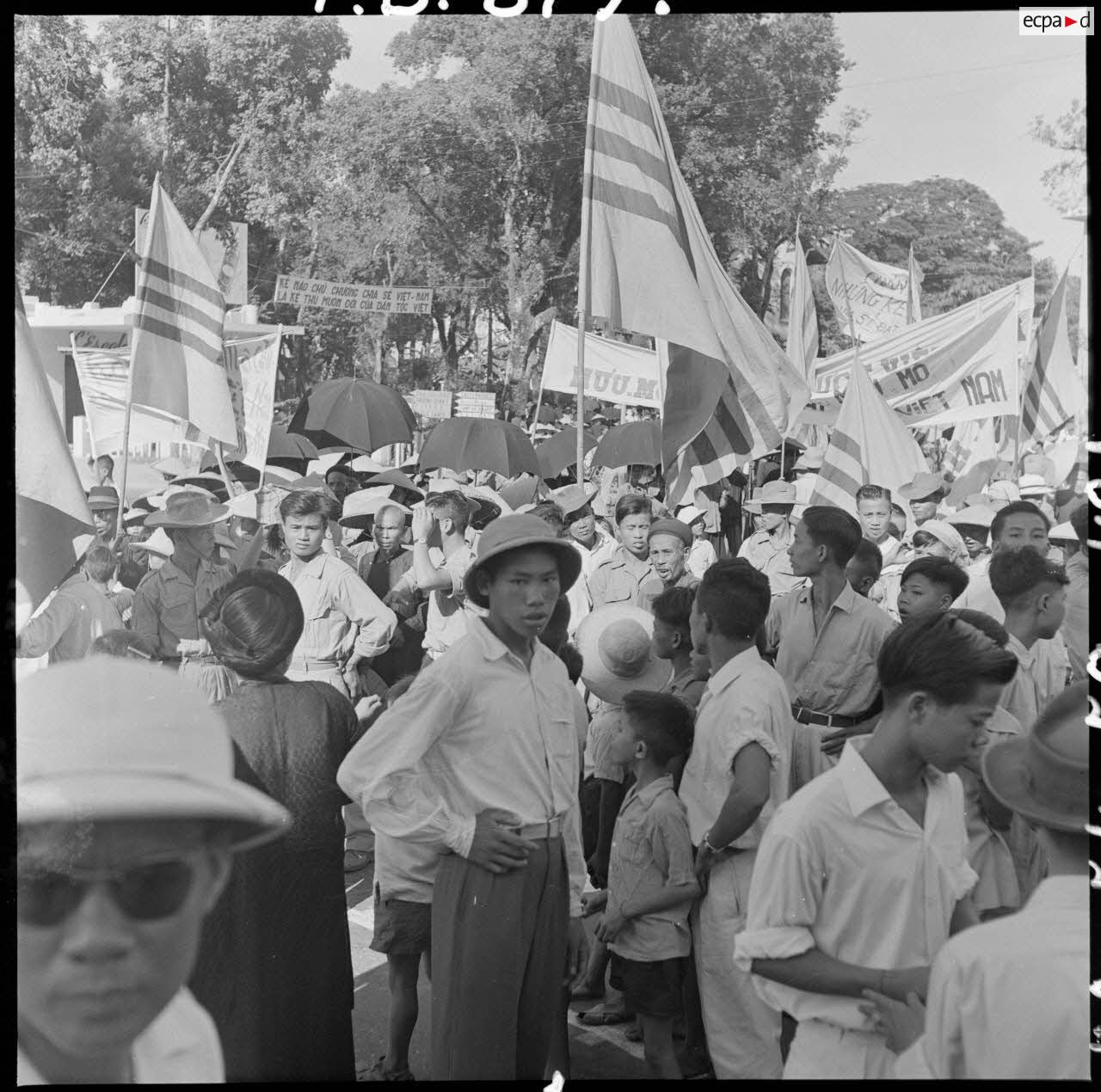
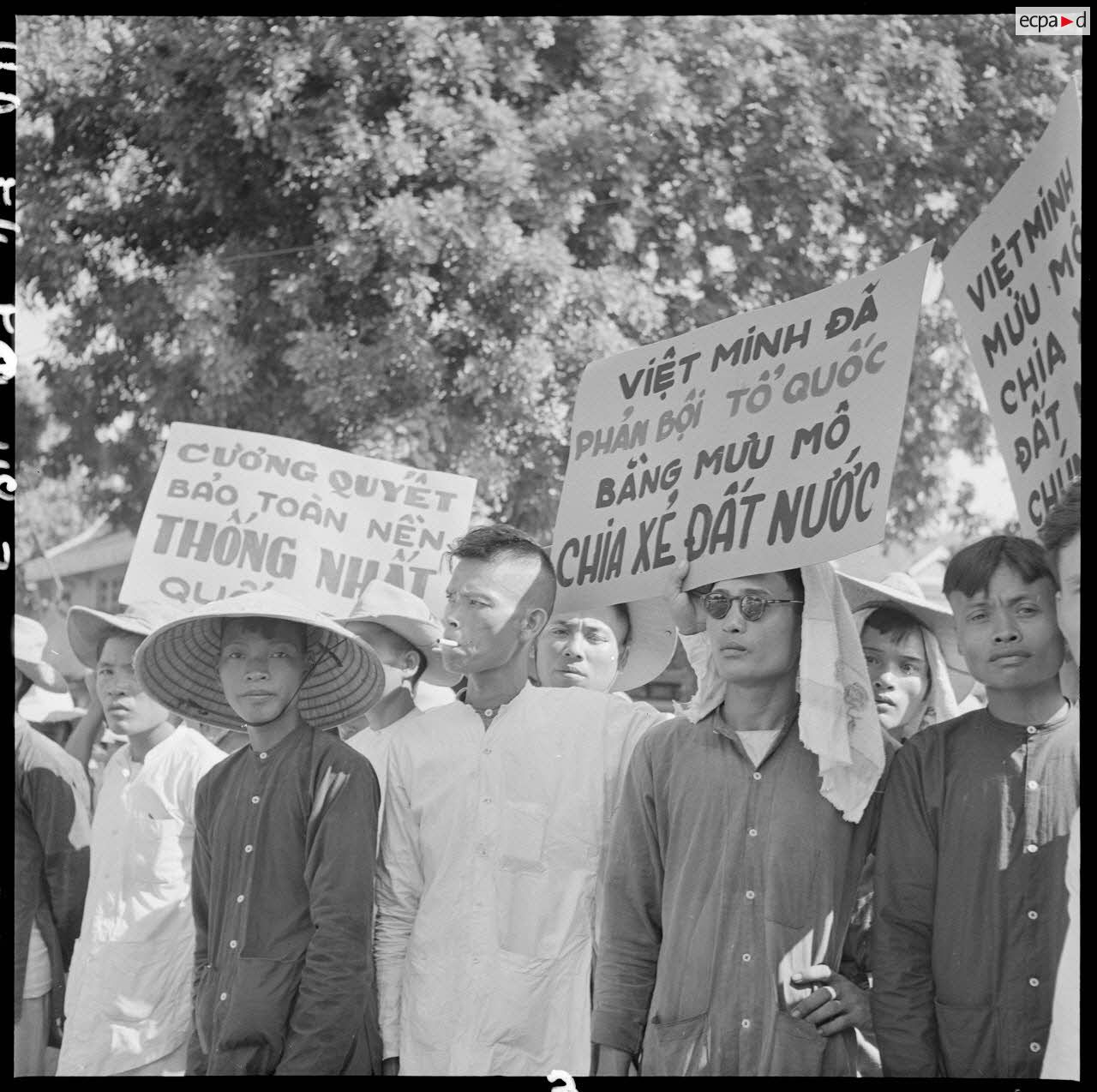
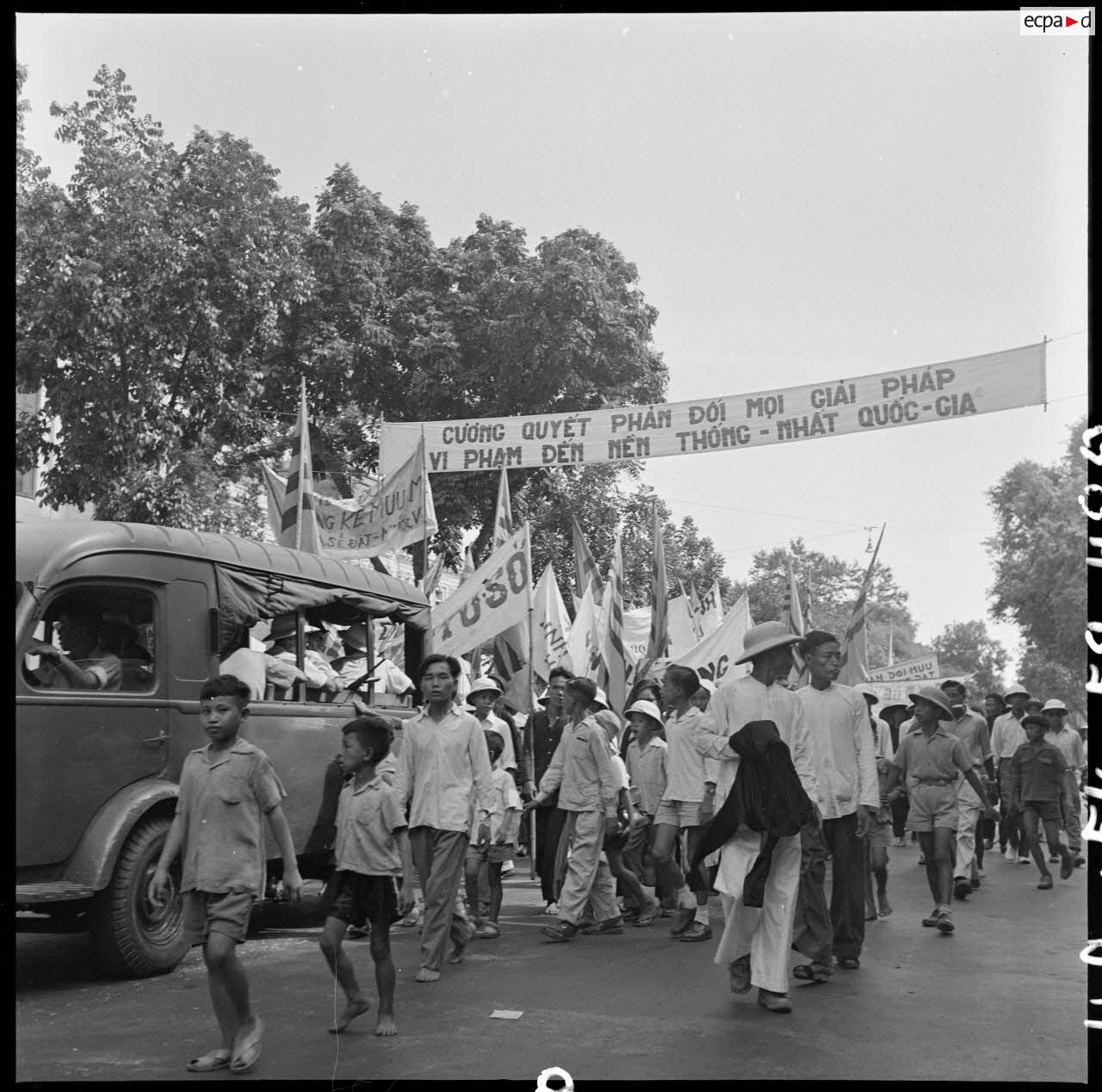
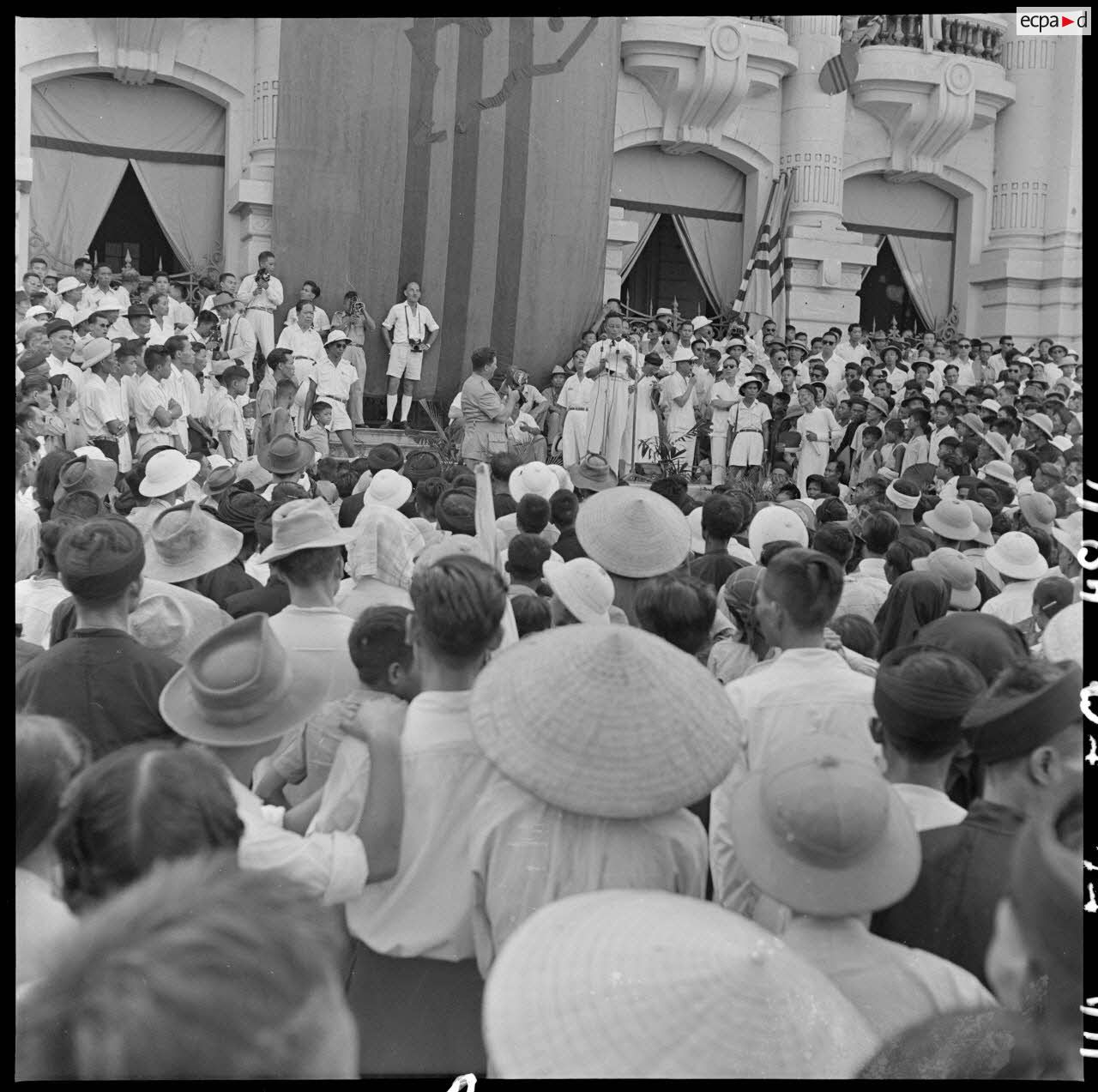
Demonstration in Hanoi against the Viet Minh's partition proposal. Banners read: "The Viet Minh have betrayed the fatherland with their scheme to partition the country", "Firmly oppose all solutions that violate national unity".

The Geneva Accords, signed between the French and the Viet Minh on 21 July 1954, ended the Indochina War by establishing a temporary division of Vietnam at the 17th parallel, with the DRV in the North and the State of Vietnam in the South. Communist forces entered Hanoi on 10 October 1954, replacing the French Union forces that were withdrawing South. During the 300-day period of relocation, around 120,000 Viet Minh personnel moved North. Meanwhile, at least 500,000 Catholics, about 200,000 Buddhists, and tens of thousands from minority groups moved South, many via Operation Passage to Freedom.

The State of Vietnam and the United States were firmly opposed to the final settlement at Geneva and the partition of Vietnam. In July 1955, Prime Minister Ngo Dinh Diem announced in a broadcast that South Vietnam would not participate in the elections specified in the Geneva Accords, as they had not signed the agreement and therefore were not bound by it. In December 1955, Diệm's South Vietnam terminated its existing economic and financial agreements with France and withdrew its representatives from the French Union Assembly.

== Politics ==
=== Provisional Central Government of Vietnam ===
On May 27, 1948, Nguyễn Văn Xuân, then President of the Republic of Cochinchina, became President of the Provisional Central Government of Vietnam (Thủ tướng lâm thời) following the merging of the government of Cochin China and Vietnam in what is sometimes referred as "Pre-Vietnam".

=== State of Vietnam ===
On June 14, 1949, Bảo Đại was appointed Chief of State (Quốc trưởng) of the State of Vietnam; he was concurrently Prime Minister for a short while (Kiêm nhiệm Thủ tướng).

On October 26, 1955, the Republic of Vietnam was established and Ngô Đình Diệm became the first President of the Republic.

=== Leaders ===
	Name	Took office	Left office	Title
	Nguyễn Văn Xuân	May 23, 1948	July 1, 1949	President of the Provisional Central Government of Vietnam
1	Bảo Đại	July 1, 1949	January 21, 1950	Prime Minister; remained Chief of State throughout
2	Nguyễn Phan Long	January 21, 1950	April 27, 1950	Prime Minister
3	Trần Văn Hữu	May 6, 1950	June 3, 1952	Prime Minister
4	Nguyễn Văn Tâm	June 23, 1952	December 7, 1953	Prime Minister
5	Bửu Lộc	January 11, 1954	June 26, 1954	Prime Minister
6	Ngô Đình Diệm	June 26, 1954	October 26, 1955	Prime Minister

=== 1955 referendum, Republic of Vietnam ===
In South Vietnam, a referendum was scheduled for 23 October 1955 to determine the future direction of the south, in which the people would choose Diệm or Bảo Đại as the leader of South Vietnam. During the election, Diệm's brother Ngô Đình Nhu and the Personalist Labor Revolutionary Party (commonly known as "Cần Lao Party") supplied Diệm's electoral base in organizing and supervising the elections, especially the propaganda campaign for destroying Bảo Đại's reputation. Supporters of Bảo Đại were not allowed to campaign, and were physically attacked by Nhu's workers. Official results showed 98.2 per cent of voters favoured Diệm, an implausibly high result that was condemned as fraudulent. The total number of votes far exceeded the number of registered voters by over 380,000, further evidence that the referendum was heavily rigged. For example, only 450,000 voters were registered in Saigon, but 605,025 were said to have voted for Diệm. On 26 October, Diệm proclaimed the Republic of Vietnam—widely known as South Vietnam—whose reformed army, with American assistance, pursued the conflict with North Vietnam; the Viet Cong replaced the Viet Minh, in the Vietnam War.

== Military ==
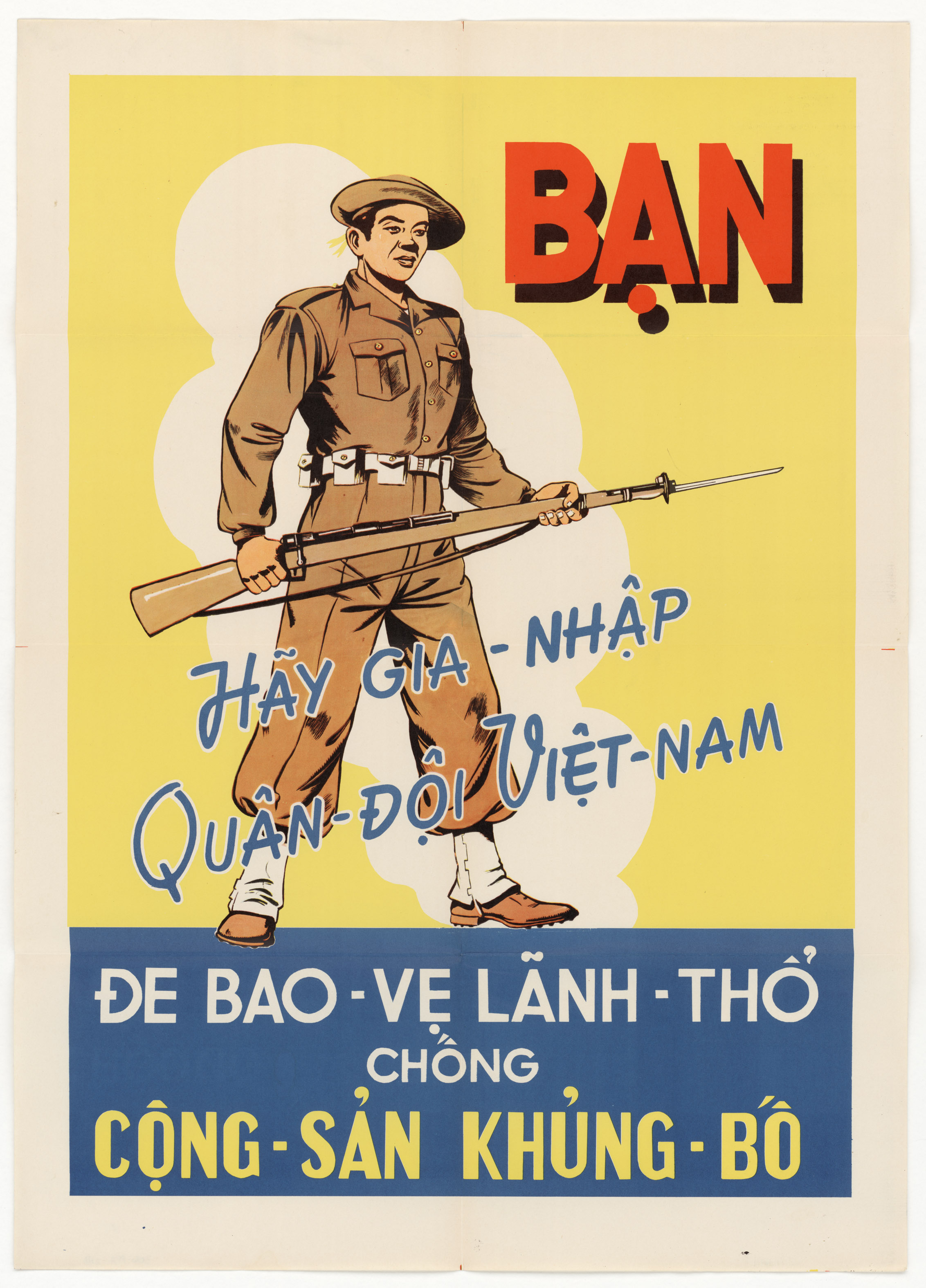
Army recruitment poster against communism.

Vietnamese National Army

Following the signing of the 1949 Élysée Accords in Paris, Bảo Đại was able to create a National Army for defense purposes. A Franco-Vietnamese military agreement signed on 30 December 1949 began negotiations on task-sharing, command, deployment, and funding. A second special agreement of 8 December 1950 set new rules and officially created the Vietnamese National Army. It fought under the State of Vietnam's banner and leadership and was commanded by General Nguyễn Văn Hinh.

== Economy ==
=== Currency ===
The currency used within the French Union was the French Indochinese piastre. Notes were issued and managed by the "Issue Institute of the States of Cambodia, Laos and Vietnam" (Institut d’Emission des Etats du Cambodge, du Laos et du Viêt-Nam). In 1953, Vietnam introduced its own currency.

== Foreign relations ==
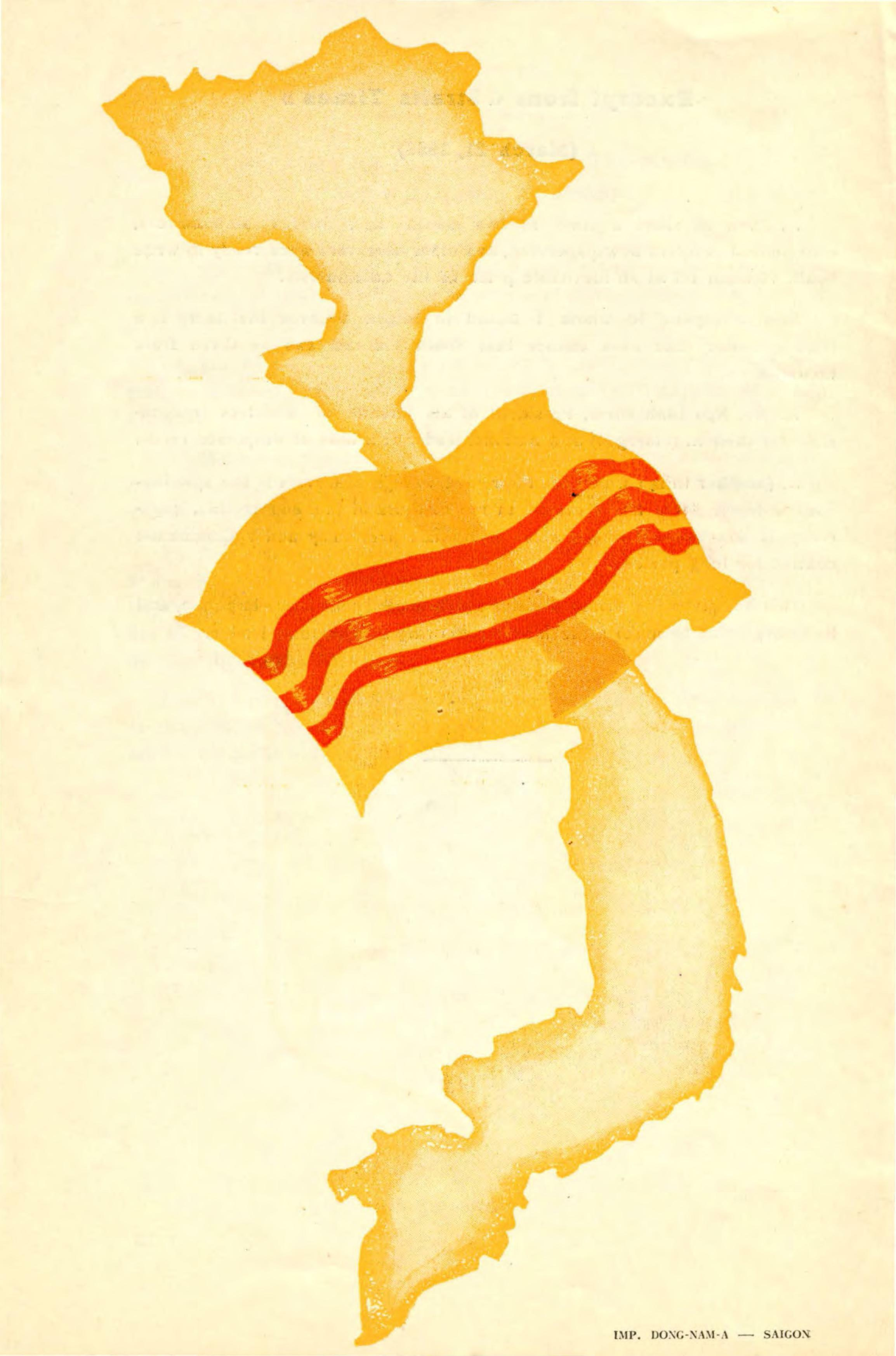
Flag of the State of Vietnam on map, from a 1955 book

By 1950, 34 countries recognized the State of Vietnam:

- United Kingdom, United States (February 7, 1950)
- Belgium, Australia (February 8, 1950)
- Luxembourg, New Zealand (February 9, 1950)
- Greece (February 12, 1950)
- Italy (February 18, 1950)
- Jordan (February 20, 1950)
- Honduras (February 25, 1950)
- Brazil (February 27, 1950)
- Thailand (February 28, 1950)
- Republic of Korea, Spain (March 3, 1950)
- Ecuador, Peru (March 10, 1950)
- Holy See, South Africa, Venezuela (March 13, 1950)
- Bolivia, Costa Rica (March 15, 1950)
- Cuba (March 16, 1950)
- Netherlands (April 12, 1950)
- Paraguay (April 13, 1950)
- Colombia (April 29, 1950)
- Argentina (May 4, 1950)
- Chile, Haiti, Liberia, Nicaragua
- Panama, El Salvador, Philippines, Canada

=== Membership in international organizations ===
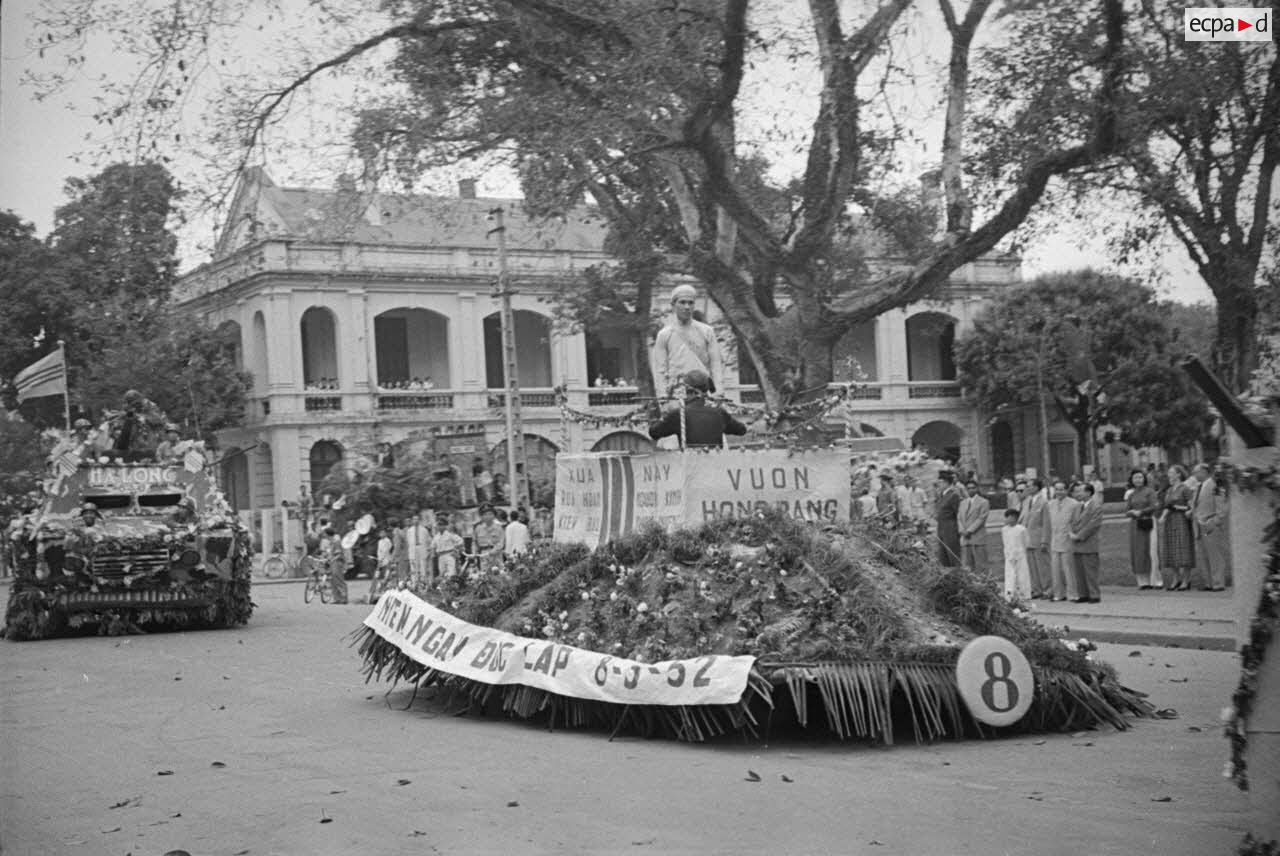
Reenactment of the presentation of the sacred sword to Lê Lợi. Parade in Hanoi 1952, commemorating the Élysée Accords.

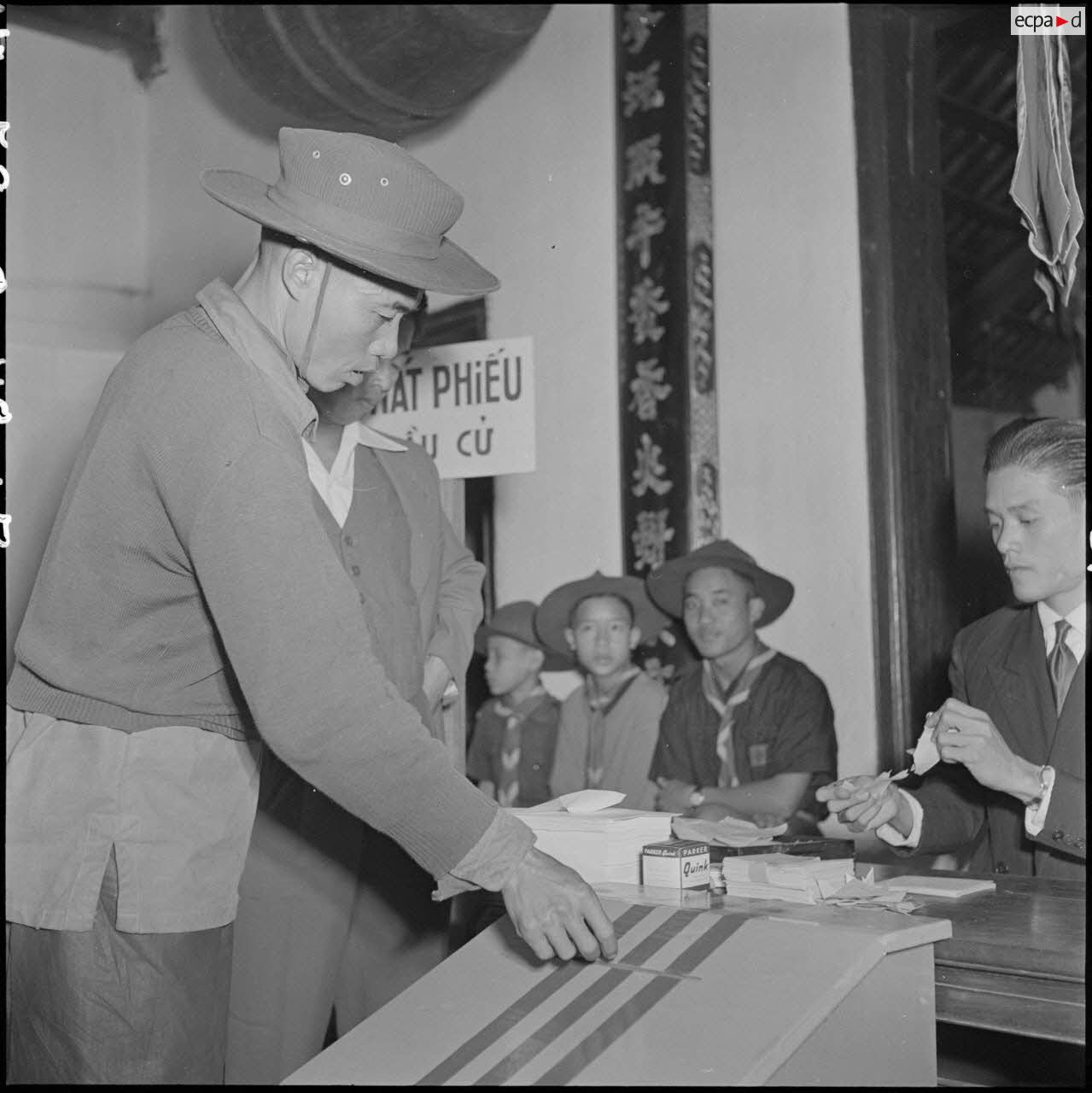
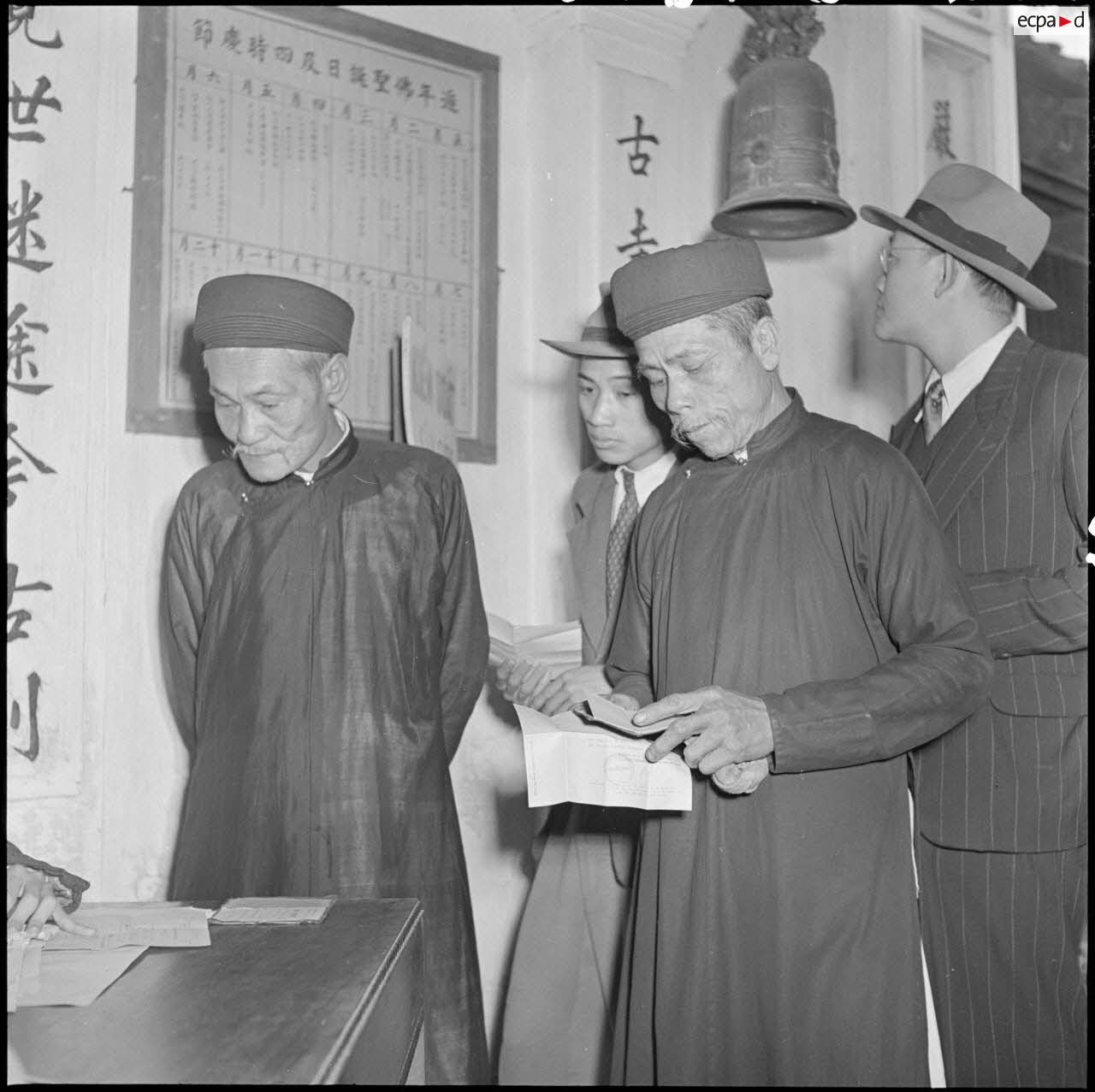
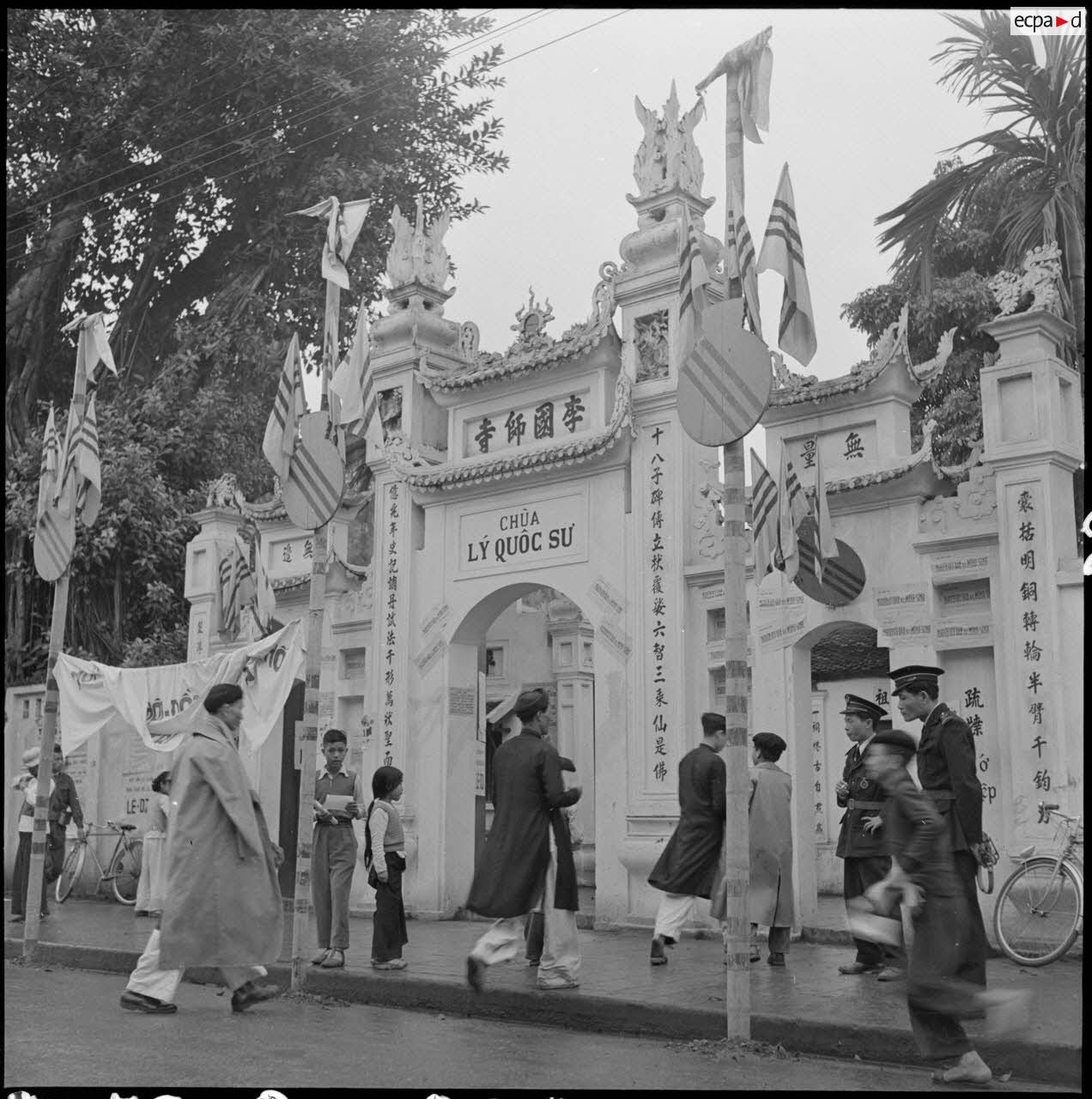
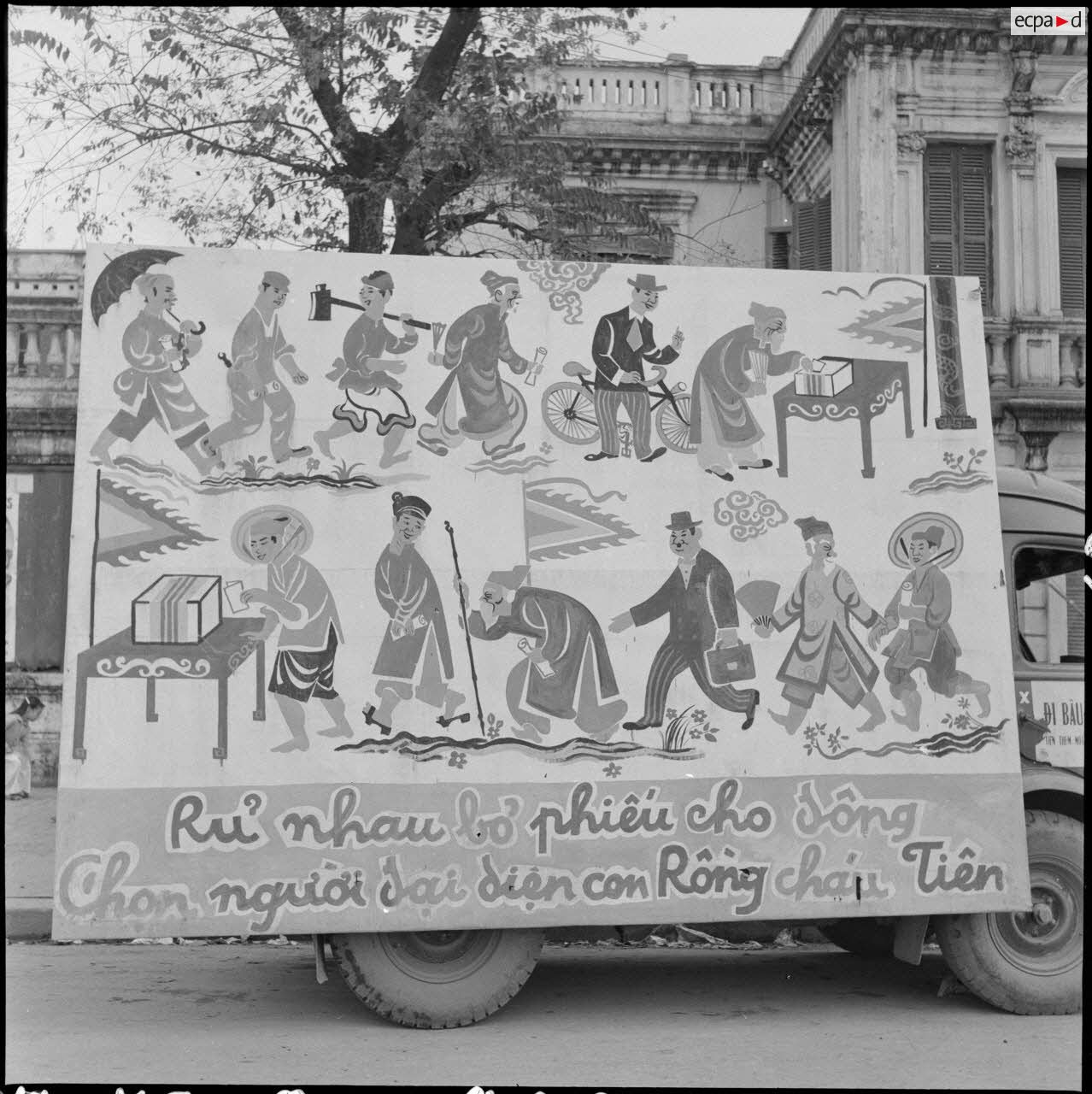
Municipal election in Hanoi 1953.

On 21 October 1949, the United Nations Economic Commission for Asia and the Far East, having considered the applications of both the State of Vietnam and the Democratic Republic of Vietnam, accepted the SVN as an associate member. In 1952, following a veto by the Soviet Union, the United Nations General Assembly adopted a resolution affirming that the State of Vietnam was a peace-loving state and eligible for admission to the United Nations. As of 1952, the State of Vietnam was a member of the following organizations:

- Economic Commission for Asia and the Far East
- World Health Organization
- International Labour Organization
- United Nations Food and Agriculture Organization
- United Nations Educational, Scientific and Cultural Organization
- International Telecommunication Union
- Universal Postal Union
- International Office of Epizootics

== Administrative divisions ==
=== Three principal regions ===
Following the creation of the State of Vietnam and the establishment of its government, the Chief of State Bảo Đại signed the two ordinances related to the administration and local governance of the State of Vietnam, namely Ordinance No. 1 ("Organisation and Operation of civil authorities in Vietnam") and Ordinance No. 2 ("Statutes of Government office"). These ordinances divided the State of Vietnam into three principal administrative regions, namely Bắc Phần (former Tonkin), Trung Phần (former Annam), and Nam Phần (former Cochinchina), the local government of each administrative region was headed by a Thủ hiến (Governour). Since 1948, the three regions had also been referred to as Bắc Phần, Trung Phần, and Nam Phần.

On 4 August 1954 the government of the State of Vietnam enacted Ordinance No. 21 which abolished the autonomous status of the three regions and abolished the post of regional governour, replacing them with central government representatives in all parts of its territory.

=== Domain of the Crown ===
The Domain of the Crown ( Vietnamese: Hoàng triều Cương thổ / 皇朝疆土; French: Domaine de la Couronne) was originally the Nguyễn dynasty's geopolitical concept for its protectorates and principalities where the Kinh ethnic group didn't make up the majority, later it became a type of administrative unit of the State of Vietnam. It was officially established on 15 April 1950 and dissolved on 11 March 1955. In the areas of the Domain of the Crown Chief of State Bảo Đại was still officially (and legally) titled as the "Emperor of the Nguyễn dynasty".

The Domain of the Crown contained the following five provinces established from the former Montagnard country of South Indochina:

1. Đồng Nai Thượng
2. Lâm Viên
3. Pleiku
4. Darlac
5. Kontum

In Bắc phần it contained the following provinces:

1. Hòa Bình (Mường Autonomous Territory)
2. Phong Thổ (Thái Autonomous Territory)
3. Lai Châu (Thái Autonomous Territory)
4. Sơn La (Thái Autonomous Territory)
5. Lào Kay (Mèo Autonomous Territory)
6. Hà Giang (Mèo Autonomous Territory)
7. Bắc Kạn (Thổ Autonomous Territory)
8. Cao Bằng (Thổ Autonomous Territory)
9. Lạng Sơn (Thổ Autonomous Territory)
10. Hải Ninh (Nùng Autonomous Territory)
11. Móng Cái (Nùng Autonomous Territory)

== See also ==
- Vietnamese nationalism
- Cold War in Asia
- History of Vietnam

== Bibliography ==
- Asselin, Pierre (2024). Vietnam's American War: A New History. Cambridge University Press. ISBN 9781009229302. Archived from the original on 2025-05-30.
- Dommen, Arthur J. (2001). The Indochinese Experience of the French and the Americans: Nationalism and Communism in Cambodia, Laos, and Vietnam. Indiana University Press. ISBN 9780253109255.
- Goscha, Christopher (2016). Vietnam: A New History. Basic Books. ISBN 9780465094370. Archived from the original on 2025-06-30.
- Holcombe, Alec (2020). Mass Mobilization in the Democratic Republic of Vietnam, 1945–1960. University of Hawaiʻi Press. ISBN 9780824884475. JSTOR j.ctv105bb0z. Archived from the original on 2022-02-12.
- Kort, Michael G. (2017). The Vietnam War Reexamined. Cambridge University Press. ISBN 9781107110199.
- Marr, David G. (2013). Vietnam: State, War, and Revolution (1945–1946). University of California Press. ISBN 9780520954977. Archived from the original on 2025-07-08.
- Tran, Nu-Anh (2022). Disunion: Anticommunist Nationalism and the Making of the Republic of Vietnam. University of Hawaiʻi Press. ISBN 9780824887865. Archived from the original on 2022-05-19.
- Reilly, Brett (2018). The Origins of the Vietnamese Civil War and the State of Vietnam (PhD). University of Wisconsin–Madison. Archived from the original on 2025-06-11.
- Ninh, Xuân Thao (2019). L'État du Viêt-Nam dans ses rapports avec la France (1949–1955): une autre voie pour l'indépendance du Viêt-Nam (PhD). Université Bordeaux Montaigne.
