= Móng Cái (disambiguation) =

Móng Cái is a place name in northern Vietnam. This name has been used for many administrative units throughout history. Currently, Móng Cái refers to three wards in Quảng Ninh city, numbered from 1 to 3.

- Móng Cái 1: ward of Quảng Ninh city
- Móng Cái 2: ward of Quảng Ninh city
- Móng Cái 3: ward of Quảng Ninh city
- Móng Cái: former provincial city of the former Quảng Ninh province.

== Other ==
- Móng Cái pigs breed originates from Móng Cái, Quảng Ninh.
