= Cao Xanh =

Ward in Quảng Ninh city, Vietnam

- Ward
- Interactive map of Cao Xanh
- Country: Vietnam
- Region: Red River Delta
- City: Quảng Ninh
- Established: June 16, 2025

Government
  - Type: Ward

Area
  - Total: 38.89 km^{2} (15.02 sq mi)

Population (2025)
  - Total: 23,809 people
  - Density: 612.2/km^{2} (1,586/sq mi)
- Time zone: UTC+07:00

Cao Xanh is a ward of Quảng Ninh city, Vietnam. It is one of the 54 communes, wards, and special zones of the city.

== Geography ==
Cao Xanh is a ward in Quảng Ninh city, located 65km east of Đông Triều ward, 105km southwest of Móng Cái 1 ward, and 15km west of Cẩm Phả ward. It borders with Thống Nhất to the north; Hoành Bồ, Bãi Cháy wards to the west; Hồng Gai, Hà Lầm, Hà Tu wards to the south and Quang Hanh ward to the east.

== History ==
Prior to 2025, the area of Cao Xanh ward was formerly Cao Xanh and Hà Khánh wards of Hạ Long city in Quảng Ninh province.

On June 16, 2025, the Standing Committee of the National Assembly of Vietnam issued Resolution No. 1679/NQ-UBTVQH15 on the reorganization of commune-level administrative units in Quảng Ninh province. Cao Xanh ward was established by merging the entire area and population of Hà Khánh and Cao Xanh wards (formerly part of Hạ Long provincial city).

On September 1, 2025, Quảng Ninh city was established based on the entire former Quảng Ninh province. Therefore, Cao Xanh ward belongs to Quảng Ninh city.
