= Bình Liêu district =

Coordinates: 21.583°N 107.417°E

Bình Liêu District Huyện Bình Liêu
- District
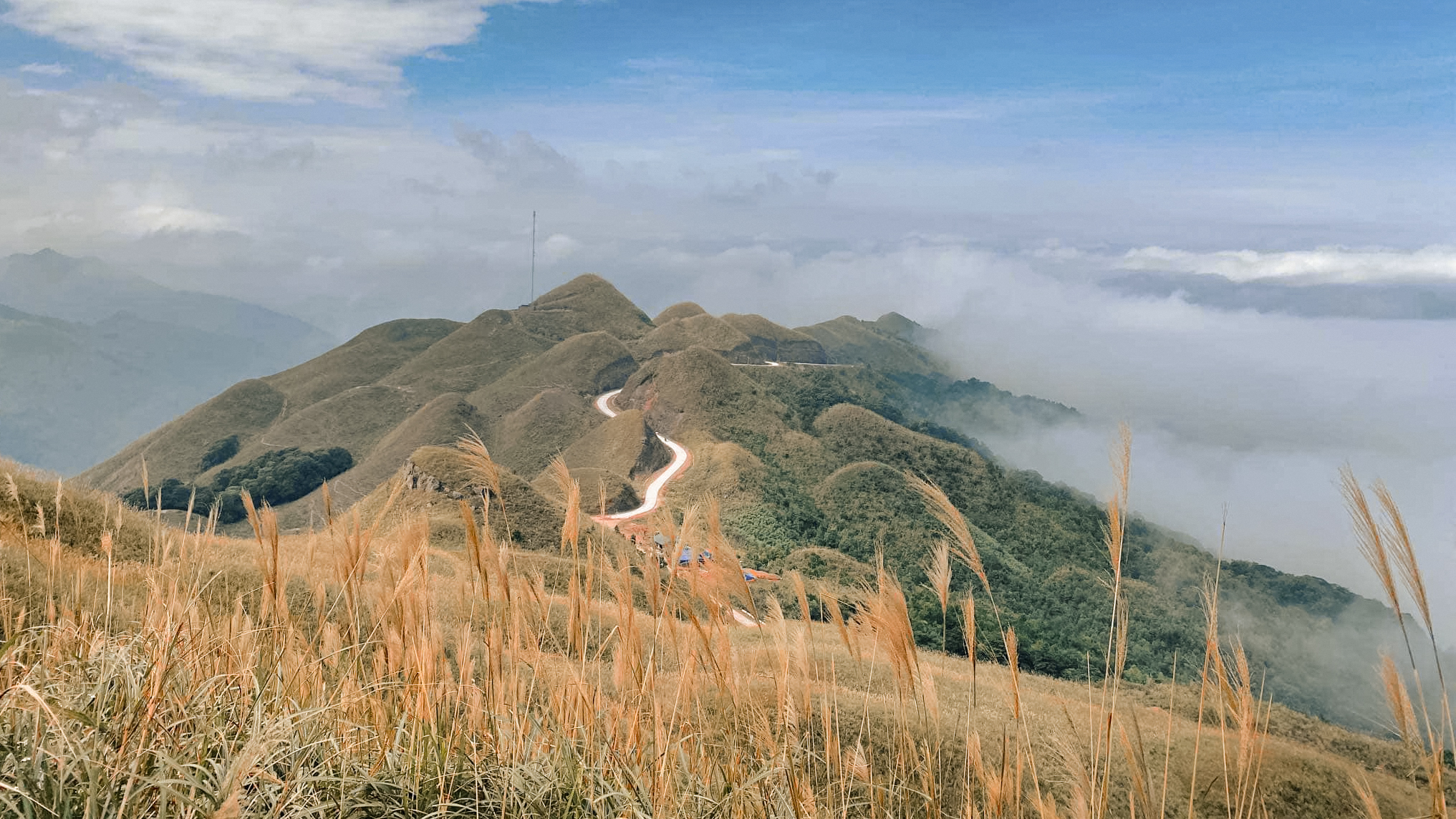
- Bình Liêu grass hills

- Seal
- Interactive map of Bình Liêu District
- Location within Vietnam Location within Southeast Asia Location within Asia
- Country: Vietnam
- Region: Northeast
- Province: Quảng Ninh
- Capital: Bình Liêu

Government
  - Chairman of the People's Council: Lý Văn Bình
  - Chairman of the People's Committee: Nguyễn Thị Tuyết Hạnh
  - Secretary: Dương Mạnh Cường

Area
  - Total: 182 sq mi (471 km^{2})

Population (2020)
  - Total: 33.000
  - Density: 180/sq mi (70/km^{2})
  - Ethnicities: Tay Dao San Chi Kinh Hoa...
- Time zone: UTC+7 (Indochina Time)
- Website: binhlieu.quangninh.gov.vn

Bình Liêu is a former rural district of Quảng Ninh Province in the Northeast region of Vietnam. It is known for its mountainous terrain, ethnic diversity, and growing tourism sector, often compared to a "mini Sa Pa" due to its terraced fields, cool climate, and cultural festivals. As of 2020, the district had a population of 33,000. The district covers an area of 471 km². The district capital is Bình Liêu.

== Geography ==
Bình Liêu District is located in the northeastern part of Quảng Ninh Province, bordering China to the north with a 43 km border line. It is approximately 108 km from Hạ Long City and 258 km from Hanoi. The district features diverse mountainous terrain, with peaks such as Cao Ba Lanh (1,113 m) and Cao Xiêm (1,472 m), the highest point in Quảng Ninh Province. The landscape includes terraced rice fields, grassy hills, and forests suitable for growing specialty crops like star anise, cinnamon, and tea. The climate is cool and temperate year-round, making it ideal for eco-tourism and trekking. Major rivers include the Tiên Yên River.

== History ==
Bình Liêu was established as a district (châu) on December 26, 1919, during the French colonial period, comprising seven communes. It was fully liberated in December 1950 following the Border Campaign. In October 1963, it became part of Quảng Ninh Province after the merger of Hải Ninh Province and Hồng Quảng Area. The district town of Bình Liêu was established on February 23, 1977. On January 1, 2020, Tình Húc Commune was merged into Bình Liêu Town.

== Administrative divisions ==
Bình Liêu District is divided into 7 administrative units, consisting of 1 urban township (or townlet, thị trấn): Bình Liêu (capital), and 6 rural communes (xã): Đồng Tâm, Đồng Văn, Hoành Mô, Húc Động, Lục Hồn, Vô Ngại.

== Economy ==
The economy of Bình Liêu has shifted towards services and tourism in recent years. From 2015 to 2020, economic growth averaged 13.5% annually, with services growing at 16.52%, industry at 15.94%, and agriculture at 6.87%. Key sectors include forestry (star anise, cinnamon), border trade through the Hoành Mô Border Gate, and agriculture. Tourism is a major driver, focusing on cultural festivals, trekking, and natural landscapes. In 2024, the district welcomed over 220,000 visitors, generating nearly 200 billion VND in revenue. Per capita income reached approximately 37.53 million VND (about 1,600 USD) in 2020. Poverty rates decreased from 43.27% in 2010 to 16.53% in 2013.

== Demographics and culture ==
Over 96% of the population consists of ethnic minorities, primarily Tày (58.4%), Dao (25.6%), and Sán Chỉ (15.4%), with smaller groups of Kinh and Hoa. The district preserves rich cultural traditions, including the Then singing of the Tày, Soong Co festival of the Sán Chỉ, and Đình Lục Nà Festival. Notable attractions include reed grass seasons in November, terraced fields in autumn, and trekking routes like the "dinosaur spine" trail.
