= Đầm Hà district =

Đầm Hà district Huyện Đầm Hà
- District
- Seal

- Location within Vietnam
- Country: Vietnam
- Region: Northeast
- Province: Quảng Ninh
- Founded: 2001: re-established
- Capital: Đầm Hà

Government
  - People's Committee headquarters: Phố Lê Lương, thị trấn Đầm Hà

Area
  - Total: 15,999 sq mi (41,436 km^{2})

Population (2019)
  - Total: 47.060
  - Density: 300/sq mi (114/km^{2})
  - Ethnicities: Kinh; Dao
- Time zone: UTC+7 (UTC + 7)
- Website: damha.quangninh.gov.vn

Đầm Hà is a former rural district of Quảng Ninh province in the northeastern region of Vietnam. As of 2003 the district had a population of 31,414. The district covers an area of 290 km^{2}. The district capital lies at Đầm Hà.

== Administrative divisions ==
Đầm Hà, Đại Bình, Đầm Hà, Tân Bình, Dực Yên, Quảng An, Quảng Lâm, Quảng Lợi, Quảng Tân, Tân Lập.
