= Móng Cái 2 =

Ward in Quảng Ninh city, Vietnam

- Ward
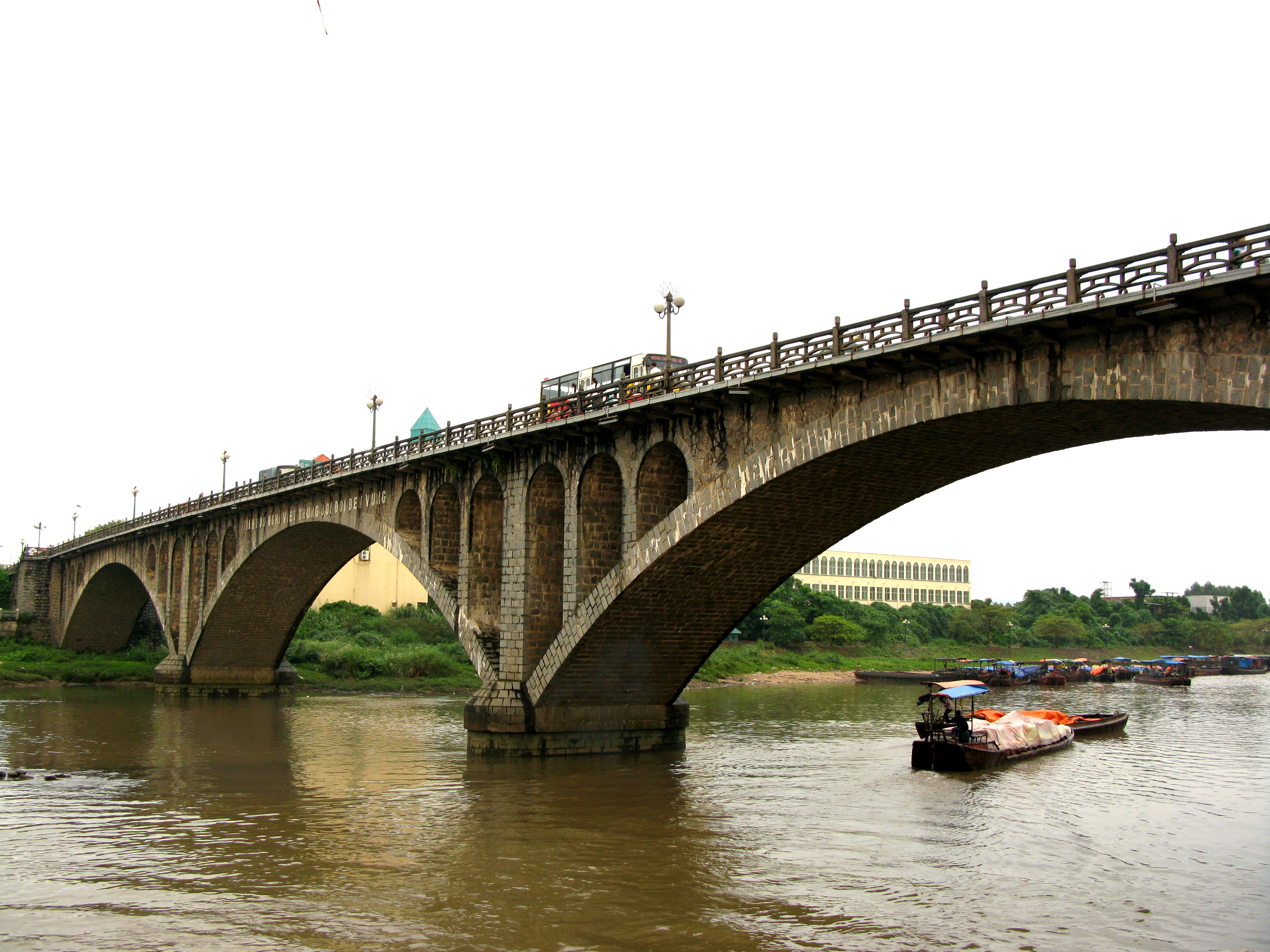
- Ka Long bridge
- Country: Vietnam
- Region: Red River Delta
- City: Quảng Ninh
- Established: June 16, 2025

Government
  - Type: Ward

Area
  - Total: 72.97 km^{2} (28.17 sq mi)

Population (2025)
  - Total: 29,189 people
  - Density: 400.0/km^{2} (1,036/sq mi)
- Time zone: UTC+07:00

Móng Cái 2 (pronounced [mɔŋ˧˥ kai̯˧˥]); is a ward in Quảng Ninh city, Vietnam. It is one of 54 communes, wards and special zones in the city.

== Geography ==
Móng Cái 2 is a ward located in the northern part of Quảng Ninh city, 105 km northeast of Hạ Long ward, 90 km northeast of Cẩm Phả ward, 135 km northeast of Uông Bí ward and 160 km northeast of Đông Triều ward. It border with People's Republic of China to the north, Móng Cái 1 ward to the east, Gulf of Tonkin to the south and Móng Cái 3 ward to the west.

== History ==
Prior to 2025, the area of the current Móng Cái 2 ward corresponds to Ninh Dương ward, Ka Long ward and Vạn Ninh commune in Móng Cái city, Quảng Ninh province.

On June 16, 2025, the Standing Committee of the National Assembly of Vietnam issued Resolution No. 1679/NQ-UBTVQH15 on the reorganization of commune-level administrative units in Quảng Ninh province. Móng Cái 2 was established by merging the entire area and population of Ka Long, Ninh Dương wards and Vạn Ninh commune (formerly part of Móng Cái provincial city).

On September 1, 2026, Quảng Ninh city was established based on the entire former Quảng Ninh province. Móng Cái 2 ward belongs to Quảng Ninh city.
