= Ba Chẽ =

- Commune
- Interactive map of Ba Chẽ
- Coordinates: 21.2731377917145°N 107.28214767726267°E
- Country: Vietnam
- Region: Red River Delta
- Municipality: Quảng Ninh
- Established: 16 June 2025

Area
  - Total: 332.68 km^{2} (128.45 sq mi)

Population (2025)
  - Total: 17,504
  - Density: 52/km^{2} (130/sq mi)

Ba Chẽ is a commune in the municipality of Quảng Ninh, Vietnam. It is also the largest commune by area in the municipality.

== History ==
The area of present-day Ba Chẽ Commune was formerly part of Ba Chẽ district, Quảng Ninh province.

On 16 June 2025:

- The National Assembly of Vietnam adopted Resolution No. 203/2025/QH15 amending and supplementing several articles of the Constitution of Vietnam (effective from 16 June 2025). Under the resolution, district-level administrative units nationwide ceased to operate from 1 July 2025.
- The Standing Committee of the National Assembly of Vietnam issued Resolution No. 1679/NQ-UBTVQH15 on the arrangement of commune-level administrative units in Quảng Ninh province in 2025 (effective from 16 June 2025). Under the resolution, the entire area and population of Ba Chẽ township, Thanh Sơn, Nam Sơn, and Đồn Đạc communes, formerly part of Ba Chẽ district, and part of Hải Lạng commune, formerly part of Tiên Yên district, were merged to form a new commune named Ba Chẽ.

On 24 August 2026, the National Assembly adopted Resolution No. 36/2026/QH16 on the establishment of the municipality of Quảng Ninh from the entire area and population of Quảng Ninh province (effective from 1 September 2026). Since then, Ba Chẽ Commune has been part of the municipality of Quảng Ninh.
