= Ba Chẽ district =

Coordinates: 21.300°N 107.167°E

Ba Chẽ district Huyện Ba Chẽ
- District
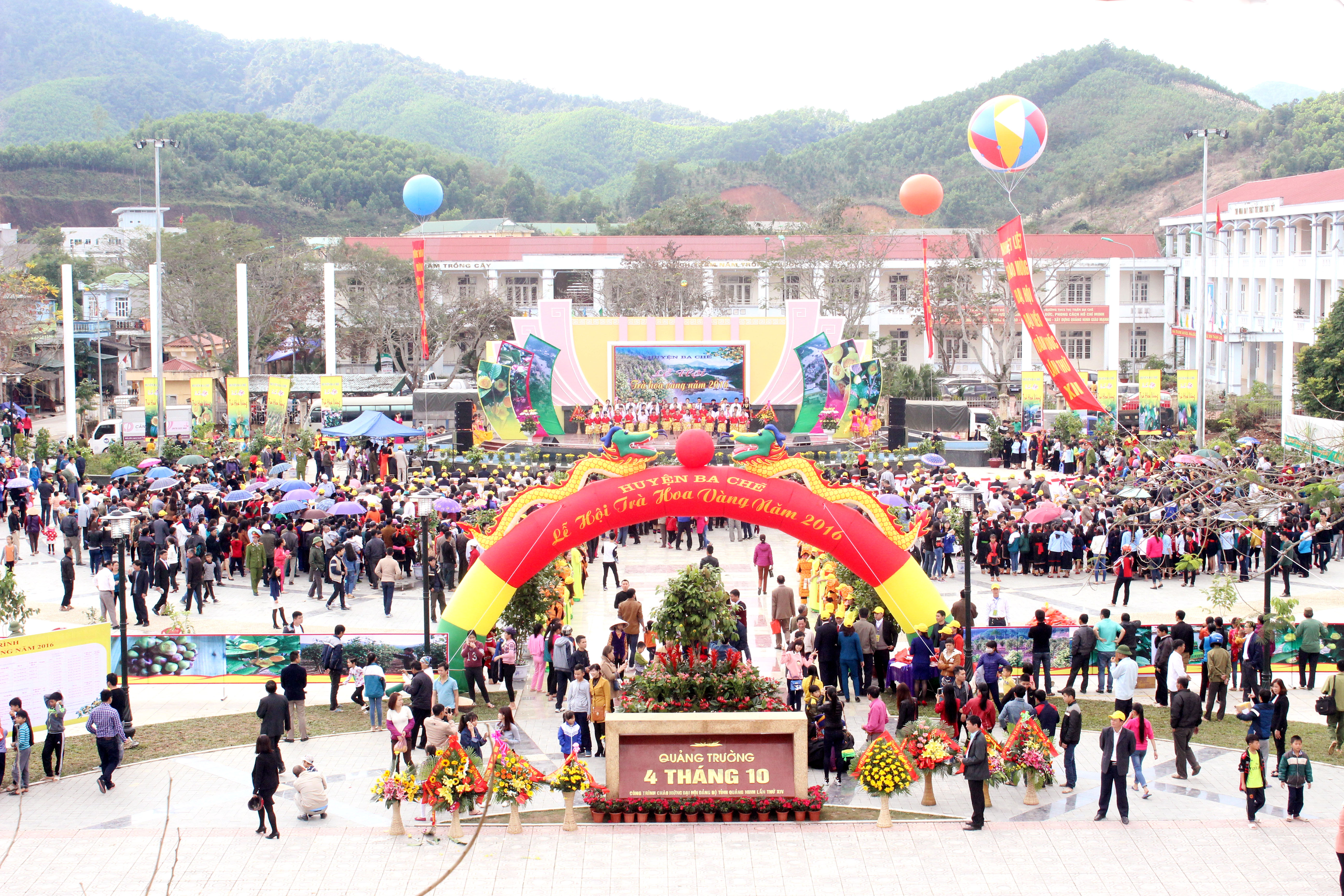
- Festival promoting products from the Ba Che district

- Seal
- Interactive map of Ba Chẽ district
- Country: Vietnam
- Region: Northeast
- Province: Quảng Ninh
- Capital: Ba Chẽ

Government
  - Chairman of the People's Council: Bùi Văn Lưu

Area
  - Total: 223 sq mi (577 km^{2})

Population (2003)
  - Total: 17,335
- Time zone: UTC+7 (UTC + 7)
- Website: bache.quangninh.gov.vn

Ba Chẽ is a former district of Quảng Ninh province in the northeastern region of Vietnam. As of 2003 the district had a population of 17,335. The district covers an area of 577 km^{2}. The district capital lies at Ba Chẽ.

== Administrative divisions ==
The district is divided into 1 township and 7 communes: Ba Chẽ, Đồn Đạc, Nam Sơn, Đạp Thanh, Minh Cầm, Lương Mông, Thanh Lâm, Thanh Sơn.
