= Hoành Bồ district =

Coordinates: 21.133°N 107.000°E

Hoành Bồ district Huyện Hoành Bồ
- former District
- Interactive map of Hoành Bồ district
- Country: Vietnam
- Region: Northeast
- Province: Quảng Ninh
- District capital: Trới (now Hoành Bồ ward)
- Subdivisions: List: 1 town; 12 communes

Hoành Bồ is a former district of Quảng Ninh province in the northeastern region of Vietnam. In 2003 the district had a population of 39,650. The district covers an area of 824 km^{2}. The district capital lies at Trới.

The district was subdivided to 13 commune-level subdivisions, including Trới township and the rural communes of: Bằng Cả, Dân Chủ, Đồng Lâm, Đồng Sơn, Hòa Bình, Kỳ Thượng, Lê Lợi, Quảng La, Sơn Dương, Tân Dân, Thống Nhất, Vũ Oai.

On December 17, 2019, the district was incorporated into the territories of Hạ Long city.
