= Yên Tử Mountain =

Mountain and associated mountain range in Vietnam

Coordinates: 21.1617°N 106.7171°E

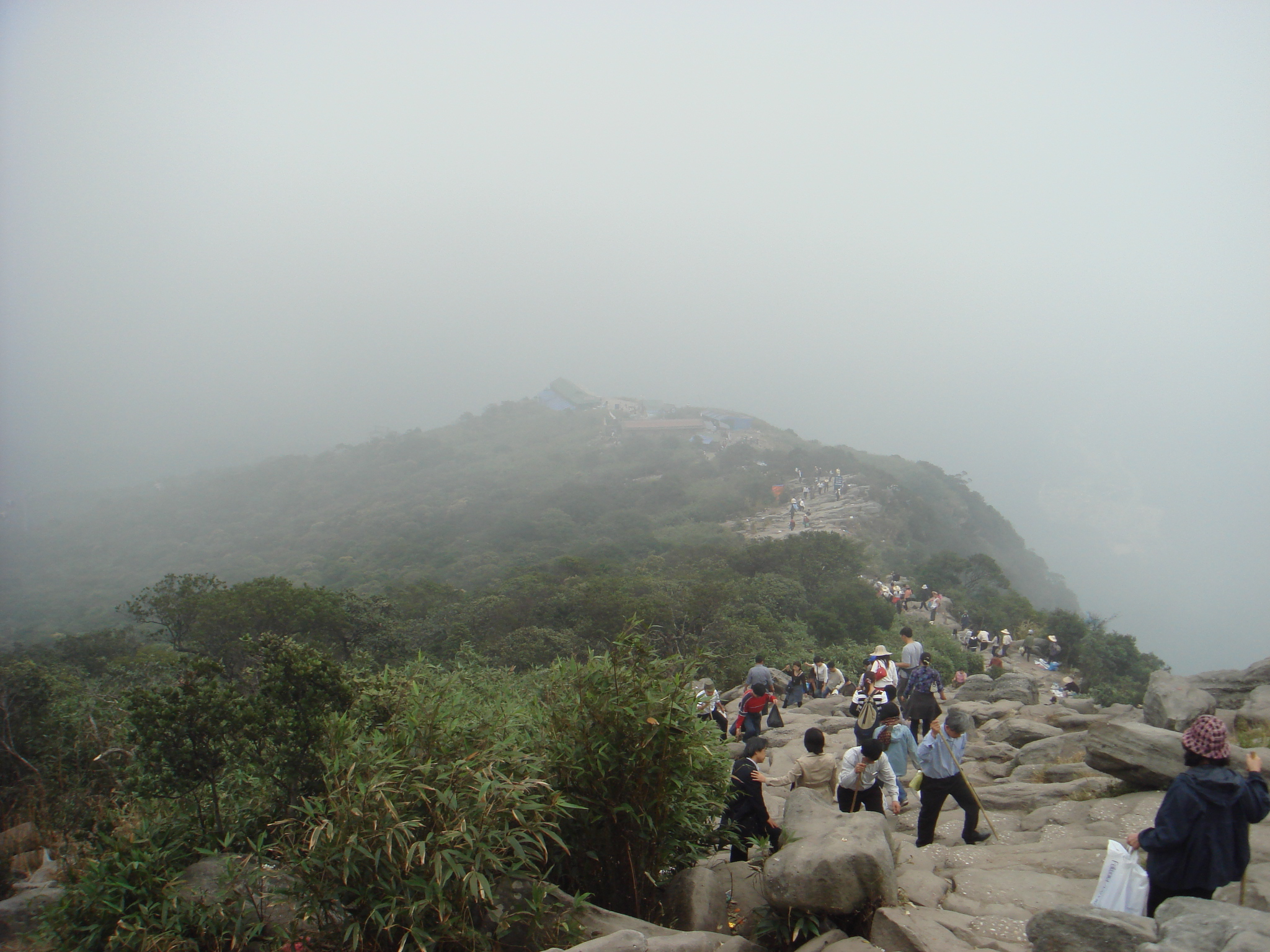

Highest point
- Elevation: 1,068 m (3,504 ft)

Geography

Yên Tử (Vietnamese pronunciation: [ien˧ tɯ˧˩˧]) is a mountain range in Vietnam spanning the cities of Quảng Ninh, Bắc Ninh and Hải Phòng. It is also the name of the highest mountain in the range, with its summit at an elevation of 1068 m.

This is a mountain range associated with the Trần dynasty in Vietnamese history as well as with the Truc Lam Zen sect.

The range includes the Yen Tu-Vinh Nghiem-Con Son, Kiep Bac Complex of Monuments and Landscape, a UNESCO World Heritage Site.

The Trúc Lâm Yên Tử Zen Monastery is located within the complex.This is one of the largest monasteries in Vietnam and was chosen by Trần Nhân Tông (a 13th-century Vietnamese emperor) as his place of retreat. Then he founded the Truc Lam Zen Sect, contributing to the rich culture of Vietnamese Buddhism.

The highest pagoda on Yen Tu Mountain is Chùa Đồng (Bronze Pagoda), it is constructed entirely of bronze and weighs approximately 70 tons. Situated at the summit of the mountain, it is one of the largest bronze pagodas in Vietnam. Inside the pagoda are statues of Buddha Shakyamuni and the three founders of the Trúc Lâm Zen sect - Trần Nhân Tông, Pháp Loa, and Huyền Quang seated on lotus thrones.
