= Bình Liêu =

Bình Liêu Xã Bình Liêu
- Commune
- Bình Liêu commune
- Location within Vietnam
- Coordinates: 21°31′25″N 107°23′51″E
- Country: Vietnam
- Region: Northeast
- City: Quảng Ninh
- Time zone: UTC+7 (UTC + 7)

Bình Liêu is a commune (xã) of Quảng Ninh, Vietnam.
