= Dongxing =

Dongxing (simplified Chinese: 东兴; traditional Chinese: 東興; pinyin: Dōngxīng) may refer to:

- Dongxing District (东兴区), Neijiang, Sichuan
- Dongxing, Guangxi (东兴市), county-level city of Fangchenggang, Guangxi
- Dongxing Subdistrict (东兴街道)
  - Dongxing Subdistrict, Wuzhou, in Dieshan District, Wuzhou, Guangxi
  - Dongxing Subdistrict, Baotou, in Donghe District, Baotou, Inner Mongolia
- Towns named Dongxing (东兴镇)
  - Dongxing, Dongxing, Guangxi, in Dongxing, Guangxi
  - Dongxing, Huanjiang County, in Huanjiang Maonan Autonomous County, Guangxi
  - Dongxing, Rong County, Sichuan, in Rong County, Sichuan
  - Dongxing, Maoxian in Mao County, Sichuan
- Dongxing Township (东兴乡)
  - Dongxing Township, Da County, in Da County, Sichuan
  - Dongxing Township, Gulin County, in Gulin County, Sichuan
  - Dongxing Township, Jiangyou, in Jiangyou Sichuan
  - Dongxing Township, Langzhong, in Langzhong, Sichuan
  - Dongxing Township, Mao County, in Mao County, Sichuan
