= Đầm Hà =

- Interactive map of Đầm Hà
- Coordinates: 21.35369641645519°N 107.58912703098142°E
- Country: Vietnam
- City: Quảng Ninh
- Region: Red River Delta

Area
  - Total: 142.43 km^{2} (54.99 sq mi)

Population (2025)
  - Total: 25,947
  - Density: 182/km^{2} (470/sq mi)

Đầm Hà is a commune of Quảng Ninh, Vietnam.

== History ==
In 1940, Đầm Hà Town was an administrative unit of Đầm Hà District. In 1957, Đầm Hà Town was converted into Đầm Hà Township.

On 10 September 1981, the Council of Ministers issued Decision No. 63-HĐBT on the delineation of the boundaries of several communes, wards, and townships in Quảng Ninh Province. Accordingly, Đầm Hà Township was dissolved and merged into Đầm Hà Commune.

On 28 May 1991, the Government Organization and Personnel Board issued Decision No. 284-TCCP on the re-establishment of Đầm Hà Township, based on 100 hectares of natural area and a population of 3,528 from Đầm Hà Commune.

On 12 June 2006, the Government issued Decree No. 58/2006/NĐ-CP. Accordingly, 72.44 hectares of natural area and 1,024 people from Đầm Hà Commune; 24.45 hectares of natural area and 355 people from Quảng Tân Commune; and 124.81 hectares of natural area and 575 people from Tân Bình Commune were transferred to Đầm Hà Township for administration.

On 16 June 2025:

- The National Assembly adopted Resolution No. 203/2025/QH15 amending and supplementing several articles of the Constitution of the Socialist Republic of Vietnam. The resolution took effect on 16 June 2025. Under the resolution, district-level administrative units throughout Vietnam ceased to operate from 1 July 2025.
- The Standing Committee of the National Assembly of Vietnam adopted Resolution No. 1679/NQ-UBTVQH15 on the reorganization of commune-level administrative units in Quảng Ninh Province in 2025. The resolution took effect on 16 June 2025. Accordingly, the entire natural area and population of Đầm Hà Township and the communes of Tân Bình, Đại Bình, Tân Lập, and Đầm Hà were merged to form a new commune named Đầm Hà.

On 24 August 2026, the National Assembly adopted Resolution No. 36/2026/QH16 establishing Quảng Ninh City on the basis of the entire natural area and population of Quảng Ninh Province. The resolution took effect on 1 September 2026. Since then, Đầm Hà Commune has been part of Quảng Ninh City.
