= Hồng Gai =

Coordinates: 20°57′N 107°04′E

- Ward
- Interactive map of Hồng Gai
- Country: Vietnam
- City: Quảng Ninh
- Time zone: UTC+07:00 (Indochina Time)

Hồng Gai is a ward (phường) of Quảng Ninh, Vietnam.
