= Móng Cái 1 =

Ward in Quảng Ninh city, Vietnam

- Ward
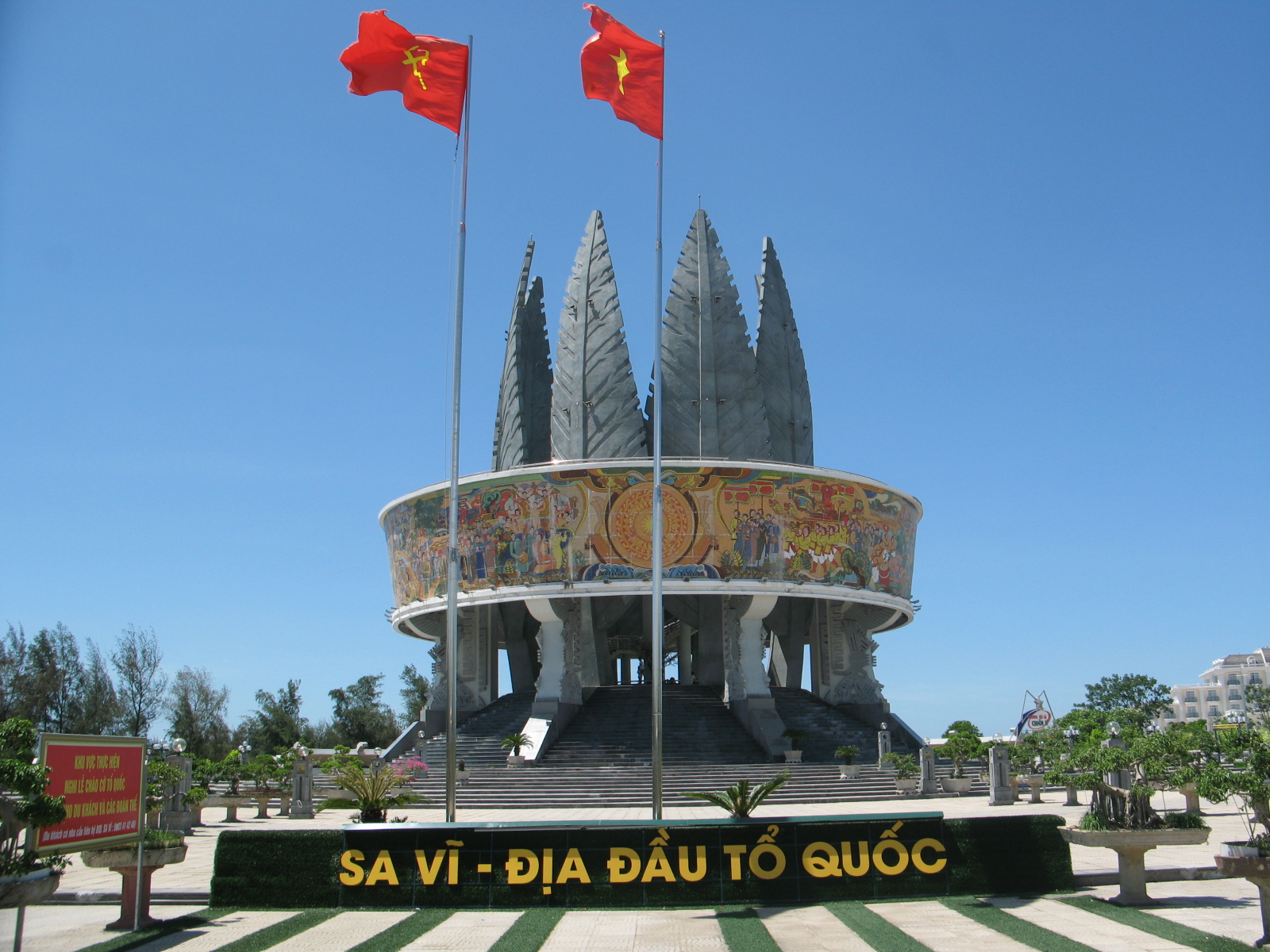
- Sa Vĩ cape
- Country: Vietnam
- Region: Red River Delta
- City: Quảng Ninh
- Established: June 16, 2025

Area
  - Total: 82.47 km^{2} (31.84 sq mi)

Population (2025)
  - Total: 46,558
  - Density: 564.5/km^{2} (1,462/sq mi)
- Time zone: UTC+07:00

Móng Cái 1 (pronounced [mɔŋ˧˥ kai̯˧˥]); is a ward in Quảng Ninh city, Vietnam. It is one of the 54 communes, wards and special zones of the city.

== Geography ==
Location of Móng Cái 1 ward on Quảng Ninh city map (highlight in red).

Móng Cái 1 is a ward located in the northern part of Quảng Ninh city, 110 km northeast of Hạ Long ward. It borders with People's Republic of China to the north and east, Gulf of Tonkin to the south and Móng Cái 2 ward to the west.

== History ==
Prior to 2025, the area of Móng Cái 1 ward was formerly Trần Phú, Hải Hòa, Bình Ngọc, Trà Cổ wards and Hải Xuân commune of Móng Cái provincial city, Quảng Ninh province.

On June 16, 2025, the Standing Committee of the National Assembly of Vietnam issued Resolution No. 1679/NQ-UBTVQH15 on the reorganization of commune-level administrative units in Quảng Ninh province. Mong Cai 1 Ward was established by merging the entire area and population of Trần Phú, Hải Hòa, Bình Ngọc, Trà Cổ wards and Hải Xuân commune (formerly part of Móng Cái provincial city).

On September 1, 2025, Quảng Ninh city was established based on the entire former Quảng Ninh province. Therefore, Móng Cái 1 ward belongs to Quảng Ninh city.
