= Móng Cái 3 =

Ward of Quảng Ninh city, Vietnam

- Ward
- Country: Vietnam
- Region: Red River Delta
- City: Quảng Ninh
- Established: 16 June, 2025

Government
  - Type: Ward
  - Body: Móng Cái 3 ward Party Committee

Area
  - Total: 90.03 km^{2} (34.76 sq mi)

Population (2025)
  - Total: 22,565 people
  - Density: 250.6/km^{2} (649.2/sq mi)
- Time zone: UTC+07:00

Móng Cái 3 (pronounced [mɔŋ˧˥ kai̯˧˥]); is a ward in Quảng Ninh city, Vietnam. This is one of 54 communes, wards and special zones in the city.

== Geography ==
Móng Cái 3 is a ward located in the northern part of Quảng Ninh city, 105km northeast of Hạ Long ward.

== History ==
Prior to 2025, the area of Móng Cái 3 ward was formerly Hải Yên ward and Hải Đông commune of Móng Cái provincial city, Quảng Ninh province.

On June 12, 2025, the Standing Committee of the National Assembly of Vietnam issued Resolution No. 1679/NQ-UBTVQH15 on the reorganization of commune-level administrative units in Quảng Ninh province. The Mong Cai 3 ward was established by merging the entire area and population of Hải Yên ward and Hải Đông commune (formerly part of Móng Cái provincial city).

On September 1, 2025, Quảng Ninh city was established based on the entire former Quảng Ninh province. Móng Cái 3 ward belongs to Quảng Ninh city.
