= Tiên Yên district =

Coordinates: 21°20′N 107°25′E

Tiên Yên District Huyện Tiên Yên
- District
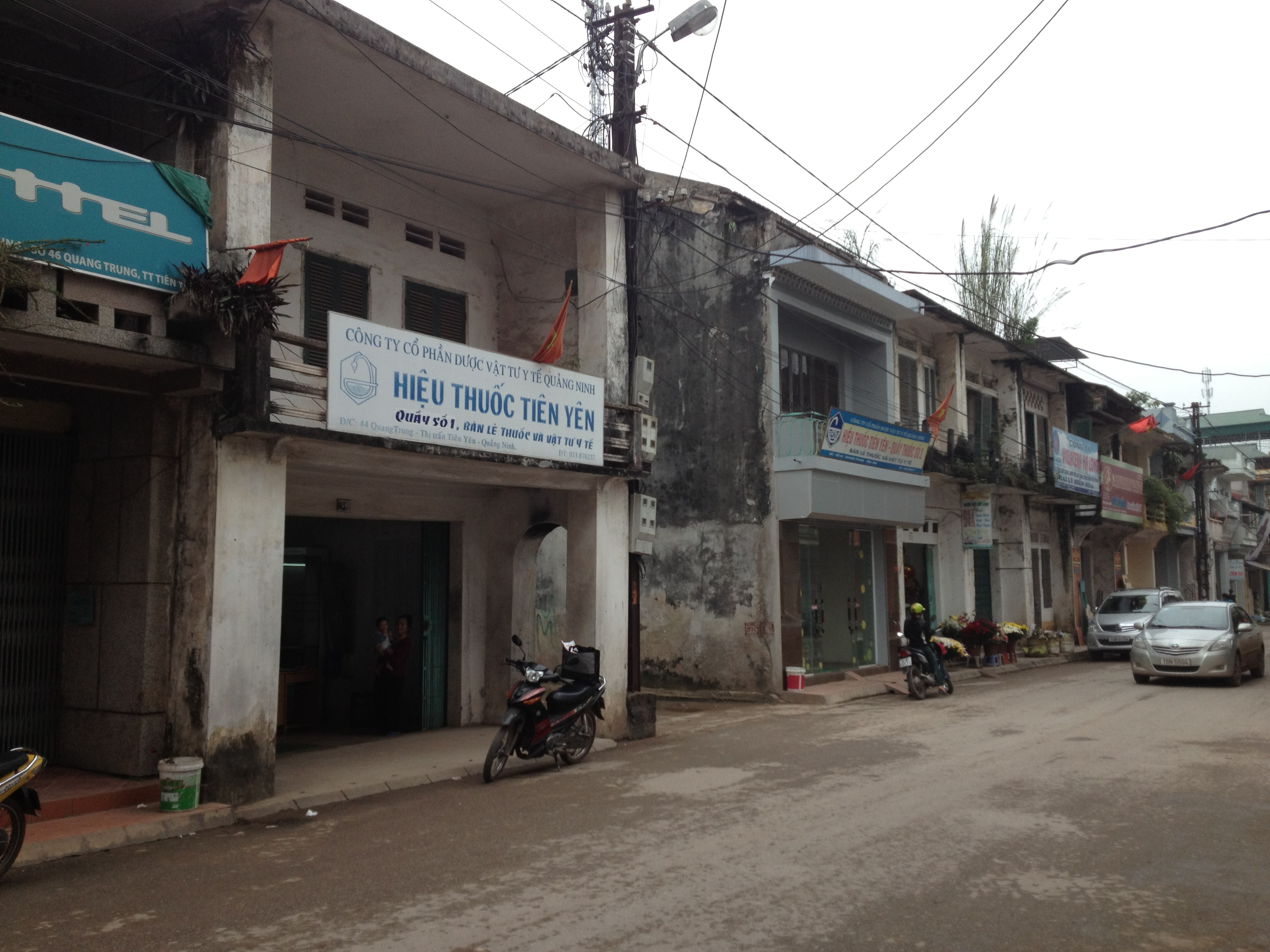
- Town of Tiên Yên

- Seal

- Location within Vietnam Location within Southeast Asia Location within Asia
- Country: Vietnam
- Region: Northeast
- Province: Quảng Ninh
- Capital: Tiên Yên

Government
  - Chairman of the People's Committee: Hà Hải Dương
  - Chairman of the People's Council: Nguyễn Xuân Long
  - Secretary: Hà Hải Dương

Area
  - Total: 2,492 sq mi (6,454 km^{2})

Population (2018)
  - Total: 54.000
  - Density: 190/sq mi (72/km^{2})
  - Ethnicities: Kinh Dao Tay San Chi San Diu Nung Hoa Thai...
- Time zone: UTC+7 (UTC + 7)
- Website: tienyen.quangninh.gov.vn

Tiên Yên is a former district of Quảng Ninh province in the northeastern region of Vietnam. As of 2003 the district had a population of 43,227. The district covers an area of 617 km^{2}. The district capital lies at Tiên Yên.

== Administrative divisions ==
Tiên Yên, Đại Dực, Hà Lâu, Phong Dụ, Điền Xá, Yên Than, Hải Lạng, Tiên Lãng, Đông Ngũ, Đông Hải, Đồng Rui.

== Climate ==
Climate data for Tiên Yên
Month	Jan	Feb	Mar	Apr	May	Jun	Jul	Aug	Sep	Oct	Nov	Dec	Year
Record high °C (°F)	31.5 (88.7)	33.5 (92.3)	36.1 (97.0)	37.2 (99.0)	37.3 (99.1)	37.7 (99.9)	38.0 (100.4)	38.1 (100.6)	37.5 (99.5)	34.8 (94.6)	32.5 (90.5)	30.5 (86.9)	38.1 (100.6)
Mean daily maximum °C (°F)	19.0 (66.2)	19.6 (67.3)	22.1 (71.8)	26.4 (79.5)	30.4 (86.7)	31.8 (89.2)	32.0 (89.6)	31.8 (89.2)	31.2 (88.2)	28.8 (83.8)	25.3 (77.5)	21.5 (70.7)	26.7 (80.1)
Daily mean °C (°F)	15.1 (59.2)	16.3 (61.3)	19.1 (66.4)	23.1 (73.6)	26.4 (79.5)	27.8 (82.0)	28.0 (82.4)	27.5 (81.5)	26.5 (79.7)	23.9 (75.0)	20.2 (68.4)	16.5 (61.7)	22.5 (72.5)
Mean daily minimum °C (°F)	12.4 (54.3)	14.0 (57.2)	17.0 (62.6)	20.7 (69.3)	23.5 (74.3)	25.0 (77.0)	25.2 (77.4)	24.8 (76.6)	23.5 (74.3)	20.7 (69.3)	16.9 (62.4)	13.3 (55.9)	19.8 (67.6)
Record low °C (°F)	0.9 (33.6)	3.5 (38.3)	4.0 (39.2)	10.6 (51.1)	15.1 (59.2)	17.8 (64.0)	20.6 (69.1)	21.2 (70.2)	15.4 (59.7)	9.1 (48.4)	4.9 (40.8)	0.4 (32.7)	0.4 (32.7)
Average precipitation mm (inches)	38.0 (1.50)	35.9 (1.41)	58.9 (2.32)	111.4 (4.39)	238.0 (9.37)	349.6 (13.76)	453.4 (17.85)	422.0 (16.61)	309.2 (12.17)	143.6 (5.65)	49.7 (1.96)	29.7 (1.17)	2,239.4 (88.16)
Average rainy days	9.3	12.7	16.5	14.5	14.8	18.0	19.1	18.7	13.3	9.2	7.1	6.9	159.9
Average relative humidity (%)	83.5	86.8	88.9	88.0	85.6	86.5	86.6	87.1	84.6	82.1	81.2	81.1	85.2
Mean monthly sunshine hours	70.6	54.6	34.5	72.9	137.1	135.1	143.9	149.5	158.2	179.8	142.4	99.2	1,377.7
Source: Vietnam Institute for Building Science and Technology
