= Hoành Bồ =

Coordinates: 20°46′N 106°12′E

- Ward
- Interactive map of Hoành Bồ
- Country: Vietnam
- City: Quảng Ninh
- Time zone: UTC+07:00 (Indochina Time)

Hoành Bồ is a ward (phường) of Quảng Ninh, Vietnam.

Hoành Bồ ward was formerly the township of Trới, the district capital of Hoành Bồ district.
