= Móng Cái =

- Provincial city (Class-II)
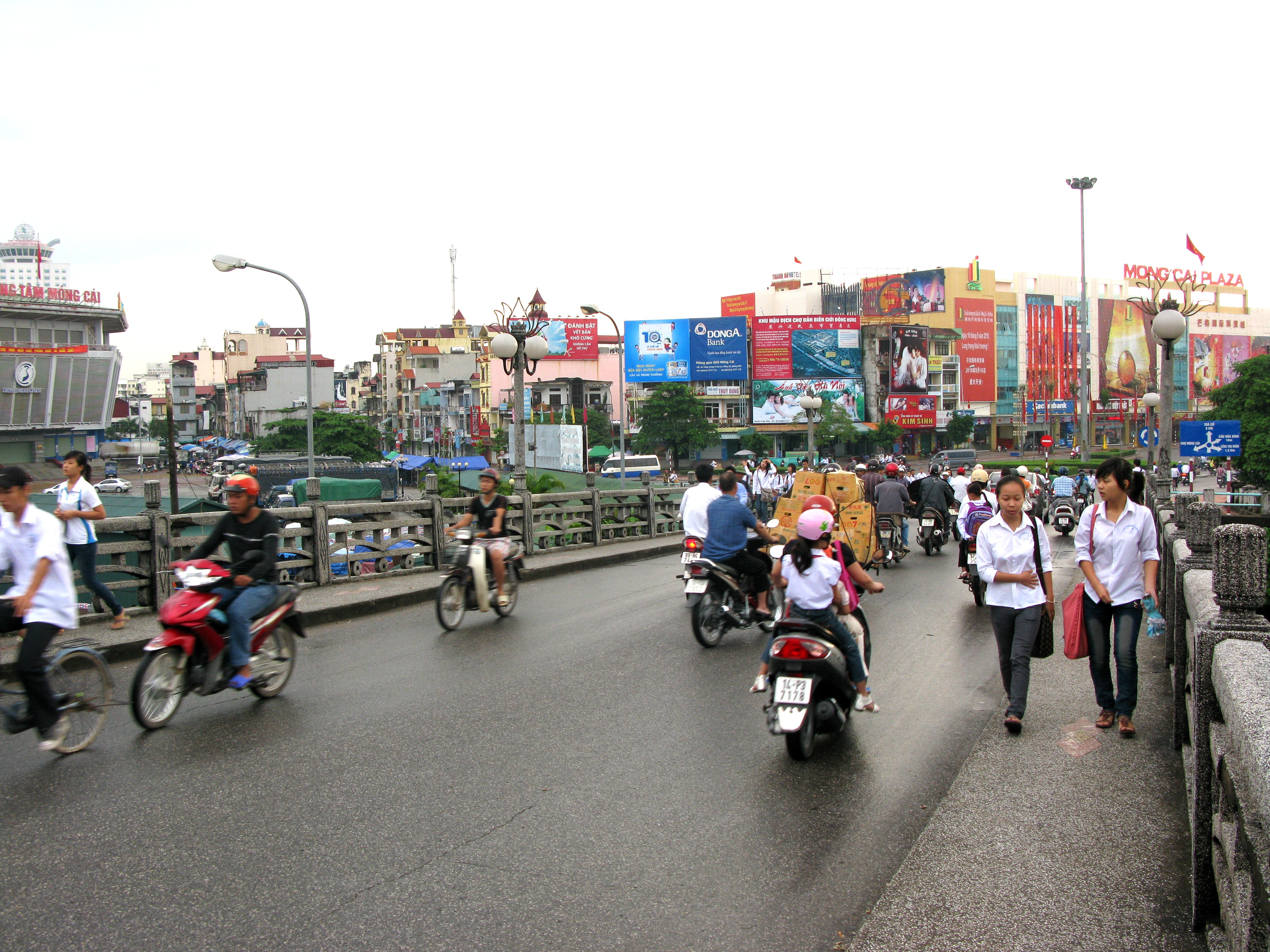
- A view of Móng Cái provincial city

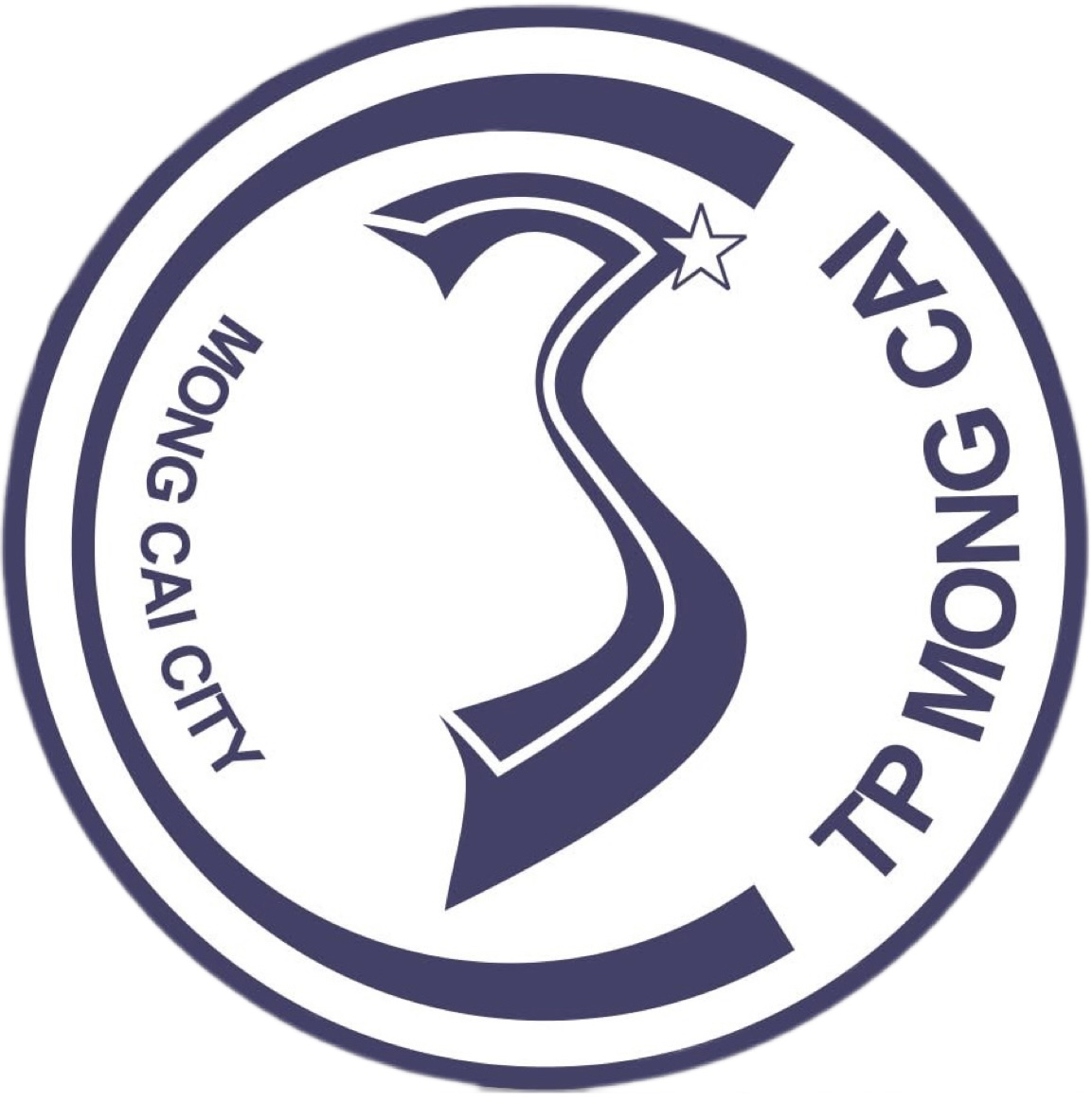
- Seal
- Nicknames: "Market Municipality" (Thành phố thương mại); "The Border Market" (Chợ vùng biên)
- Motto: "Solidarity – Pioneering – Bravery – Creativity" (Note: An official motto from 2024 to present.) (Đoàn kết – Tiên phong – Bản lĩnh – Sáng tạo)
- Interactive map of Móng Cái
- Location in Vietnam.
- Coordinates: 21°32′N 107°58′E
- Country: Vietnam
- Province: Quảng Ninh
- Establishment: XVII century
- Central hall: No.1, Hữu Nghị road, Trấn Phúc ward, Móng Cái city

Government
  - Type: Municipality
  - People Committee's Chairman: Hồ Quang Huy
  - People Council's Chairman: Nguyễn Văn Đô
  - Front Committee's Chairman: Đỗ Viết Mạnh
  - Party Committee's Secretary: Hoàng Bá Nam

Area
  - Provincial city (Class-II): 519.58 km^{2} (200.61 sq mi)

Population (April 1, 2019)
  - Provincial city (Class-II): 108,553
  - Density: 209/km^{2} (540/sq mi)
  - Urban: 66,434
  - Metro: 42,119
  - Ethnicities: Kinh; Nungz; Tanka; Tay
- Time zone: UTC+7 (Indochina Time)
- ZIP code: 01000–02000–01500 (Note: An official code from 2024 to present.)
- Climate: Cwa
- Website: Mongcai.Quangninh.gov.vn; Mongcai.Quangninh.dcs.vn

Móng Cái (pronounced [mɔŋ˧˥ kai̯˧˥], /mong:gaai:si/) is a former provincial city in the former Quảng Ninh province in Red River Delta of Vietnam, located at the border with China.

== History ==
Its name, Móng Cái (硭街市, /mong:gaai/), comes from Yue Chinese (commonly referred to as Cantonese for the entire branch) and means "mong market". The name reflects the conditions of the settlement along this coastal area during the Middle Ages, when the Nùng, Tày and especially the Tanka communities lived together there.

Located on the Sino–Vietnamese frontier, Móng Cái sits on the Southern bank of Beilun River across from Dongxing city of China's Guangxi Autonomous Region. It had a population of about 108,553 in 2019. One of these areas is the Trần Phúc ward.

== Geography ==
Móng Cái City was divided into :

- 7 wards : Bình Ngọc, Hải Hòa, Hải Yên, Ka Long, Ninh Dương, Trấn Phúc.
- 9 communes : Bắc Sơn, Hải Tiến, Hải Đông, Hải Sơn, Hải Xuân, Quảng Nghĩa, Vạn Ninh, Vĩnh Thực, Vĩnh Trung.

=== Topography ===
Móng Cái covers an area of 519.28 km^{2}.

=== Demography ===
As of 2019, Móng Cái had a population of 108,553.

=== Climate ===
Climate data for Móng Cái
Month	Jan	Feb	Mar	Apr	May	Jun	Jul	Aug	Sep	Oct	Nov	Dec	Year
Record high °C (°F)	28.0 (82.4)	29.9 (85.8)	34.8 (94.6)	33.8 (92.8)	37.5 (99.5)	38.8 (101.8)	39.1 (102.4)	37.8 (100.0)	39.0 (102.2)	36.4 (97.5)	33.2 (91.8)	30.9 (87.6)	39.1 (102.4)
Mean daily maximum °C (°F)	18.4 (65.1)	18.9 (66.0)	21.7 (71.1)	25.8 (78.4)	29.5 (85.1)	31.0 (87.8)	31.3 (88.3)	31.3 (88.3)	30.9 (87.6)	28.6 (83.5)	25.1 (77.2)	21.1 (70.0)	26.1 (79.0)
Daily mean °C (°F)	14.9 (58.8)	15.9 (60.6)	18.9 (66.0)	23.0 (73.4)	26.4 (79.5)	27.9 (82.2)	28.2 (82.8)	27.8 (82.0)	27.0 (80.6)	24.4 (75.9)	20.6 (69.1)	16.7 (62.1)	22.6 (72.7)
Mean daily minimum °C (°F)	12.4 (54.3)	13.7 (56.7)	16.8 (62.2)	20.8 (69.4)	23.8 (74.8)	25.4 (77.7)	25.6 (78.1)	25.2 (77.4)	24.1 (75.4)	20.3 (68.5)	17.3 (63.1)	13.3 (55.9)	19.9 (67.8)
Record low °C (°F)	1.1 (34.0)	3.3 (37.9)	4.7 (40.5)	9.3 (48.7)	14.6 (58.3)	18.8 (65.8)	19.9 (67.8)	20.7 (69.3)	16.4 (61.5)	10.8 (51.4)	3.0 (37.4)	2.1 (35.8)	1.1 (34.0)
Average rainfall mm (inches)	46.5 (1.83)	42.8 (1.69)	59.8 (2.35)	122.6 (4.83)	272.2 (10.72)	448.3 (17.65)	593.3 (23.36)	469.4 (18.48)	313.1 (12.33)	182.6 (7.19)	73.9 (2.91)	36.9 (1.45)	2,661 (104.76)
Average rainy days	9.7	12.2	14.7	13.2	14.1	17.9	20.2	18.4	13.0	9.6	6.9	6.9	157.3
Average relative humidity (%)	80.3	84.2	86.9	87.2	86.0	86.8	86.6	86.7	83.3	79.6	77.2	76.2	83.5
Mean monthly sunshine hours	73.1	48.9	50.5	86.2	157.1	149.2	173.4	171.0	185.8	184.9	151.8	117.6	1,552.2
Source 1: Vietnam Institute for Building Science and Technology
Source 2: The Yearbook of Indochina

== Culture ==
=== Language ===
Due to its proximity to the China-Vietnam border, many languages are spoken in Móng Cái. In addition to the native Vietnamese language, Cantonese is widely spoken in the Center Market and English is becoming the second language of the younger generation. Mandarin Chinese is also spoken here, especially in commercial areas.

=== Tourism ===
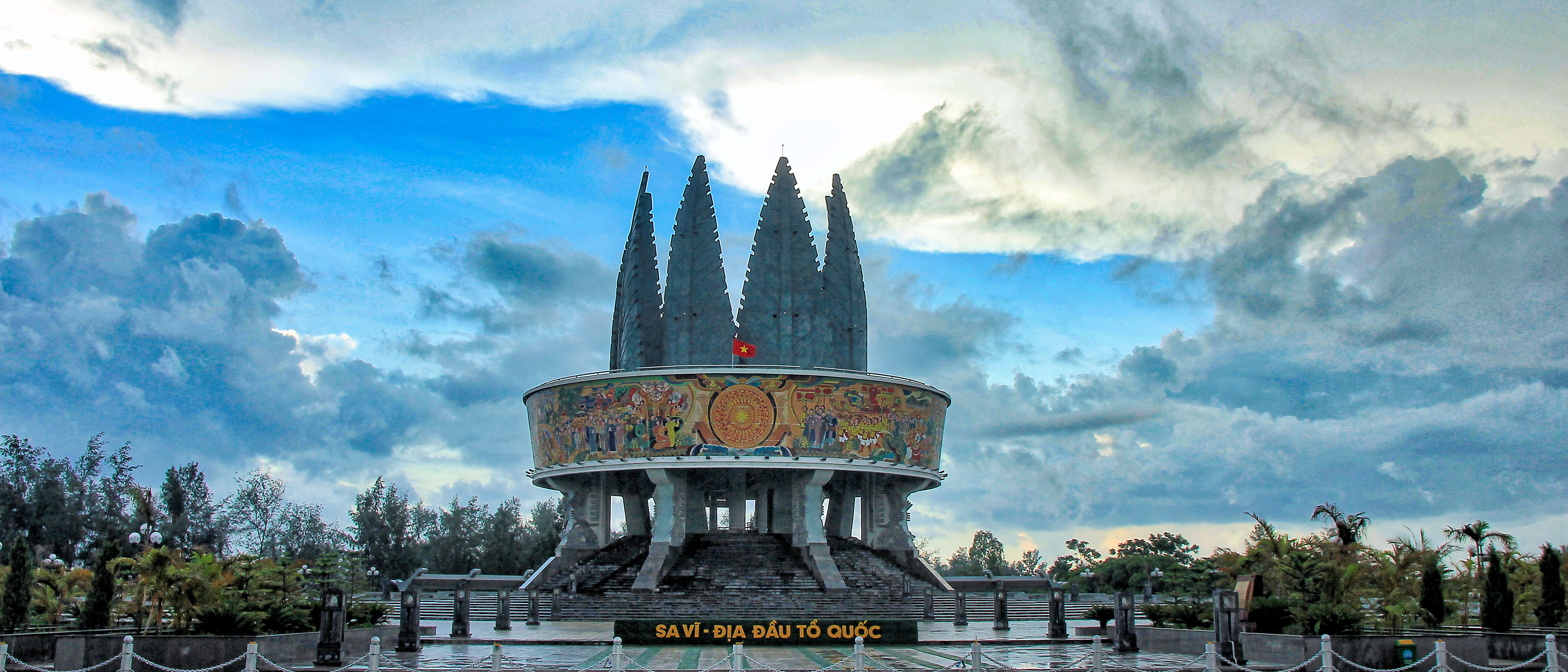
Monument of the Sa Vĩ Symbol.

The nearby Trà Cổ Beach of Móng Cái attracts many Vietnamese tourists who come every year from Hanoi or Haiphong. With two five-star hotels and a large number of private hotels and guesthouses, Móng Cái is able to provide more than adequate lodging for many tourists.

The city is home to a walking street night market in the Trấn Phúc urban district of the city closest to the border with China. It is also home to several daily open markets where products from China are sold wholesale and to tourists. Many of the cities merchants are from China and usually start business in the morning and return to their homes across the border in the late afternoon. The city can get quite crowded around major holidays such as the May 1st and Independence Day long weekends.

The city is famous for its seafood and many of these restaurants line the streets of the city.

The Sa Vĩ cape near the city is one of the extremes of the Vietnamese frontier. It is possible to look out from the point and easily see China on the other side.

== Economy ==
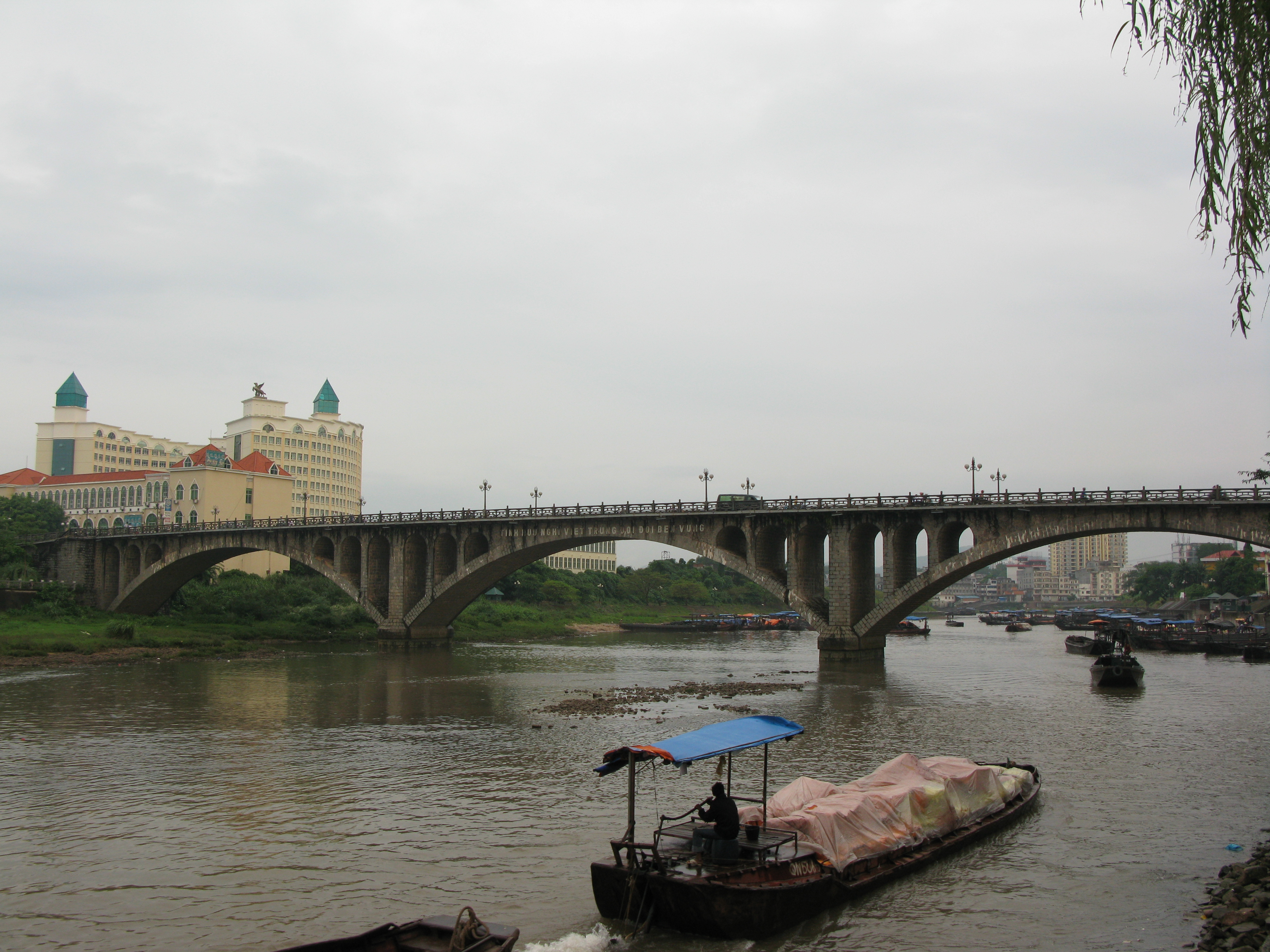
Ka Long old bridge on Ka Long river.

The volume of trade between Vietnam and China through the Móng Cái border gate reached US$2.4 billion and 4.1 billion in 2007 and 2008 respectively, the highest among the Vietnam-China border crossings. The cash flow via the banks located in Móng Cái was VND180,469 billion (US$11 billion). The volume of trade is increasing significantly year by year. In particular, counting up to the end of March 2008, the volume of trade reached 720 Million which an increase of 82% from the same period of the previous year. The tax revenue of Móng Cái in 2008 was more than 1,700 billion VND (nearly US$100 million) equal to 150% to the year of 2007 result in the fact that Móng Cái is only district level area in northern Vietnam has tax revenue more than 1,000 billion and rank third in the whole nation.

Regarding urbanization, Móng Cái is classified as a Class-II Provincial City as of 2008. Móng Cái is known as "Market City" because of its six big markets located in the city center.

== See also ==
- Cẩm Phả
- Đông Hưng
- Hạ Long
