= Quảng Ninh =

Centrally-governed city of Vietnam

- Centrally-governed city
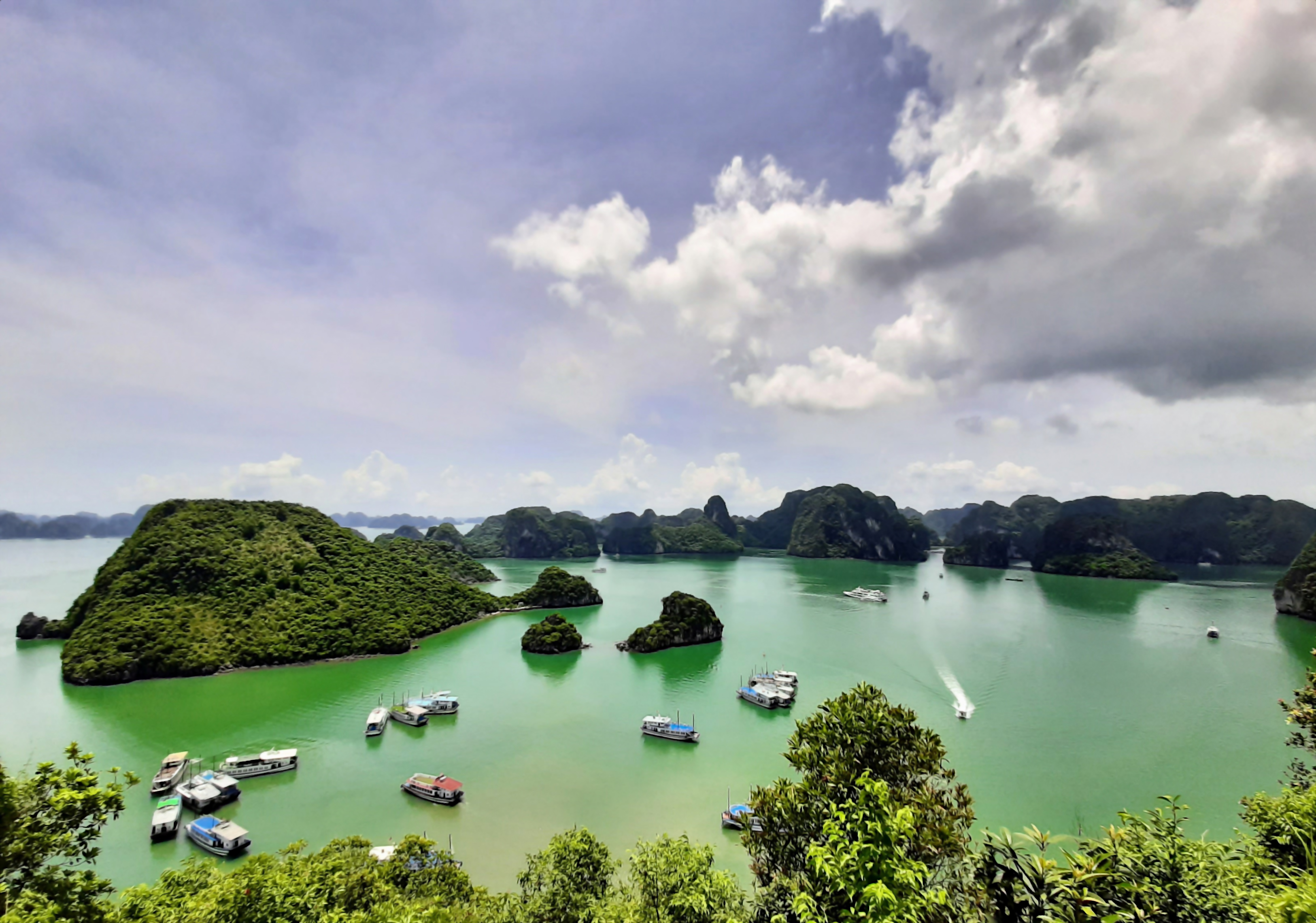
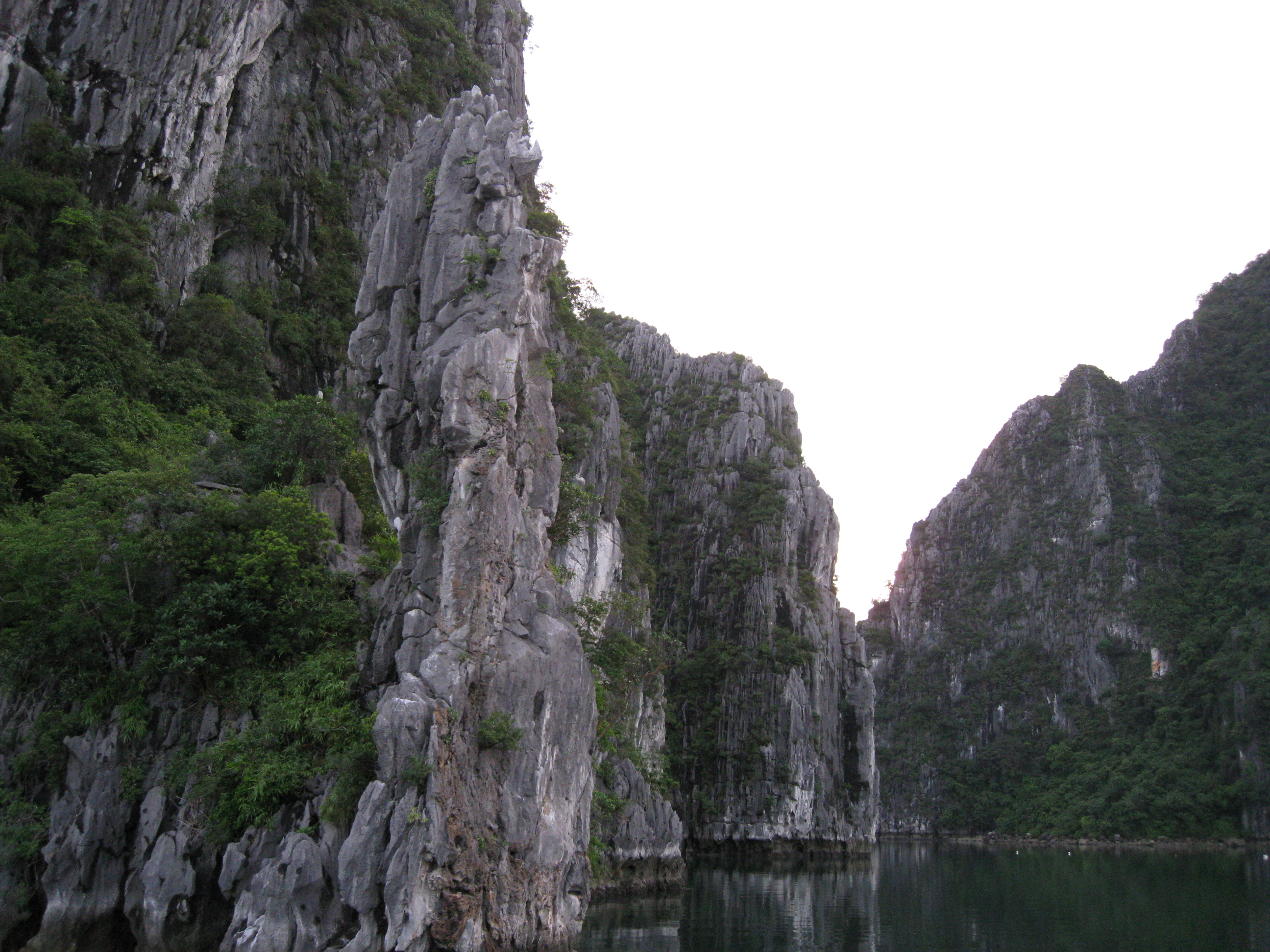
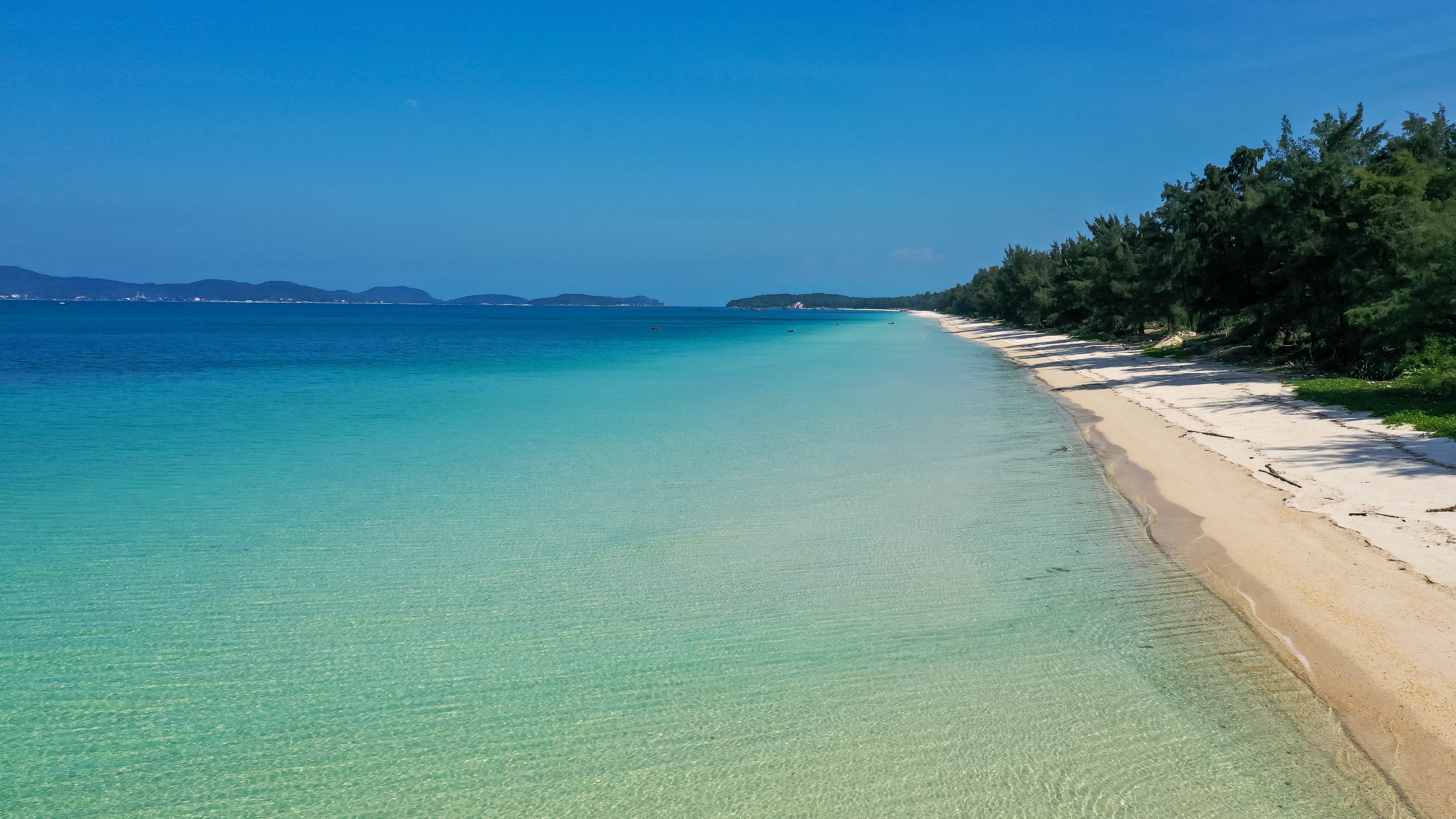
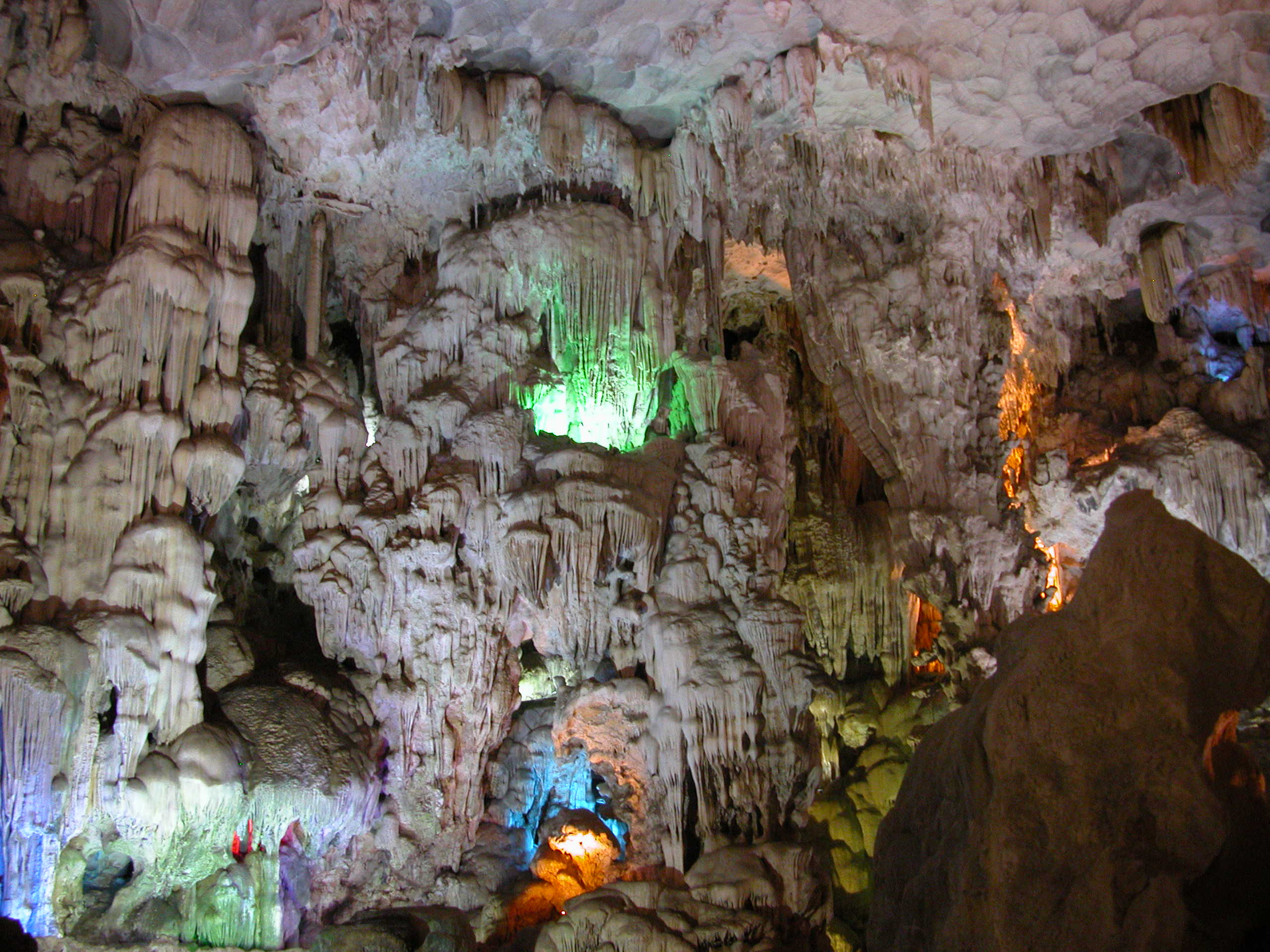
- From top, left to right: Hạ Long Bay, Bái Tử Long Bay, Hồng Vàn Beach, Dong Temple, Thiên Cung Cave, Cai Bau Temple.

- Seal
- Nickname: Đất mỏ (lit. 'The land of the [coal] mines')
- Location of Quảng Ninh in Vietnam
- Interactive map of Quảng Ninh
- Coordinates: 21°15′N 107°20′E
- Country: Vietnam
- Region: Red River Delta
- Capital: Hạ Long ward
- Subdivision: 30 wards, 22 communes and 2 special zones

Government
  - Body: Quảng Ninh Provincial People's Council
  - Chairman of People's Council: Nguyễn Xuân Ký
  - Chairman of People's Committee: Nguyễn Tường Văn

Area
  - Total: 6,207.95 km^{2} (2,396.90 sq mi)

Population (2025)
  - Total: 1,497,447
  - Density: 241.214/km^{2} (624.742/sq mi)

Ethnic groups
  - Vietnamese: 87.69%
  - Dao: 5.57%
  - Tày: 3.08%
  - Sán Dìu: 1.56%
  - Others: 2.1%

GDP
  - Province: VND 368.445 trillion US$ 14.75 billion
- Time zone: UTC+7 (ICT)
- Postal code: 01xxx–02xxx
- Area codes: 203
- ISO 3166 code: VN-13
- License plate: 14
- HDI (2023): ▲0.819 (2nd)
- Climate: Cwa
- Website: quangninh.gov.vn

Quảng Ninh (Vietnamese pronunciation: [kwâŋ nīŋ]) is a centrally-governed city along the northeastern coast of Vietnam and part of the Red River Delta, located 153 km (95 mi) east of Hanoi. It is divided into 30 wards, 22 communes, and two special zones. The city covers an area of 6,207.95 km^{2} (2,396.90 mi^{2}) and, as of 2023, had a population of 1,413,452. Nearly 80% of the city is mountainous, with 90% of Vietnam's coal output extracted there. The city is also home to Hạ Long Bay, a World Heritage Site that has 1,969 islands, out of which 989 have been given names.

Quảng Ninh has a Human Development Index of 0.819 (very high), ranking second among all centrally-governed cities and provinces of Vietnam.

== Geography ==
The city has the shape of an oblique rectangle inclined in a northeast-to-southwest direction. To the west, it borders a forest and mountain region. To the east, it is adjacent to the Gulf of Bắc Bộ. It features a meandering coastline, estuaries and tidal flats and more than 2,000 islands. Exactly 1,030 of these have been named. Quảng Ninh's coordinates are longitude 106º25′ to 108º25′ east and latitude 20º40′ to 21º40′ north. Its width from east to west is 195 km (at the widest part).

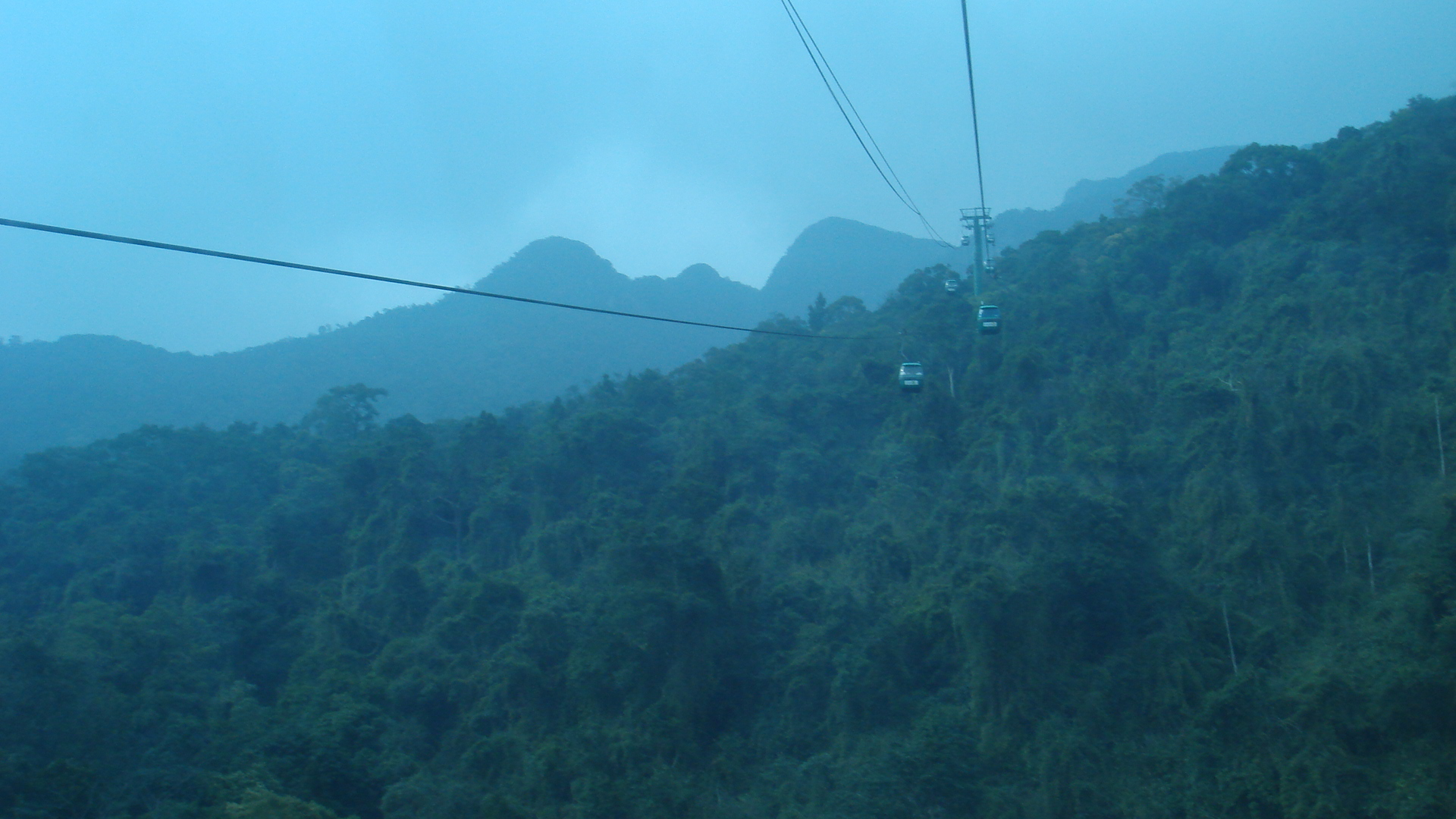
Quảng Ninh's mountains and forestry, seen from the cable car network in the Yên Tử pagoda complex

The length from north to south of the city is 102 km. The northernmost point is in a mountain range at Mo Toòng village (Hoành Mô commune, Bình Liêu district). The southernmost point is in Hạ Mai Island (Ngọc Vừng commune, Vân Đồn district). The westernmost point is in Vàng Chua River (Bình Dương and Nguyễn Huệ communes, Đông Triều city). The easternmost point is inland at Got Cape, northeast of Trà Cổ commune, Móng Cái town.

Quảng Ninh is located by Vietnam's border with China inland towards the north; the former townships of Bình Liêu, Hải Hà, and Móng Cái all border Dongxing City and Fangcheng County in Guangxi, with the border length going up to 170 km. To the east, it adjuncts to Bắc Bộ Gulf. The city also borders Lạng Sơn province and Bắc Ninh city to the west, and Hải Phòng city to the south. The coastal line is 250 km. The total area of Quảng Ninh is 8,239.243 km^{2}, of which 5,938 km^{2} is mainland. The area of islands, bays and sea is 2,448.853 km^{2}. The total area of the islands is 619.913 km^{2}.

=== Topography ===
More than 80% of Quảng Ninh's area is made up of mountains and hills. The 2,000 some islands are also considered mountains. The mountainous zone can be divided into two parts: the eastern mountainous region extending from Tiên Yên through Bình Liêu, Hải Hà, Đầm Hà and Móng Cái; and the western zone ranging from Tiên Yên through Ba Chẽ and Hoành Bồ, north of Uông Bí Town. The former is a continuation of the Thâp Van Đai Son range in China. There are two main chains: Quảng Nam Châu 1,507 m and Cao Xiêm 1,330 m. The western zone features smooth and curved mountains called Đông Triều with Yên Tử mountain (1,068 m) in Uông Bí and Am Váp Mount (1,094 m) in the former Hoành Bồ district.

The midland and coastal plains include a range of hills weathered by both wind and water; forming fields and river basins. They include the zones of Đông Triều, Uông Bí, northern Yên Hưng, southern Tiên Yên, Hải Hà and some of Móng Cái. In the estuaries, alluvial soil is deposited, creating low tidal flats. This can be found in the areas of southern Uông Bí, southern Yên Hưng (Hà Nam Island), eastern Yên Hưng, Đông Rui (Tiên Yên), southern Đầm Hà and Móng Cái, southeastern Hải Hà.

In the sea and island zone of Quảng Ninh, there are more than 2,000 islands, making up two-thirds of the country's islands. They extend along the coast for more than 250 km and divide into layers. The largest islands are Cái Bầu and Bản Sen, while the smallest are like rocks in a garden. Vân Đồn and Cô Tô are island districts. There are thousands of islands on Hạ Long Bay and Bái Tử Long Bay, some of which contain caves. Besides areas of alluvial deposits, there are white sand zones which have built up from tidal action. Some places have formed white sand mines producing materials for the glass industry (Van Hai), or have developed into tourism spots (Trà Cổ, Quan Lạn, Minh Châu, Ngọc Vừng).

The sea bottom terrain of Quảng Ninh has an average depth of 20 m. There are the remnants of streams and underwater rocky banks. The streams from the mainland connect to drains along the sea-floor; creating a series of waterways, canals and harbours along the coast.

=== Hydrography ===
In Quảng Ninh, there are rivers and springs which feature currents that differ between seasons. In winter, most rivers run dry; in summer, waterfalls pick up faster currents. The water current reaches 1.45 m^{3}/s in dry season, and up to 1,500 m^{3}/s in the rainy season. Quảng Ninh's sea borders upon the Gulf of Bắc Bộ. It is protected by the ranks of islands, so the wind is quieter and the water smoother. The gulf's current runs from north to south. It is Vietnam's coldest sea, with the temperature sometimes dipping below 13 °C. The average tide level recorded is 2.5 m.

=== Water resources ===
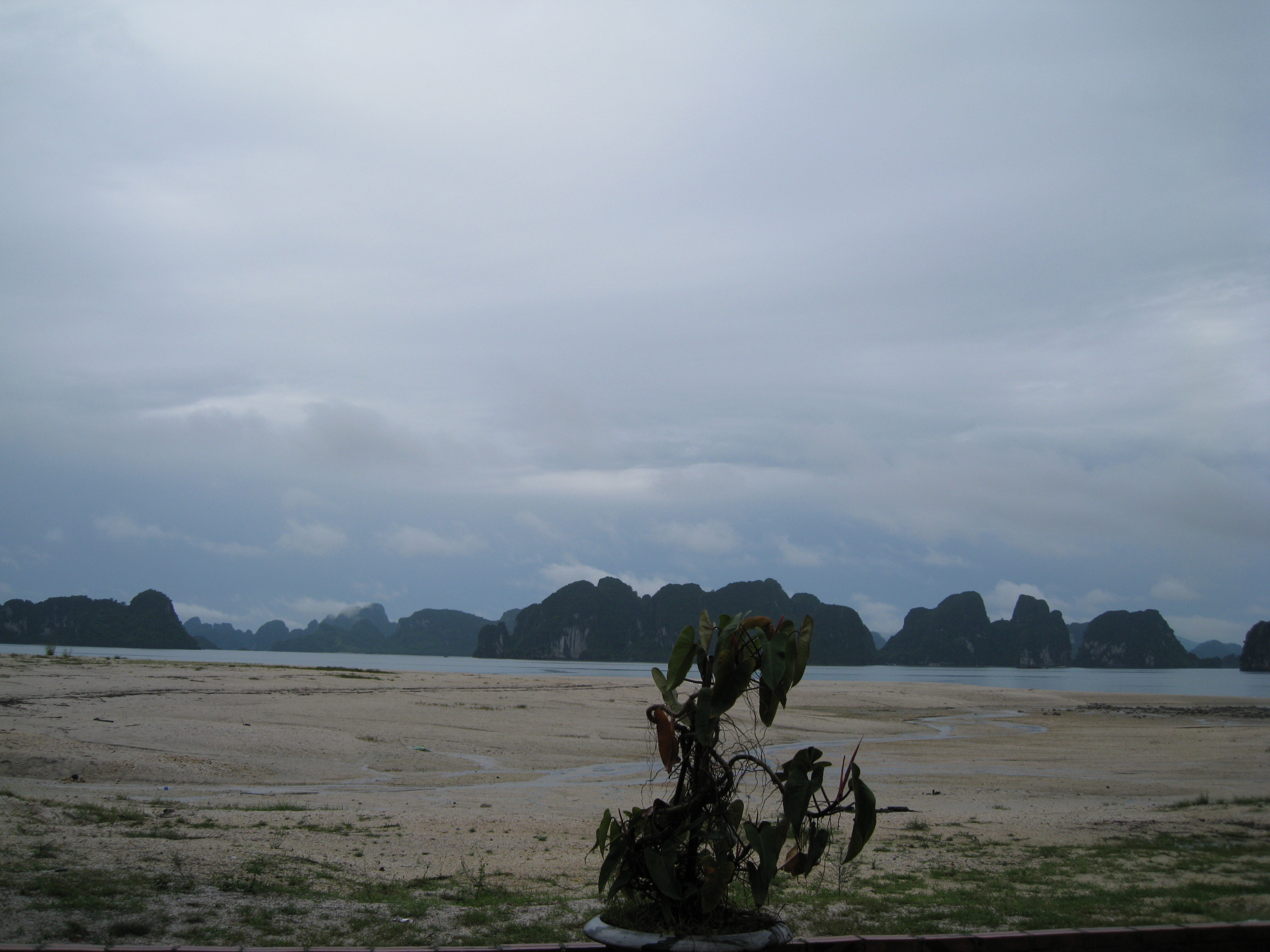
Quan Lạn island, Vân Đồn special zone

The largest rivers are: the Ka Long (the natural national border between China and Vietnam), Hà Côi, Đầm Hà, Tiên Yên, Phố Cũ, Ba Chẽ, Diễn Vọng, Trới, Míp, Uông, Đạm and Cầm rivers. The city border is the Kinh Thầy River which joins the Đá Bạch River and runs into Bạch Đằng. The total static capacity is estimated at 175.106 m^{3} of water. Out of the 72 lakes and dams, there are 28 large lakes with a total of capacity of 195.53 million m^{3} of water. The largest is Yên Lập Lake, which blocks the Míp Estuary. Its water volume is 1.18 million m^{3}. Other lakes include: Khuất Động, Trúc Bài Sơn, Khe Táu, Đoan Tĩnh, Khe Uơn, Khe Chếnh, Yên Trung, Bến Châu, Trại Lốc, Rộc Cả and An Biên.

Underground running water can be found on some of the larger islands. According to prospective data, 13 urban and industrial areas make use of 64,388 m^{3} water/day. In the city there are natural bottle water points in Quảng Hanh (Cẩm Phả), Khe Lạc (Tiên Yên) and Đồng Long (Bình Liêu). Mineral water is concentrated in the village of Quảng Hanh. There are 15 exploration holes, and according to preliminary results, capacity could be 1,004 m^{3}/day. Quảng Hanh mineral water is clear and colourless, with mineral content varying from 3.5 to 5.05 g/L.

=== Mineral resources ===
The city has natural mineral resources of coal, limestone, clay, kaolin, white sand, granite and so forth. Reserves of anthracite coal account for 90% of coal output of Vietnam. Limestone reserves are estimated at 3.1 billion tonnes which would be the basic input for cement manufacture. Other mineral resources phosphorus, titanium, antimony, quartz, and oil have been found which could auger more industrial projects in the city. Clay and glassy sand, material inputs in the building industry for manufacture of tiles, bricks, and ceramics are present.

=== Climate ===
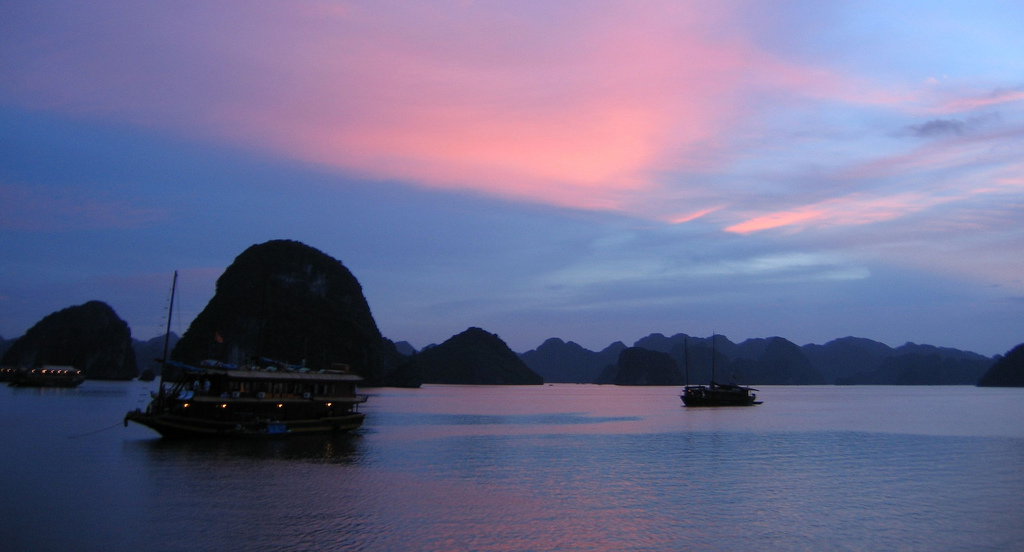
Hạ Long Bay at sunset

Quảng Ninh's climate is typical of the climate of Northern Vietnam; featuring all four seasons. In summer, it is hot, humid and rainy, while monsoons flourish. The average annual temperature recorded is 22.9 °C. In winter, it is cold (between 1 and 3 °C), dry, and sees less rainfall (between 150 mm and 400 mm). The average humidity is 82%. Annual average rainfall, influenced by north-eastern monsoons, varies between 1,700 mm and 2,400 mm (maximum recorded is 2751 mm), with rainfall concentrated in the summer months for 90 to 170 days, particularly in July and August.

Compared to other cities and provinces in the north, Quảng Ninh has been more influenced by the northeastern monsoon, in which mountainous regions such as Bình Liêu and Hải Hà, Đầm Hà experiences temperatures below 0 °C. Typhoons have an influence on the city, mainly in June, July and August; the intensity can be stronger in island and coastal regions.

Because of the terrain differences, the climates of sub-regions differ. Móng Cái is colder and rainy, with an average temperature of around 22 °C and rainfall reaching 2,751 mm. In Yên Hưng, the most southern area, the average temperature is 24 °C and gets an average rainfall of 1,700 mm. The mountainous region of the former districts of Hoành Bồ and Ba Chẽ has 20 days of frost a year. In the Bình Liêu District there is heavier rain (2,400 mm) and winter lasts for six months. The offshore island region is the wettest area, with 1,700 to 1,800 mm of rainfall per year, and winter is sometimes accompanied by mists.

Climate data for Hạ Long
Month	Jan	Feb	Mar	Apr	May	Jun	Jul	Aug	Sep	Oct	Nov	Dec	Year
Record high °C (°F)	28.8 (83.8)	29.5 (85.1)	32.0 (89.6)	34.6 (94.3)	36.1 (97.0)	37.3 (99.1)	37.9 (100.2)	36.5 (97.7)	36.3 (97.3)	33.6 (92.5)	33.8 (92.8)	29.7 (85.5)	37.9 (100.2)
Mean daily maximum °C (°F)	19.4 (66.9)	19.3 (66.7)	21.8 (71.2)	25.9 (78.6)	30.0 (86.0)	31.3 (88.3)	31.8 (89.2)	31.2 (88.2)	30.6 (87.1)	28.5 (83.3)	25.3 (77.5)	21.9 (71.4)	26.4 (79.5)
Daily mean °C (°F)	16.1 (61.0)	16.6 (61.9)	19.3 (66.7)	23.1 (73.6)	26.8 (80.2)	28.2 (82.8)	28.6 (83.5)	27.9 (82.2)	27.0 (80.6)	24.7 (76.5)	21.2 (70.2)	17.8 (64.0)	23.1 (73.6)
Mean daily minimum °C (°F)	13.9 (57.0)	14.8 (58.6)	17.5 (63.5)	21.2 (70.2)	24.4 (75.9)	25.8 (78.4)	26.1 (79.0)	25.2 (77.4)	24.2 (75.6)	21.9 (71.4)	18.4 (65.1)	15.1 (59.2)	20.7 (69.3)
Record low °C (°F)	5.0 (41.0)	5.3 (41.5)	7.1 (44.8)	11.4 (52.5)	15.9 (60.6)	18.4 (65.1)	21.4 (70.5)	21.1 (70.0)	16.6 (61.9)	14.0 (57.2)	9.0 (48.2)	1.7 (35.1)	1.7 (35.1)
Average precipitation mm (inches)	23 (0.9)	25 (1.0)	41 (1.6)	91 (3.6)	170 (6.7)	299 (11.8)	327 (12.9)	445 (17.5)	282 (11.1)	159 (6.3)	37 (1.5)	19 (0.7)	1,918 (75.5)
Average precipitation days	7.7	11.0	13.8	11.6	11.4	15.6	15.6	18.6	14.1	10.1	5.7	5.2	140.3
Average relative humidity (%)	80.2	84.6	87.6	86.7	83.0	83.6	83.4	85.6	82.3	78.5	75.9	76.5	82.3
Mean monthly sunshine hours	87	48	47	89	190	173	200	173	188	189	164	143	1,690
Source: Vietnam Institute for Building Science and Technology

== Administrative divisions ==
Quảng Ninh city divided into 54 commune-level administrative units, including 30 wards, 22 communes and 2 special zones.

- 30 wards: Hạ Long (capital), An Sinh, Bãi Cháy, Bình Khê, Cẩm Phả, Cao Xanh, Cửa Ông, Đông Mai, Đông Triều, Hà An, Hà Lầm, Hà Tu, Hiệp Hòa, Hoàng Quế, Hoành Bồ, Hồng Gai, Liên Hòa, Mạo Khê, Móng Cái 1, Móng Cái 2, Móng Cái 3, Mông Dương, Phong Cốc, Quang Hanh, Quảng Yên, Tuần Châu, Uông Bí, Vàng Danh, Việt Hưng, Yên Tử.
- 22 communes: Ba Chẽ, Bình Liêu, Cái Chiên, Đầm Hà, Điền Xá, Đông Ngũ, Đường Hoa, Hải Hòa, Hải Lạng, Hải Ninh, Hải Sơn, Hoành Mô, Kỳ Thượng, Lục Hồn, Lương Minh, Quảng Đức, Quảng Hà, Quảng La, Quảng Tân, Thống Nhất, Tiên Yên, Vĩnh Thực.
- 2 special zones: Vân Đồn, Cô Tô.

== Demographics ==
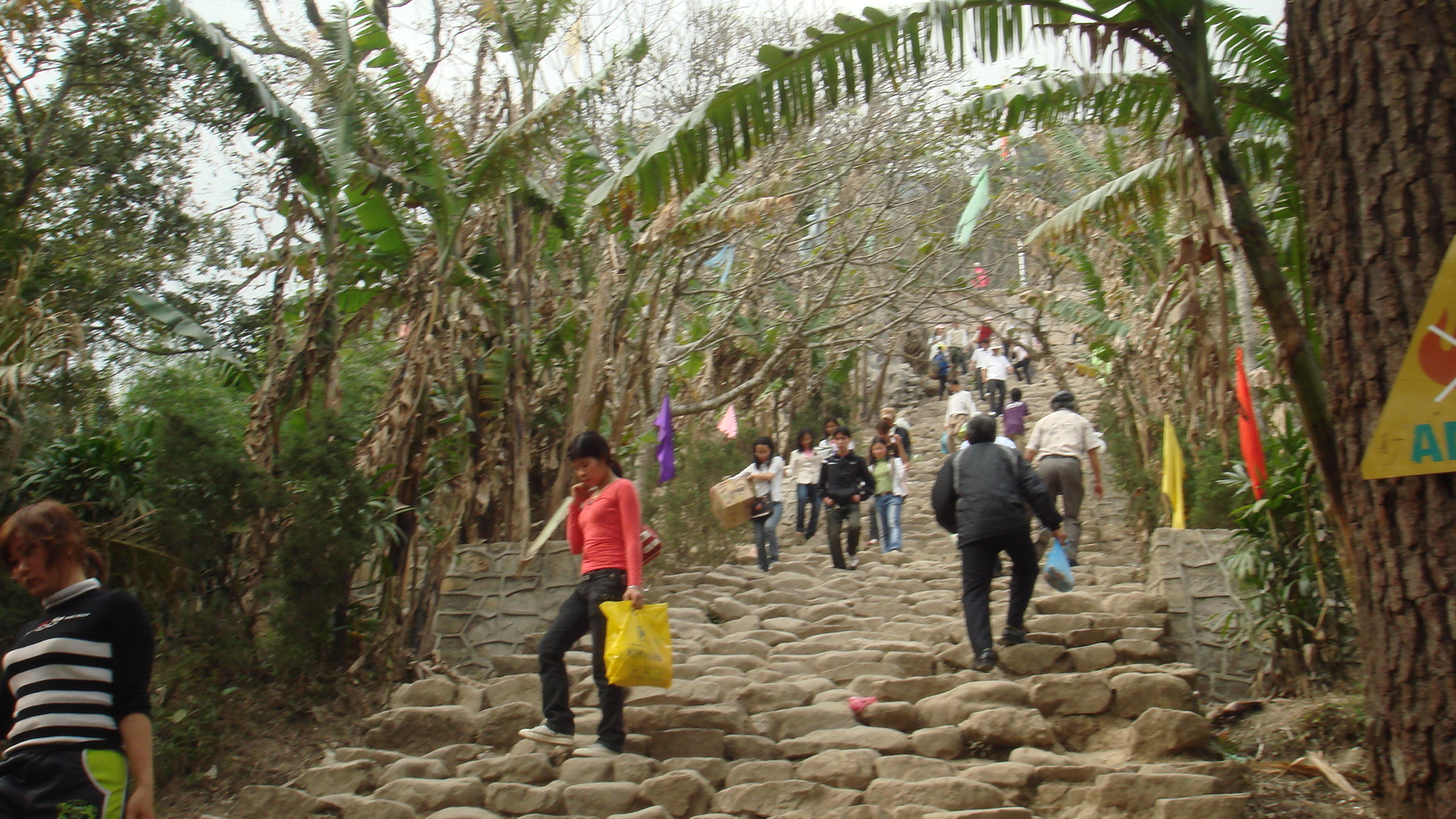
Path to Mount Yên Tử

According to the General Statistics Office of the Government of Vietnam, the population of Quảng Ninh city, as of 2025, was 1,523,400 people with a density of 244 persons per km^{2} over a total land area of 6,231.27 square kilometres (2,405.91 mi^{2}). The male population during this period was 705,510 while the female population was 691,010. The rural population was 428,270 (30.67% of total population) against an urban population of 968,260 (69.33% of total population).

The dominant religious beliefs are of Buddhists, Christians and ancestor worship in addition to other folk beliefs.

== Fauna and flora ==
Identified floral species are numbered at 1,027 of 6 phyla, while faunal species are 120.

There are species of fish in the Gulf of Bắc Bộ. There are pearly mussels, stockfish, sea turtles and lobsters, while along the coastline, oysters and edible seaweed abound. These fish resources of the sea have been a source of income for the residents of Quảng Ninh.

There are fruit trees, lumber trees and industrial plants. The area for fruit trees in the former Đông Triều provincial city totals around 30 km^{2}. Formerly in Quảng Ninh, there was more diverse wood available, in particular ironwood and teak trees. Later, there are mainly pine trees. In mountainous areas, there are a variety of trees and plants, providing spices and traditional medicines.

== Economy ==
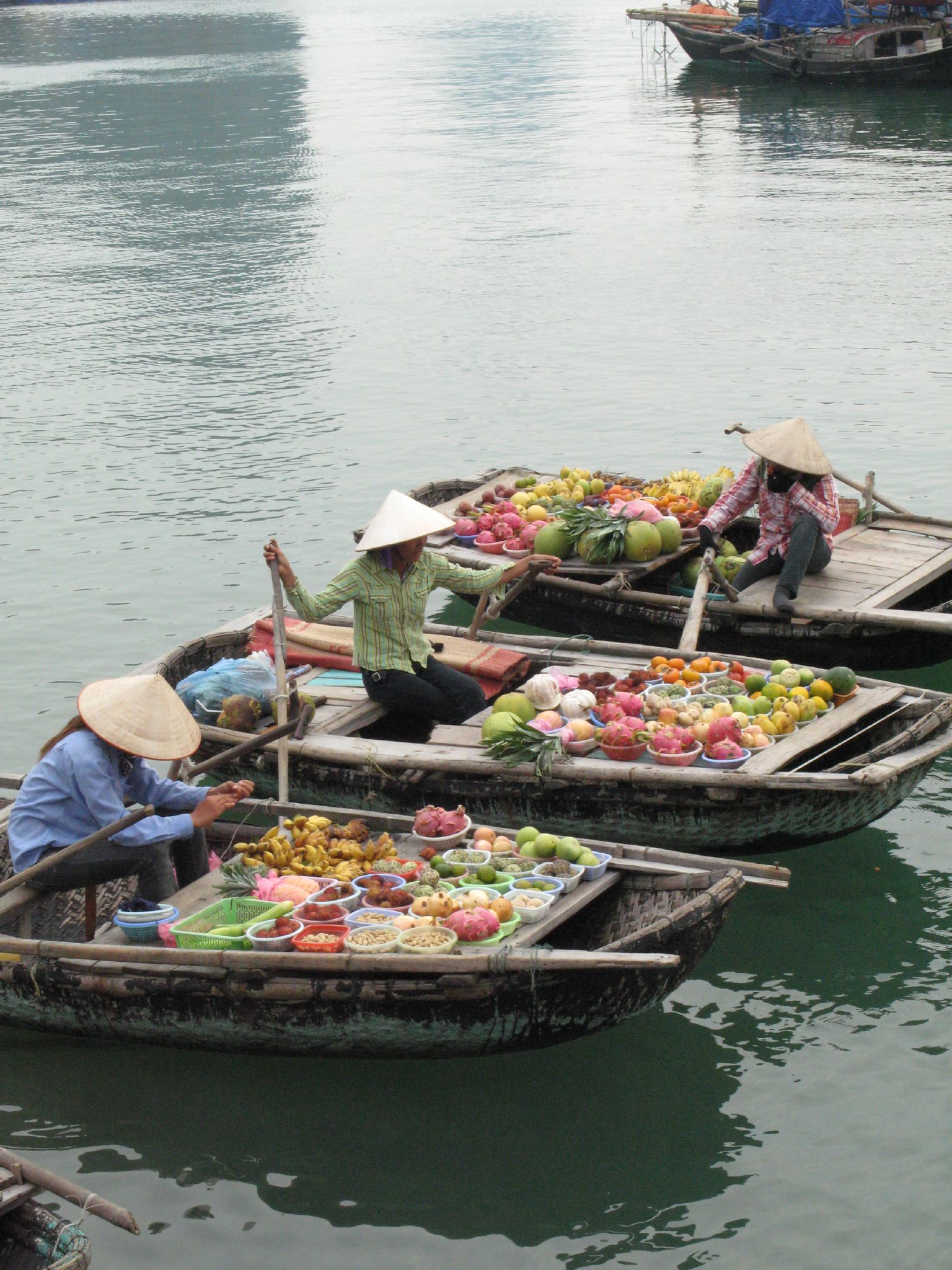
Vendors in Hạ Long Bay

The People's Committee of the former Quảng Ninh province in 2007 approved proposals for development plans up to 2020. Mineral extraction industries are being developed. Special economic zones are being created and the plans envisage making the province a modern industrial province by 2015. The two economic development zones under development are the Mong Cai Border Gate Economic Zone and the Van Don Economic Zone. Tourism is also a sector of economic development, which has been given priority. Quảng Ninh has targeted to become a regional high-quality tourism center and an economic growth hub in the North with synchronized socio-economic and technical infrastructure and improved living conditions.

Some of the economic indicators in agriculture, industries and other sectors are the following. There are 1,440 farms as against the national number of 120,699

The output value of agriculture produce at constant 1994 prices in the province was 952.5 billion đồngs against the national value of 156,681.9 billion đồngs.

The province produced 227,700 tonnes of cereals as against the national production of 43.68 million tonnes.

The per capita production of cereals in the district was 205.2 kg as against the national figure of 501.8 kg in 2008.

In 2007, the industrial output of the province was 37,987.5 billion VND against the national output of 1.47 million billion VND.

On Vietnam's Provincial Competitiveness Index 2023, a tool for evaluating the business environment in Vietnam's provinces, Quang Ninh received a score of 71.25. This was a decrease from 2022 in which the province received a score of 72.95. In 2023, the province received its highest scores on the 'time costs' and 'business support policy' criteria and lowest on 'labour policy' and 'policy bias'.

== Historical places ==
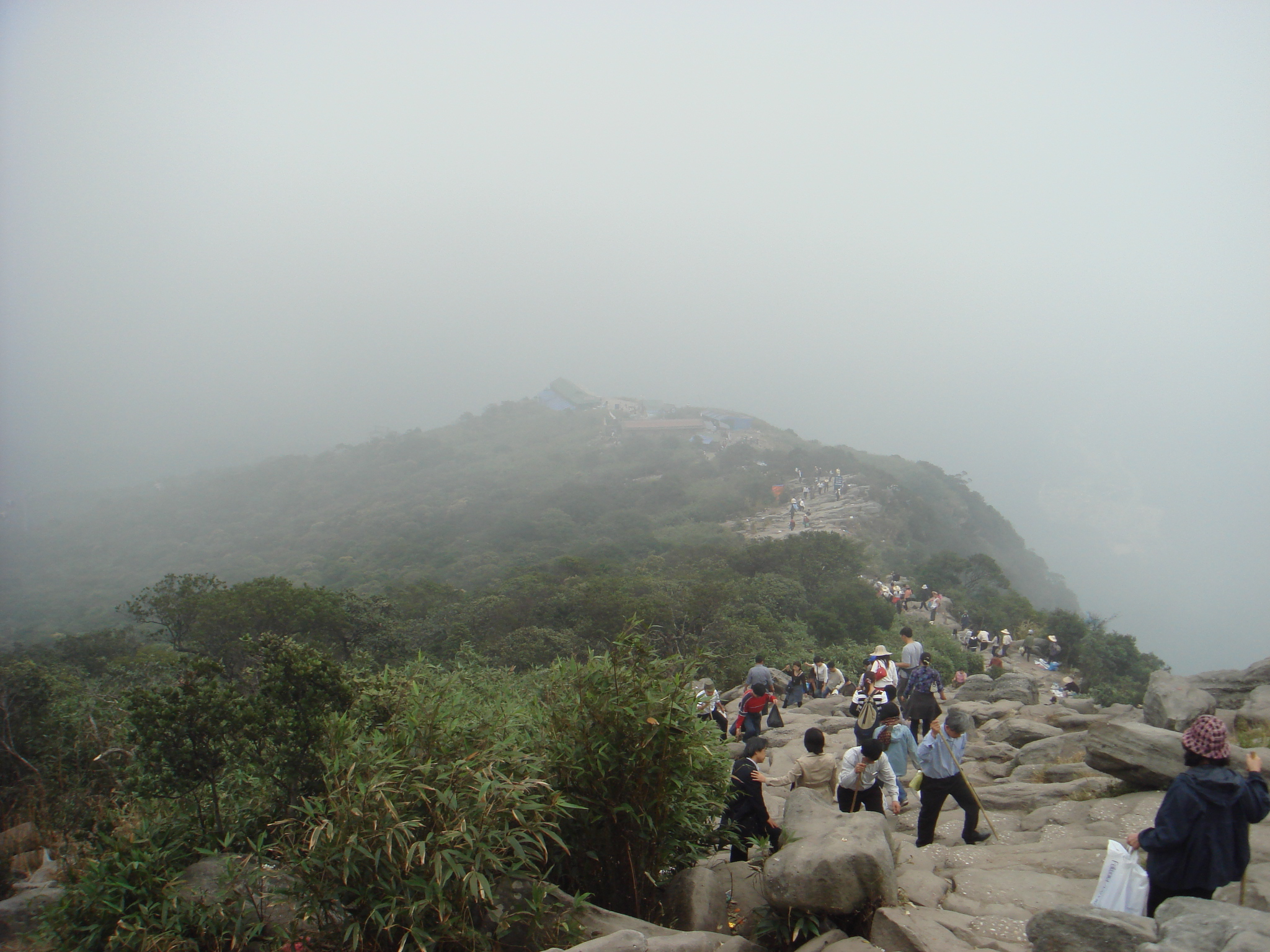
Yên Tử Mountains

The city has number of attractions connected with the landforms such as the mountains and the sea or the bay, religious places of worship and festivals. Some of these are:

=== Mountains ===
Bài Thơ Mountain is a limestone mountain formation, which rises to a height of 106 meters, in the middle of Hạ Long provincial city. It appears like a castle with three towers of the undulating rock. Another mountain is the That Bai Tho Mountain, which was earlier called the Transmission Mount (Then). It has historical linkage to the visit of Emperor Lê Thánh Tông to the provincial city in 1468. The emperor was moved by the beauty of the mountain covered with clouds, called it a young fairy of Hạ Long and got a poem written on it and engraved on the southern side of the rocky cliff. In 1729, Lord Trịnh Cương commissioned a painting and poem on Emperor Lê Thánh Tông on this mountain, hence the name (Bài thơ means poem in Vietnamese).

=== Temples ===
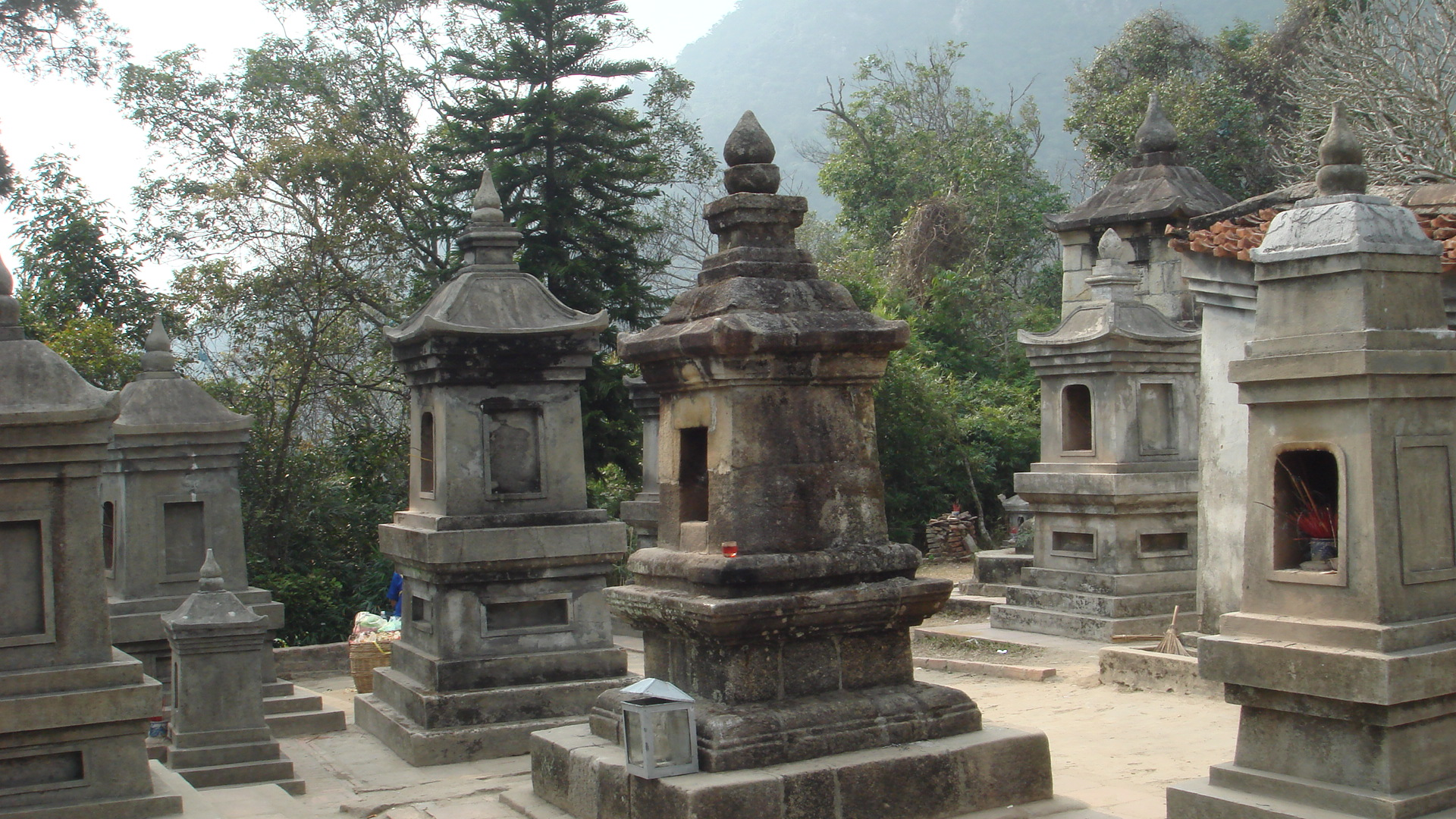
Hue Quang Tower Garden, which preserves the relics of the Zen monks, monks and nuns of Trúc Lâm.

Two temples in the city are the Cửa Ông Temple located on a mountain overlooking low Bai Tu Long Bay, and the Tien Temple located next to the headquarters of People's Committee of Cam La commune.

Quảng Ninh city is home to several Buddhist pagodas include The Yên Tử Pagoda Complex, Ba Vàng Pagoda, Long Tiên Pagoda, Ngọa Vân Pagoda.

==== Bạch Đằng beach ====
Bạch Đằng beach is a historical site which commemorates the 13th-century victory of Trần Quốc Tuấn over the Mongols, who had invaded the country with 30,000 troops.

== Transport ==
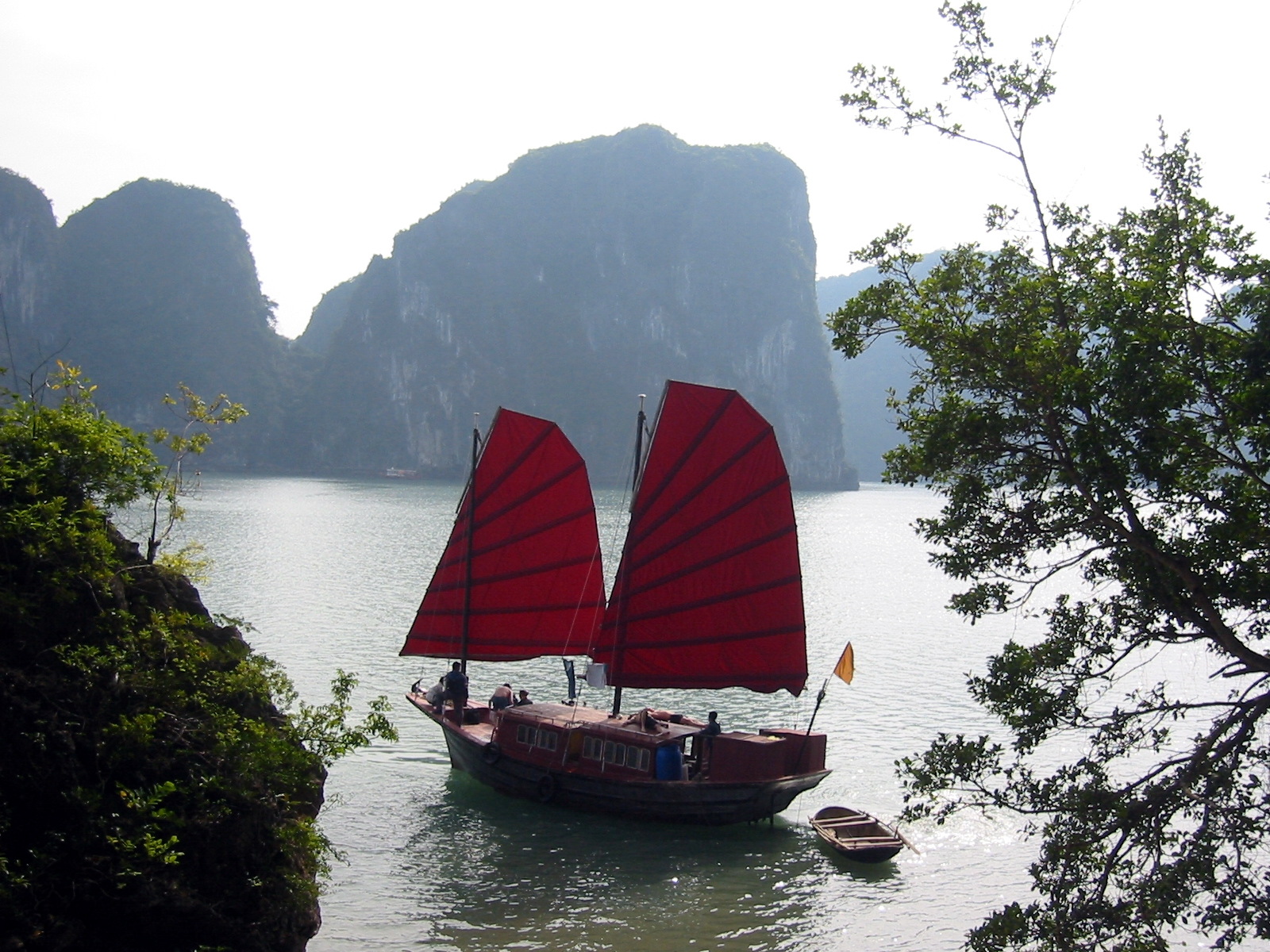
Junk in the Hạ Long Bay

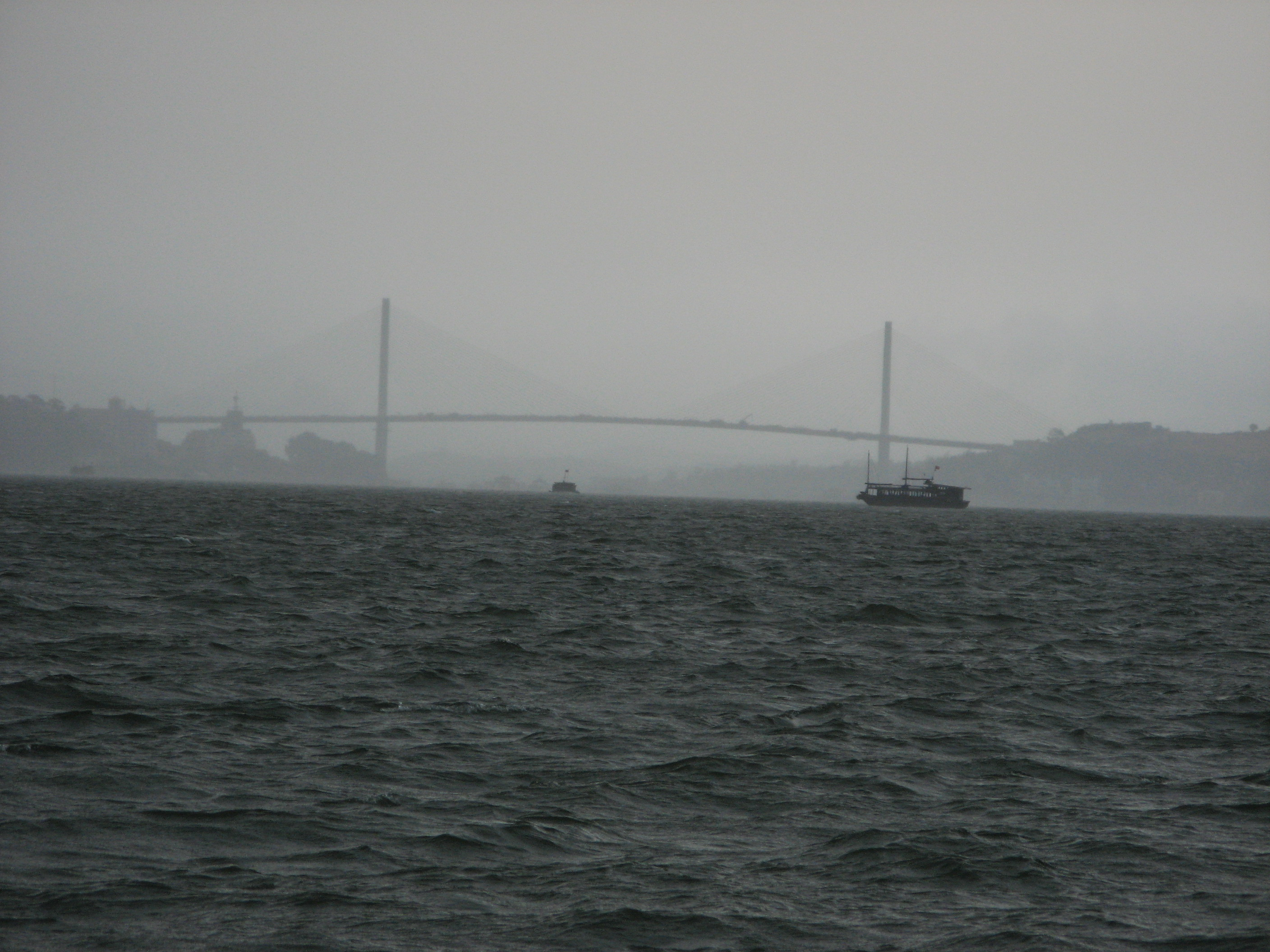
Bãi Cháy Bridge

The road network in the city consists of the National Highways No. 10, 18, and 48. Highway No. 10 links to Hanoi, Haiphong and other northern provinces. National Highway 4B connects the city with Lạng Sơn and Cao Bằng.

The Hanoi–Hạ Long (Cai Lan port) railway line has been improved. Rail links of 64 km length connect to industries in the city.

The water transport is provided by its rivers and the sea ports such as the Cai Lan port, the largest deep water port in North Vietnam that is under further expansion to handle cargo of 7–10 million tonnes per year. Another port is the Cu Ong port, which can handle ships of 65,000–70,000 DWT capacity. Other minor ports along the coastline of the city are the Bo, Cau Trang, B12, Mui Chua, Dien Cong, Bach Thai Buoi, Tien Yen and Dan Tien.
