= Hạ Long (city) =

Hạ Long Hồng Gai
- Provincial city (Class-1)
- Hạ Long City; Thành phố Hạ Long
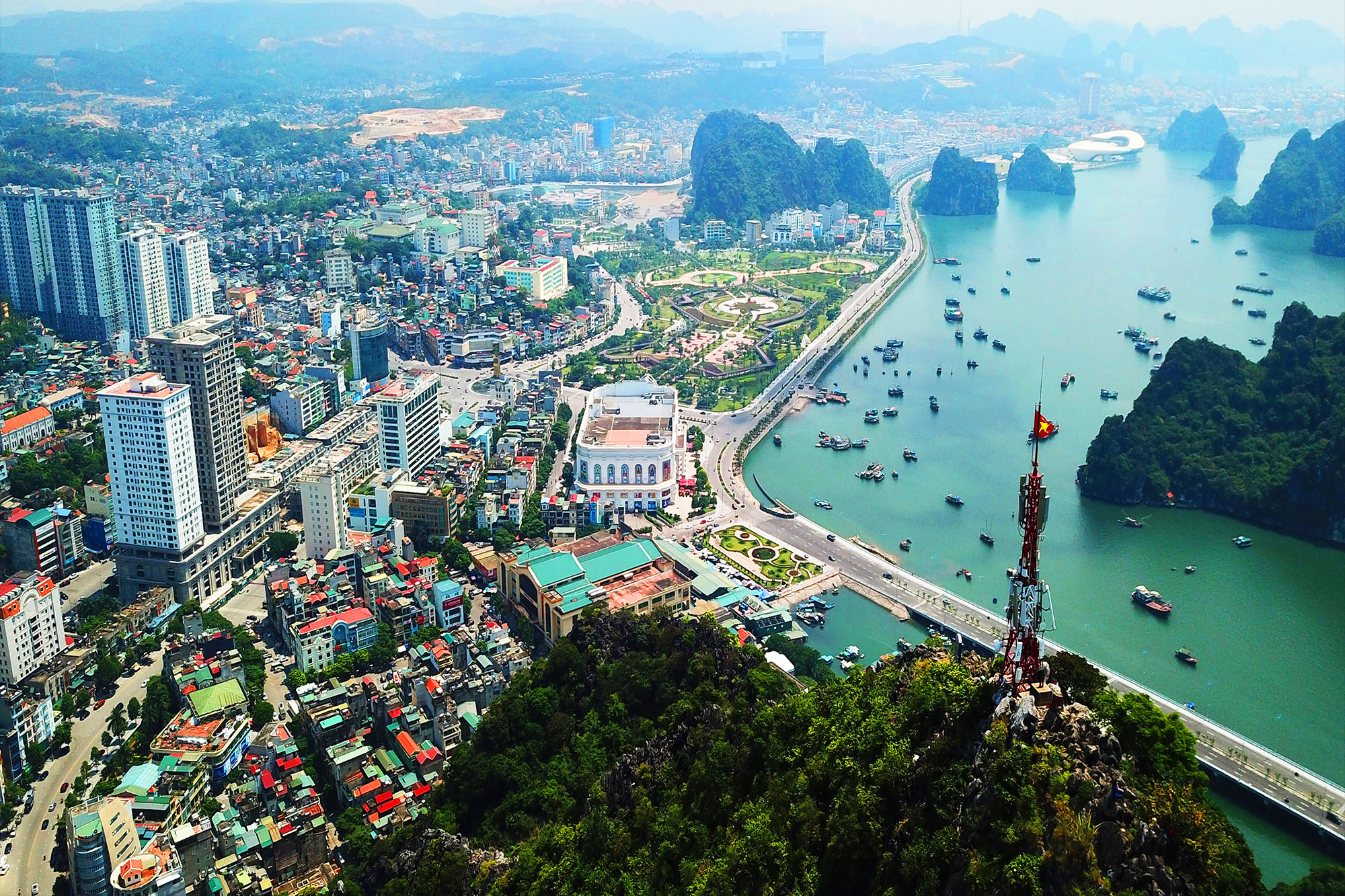
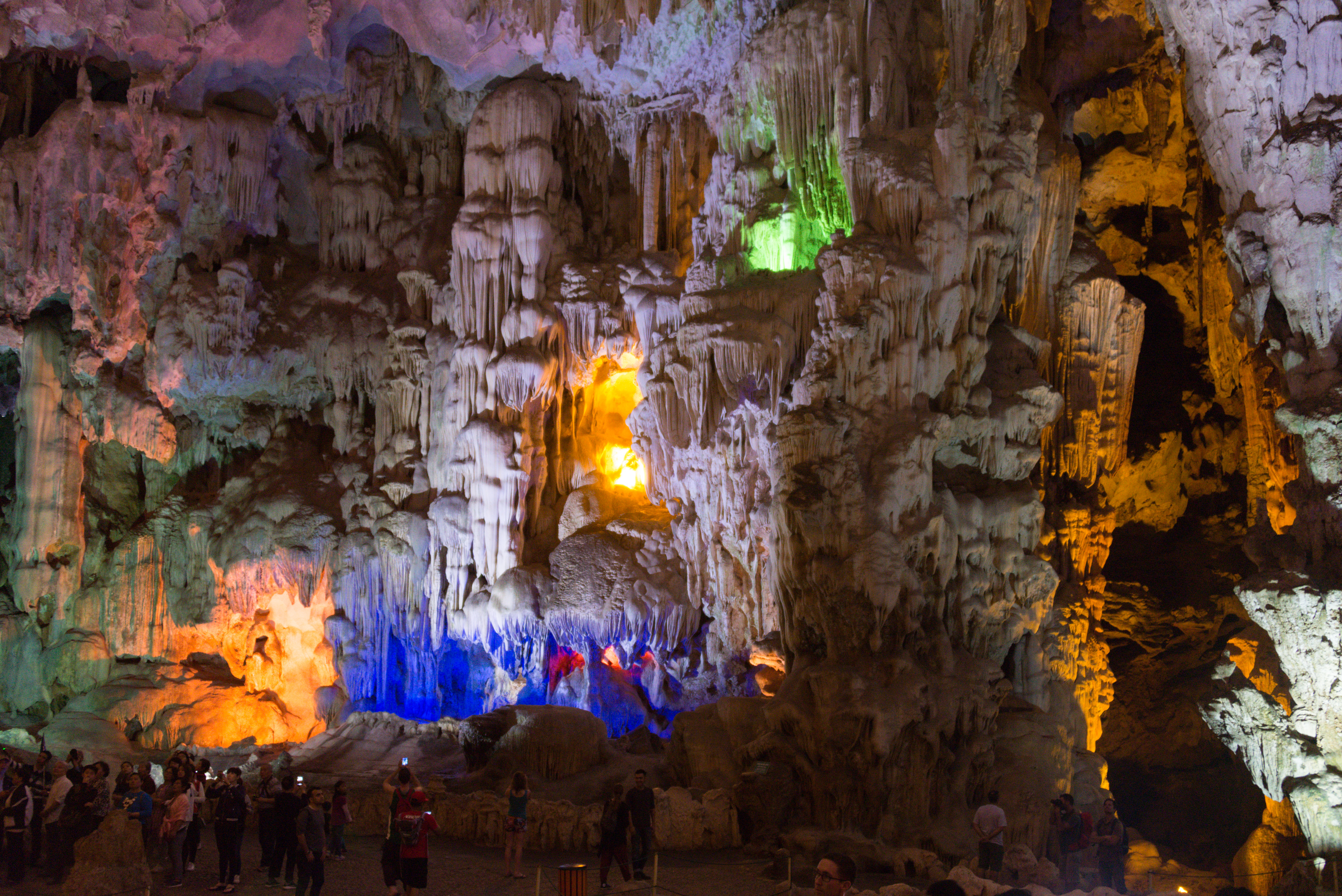
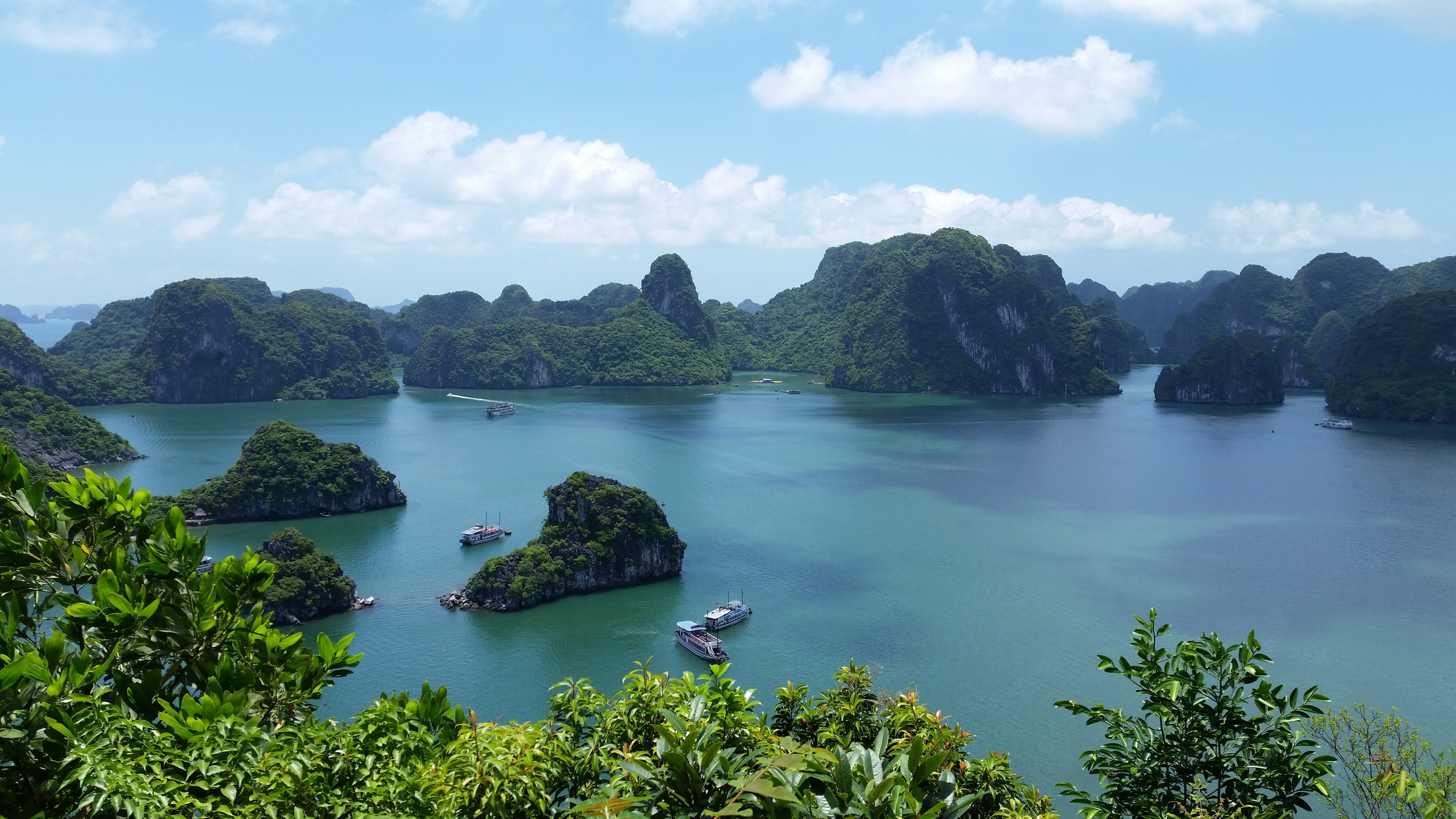
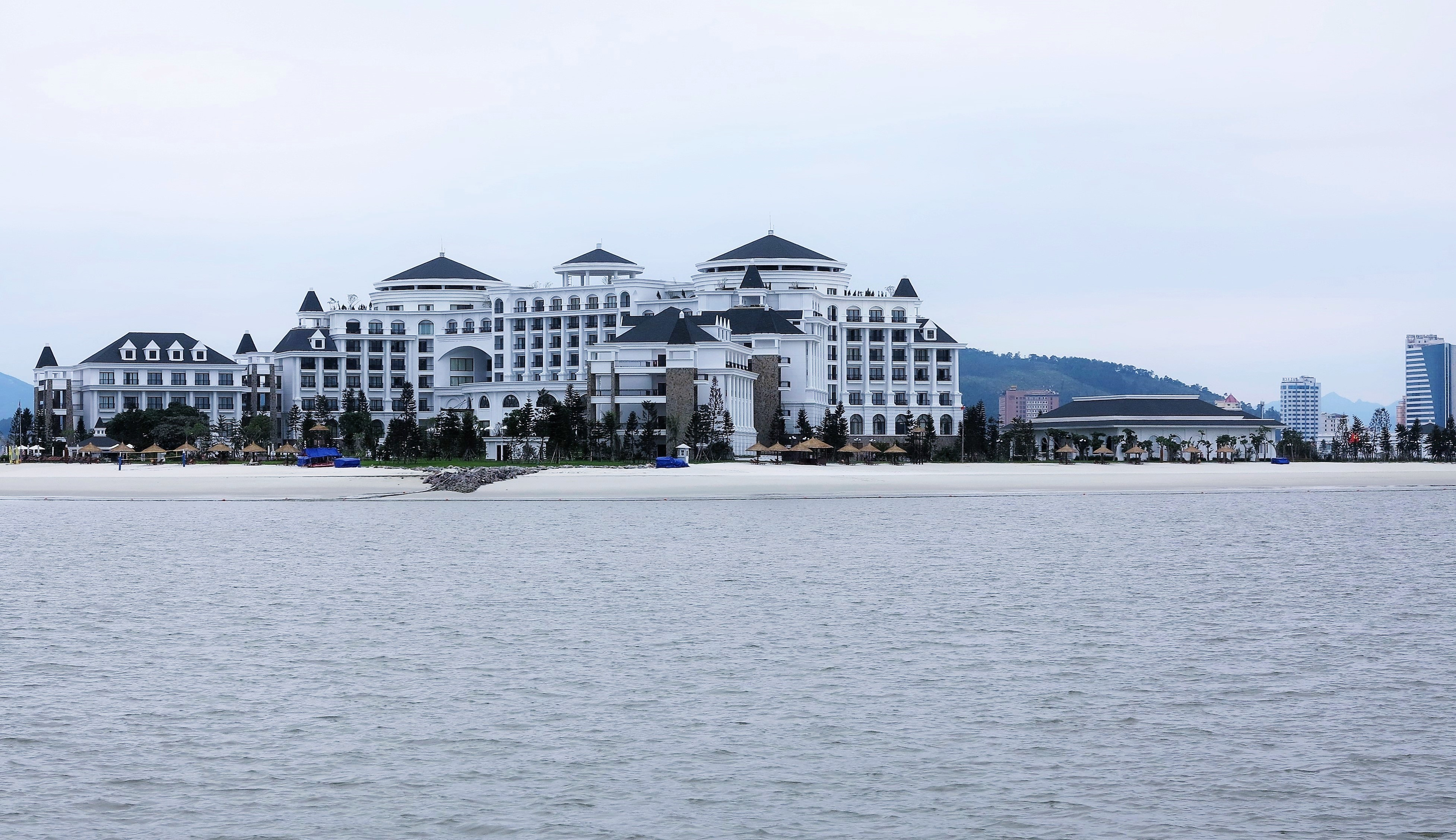
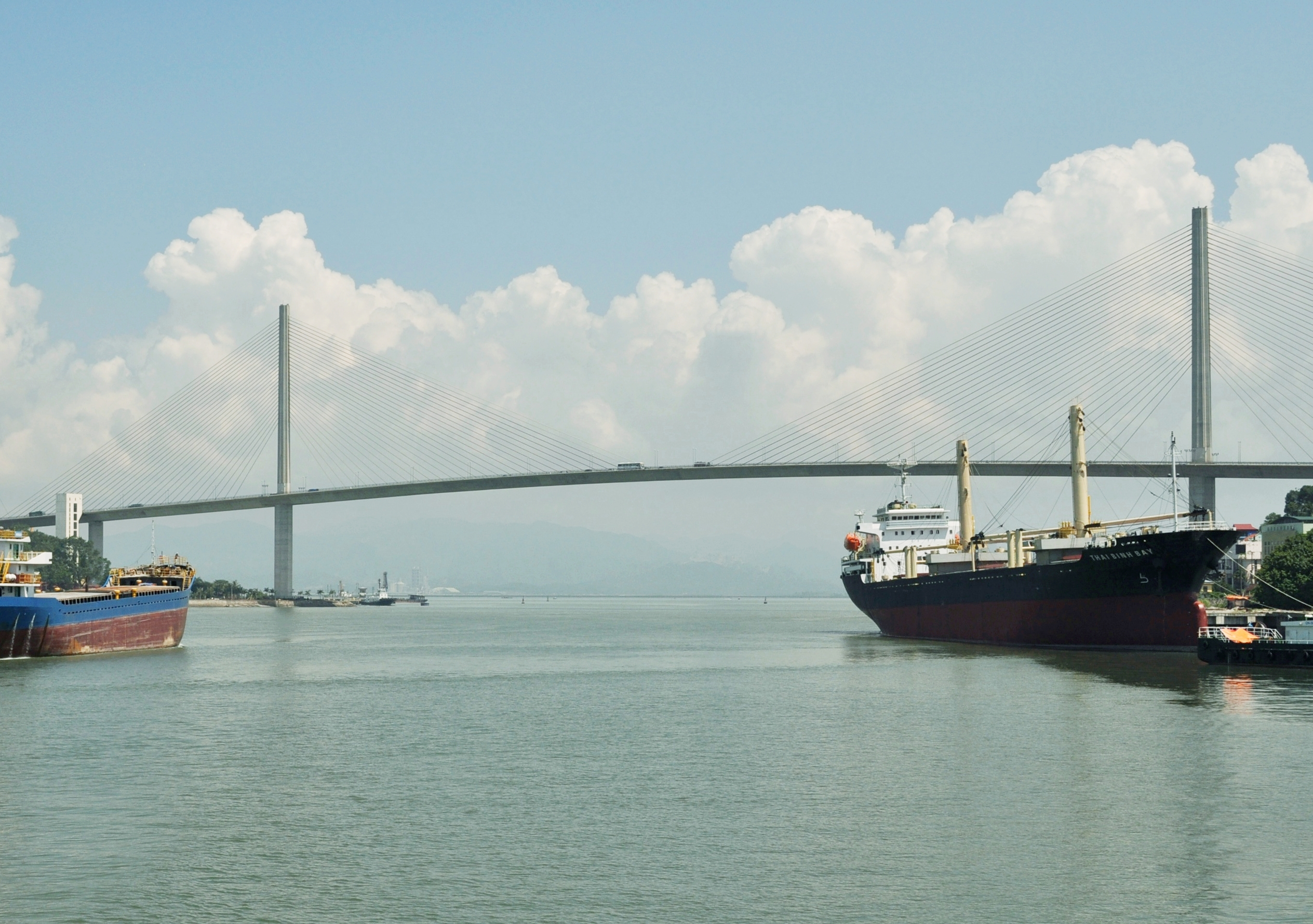
- From top to bottom, from left to right: a view of the city from Bài Thơ mountain, stalactites in Thiên Cung cave, Hạ Long Bay, resort on Rêu island in Bãi Cháy ward, Bãi Cháy Bridge

- Seal
- Interactive map of Hạ Long
- Location in Vietnam
- Coordinates: 20°57′N 107°05′E
- Country: Vietnam
- Province: Quảng Ninh

Government
  - Type: People's Committee and People's Council
  - Chairman of People's Council: Nguyễn Thế Thịnh
  - Chairman of People's Committee: Phạm Hồng Hà

Area
  - Total: 1,119.12 km^{2} (432.09 sq mi)

Population (2019 census)
  - Total: 270,054
  - Density: 241.309/km^{2} (624.988/sq mi)
- Climate: Cwa
- Website: halongcity.gov.vn

Hạ Long (Vietnamese: [hâːˀ lawŋm], transl. 'descending dragon') is a former first-class provincial city and capital city of Quảng Ninh province, Vietnam. It was founded in 1993, when the old capital, Hòn Gai, was merged with Bãi Cháy, the main tourist area. The city mainly lies on Hạ Long Bay, and is located at about 178 km (111 mi) east of Hà Nội. The city's population in 2019 was 270,054.

Hạ Long ceased to exist as a provincial city on 1 July 2025, following the elimination of district level units in Vietnam. Hạ Long ward was subsequently established on the territory of the former wards of Hồng Hải and Hồng Hà.

== Overview ==
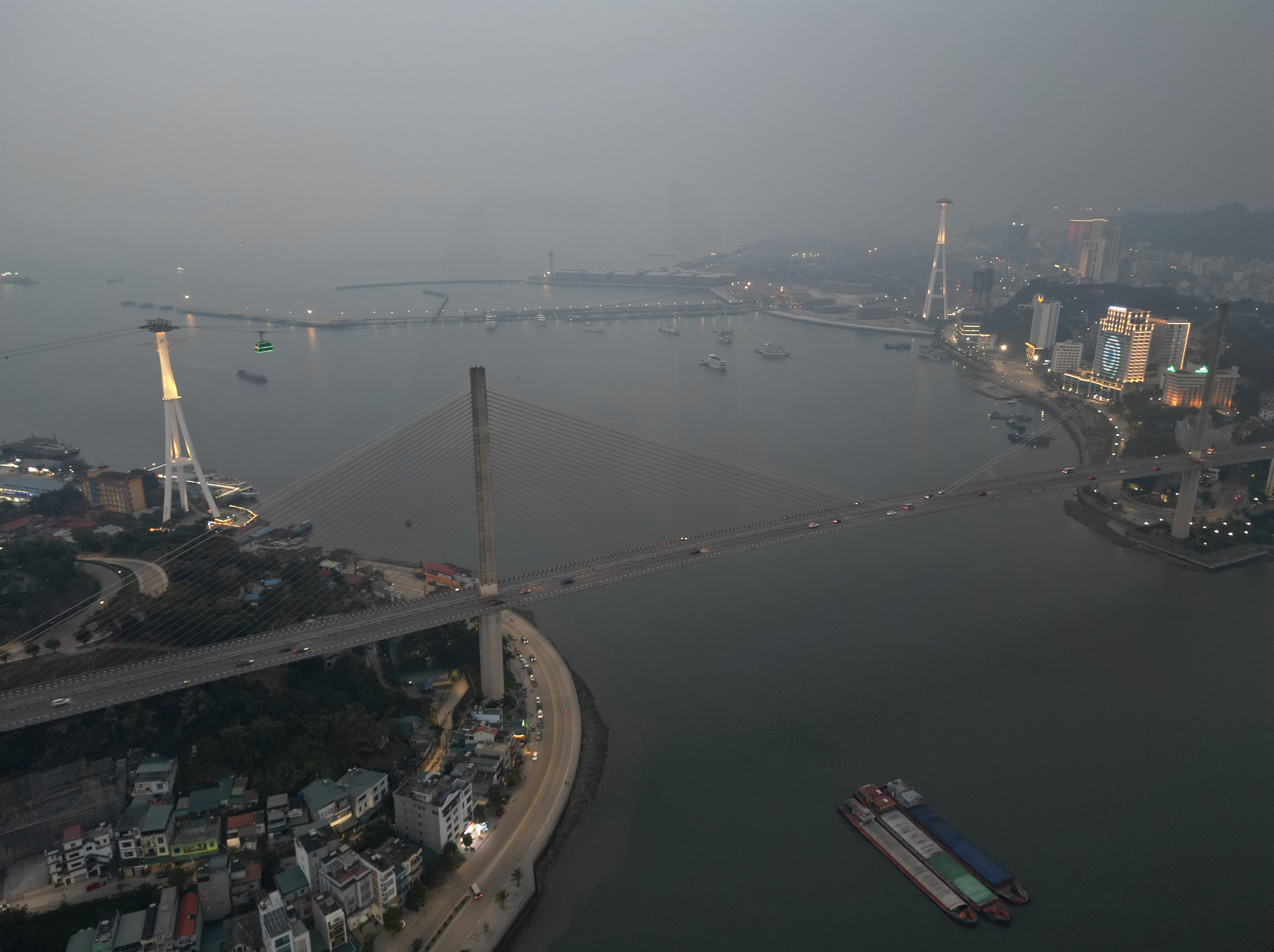
Drone shot of the Bridge of Bãi Cháy in 2023

Hạ Long's economy shifted its economic focus from coal mining to tourism in 2012, due to the large number of visitors drawn by the Hạ Long Bay every year. Hạ Long enjoys rapid growth not only in its own tourism sphere, but also as a destination upon the main pathway to southern China. In the 2007 Vietnam-China Business Forum, a $400 million deal was signed to build a highway linking Hạ Long and the border city of Móng Cái. The highway began construction in 2015 and was completed in 2022.

Hạ Long is divided into two parts. The eastern part, known colloquially as Hòn Gai, where most of the governing offices and industrial infrastructure are concentrated, is connected by a cable-stayed bridge to the western part, Bãi Cháy, known as an area for tourism.

== Location ==
Being a coastal city, Hạ Long bears unique potential as a tourist destination and a seaport. Its land lies along 50 km of the shore of Hạ Long Bay. Hạ Long is 160 km to the north-east from Hà Nội, 60 km to the East from Hải Phòng, and 180 km to the south-west from Móng Cái international border gate, and it is bounded by the Gulf of Tonkin to the south. Hạ Long has a strategic location for the economic development and security of the region and the country.

== History ==
Mankind has been present in Hạ Long for a long time. Archaeologists and historians concluded that during the Stone Age, there had been three cultures known as Soi Nhụ, Hạ Long and Cái Bèo, affirming that the bay and its surrounding areas were one of the cradles of mankind. The heartland of today's Hạ Long is formerly a fishing village named Bãi Hàu (lit. 'Oyster coast'). By the beginning of the Dynasty of Nguyễn, it was renamed to Mẫu Lệ. The current city was then part of Hoành Bồ.

In 1883, during French rule, the French carried out coal mining in the mines on the bay's coast. As many islands were populated with hemp, the French called them Ile des brouilles or a name translated from "Hòn Gai" to "Hòn Gay", and later renamed them Hòn Gai. According to the researchers, "Hòn Gai" is a deviation from the place of the French Red Sea at that time. The "H" is a silent sound when spoken in French. During this period, Hòn Gai was an administrative unit of Quảng Yên province.

After the August Revolution in 1945, this township became the capital town of the huge Hồng Gai mine area. Later in 1946, the French retook Hòn Gai. After the 1954 Geneva Conference, Hòn Gai became the capital of the special district of Hồng Quảng. On October 30, 1963, the Vietnamese government combined Hải Ninh province and Hồng Quảng to establish the province of Quảng Ninh, with Hòn Gai becoming its capital, and the province's boundaries being expanded. The Hòn Gai town center provided coal for all industrial zones of North Vietnam. It was also one of the gateways that lead to China, and as such, it was frequently targeted by U.S. forces during the Vietnam War. The Bãi Cháy ferry line (decommissioned in 2007 and replaced by the Bãi Cháy Bridge) was the most important transportation hub, was the target of many U.S. bombardments, and was awarded Hero of the People's Armed Forces three times.

On December 27, 1993, the government issued Decree No. 102/CP, where Hòn Gai officially gained city status and was renamed to Hạ Long, while also incorporating Bãi Cháy into its territory.

On December 17, 2019, the city's committee announced its intention to incorporate Hoành Bồ into its territory.

== Climate ==
Climate data for Hạ Long (Bãi Cháy)
Month	Jan	Feb	Mar	Apr	May	Jun	Jul	Aug	Sep	Oct	Nov	Dec	Year
Record high °C (°F)	28.8 (83.8)	29.5 (85.1)	32.0 (89.6)	34.6 (94.3)	36.1 (97.0)	37.3 (99.1)	37.9 (100.2)	36.5 (97.7)	36.3 (97.3)	34.1 (93.4)	33.8 (92.8)	29.7 (85.5)	37.9 (100.2)
Mean daily maximum °C (°F)	19.3 (66.7)	19.7 (67.5)	22.0 (71.6)	26.1 (79.0)	30.1 (86.2)	31.5 (88.7)	31.7 (89.1)	31.3 (88.3)	30.7 (87.3)	28.8 (83.8)	25.5 (77.9)	21.7 (71.1)	26.5 (79.7)
Daily mean °C (°F)	16.2 (61.2)	17.0 (62.6)	19.5 (67.1)	23.4 (74.1)	26.9 (80.4)	28.4 (83.1)	28.6 (83.5)	27.9 (82.2)	27.1 (80.8)	25.0 (77.0)	21.5 (70.7)	17.9 (64.2)	23.3 (73.9)
Mean daily minimum °C (°F)	14.0 (57.2)	15.2 (59.4)	17.8 (64.0)	21.5 (70.7)	24.6 (76.3)	26.0 (78.8)	26.2 (79.2)	25.4 (77.7)	24.4 (75.9)	22.2 (72.0)	18.7 (65.7)	15.3 (59.5)	20.9 (69.6)
Record low °C (°F)	4.6 (40.3)	5.3 (41.5)	7.1 (44.8)	11.4 (52.5)	15.9 (60.6)	18.4 (65.1)	21.4 (70.5)	21.1 (70.0)	16.6 (61.9)	14.0 (57.2)	9.0 (48.2)	1.7 (35.1)	1.7 (35.1)
Average rainfall mm (inches)	27.7 (1.09)	24.5 (0.96)	42.9 (1.69)	86.3 (3.40)	183.2 (7.21)	297.0 (11.69)	364.3 (14.34)	430.5 (16.95)	276.0 (10.87)	142.6 (5.61)	38.9 (1.53)	18.1 (0.71)	1,923 (75.71)
Average rainy days	7.6	10.4	14.3	11.4	12.0	15.5	16.5	18.7	14.1	9.2	5.8	5.2	140.5
Average relative humidity (%)	80.4	84.0	87.1	86.5	83.3	83.8	83.6	85.6	82.5	78.5	76.7	76.3	82.4
Mean monthly sunshine hours	81.2	48.3	42.9	88.7	178.2	168.4	186.8	165.2	177.1	177.3	155.7	127.7	1,595.8
Source: Vietnam Institute for Building Science and Technology

== Culture and society ==
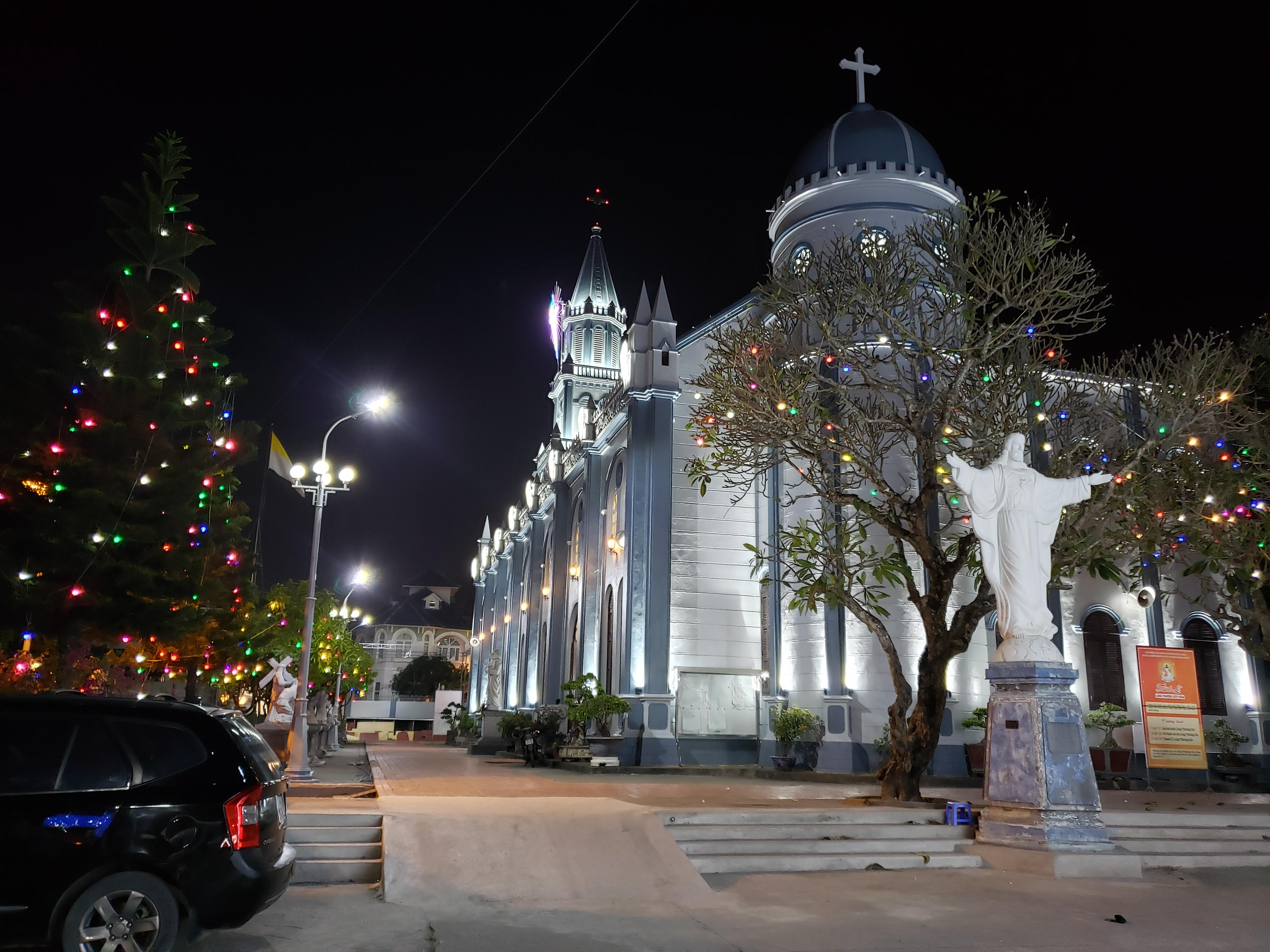
Hòn Gai Catholic Church in 2021

In the south of the city lies Mount Bài Thơ with its almost vertical seaward face, which was widely traversed by a number of historically known local poets. The limestone peak is rich in biodiversity and offers attractive views of the bay. Other places of interest include the Town of Cửa Vận, Hoàng Gia Park, Hạ Long Market, Bãi Cháy Trading Center, Quảng Ninh Museum and Library, Tuần Châu island, Vietnam-Japan Cultural House, Children's Cultural House, and the Sun World complex.

The city has an active Catholic church in its eastern part, Hòn Gai, on the hill near the main post office, which hosts masses every Sunday evening and on Christian holidays.

== Administrative divisions ==
The city is subdivided to 33 commune-level subdivisions, including 21 wards and 12 rural communes:

List of administrative divisions in Hạ Long

Name	Area (km^{2})	Population
Wards (21)
Bạch Đằng	1,7	9.334
Bãi Cháy	21	19.890
Cao Thắng	2,47	16.167
Cao Xanh	7,14	15.756
Đại Yên	45,37	7.900
Giếng Đáy	6,24	14.822
Hà Khánh	31,9	6.306
Hà Khẩu	8,28	11.588
Hà Lầm	4,01	9.807
Hà Phong	5,68	9.220
Hà Trung	5,68	7.442
Hà Tu	15,94	12.234
Hoành Bồ (formerly Trới township)
Hồng Gai	1,67	7.232
Hồng Hà	3,81	15.058
Hồng Hải	2,77	17.815
Hùng Thắng	5,97	5.730

Name	Area (km^{2})	Population
Trần Hưng Đạo	0,64	9.643
Việt Hưng	31,7	8.648
Tuần Châu	7,1	1.763
Yết Kiêu	1,57	9.440
Rural communes (12)
Bằng Cả
Dân Chủ
Đồng Lâm
Đồng Sơn
Hòa Bình
Kỳ Thượng
Lê Lợi
Quảng La
Sơn Dương
Tân Dân
Thống Nhất
Vũ Oai

== Economy ==
The city comprises five economic areas:

- Area 1: Trading, services including the wards of Yết Kiêu, Trần Hưng Đạo, Hồng Gai, Bạch Đằng, Hồng Hải, Hồng Hà, Cao Xanh and Cao Thắng.
- Area 2: Industry, forestry including the wards of Hà Trung, Hà Tu, Hà Khánh, Hà Lầm and Hà Phong.
- Area 3: Industry, seaports including north-west of Bãi Cháy, north of Việt Hưng, Giếng Đáy and Hà Khẩu.
- Area 4: Tourism, trading including south of Bãi Cháy, Hùng Thắng and Tuần Châu.
- Area 5: Agriculture, fishery including Việt Hưng and Đại Yên.

The structure of Hạ Long's economy includes: Industry-tourism, services, trading, agriculture, forestry and fishery. In 2002, city's GDP increased up to VND 1,6669.7 billion (pricing of 1994), accounting for 38% of the whole province, of which industry and construction occupy 31%, tourism and services occupy 53%; revenue collection accounts for 86.3% of the province. Annual GDP growth rate is 11.4%. GDP per capital reached US$1,070 in 2002, higher than per capita income of the country in that time.

Hạ Long City has 1,470 industry and handicrafts manufacturing units, including coal mining and processing, ship building, building materials, mechanic, wood processing, food, foodstuff and garment. There are 3 industrial zones: Cái Lân (with Cái Lân Port, one of the biggest ports in North Vietnam), Đồng Đăng and Hà Khánh.

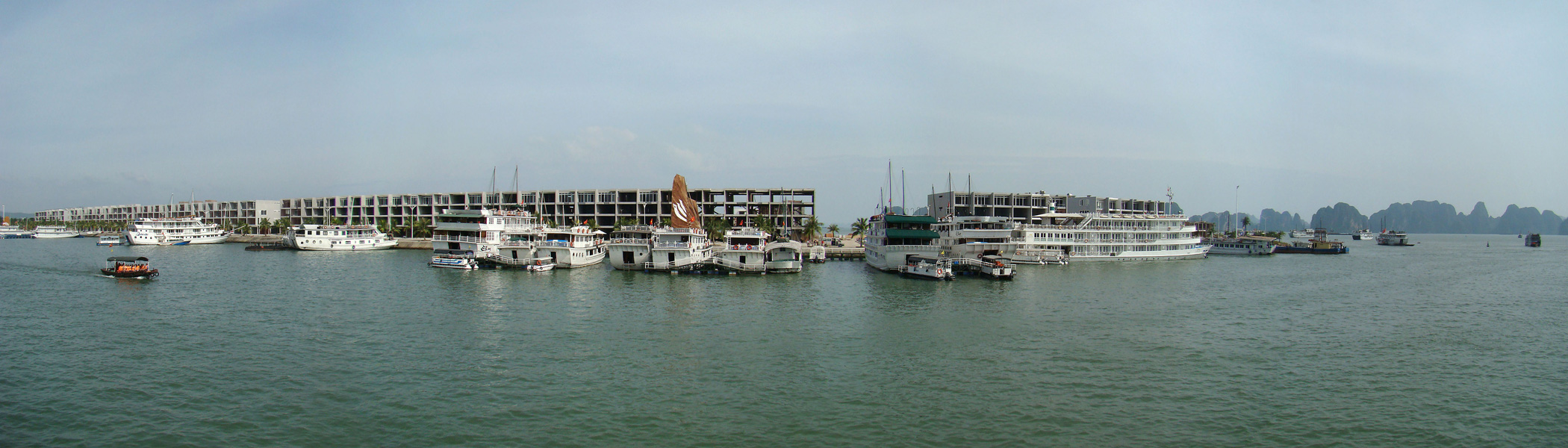
The Tuần Châu cruise ship port

== Transportation ==
The Van Don International Airport serves Hạ Long and the wider Quảng Ninh province. It is located approximately 50 km (31 mi) east of Hạ Long.

== Gallery ==
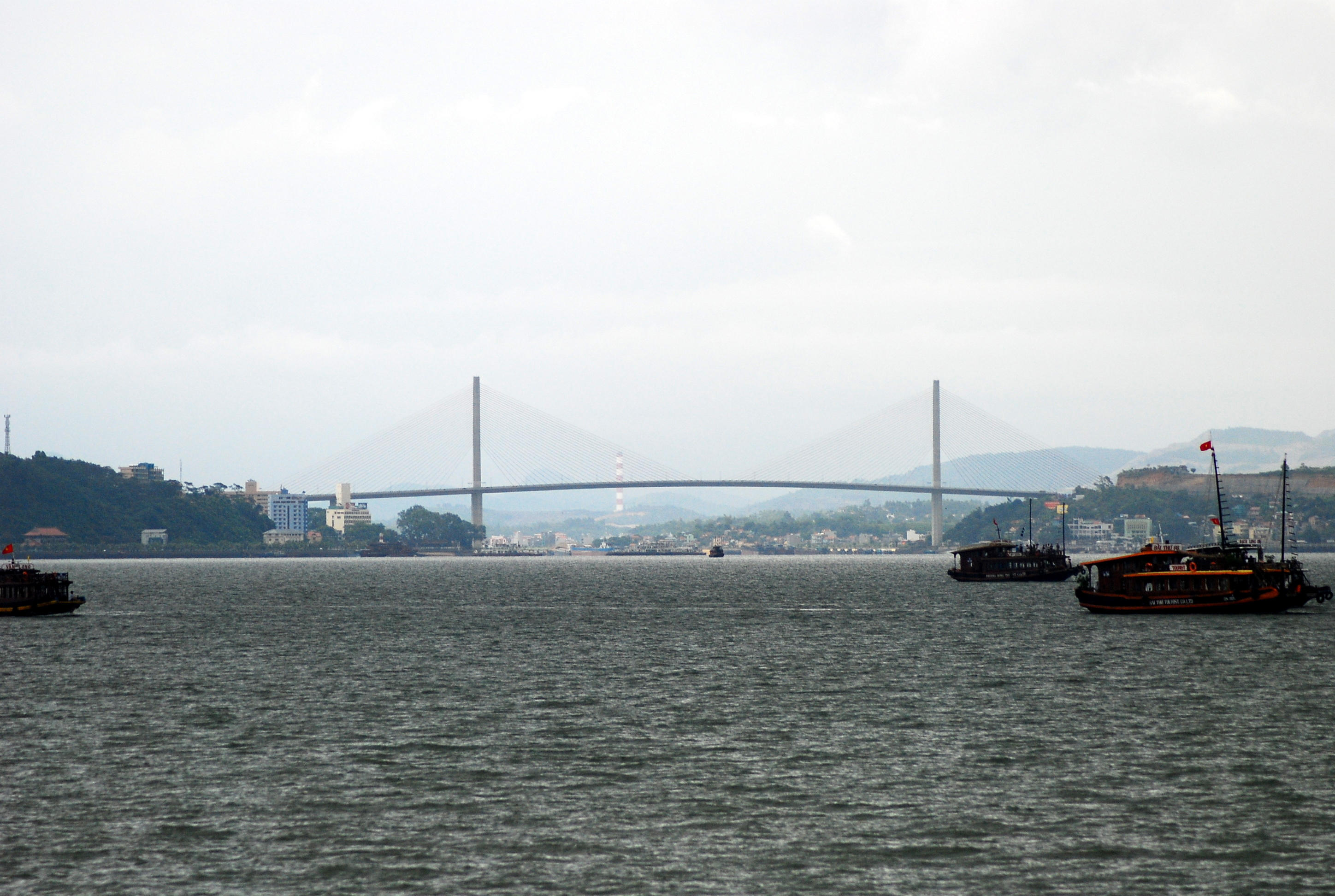
Bãi Cháy Bridge

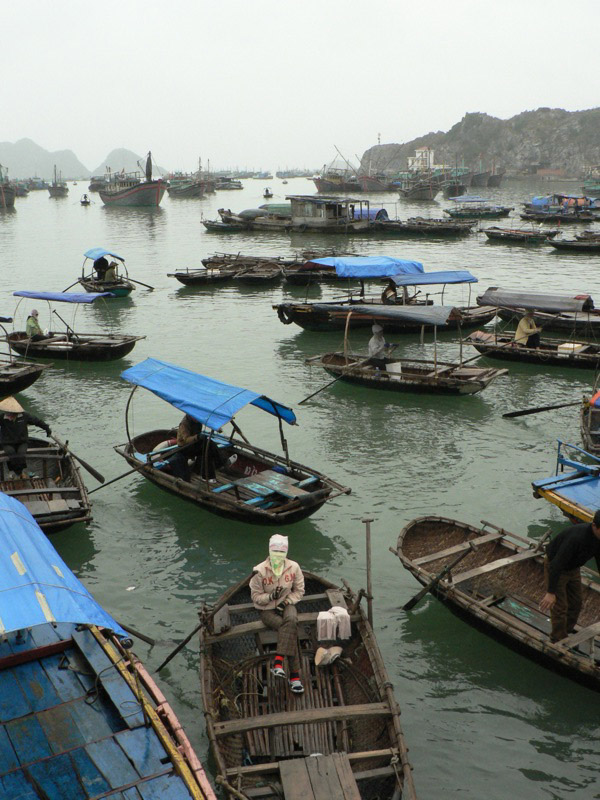
Fishers' boats on bay

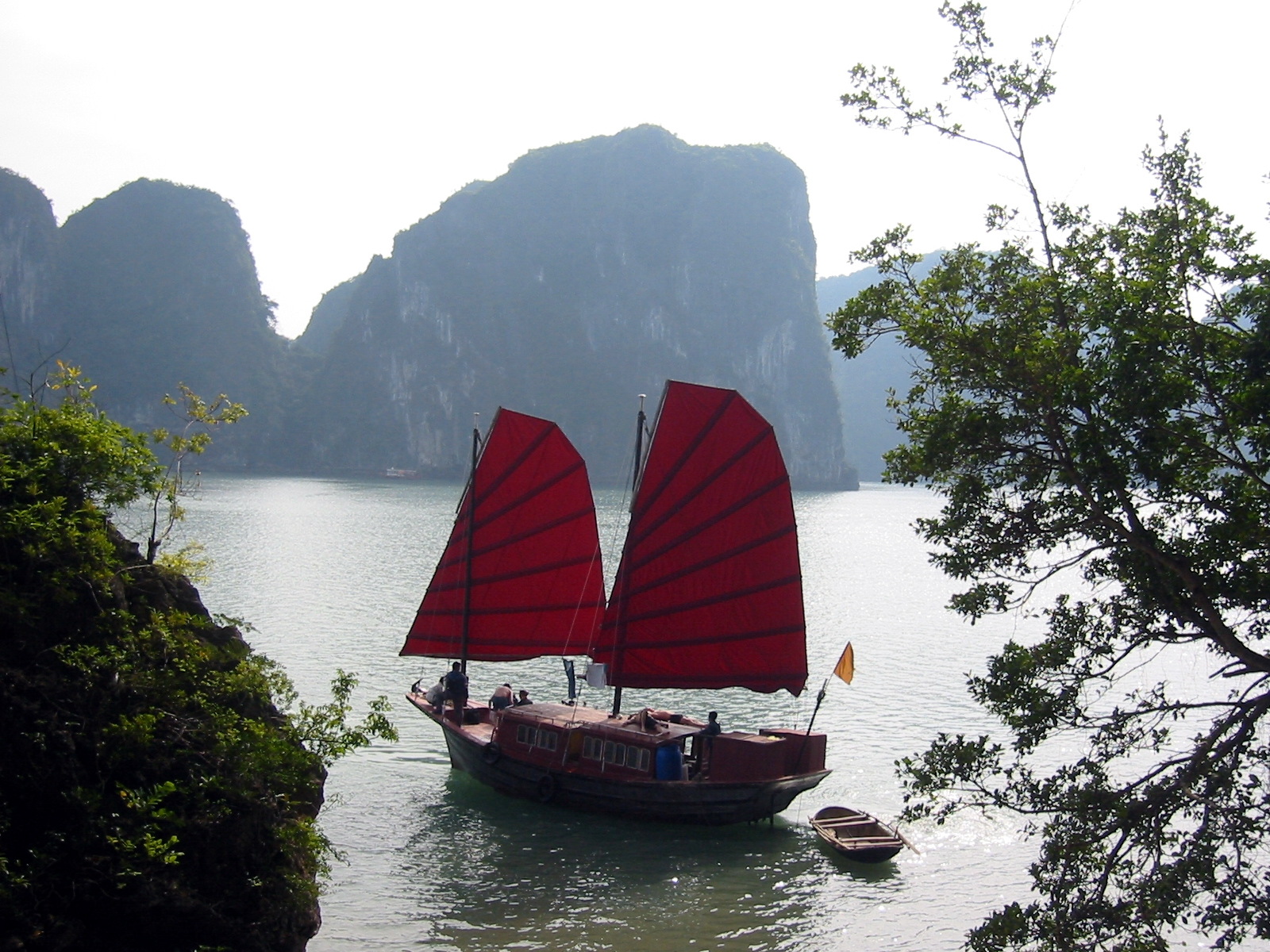
Traditional red sails on Hạ Long style's boat contrast with blue water surface

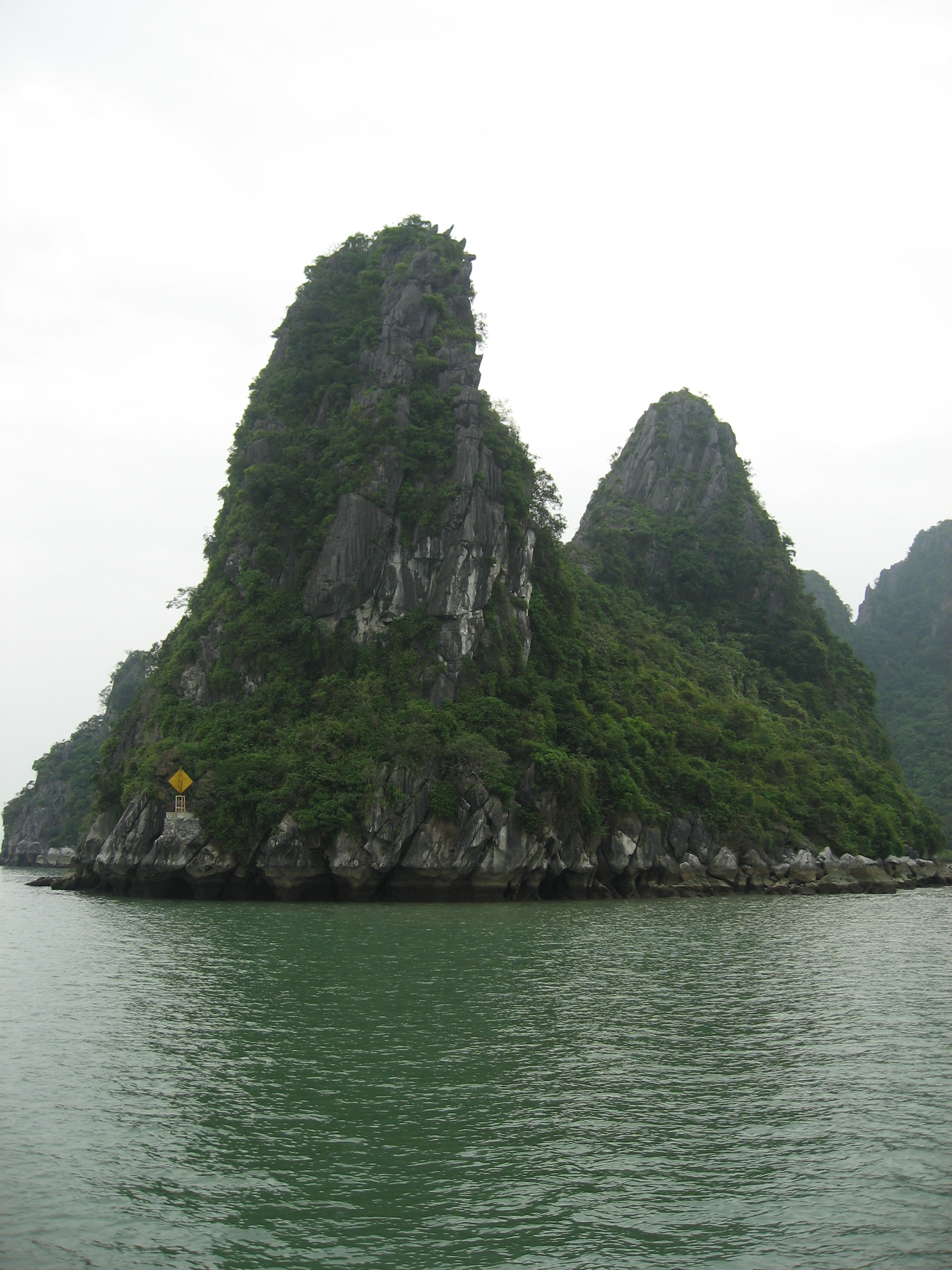
Limestone islands

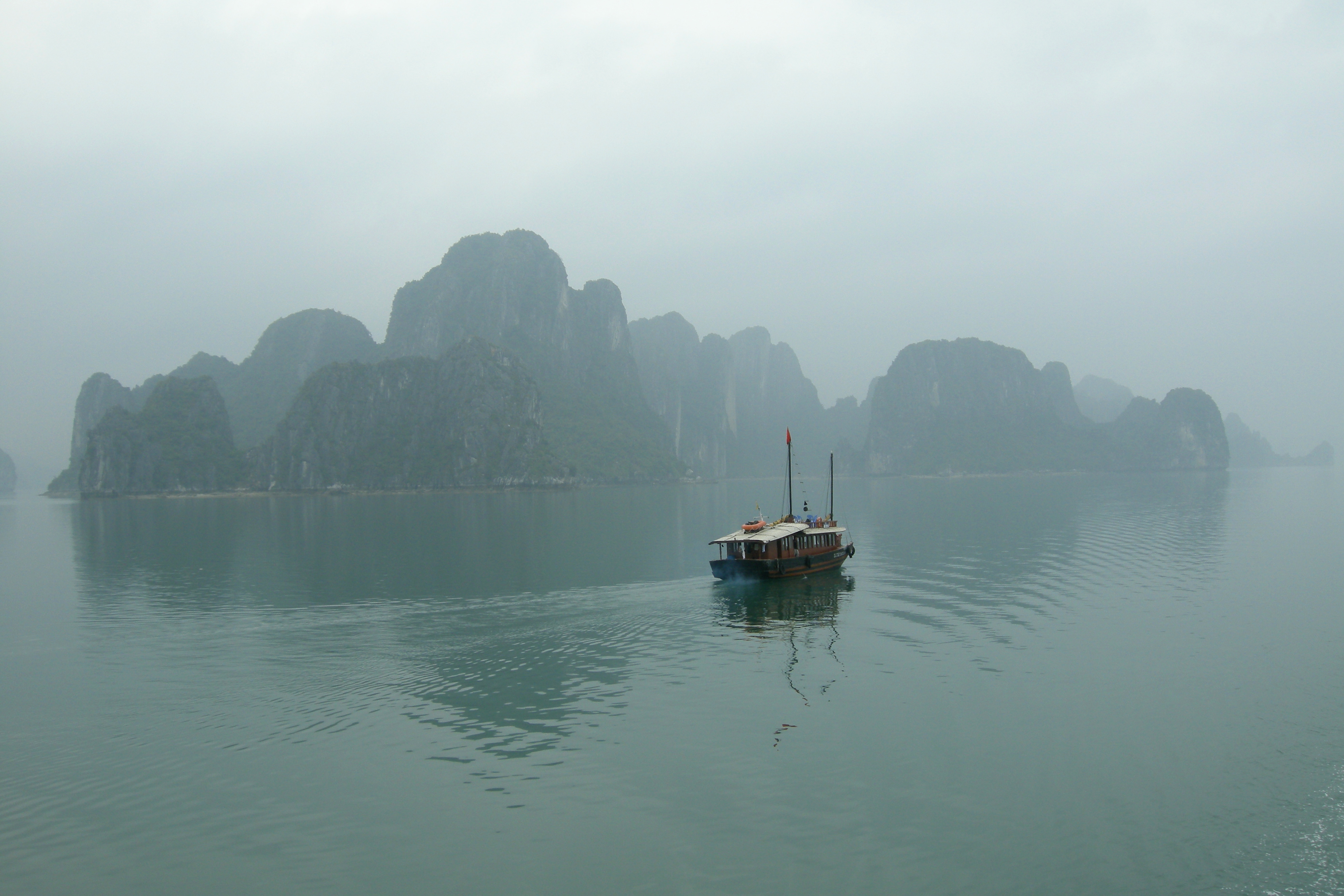
Sailing towards Ha Long Bay

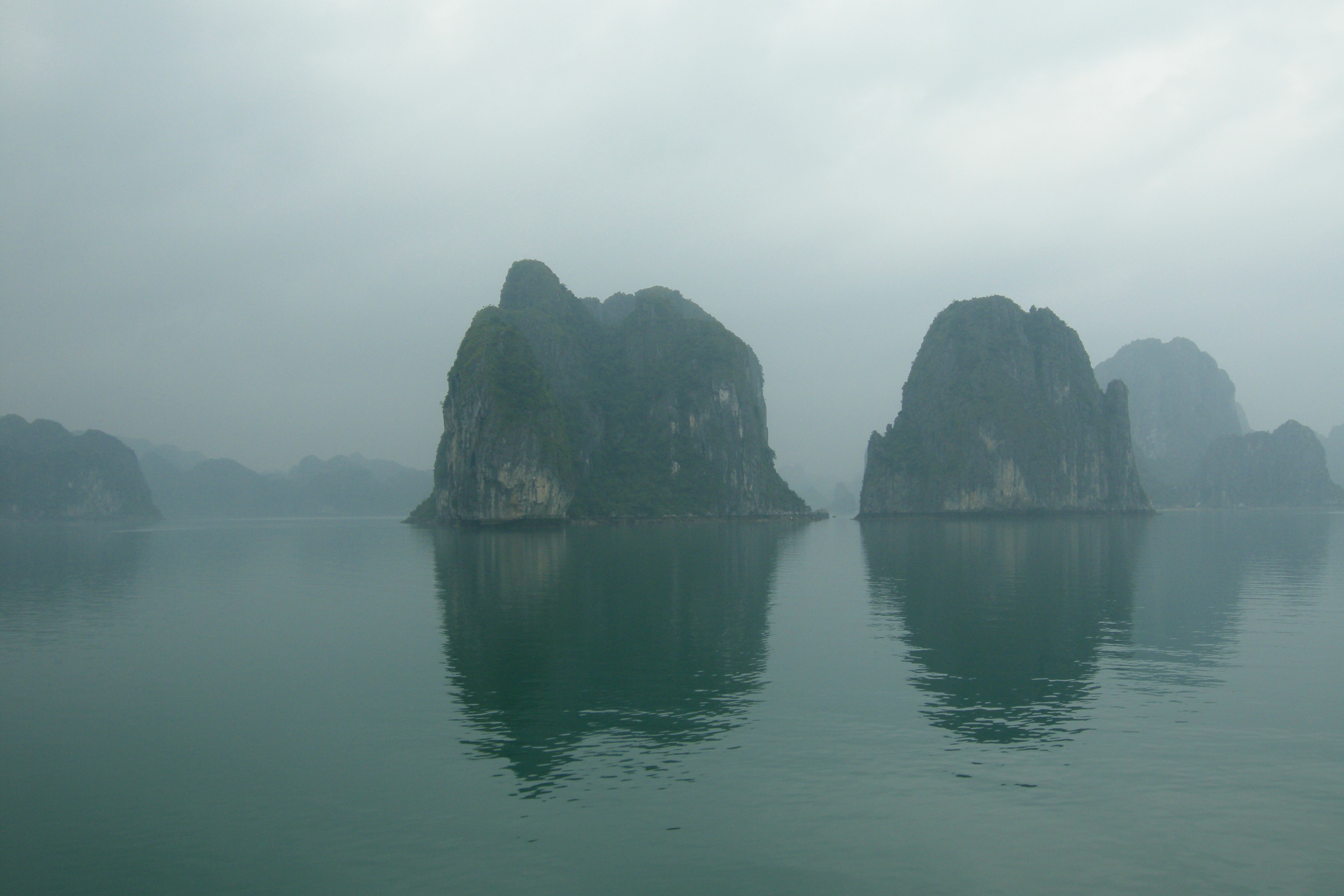
Ha Long

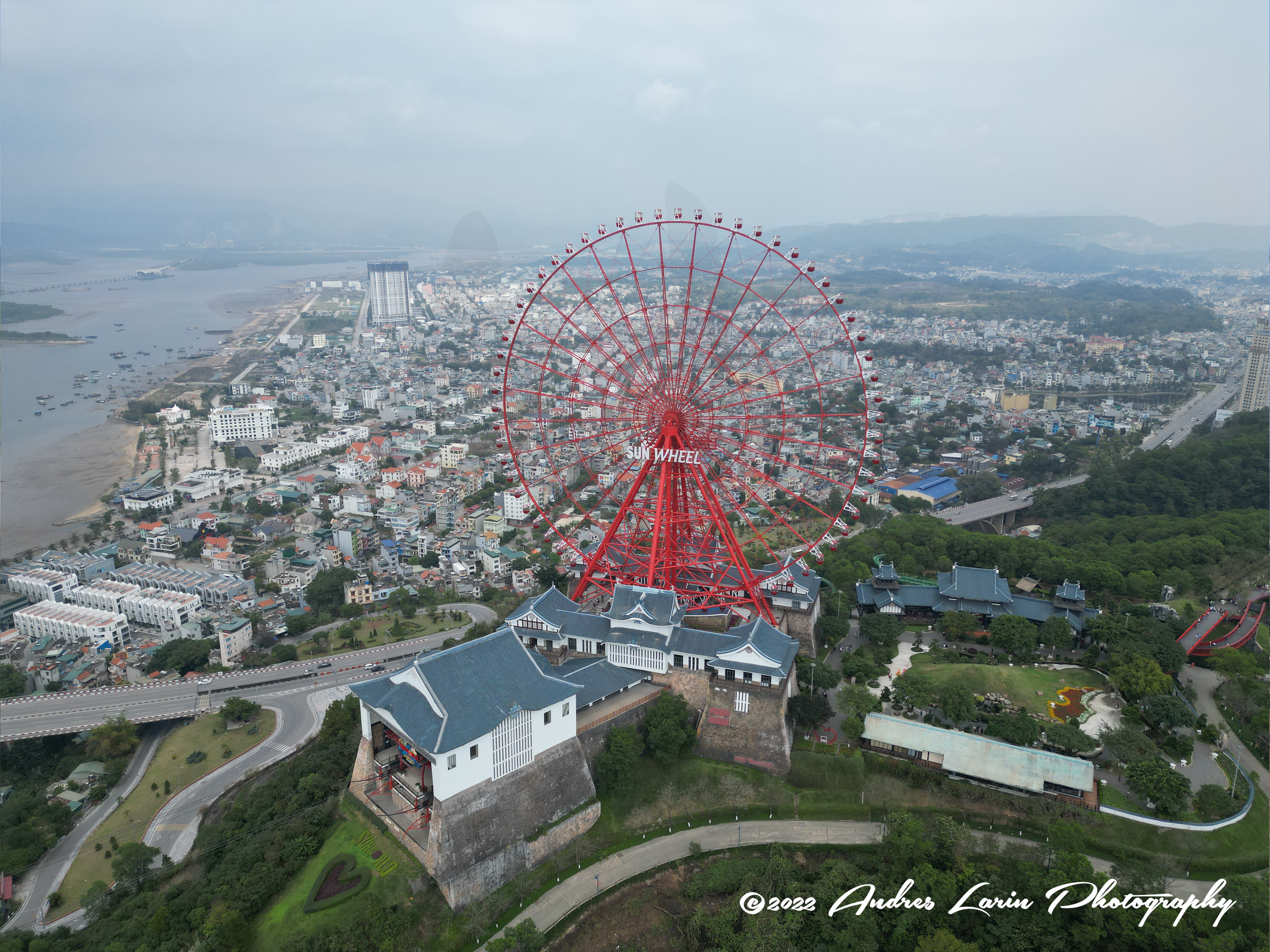
Sun Wheel
