= Bãi Cháy Bridge =

Bai Chay Bridge Cầu Bãi Cháy
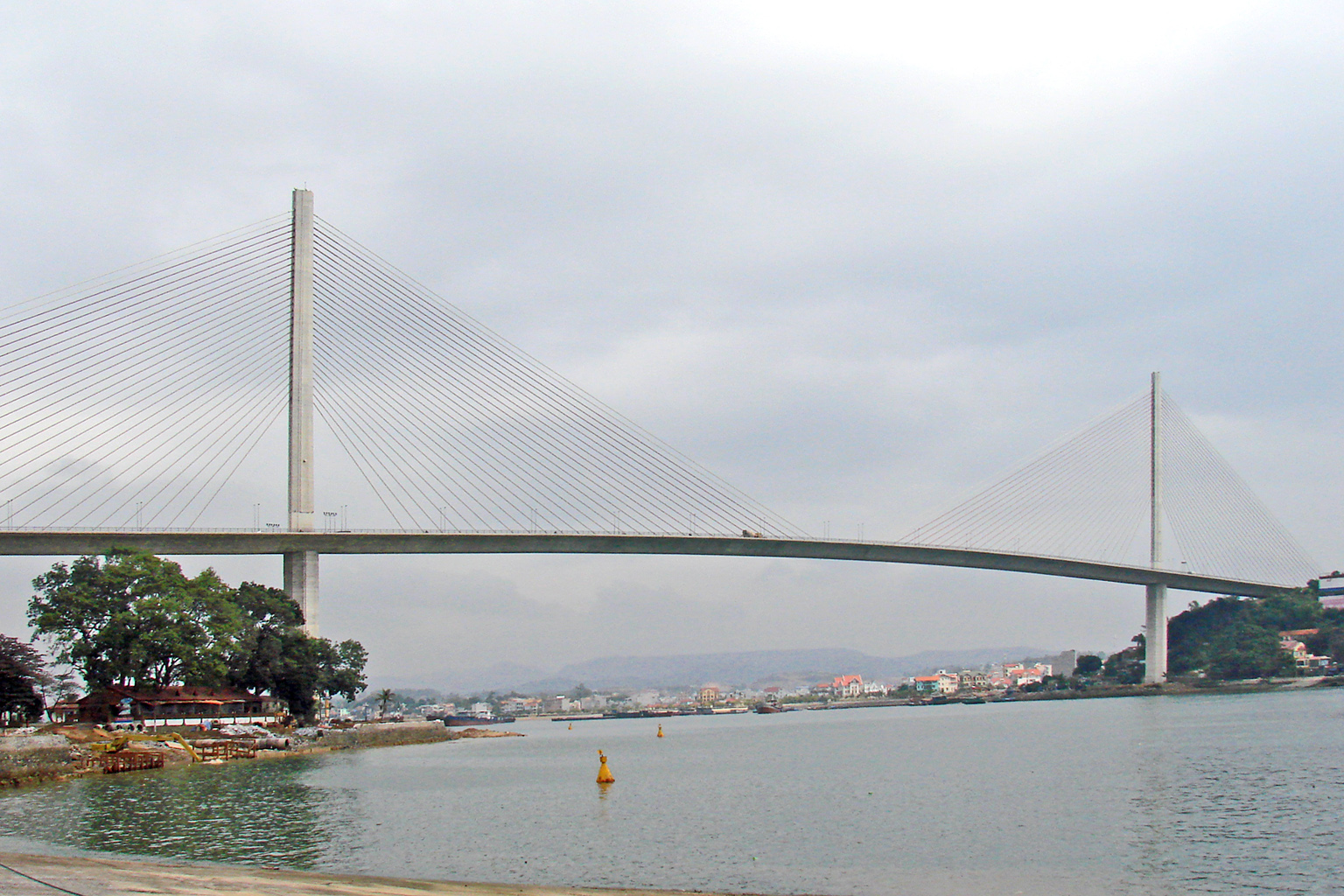
- Bai Chay Bridge's main span
- Coordinates: 20°57′37″N 107°03′57″E
- Carries: 4 lanes (cable-stayed section) and 6 lanes (other sections), 2 lanes each way and 2 pedestrian lanes
- Crosses: Hạ Long Bay
- Locale: Quảng Ninh Province, (Vietnam)
- Maintained by: Ministry of Transport of Vietnam

Characteristics
- Design: Cable-stayed bridge
- Total length: 1,106 meters (3,629 ft)
- Width: 25 meters (82 ft)
- Height: 150 meters (490 ft)
- Longest span: 435 meters (1,427 ft)
- Clearance below: 50 meters (160 ft)

History
- Constructed by: Shimizu; Sumitomo Mitsui Construction
- Construction start: May 18, 2003
- Opened: December 2, 2006

Location
- Interactive map of Bai Chay Bridge

The Bãi Cháy Bridge (Vietnamese: Cầu Bãi Cháy) is a cable-stayed bridge on Highway 18, connecting Hồng Gai with Bãi Cháy over the Cửa Lục straits, separating Cửa Lục Bay with Hạ Long Bay, on the territory of Hạ Long city, Quảng Ninh province, Vietnam. It is the first, and at the time of its inauguration, the longest central-line cable-stayed bridge in Vietnam.

== Design ==
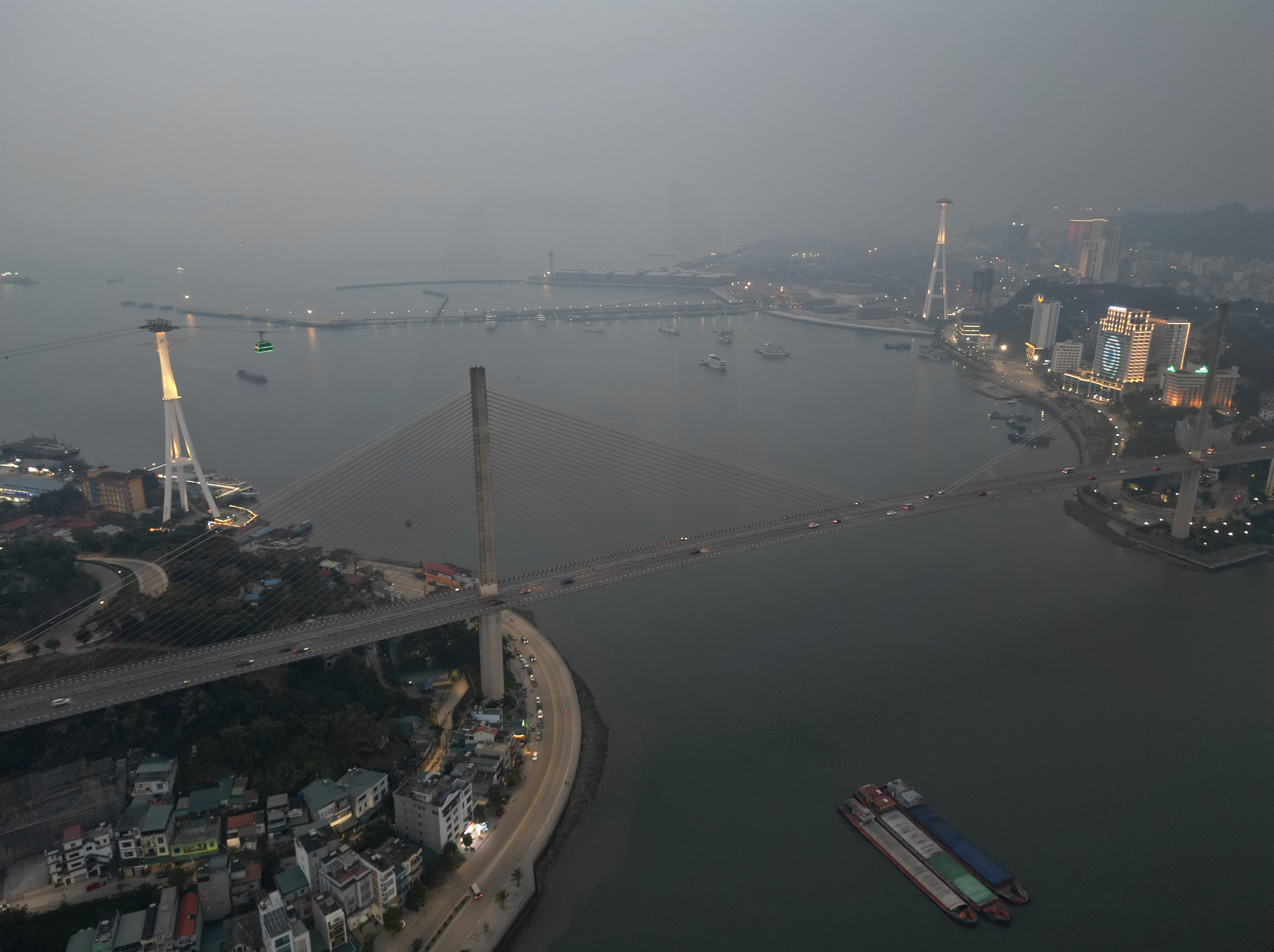
Drone shot of Bãi Cháy bridge in 2023

The bridge has two outer span of reinforced pre-stressed concrete box beams, which are the widest of the world for this type of bridge. The towers are located on a huge pneumatic caisson foundation system, a modern construction technology first applied in Vietnam on this project. The bridge was constructed using a balanced cantilever technology, wherein the bridge beams reaching out over the water and the aligned ends connect at a head height of 50 metres (160 ft) above the water level. This technique assured that vessels could still operate normally during the construction process.

The bridge was completed and opened for traffic on December 2, 2006. The bridge was built to address the needs of the local people and tourists, and also to complete the discontinuation of the Bãi Cháy ferry line.

== Technical details ==
- Spans: 5 spans, main span of 435 meters (1,427 ft)
- Navigable width: 150 meters (490 ft)
- Load: Class A standard Japanese
- Cost: about VND 1046 billions, 40-month construction period, to November 30, 2006 termination
- Owner: Ministry of Transport, representing the owner: Project Management Unit 18-PMU18
- Design consultant - monitor: Institute of bridges and structures in Japan
- Contractor: Shimizu-Sumitomo Mitsui Construction

== Gallery ==
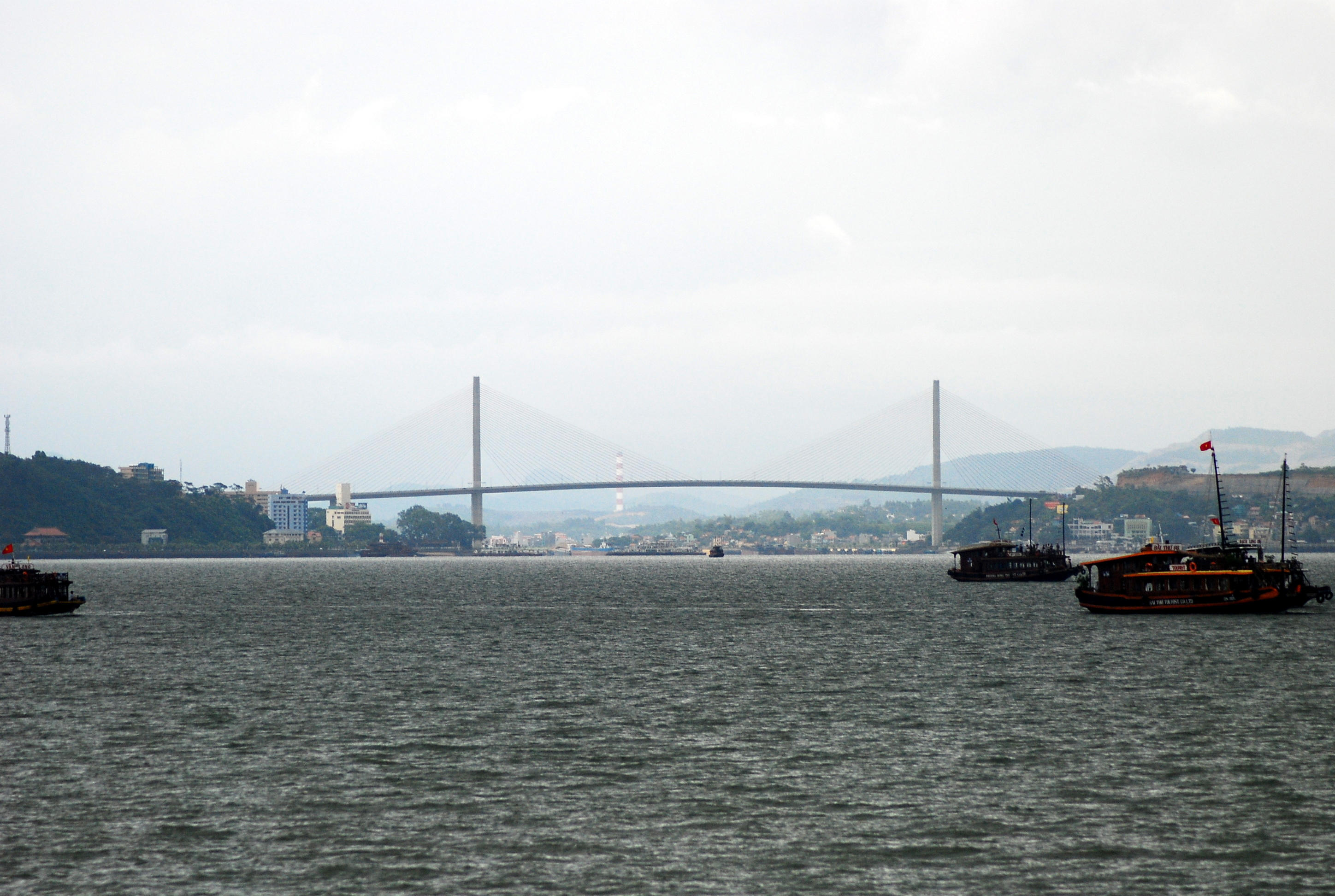
Bãi Cháy Bridge view from afar

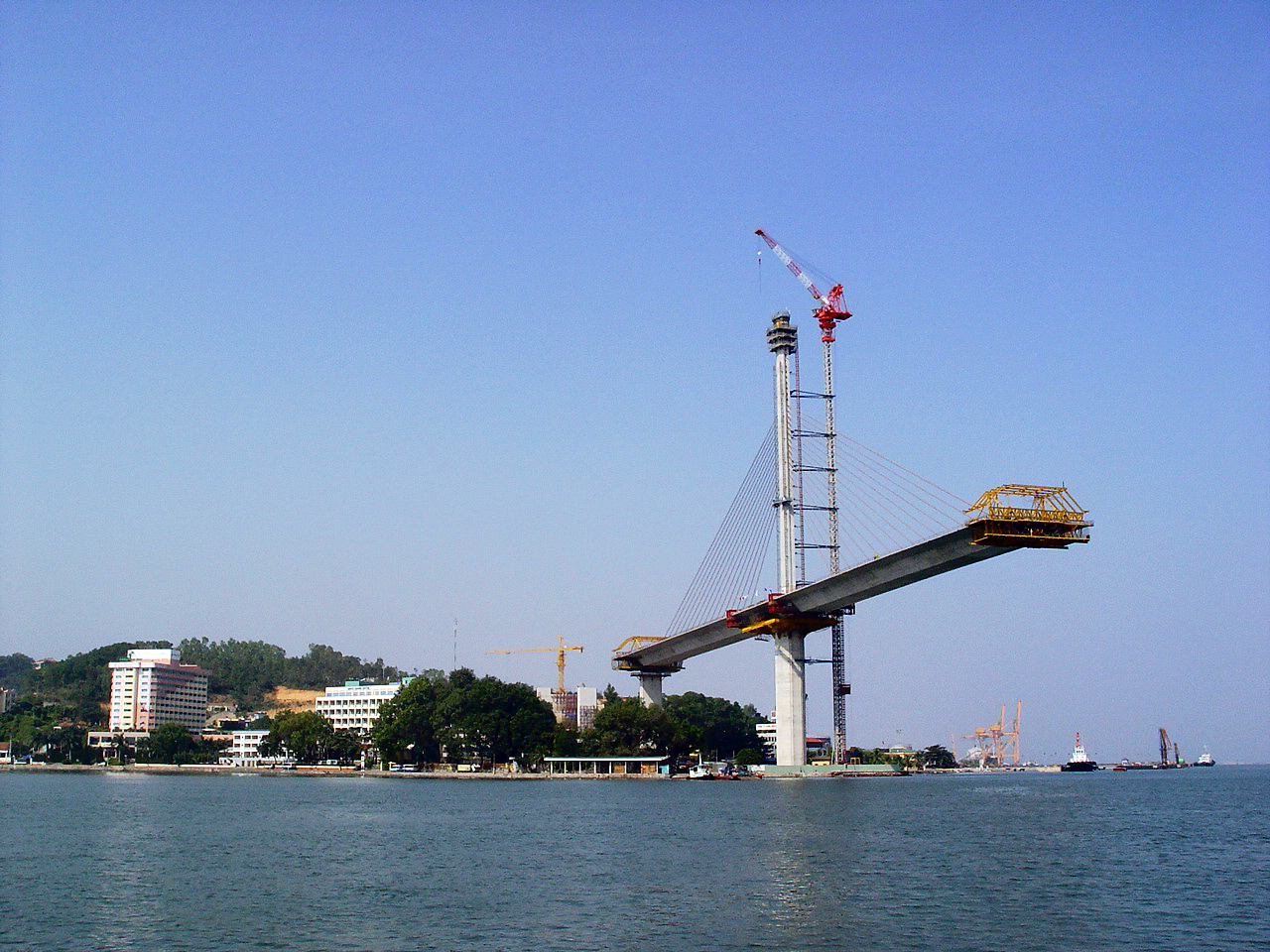
The bridge during construction

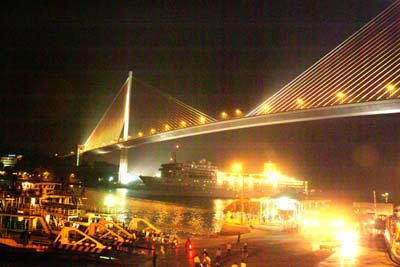
Bãi Cháy Bridge at night

== See also ==
- List of longest cable-stayed bridge spans
- Transport in Vietnam
- List of bridges
