= Bãi Cháy =

Coordinates: 20°57′57″N 107°02′05″E

- Ward
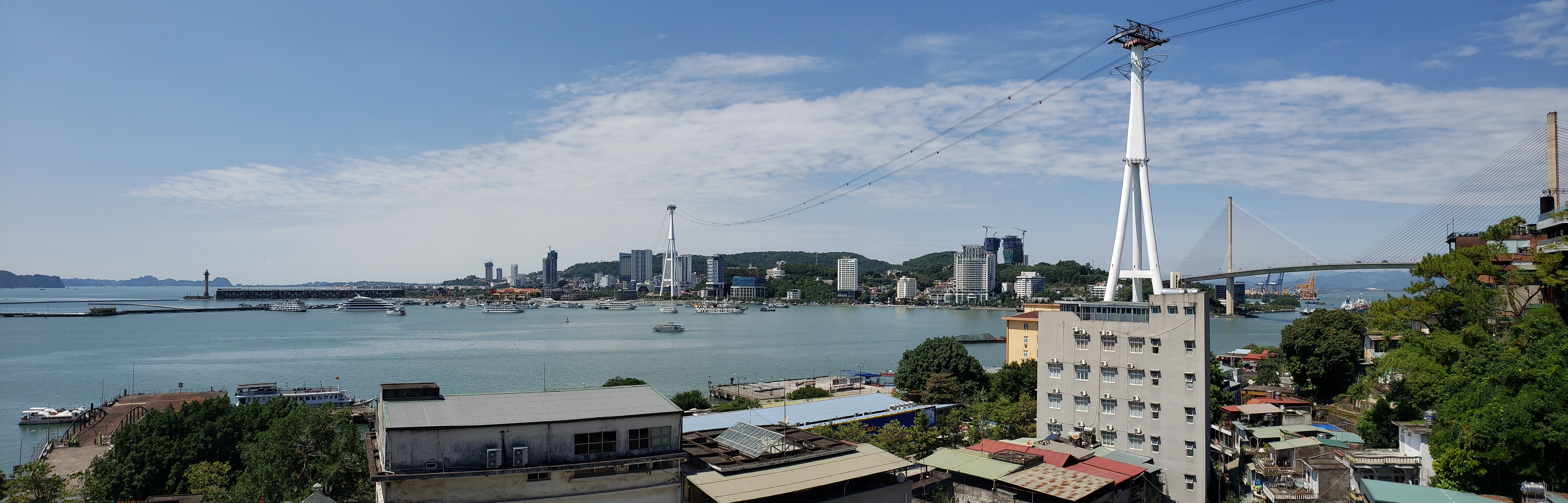
- Panoramic view of Bãi Cháy, seen from Hòn Gai, in 2023
- Interactive map of Bãi Cháy
- Country: Vietnam
- City: Quảng Ninh
- Founded: 1981

Area
  - Total: 8.12 sq mi (21.02 km^{2})

Population (2019)
  - Total: 30,280
  - Density: 3,700/sq mi (1,440/km^{2})
- Time zone: UTC+07:00 (Indochina Time)

Bãi Cháy is a ward in Quảng Ninh, Vietnam. It, along with the eastern part known colloquially as Hòn Gai, together make up the former provincial city of Hạ Long. Known as the city's "tourism zone", many hotels, beach resorts and other tourism hotspots are located within Bãi Cháy. The ward was linked to Hòn Gai via a ferry line until the inauguration of the Bãi Cháy Bridge in 2006.

== Etymology ==
According to local legend, Bãi Cháy is the place where the Trần dynasty's forces, led by Trần Khánh Dư, burned the Mongols' vessels. A northeast wind then blew the fire toward the west side of the Cửa Lục Bay and inflamed the dry forest nearby. This story gives rise to the name "Bãi Cháy" (lit. 'burning beach').

Another local folk story tells that boats used to anchor at the west side of Cửa Lục. Fishermen gathered and burned Casuarinaceae's leaves around those vessels in order to deal with shipworm that bored into them. As people from Hồng Gai and elsewhere saw fire blazing up from this place regularly, they coined the term "Bãi Cháy" for the area. Under French rule, Bãi Cháy was named Vatchay or Ile aux buissons (lit. 'bush island').

== Geography ==
Bãi Cháy has an artificial sandy beach located along the shores with a length of more than 500 metres (550 yd) and a width of 500 metres (550 yd). The ward's general topographic feature is a low elevation range of hills sloping gently toward the sea.

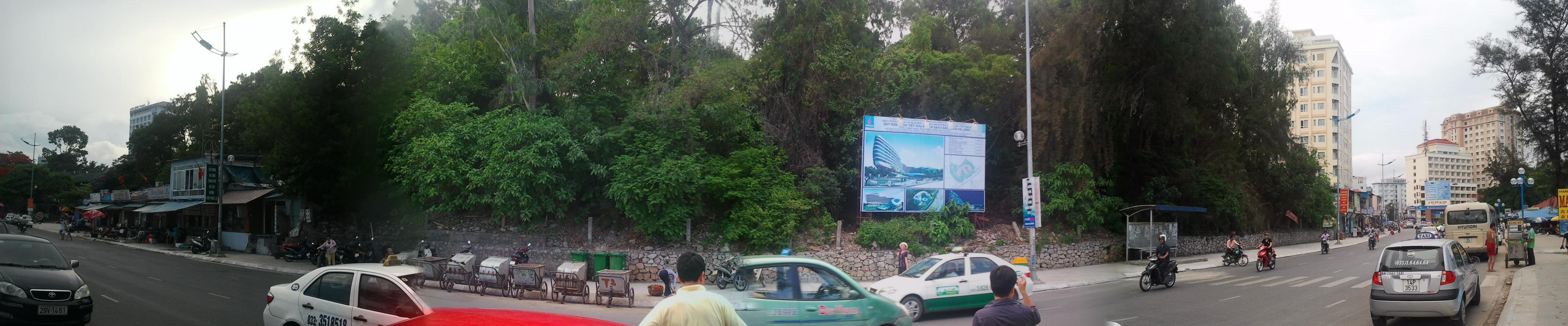
A road in a tourist area

== Gallery ==
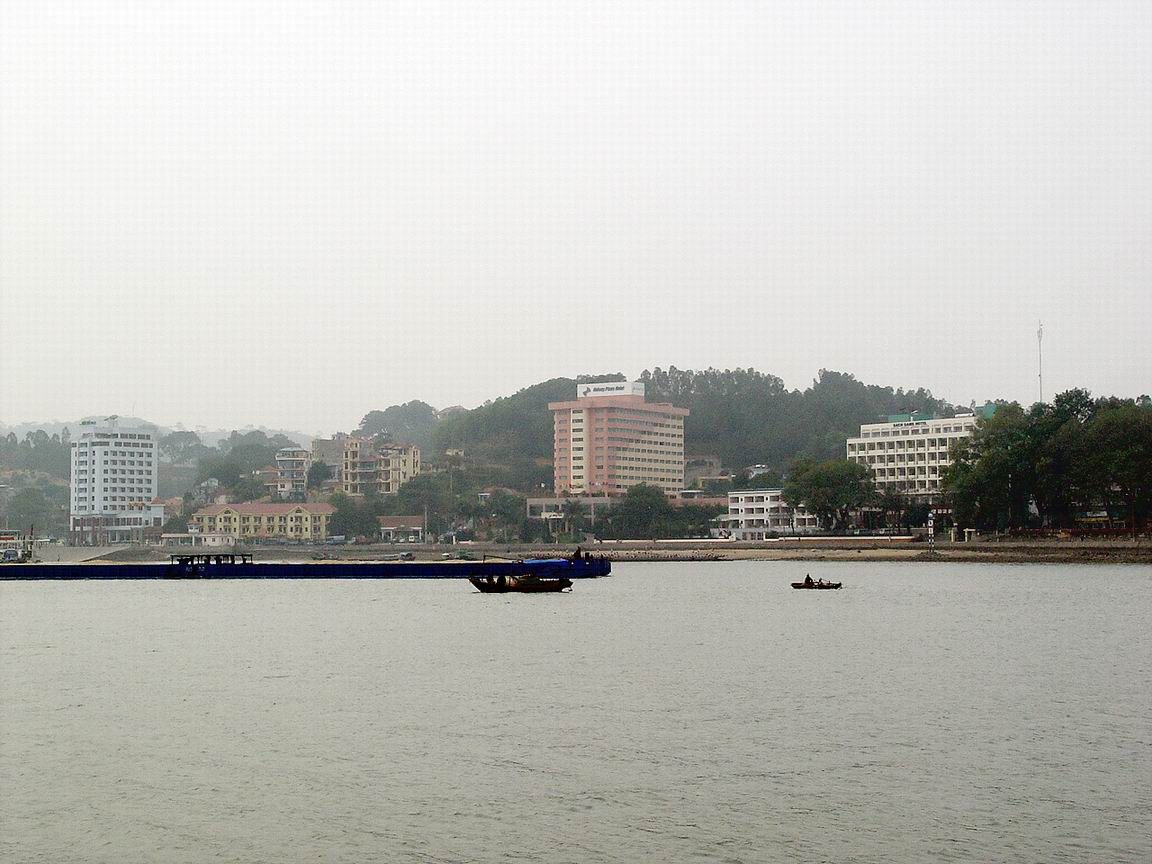
High-end hotels

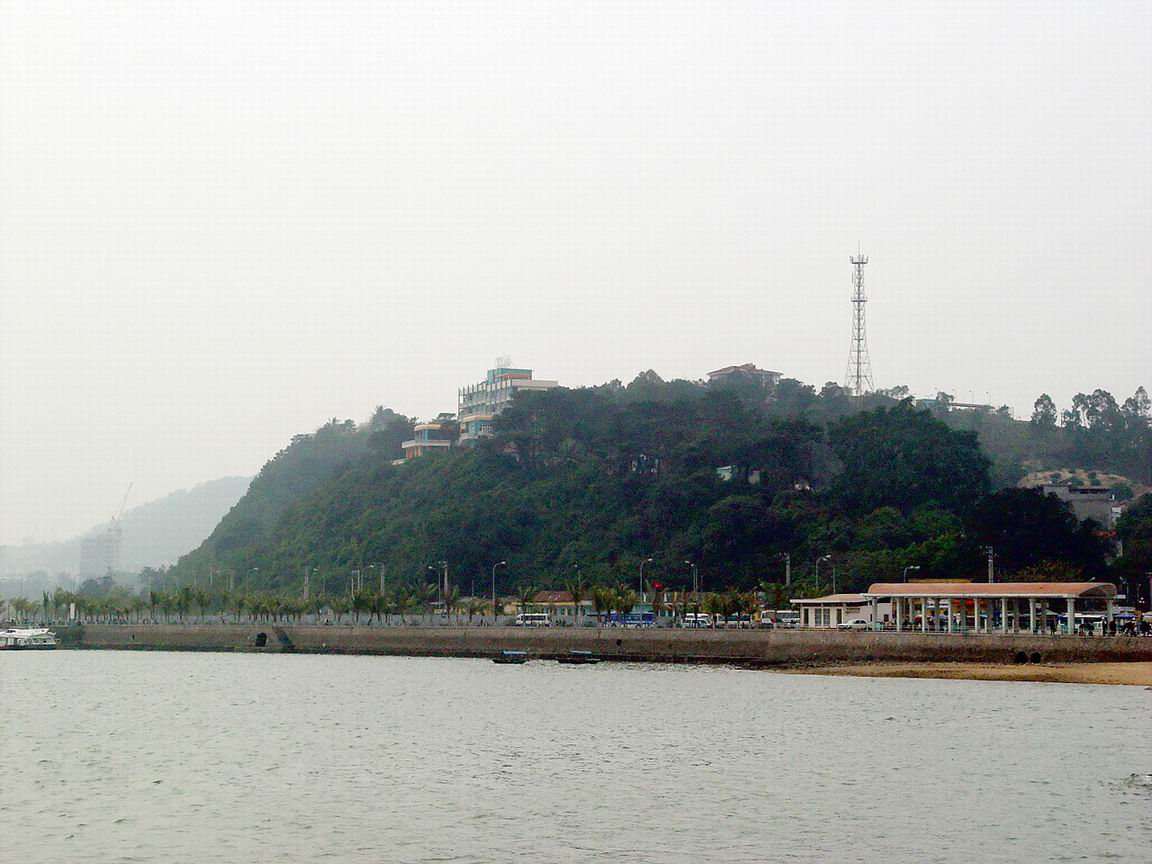
The old ferry terminal, on the hill is the Hải Quân Hotel and the villa of General Võ Nguyên Giáp
