= Hạ Long =

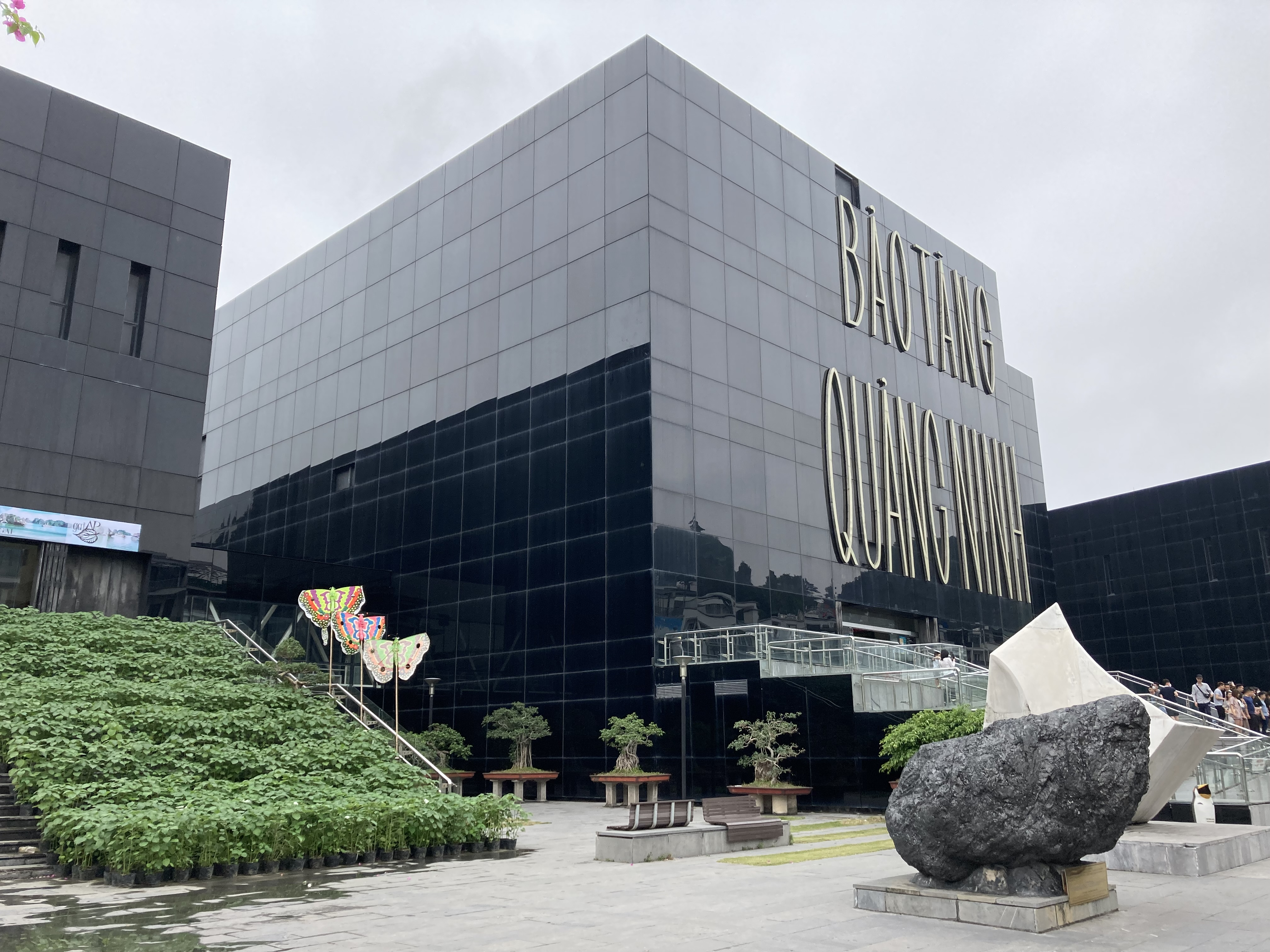
- Quảng Ninh Museum
- Interactive map of Hạ Long
- Coordinates: 20.949119194868047°N 107.10450387688952°E
- Country: Vietnam
- Region: Red River Delta
- City: Quảng Ninh
- Established: 16 June 2025
- Administrative headquarters: Quarter 6, Residential Group 6A

Area
  - Total: 6.08 km^{2} (2.35 sq mi)

Population (2025)
  - Total: 52,905
  - Density: 8,701/km^{2} (22,540/sq mi)

Hạ Long is a ward serving as the administrative center of Quảng Ninh, Vietnam. The ward inherited its name from the former city of Hạ Long, which was formerly the provincial capital of Quảng Ninh Province.

== History ==
The territory of present-day Hạ Long ward formerly belonged to the two central wards of Hồng Hải and Hồng Hà in the former city of Hạ Long, Quảng Ninh province.

On 16 June 2025:

- The National Assembly promulgated Resolution No. 203/2025/QH15 amending and supplementing a number of articles of the Constitution of the Socialist Republic of Vietnam. The resolution took effect on 16 June 2025. Under the resolution, district-level administrative units throughout Vietnam ceased to operate from 1 July 2025.
- The Standing Committee of the National Assembly promulgated Resolution No. 1679/NQ-UBTVQH15 on the arrangement of commune-level administrative units in Quảng Ninh Province in 2025, which took effect on 16 June 2025. Under the resolution, the entire area and population of Hồng Hà and Hồng Hải wards were merged to form a new ward named Hạ Long.

On 24 August 2026, the National Assembly promulgated Resolution No. 36/2026/QH16 establishing the city of Quảng Ninh on the basis of the entire area and population of Quảng Ninh povince. The resolution took effect on 1 September 2026. Hạ Long ward consequently became part of the city of Quảng Ninh and became the city's administrative center.
